= List of NCAA Division I basketball arenas =

This is a list of arenas that currently serve as the home venue for NCAA Division I college basketball teams. Conference affiliations reflect those in the 2026–27 season; all affiliation changes officially took effect on July 1, 2026. The arenas serve as home venues for both the men's and women's teams, except where noted. Venues which are not located on campus or are used infrequently during the season have been listed.

== Current arenas ==
Off-campus arena

| Image | Arena | City | State | Team | Conference | Capacity | Opened |
|---|---|---|---|---|---|---|---|
| | Conte Forum | Chestnut Hill (Note: The mailing address is Chestnut Hill, but the arena is in the city limits of Newton.) | MA | Boston College | ACC | 8,606 | 1988 |
| | Haas Pavilion | Berkeley | CA | California | ACC | 11,858 | 1933 |
| | Littlejohn Coliseum | Clemson | SC | Clemson | ACC | 9,000 | 1968 |
| | Cameron Indoor Stadium | Durham | NC | Duke | ACC | 9,314 | 1940 |
| | Donald L. Tucker Civic Center | Tallahassee | FL | Florida State | ACC | 12,100 | 1981 |
| | Hank McCamish Pavilion | Atlanta | GA | Georgia Tech | ACC | 8,600 | 1956 |
| | KFC Yum! Center | Louisville | KY | Louisville | ACC | 22,090 | 2010 |
| | Watsco Center | Coral Gables | FL | Miami (FL) | ACC | 7,972 | 2003 |
| | Dean Smith Center | Chapel Hill | NC | North Carolina men | ACC | 21,750 | 1986 |
| | Carmichael Arena | Chapel Hill | NC | North Carolina women | ACC | 8,010 | 1965 |
| | Lenovo Center | Raleigh | NC | NC State men | ACC | 19,500 | 1999 |
| | Reynolds Coliseum | Raleigh | NC | NC State women | ACC | 5,500 | 1949 |
| | Purcell Pavilion at Edmund P. Joyce Center | Notre Dame | IN | Notre Dame | ACC | 9,149 | 1968 |
| | Petersen Events Center | Pittsburgh | PA | Pittsburgh | ACC | 12,508 | 2002 |
| | Moody Coliseum | University Park (Note: The campus has a Dallas mailing address.) | TX | SMU | ACC | 7,000 | 1956 |
| | Maples Pavilion | Stanford | CA | Stanford | ACC | 7,233 | 1969 |
| | JMA Wireless Dome | Syracuse | NY | Syracuse | ACC | 35,446 | 1980 |
| | John Paul Jones Arena | Charlottesville | VA | Virginia | ACC | 14,593 | 2006 |
| | Cassell Coliseum | Blacksburg | VA | Virginia Tech | ACC | 10,052 | 1962 |
| | Lawrence Joel Veterans Memorial Coliseum | Winston-Salem | NC | Wake Forest | ACC | 14,407 | 1989 |
| | Broadview Center | Guilderland | NY | Albany | America East | 4,538 | 1992 |
| | Binghamton University Events Center | Vestal (Note: The campus has a Binghamton mailing address.) | NY | Binghamton | America East | 5,142 | 2004 |
| | Cross Insurance Center | Bangor | ME | Maine | America East | 5,800 | 2013 |
| | Lundholm Gym | Durham | NH | New Hampshire | America East | 3,000 | 1938 |
| | Chace Athletic Center | Smithfield | RI | Bryant | America East | 2,700 | 2001 |
| | Wellness and Events Center | Newark | NJ | NJIT | America East | 3,500 | 2017 |
| | Costello Athletic Center | Lowell | MA | UMass Lowell | America East | 2,100 | 1964 |
| | Tsongas Center | Lowell | MA | UMass Lowell | America East | 6,496 | 1998 |
| | Chesapeake Employers Insurance Arena | Catonsville (Note: The campus has a Baltimore mailing address.) | MD | UMBC | America East | 5,000 | 2018 |
| | Patrick Gym | Burlington | VT | Vermont | America East | 3,228 | 1963 |
| | Dale F. Halton Arena | Charlotte | NC | Charlotte | American | 9,105 | 1996 |
| | Williams Arena at Minges Coliseum | Greenville | NC | East Carolina | American | 8,000 | 1968 |
| | FAU Arena | Boca Raton | FL | Florida Atlantic | American | 3,161 | 1984 |
| | FedExForum | Memphis | TN | Memphis | American | 18,119 | 2004 |
| | Elma Roane Fieldhouse | Memphis | TN | Memphis women | American | 2,565 | 1951 |
| | UNT Coliseum | Denton | TX | North Texas | American | 9,797 | 1973 |
| | Tudor Fieldhouse | Houston | TX | Rice | American | 5,208 | 1950 |
| | Yuengling Center | Tampa | FL | South Florida | American | 10,411 | 1980 |
| | Liacouras Center (Note: Temple splits its women's home games between the Liacouras Center and another on-campus facility, McGonigle Hall.) | Philadelphia | PA | Temple | American | 10,206 | 1997 |
| | Devlin Fieldhouse | New Orleans | LA | Tulane | American | 4,100 | 1933 |
| | Reynolds Center | Tulsa | OK | Tulsa | American | 8,355 | 1998 |
| | Bartow Arena | Birmingham | AL | UAB | American | 8,508 | 1988 |
| | Convocation Center | San Antonio | TX | UTSA | American | 4,080 | 1975 |
| | Charles Koch Arena (Note: Wichita State plays one men's game each season off-campus at Intrust Bank Arena.) | Wichita | KS | Wichita State | American | 10,506 | 1955 |
| | Knights Hall | Louisville | KY | Bellarmine | ASUN | 2,196 | 1960 |
| | Alico Arena | Fort Myers (Note: The campus has a Fort Myers mailing address, but is physically located in unincorporated Lee County.) | FL | Florida Gulf Coast | ASUN | 4,633 | 2002 |
| | Swisher Gymnasium | Jacksonville | FL | Jacksonville | ASUN | 1,360 | 1953 |
| | Allen Arena | Nashville | TN | Lipscomb | ASUN | 5,028 | 2001 |
| | UNF Arena | Jacksonville | FL | North Florida | ASUN | 5,800 | 1993 |
| | Curry Arena | Charlotte | NC | Queens | ASUN | 2,500 | 2012 |
| | Edmunds Center | DeLand | FL | Stetson | ASUN | 5,000 | 1974 |
| | UWF Field House | Pensacola | FL | West Florida | ASUN | 1,750 | 1971 |
| | John M. Belk Arena | Davidson | NC | Davidson | Atlantic 10 | 5,223 | 1989 |
| | University of Dayton Arena | Dayton | OH | Dayton | Atlantic 10 | 13,409 | 1969 |
| | UPMC Cooper Fieldhouse | Pittsburgh | PA | Duquesne | Atlantic 10 | 3,500 | 1988 |
| | Rose Hill Gymnasium | Bronx | NY | Fordham | Atlantic 10 | 3,200 | 1925 |
| | EagleBank Arena | Fairfax (Note: The campus has a Fairfax mailing address, but is physically located in unincorporated Fairfax County, which encloses but does not include the city of Fairfax.) | VA | George Mason | Atlantic 10 | 10,000 | 1985 |
| | Charles E. Smith Center | Washington | DC | George Washington | Atlantic 10 | 5,000 | 1975 |
| | John Glaser Arena | Philadelphia | PA | La Salle | Atlantic 10 | 3,000 | 2024 |
| | Joseph J. Gentile Arena | Chicago | IL | Loyola Chicago | Atlantic 10 | 4,486 | 1996 |
| | Ryan Center | Kingston | RI | Rhode Island | Atlantic 10 | 7,657 | 2002 |
| | Robins Center | Richmond | VA | Richmond | Atlantic 10 | 7,201 | 1972 |
| | Reilly Center | St. Bonaventure | NY | St. Bonaventure | Atlantic 10 | 5,480 | 1966 |
| | Hagan Arena | Philadelphia | PA | Saint Joseph's | Atlantic 10 | 3,800 | 1949 |
| | Chaifetz Arena | St. Louis | MO | Saint Louis | Atlantic 10 | 10,600 | 2008 |
| | Siegel Center | Richmond | VA | Virginia Commonwealth | Atlantic 10 | 7,637 | 1999 |
| | McKale Center | Tucson | AZ | Arizona | Big 12 | 14,688 | 1973 |
| | Desert Financial Arena | Tempe | AZ | Arizona State | Big 12 | 14,198 | 1974 |
| | Foster Pavilion | Waco | TX | Baylor | Big 12 | 7,500 | 2024 |
| | Marriott Center | Provo | UT | BYU | Big 12 | 19,000 | 1971 |
| | Fifth Third Arena | Cincinnati | OH | Cincinnati | Big 12 | 12,012 | 1989 |
| | CU Events Center | Boulder | CO | Colorado | Big 12 | 11,064 | 1979 |
| | Fertitta Center | Houston | TX | Houston | Big 12 | 7,100 | 1969 |
| | Hilton Coliseum | Ames | IA | Iowa State | Big 12 | 14,267 | 1971 |
| | Allen Fieldhouse | Lawrence | KS | Kansas | Big 12 | 15,300 | 1955 |
| | Bramlage Coliseum | Manhattan | KS | Kansas State | Big 12 | 11,000 | 1988 |
| | Gallagher-Iba Arena | Stillwater | OK | Oklahoma State | Big 12 | 13,611 | 1938 |
| | Schollmaier Arena | Fort Worth | TX | TCU | Big 12 | 8,500 | 1961 |
| | United Supermarkets Arena | Lubbock | TX | Texas Tech | Big 12 | 15,300 | 1999 |
| | Addition Financial Arena | Orlando (Note: The campus has an Orlando mailing address, but is physically located in unincorporated Orange County.) | FL | UCF | Big 12 | 9,432 | 2007 |
| | Jon M. Huntsman Center | Salt Lake City | UT | Utah | Big 12 | 15,000 | 1969 |
| | WVU Coliseum | Morgantown | WV | West Virginia | Big 12 | 14,000 | 1970 |
| | Hinkle Fieldhouse | Indianapolis | IN | Butler | Big East | 9,100 | 1928 |
| | CHI Health Center Omaha | Omaha | NE | Creighton men | Big East | 18,320 | 2003 |
| | D. J. Sokol Arena | Omaha | NE | Creighton women | Big East | 2,950 | 2009 |
| | Wintrust Arena (Note: DePaul splits its women's home games between Wintrust Arena and the on-campus McGrath–Phillips Arena.) | Chicago | IL | DePaul | Big East | 10,387 | 2017 |
| | Capital One Arena | Washington | DC | Georgetown men | Big East | 20,308 | 1997 |
| | McDonough Gymnasium | Washington | DC | Georgetown women | Big East | 2,500 | 1951 |
| | Fiserv Forum | Milwaukee | WI | Marquette men | Big East | 17,385 | 2018 |
| | Al McGuire Center | Milwaukee | WI | Marquette women | Big East | 4,000 | 2004 |
| | Amica Mutual Pavilion | Providence | RI | Providence men | Big East | 12,400 | 1972 |
| | Alumni Hall | Providence | RI | Providence women | Big East | 2,620 | 1955 |
| | Prudential Center | Newark | NJ | Seton Hall men | Big East | 18,711 | 2007 |
| | Walsh Gymnasium | South Orange | NJ | Seton Hall women | Big East | 1,316 | 1941 |
| | Madison Square Garden (Note: St. John's men generally play their Big East home schedule in Madison Square Garden and their non-conference home schedule on campus at Carnesecca Arena.) | New York | NY | St. John's men | Big East | 19,812 | 1968 |
| | Carnesecca Arena | Queens | NY | St. John's women | Big East | 6,107 | 1961 |
| | Harry A. Gampel Pavilion (Note: UConn splits its men's and women's home games between the Gampel Pavilion and the PeoplesBank Arena in Hartford, Connecticut.) | Storrs | CT | UConn | Big East | 10,167 | 1990 |
| | Finneran Pavilion (Note: For certain high-profile home games, Villanova uses Xfinity Mobile Arena in Philadelphia.) | Villanova | PA | Villanova | Big East | 6,500 | 1986 |
| | Cintas Center | Cincinnati | OH | Xavier | Big East | 10,250 | 2000 |
| | Reese Court | Cheney | WA | Eastern Washington | Big Sky | 6,000 | 1981 |
| | Idaho Central Credit Union Arena | Moscow | ID | Idaho | Big Sky | 4,200 | 2021 |
| | ICCU Dome | Pocatello | ID | Idaho State men | Big Sky | 8,000 | 1970 |
| | Reed Gym | Pocatello | ID | Idaho State women | Big Sky | 3,214 | 1951 |
| | Dahlberg Arena | Missoula | MT | Montana | Big Sky | 7,321 | 1953 |
| | Brick Breeden Fieldhouse | Bozeman | MT | Montana State | Big Sky | 7,250 | 1957 |
| | Walkup Skydome | Flagstaff | AZ | Northern Arizona | Big Sky | 11,230 | 1977 |
| | Bank of Colorado Arena | Greeley | CO | Northern Colorado | Big Sky | 2,992 | 1975 |
| | Viking Pavilion | Portland | OR | Portland State | Big Sky | 3,094 | 1966 |
| | America First Event Center | Cedar City | UT | Southern Utah | Big Sky | 5,300 | 1985 |
| | Burns Arena | St. George | UT | Utah Tech | Big Sky | 4,779 | 1986 |
| | Dee Events Center | Ogden | UT | Weber State | Big Sky | 11,592 | 1977 |
| | Buccaneer Field House | North Charleston | SC | Charleston Southern | Big South | 881 | 1965 |
| | Paul Porter Arena | Boiling Springs | NC | Gardner–Webb | Big South | 3,500 | 1982 |
| | Nido & Mariana Qubein Arena and Conference Center | High Point | NC | High Point | Big South | 4,500 | 2021 |
| | Joan Perry Brock Center | Farmville | VA | Longwood | Big South | 3,000 | 2023 |
| | Templeton Physical Education Center | Clinton | SC | Presbyterian | Big South | 2,300 | 1975 |
| | Dedmon Center | Radford | VA | Radford | Big South | 3,205 | 1981 |
| | Kimmel Arena | Asheville | NC | UNC Asheville | Big South | 3,200 | 2011 |
| | G. B. Hodge Center | Spartanburg | SC | USC Upstate | Big South | 878 | 1973 |
| | Winthrop Coliseum | Rock Hill | SC | Winthrop | Big South | 6,100 | 1982 |
| | State Farm Center | Champaign | IL | Illinois | Big Ten | 15,544 | 1963 |
| | Simon Skjodt Assembly Hall | Bloomington | IN | Indiana | Big Ten | 17,472 | 1971 |
| | Carver–Hawkeye Arena | Iowa City | IA | Iowa | Big Ten | 15,500 | 1983 |
| | Xfinity Center | College Park | MD | Maryland | Big Ten | 17,300 | 2002 |
| | Crisler Center | Ann Arbor | MI | Michigan | Big Ten | 12,707 | 1967 |
| | Breslin Student Events Center | East Lansing | MI | Michigan State | Big Ten | 14,797 | 1989 |
| | Williams Arena | Minneapolis | MN | Minnesota | Big Ten | 14,625 | 1928 |
| | Pinnacle Bank Arena | Lincoln | NE | Nebraska | Big Ten | 15,147 | 2013 |
| | Welsh–Ryan Arena | Evanston | IL | Northwestern | Big Ten | 7,039 | 1952 |
| | Value City Arena | Columbus | OH | Ohio State | Big Ten | 18,809 | 1998 |
| | Matthew Knight Arena | Eugene | OR | Oregon | Big Ten | 12,369 | 2011 |
| | Bryce Jordan Center | University Park (Note: The entire Penn State campus has a University Park mailing address. The arena is physically located in College Township.) | PA | Penn State | Big Ten | 15,261 | 1996 |
| | Mackey Arena | West Lafayette | IN | Purdue | Big Ten | 14,848 | 1967 |
| | Jersey Mike's Arena | Piscataway | NJ | Rutgers | Big Ten | 8,000 | 1977 |
| | Pauley Pavilion | Los Angeles | CA | UCLA | Big Ten | 13,800 | 1965 |
| | Galen Center | Los Angeles | CA | USC | Big Ten | 10,258 | 2006 |
| | Alaska Airlines Arena at Hec Edmundson Pavilion | Seattle | WA | Washington | Big Ten | 10,000 | 1927 |
| | Kohl Center | Madison | WI | Wisconsin | Big Ten | 17,249 | 1998 |
| | Robert A. Mott Athletics Center | San Luis Obispo | CA | Cal Poly | Big West | 3,032 | 1960 |
| | Icardo Center | Bakersfield | CA | Cal State Bakersfield | Big West | 3,497 | 1989 |
| | Titan Gym | Fullerton | CA | Cal State Fullerton | Big West | 4,000 | 1964 |
| | Premier America Credit Union Arena | Northridge (Note: Northridge is one of many Los Angeles neighborhoods that have separate postal identities from the city.) | CA | Cal State Northridge | Big West | 2,500 | 1962 |
| | Fowler Events Center | Riverside | CA | California Baptist | Big West | 5,050 | 2017 |
| | LBS Financial Credit Union Pyramid | Long Beach | CA | Long Beach State | Big West | 4,000 | 1994 |
| | Hornets Nest | Sacramento | CA | Sacramento State | Big West | 1,012 | 1955 |
| | Bren Events Center | Irvine | CA | UC Irvine | Big West | 4,984 | 1987 |
| | UC Riverside Student Recreation Center | Riverside | CA | UC Riverside | Big West | 3,168 | 1994 |
| | LionTree Arena | La Jolla (Note: La Jolla is a San Diego neighborhood with its own postal identity.) | CA | UC San Diego | Big West (WCC in 2027) | 4,200 | 1995 |
| | UC Santa Barbara Events Center | Santa Barbara (Note: The campus has a Santa Barbara mailing address, but is physically located in the unincorporated community of Isla Vista.) | CA | UC Santa Barbara | Big West | 5,600 | 1979 |
| | UCCU Center | Orem | UT | Utah Valley | Big West | 7,500 | 1996 |
| | John W. Pope, Jr. Convocation Center | Buies Creek | NC | Campbell | CAA | 3,095 | 2008 |
| | TD Arena | Charleston | SC | Charleston | CAA | 5,100 | 2008 |
| | Daskalakis Athletic Center | Philadelphia | PA | Drexel | CAA | 2,509 | 1974 |
| | Schar Center | Elon | NC | Elon | CAA | 5,100 | 2018 |
| | Hampton Convocation Center | Hampton | VA | Hampton | CAA | 7,200 | 1993 |
| | Mack Sports Complex | Hempstead | NY | Hofstra | CAA | 5,124 | 2000 |
| | OceanFirst Bank Center | West Long Branch | NJ | Monmouth | CAA | 4,100 | 2009 |
| | Corbett Sports Center | Greensboro | NC | North Carolina A&T | CAA | 5,700 | 1978 |
| | Cabot Center | Boston | MA | Northeastern (Note: Cabot Center, already home to Northeastern women's basketball, now also houses the Northeastern men during the construction of the university's new arena.) | CAA | 1,800 | 1954 |
| | Island Federal Credit Union Arena | Stony Brook | NY | Stony Brook | CAA | 4,160 | 1967 |
| | TU Arena | Towson | MD | Towson | CAA | 5,200 | 2013 |
| | Trask Coliseum | Wilmington | NC | UNC Wilmington | CAA | 5,200 | 1977 |
| | Kaplan Arena | Williamsburg | VA | William & Mary | CAA | 11,300 | 1971 |
| | Bob Carpenter Center | Newark | DE | Delaware | CUSA | 5,000 | 1992 |
| | Ocean Bank Convocation Center | Miami (Note: The campus has a Miami mailing address, but is physically located in unincorporated Miami-Dade County.) | FL | FIU | CUSA | 5,000 | 1986 |
| | Pete Mathews Coliseum | Jacksonville | AL | Jacksonville State | CUSA | 3,500 | 1974 |
| | KSU Convocation Center | Kennesaw (Note: The campus has a Kennesaw mailing address, but is physically located in unincorporated Cobb County.) | GA | Kennesaw State | CUSA | 4,600 | 2003 |
| | Liberty Arena | Lynchburg | VA | Liberty | CUSA | 4,000 | 2020 |
| | Thomas Assembly Center | Ruston | LA | Louisiana Tech | Sun Belt | 8,000 | 1982 |
| | Murphy Center | Murfreesboro | TN | Middle Tennessee | CUSA | 11,520 | 1972 |
| | Great Southern Bank Arena | Springfield | MO | Missouri State | CUSA | 11,000 | 2008 |
| | Pan American Center | Las Cruces | NM | New Mexico State | CUSA | 12,482 | 1968 |
| | Bernard Johnson Coliseum | Huntsville | TX | Sam Houston | CUSA | 6,100 | 1976 |
| | E. A. Diddle Arena | Bowling Green | KY | Western Kentucky | CUSA | 7,326 | 1963 |
| | Wolstein Center | Cleveland | OH | Cleveland State | Horizon | 13,610 | 1991 |
| | Calihan Hall | Detroit | MI | Detroit Mercy | Horizon | 7,917 | 1952 |
| | Resch Center | Ashwaubenon | WI | Green Bay men | Horizon | 9,729 | 2002 |
| | Kress Events Center | Green Bay | WI | Green Bay women | Horizon | 4,018 | 2007 |
| | James T. Morris Arena | Indianapolis | IN | IU Indy | Horizon | 4,500 | 2026 |
| | UW–Milwaukee Panther Arena | Milwaukee | WI | Milwaukee men | Horizon | 10,783 | 1950 |
| | Klotsche Center | Milwaukee | WI | Milwaukee women | Horizon | 3,500 | 1977 |
| | Convocation Center | DeKalb | IL | Northern Illinois | Horizon | 10,000 | 2002 |
| | Truist Arena | Highland Heights | KY | Northern Kentucky | Horizon | 9,400 | 2008 |
| | OU Credit Union O'rena | Rochester (Note: The campus has a Rochester mailing address, but is physically divided between the separate cities of Auburn Hills and Rochester Hills. The arena is in Auburn Hills.) | MI | Oakland | Horizon | 4,000 | 1998 |
| | Hilliard Gates Sports Center | Fort Wayne | IN | Purdue Fort Wayne | Horizon | 2,300 | 1981 |
| | UPMC Events Center | Moon Township | PA | Robert Morris | Horizon | 4,000 | 2019 |
| | Nutter Center | Fairborn (Note: The campus has a Dayton mailing address.) | OH | Wright State | Horizon | 9,500 | 1990 |
| | Beeghly Center | Youngstown | OH | Youngstown State | Horizon | 6,300 | 1972 |
| | Pizzitola Sports Center | Providence | RI | Brown | Ivy | 2,800 | 1989 |
| | Levien Gymnasium | New York (Note: "New York" is the mailing address for Manhattan, not the entirety of New York City.) | NY | Columbia | Ivy | 2,500 | 1974 |
| | Newman Arena | Ithaca | NY | Cornell | Ivy | 4,473 | 1990 |
| | Leede Arena | Hanover | NH | Dartmouth | Ivy | 2,100 | 1986 |
| | Lavietes Pavilion | Allston (Note: Allston is a Boston neighborhood with its own postal identity.) | MA | Harvard | Ivy | 2,195 | 1982 |
| | Palestra | Philadelphia | PA | Penn | Ivy | 8,722 | 1927 |
| | Jadwin Gymnasium | Princeton | NJ | Princeton | Ivy | 6,854 | 1969 |
| | John J. Lee Amphitheater | New Haven | CT | Yale | Ivy | 2,532 | 1932 |
| | Koessler Athletic Center | Buffalo | NY | Canisius | MAAC | 2,196 | 1968 |
| | Leo D. Mahoney Arena | Fairfield | CT | Fairfield | MAAC | 3,500 | 2022 |
| | Hynes Athletic Center | New Rochelle | NY | Iona | MAAC | 2,578 | 1974 |
| | Draddy Gymnasium | Bronx | NY | Manhattan | MAAC | 2,345 | 1978 |
| | McCann Arena | Poughkeepsie | NY | Marist | MAAC | 3,200 | 1977 |
| | Hammel Court | North Andover | MA | Merrimack | MAAC | 1,200 | 1972 |
| | Knott Arena | Emmitsburg (Note: The campus has an Emmitsburg mailing address, but is physically located in unincorporated Frederick County.) | MD | Mount St. Mary's | MAAC | 3,500 | 1987 |
| | Gallagher Center | Lewiston (Note: The campus mailing address is Niagara University.) | NY | Niagara | MAAC | 2,400 | 1949 |
| | M&T Bank Arena | Hamden | CT | Quinnipiac | MAAC | 3,570 | 2007 |
| | Alumni Gymnasium | Lawrenceville | NJ | Rider | MAAC | 1,650 | 1958 |
| | William H. Pitt Center | Fairfield | CT | Sacred Heart | MAAC | 2,062 | 1997 |
| | MVP Arena | Albany | NY | Siena men | MAAC | 15,229 | 1990 |
| | UHY Center | Loudonville | NY | Siena women | MAAC | 4,000 | 1974 |
| | Run Baby Run Arena | Jersey City | NJ | Saint Peter's | MAAC | 3,200 | 1975 |
| | James A. Rhodes Arena | Akron | OH | Akron | MAC | 5,500 | 1983 |
| | Worthen Arena | Muncie | IN | Ball State | MAC | 11,500 | 1991 |
| | Stroh Center | Bowling Green | OH | Bowling Green | MAC | 4,700 | 2011 |
| | Alumni Arena | Amherst (Note: The campus has a Buffalo mailing address.) | NY | Buffalo | MAC | 6,783 | 1982 |
| | McGuirk Arena | Mount Pleasant | MI | Central Michigan | MAC | 5,300 | 1973 |
| | George Gervin GameAbove Center | Ypsilanti | MI | Eastern Michigan | MAC | 8,824 | 1998 |
| | Memorial Athletic and Convocation Center | Kent | OH | Kent State | MAC | 6,327 | 1950 |
| | Mullins Center | Amherst | MA | Massachusetts | MAC | 9,493 | 1993 |
| | Millett Hall | Oxford | OH | Miami (Ohio) | MAC | 10,640 | 1968 |
| | Convocation Center | Athens | OH | Ohio | MAC | 13,080 | 1968 |
| | Savage Arena | Toledo | OH | Toledo | MAC | 7,300 | 1976 |
| | University Arena | Kalamazoo | MI | Western Michigan | MAC | 5,421 | 1957 |
| | Physical Education Complex | Baltimore | MD | Coppin State | MEAC | 4,100 | 2009 |
| | Memorial Hall | Dover | DE | Delaware State | MEAC | 1,800 | 1982 |
| | Burr Gymnasium | Washington | DC | Howard | MEAC | 2,700 | 1963 |
| | Hytche Athletic Center | Princess Anne (Note: The campus has a Princess Anne mailing address, but is physically located in unincorporated Somerset County.) | MD | Maryland Eastern Shore | MEAC | 5,500 | 1999 |
| | Talmadge L. Hill Field House | Baltimore | MD | Morgan State | MEAC | 4,250 | 1975 |
| | Joseph G. Echols Memorial Hall | Norfolk | VA | Norfolk State | MEAC | 4,500 | 1982 |
| | McDougald–McLendon Arena | Durham | NC | North Carolina Central | MEAC | 3,500 | 1955 |
| | SHM Memorial Center | Orangeburg | SC | South Carolina State | MEAC | 3,200 | 1968 |
| | Curb Event Center | Nashville | TN | Belmont | Missouri Valley | 5,085 | 2003 |
| | Carver Arena | Peoria | IL | Bradley men | Missouri Valley | 11,433 | 1982 |
| | Renaissance Coliseum | Peoria | IL | Bradley women | Missouri Valley | 4,200 | 2010 |
| | Knapp Center | Des Moines | IA | Drake | Missouri Valley | 6,424 | 1992 |
| | Ford Center | Evansville | IN | Evansville men | Missouri Valley | 10,000 | 2011 |
| | Meeks Family Fieldhouse at Carson Center | Evansville | IN | Evansville women | Missouri Valley | 1,087 | 1962 |
| | CEFCU Arena | Normal | IL | Illinois State | Missouri Valley | 10,200 | 1989 |
| | Hulman Center | Terre Haute | IN | Indiana State | Missouri Valley | 10,200 | 1973 |
| | CFSB Center | Murray | KY | Murray State | Missouri Valley | 8,602 | 1998 |
| | McLeod Center | Cedar Falls | IA | Northern Iowa | Missouri Valley | 7,018 | 2006 |
| | Banterra Center | Carbondale | IL | Southern Illinois | Missouri Valley | 8,284 | 1964 |
| | Credit Union 1 Arena | Chicago | IL | UIC | Missouri Valley | 6,958 | 1982 |
| | Athletics–Recreation Center | Valparaiso | IN | Valparaiso | Missouri Valley | 5,000 | 1984 |
| | Clune Arena | USAF Academy (Note: The Academy grounds lie almost entirely outside the city of Colorado Springs. The US Census Bureau and US Postal Service respectively consider the Academy to be "Air Force Academy" and "USAF Academy".) | CO | Air Force | Mountain West | 5,508 | 1968 |
| | Global Credit Union Arena | Phoenix | AZ | Grand Canyon | Mountain West | 7,000 | 2011 |
| | Stan Sheriff Center | Honolulu | HI | Hawaii | Mountain West | 10,300 | 1994 |
| | Lawlor Events Center | Reno | NV | Nevada | Mountain West | 11,536 | 1983 |
| | The Pit | Albuquerque | NM | New Mexico | Mountain West | 15,411 | 1966 |
| | Provident Credit Union Event Center | San Jose | CA | San Jose State | Mountain West | 5,000 | 1989 |
| | Thomas & Mack Center | Paradise (Note: The campus mailing address is Las Vegas.) | NV | UNLV men | Mountain West | 18,776 | 1983 |
| | Cox Pavilion | Paradise | NV | UNLV women | Mountain West | 2,500 | 2001 |
| | University Credit Union Center | Davis | CA | UC Davis | Mountain West | 7,600 | 1977 |
| | Don Haskins Center | El Paso | TX | UTEP | Mountain West | 12,222 | 1976 |
| | Arena-Auditorium | Laramie | WY | Wyoming | Mountain West | 11,612 | 1982 |
| | William H. Detrick Gymnasium | New Britain | CT | Central Connecticut | NEC | 2,654 | 1965 |
| | Emil and Patricia Jones Convocation Center | Chicago | IL | Chicago State | NEC | 7,000 | 2007 |
| | Bogota Savings Bank Center | Hackensack | NJ | Fairleigh Dickinson | NEC | 1,862 | 1987 |
| | Le Moyne Events Center | DeWitt (Note: The campus mailing address is Syracuse.) | NY | Le Moyne | NEC | 2,000 | 1962 |
| | Steinberg Wellness Center | Brooklyn | NY | LIU | NEC | 2,500 | 2006 |
| | Mercyhurst Athletic Center | Erie | PA | Mercyhurst | NEC | 1,100 | 1977 |
| | Jeffery P. Hazell Athletics Center | West Haven | CT | New Haven | NEC | 900 | 2022 |
| | Merkert Gymnasium | Easton | MA | Stonehill | NEC | 1,560 | 1973 |
| | Spiro Sports Center | Staten Island | NY | Wagner | NEC | 2,100 | 1999 |
| | Lantz Arena | Charleston | IL | Eastern Illinois | Ohio Valley | 5,400 | 1967 |
| | Robert F. Hyland Performance Arena | St. Charles | MO | Lindenwood | Ohio Valley | 3,270 | 1997 |
| | Ellis Johnson Arena | Morehead | KY | Morehead State | Ohio Valley | 6,500 | 1981 |
| | Show Me Center | Cape Girardeau | MO | Southeast Missouri State | Ohio Valley | 7,373 | 1987 |
| | Vadalabene Center | Edwardsville | IL | SIU Edwardsville | Ohio Valley | 4,000 | 1984 |
| | Liberty Arena, Home of the Screaming Eagles | Evansville (Note: The campus has an Evansville mailing address, but is physically located in unincorporated Vanderburgh County.) | IN | Southern Indiana | Ohio Valley | 4,800 | 2019 |
| | Kathleen and Tom Elam Center | Martin | TN | Tennessee-Martin | Ohio Valley | 4,300 | 1969 |
| | Gentry Complex | Nashville | TN | Tennessee State | Ohio Valley | 9,100 | 1980 |
| | Western Hall | Macomb | IL | Western Illinois | Ohio Valley | 5,139 | 1964 |
| | ExtraMile Arena | Boise | ID | Boise State | Pac-12 | 12,644 | 1982 |
| | Moby Arena | Fort Collins | CO | Colorado State | Pac-12 | 8,083 | 1966 |
| | Save Mart Center at Fresno State | Fresno | CA | Fresno State | Pac-12 | 15,596 | 2003 |
| | McCarthey Athletic Center | Spokane | WA | Gonzaga | Pac-12 | 6,000 | 2004 |
| | Gill Coliseum | Corvallis | OR | Oregon State | Pac-12 | 9,301 | 1949 |
| | Viejas Arena | San Diego | CA | San Diego State | Pac-12 | 12,414 | 1997 |
| | Strahan Arena | San Marcos | TX | Texas State | Pac-12 | 10,000 | 1982 |
| | Smith Spectrum | Logan | UT | Utah State | Pac-12 | 10,270 | 1968 |
| | Beasley Coliseum | Pullman | WA | Washington State | Pac-12 | 12,058 | 1973 |
| | Bender Arena | Washington | DC | American | Patriot | 4,500 | 1988 |
| | Christl Arena | West Point | NY | Army | Patriot | 5,043 | 1985 |
| | Case Gym | Boston | MA | Boston University | Patriot | 1,800 | 1972 |
| | Sojka Pavilion | Lewisburg | PA | Bucknell | Patriot | 4,000 | 2003 |
| | Cotterell Court | Hamilton | NY | Colgate | Patriot | 1,750 | 1959 |
| | Hart Center at the Luth Athletics Complex | Worcester | MA | Holy Cross | Patriot | 3,536 | 1975 |
| | Kirby Sports Center | Easton | PA | Lafayette | Patriot | 2,453 | 1973 |
| | Stabler Arena | Bethlehem | PA | Lehigh | Patriot | 5,600 | 1979 |
| | Reitz Arena | Baltimore | MD | Loyola (Maryland) | Patriot | 2,100 | 1984 |
| | Alumni Hall | Annapolis | MD | Navy | Patriot | 5,710 | 1991 |
| | Coleman Coliseum | Tuscaloosa | AL | Alabama | SEC | 15,383 | 1968 |
| | Bud Walton Arena | Fayetteville | AR | Arkansas | SEC | 19,368 | 1993 |
| | Neville Arena | Auburn | AL | Auburn | SEC | 9,121 | 2010 |
| | Exactech Arena at the Stephen C. O'Connell Center | Gainesville | FL | Florida | SEC | 10,500 | 1980 |
| | Stegeman Coliseum | Athens | GA | Georgia | SEC | 10,523 | 1964 |
| | Rupp Arena | Lexington | KY | Kentucky men (Note: The Kentucky women's team plays one or two games each season at Rupp Arena.) | SEC | 20,545 | 1976 |
| | Memorial Coliseum | Lexington | KY | Kentucky women | SEC | 6,250 | 1950 |
| | Pete Maravich Assembly Center | Baton Rouge | LA | LSU | SEC | 13,215 | 1972 |
| | Lloyd Noble Center | Norman | OK | Oklahoma | SEC | 11,528 | 1973 |
| | The Sandy and John Black Pavilion at Ole Miss | University | MS | Ole Miss | SEC | 9,500 | 2016 |
| | Humphrey Coliseum | Mississippi State | MS | Mississippi State | SEC | 10,575 | 1975 |
| | Mizzou Arena | Columbia | MO | Missouri | SEC | 15,061 | 2004 |
| | Colonial Life Arena | Columbia | SC | South Carolina | SEC | 18,000 | 2002 |
| | Thompson–Boling Arena | Knoxville | TN | Tennessee | SEC | 21,678 | 1987 |
| | Moody Center | Austin | TX | Texas | SEC | 10,763 | 2022 |
| | Reed Arena | College Station | TX | Texas A&M | SEC | 12,989 | 1998 |
| | Memorial Gymnasium | Nashville | TN | Vanderbilt | SEC | 14,316 | 1952 |
| | McKenzie Arena | Chattanooga | TN | Chattanooga | Southern | 10,995 | 1982 |
| | McAlister Field House | Charleston | SC | The Citadel | Southern | 6,000 | 1939 |
| | Freedom Hall Civic Center | Johnson City | TN | East Tennessee State | Southern | 6,149 | 1974 |
| | Timmons Arena | Greenville | SC | Furman | Southern | 4,000 | 1998 |
| | Hawkins Arena | Macon | GA | Mercer | Southern | 3,500 | 2004 |
| | Pete Hanna Center | Homewood | AL | Samford | Southern | 4,974 | 2007 |
| | Hooper Eblen Center | Cookeville | TN | Tennessee Tech | Southern | 9,280 | 1977 |
| | First Horizon Coliseum | Greensboro | NC | UNC Greensboro | Southern | 7,613 | 1959 |
| | Cameron Hall | Lexington | VA | VMI | Southern | 5,029 | 1981 |
| | Liston B. Ramsey Regional Activity Center | Cullowhee | NC | Western Carolina | Southern | 7,826 | 1986 |
| | Jerry Richardson Indoor Stadium | Spartanburg | SC | Wofford | Southern | 3,400 | 2017 |
| | The Field House | Commerce | TX | East Texas A&M | Southland | 3,055 | 1950 |
| | Sharp Gymnasium | Houston | TX | Houston Christian | Southland | 1,000 | 1963 |
| | McDermott Center | San Antonio | TX | Incarnate Word | Southland | 2,000 | 1989 |
| | Neches Federal Credit Union Arena at the Montagne Center | Beaumont | TX | Lamar | Southland | 10,080 | 1984 |
| | Townsley Law Arena | Lake Charles | LA | McNeese | Southland | 4,242 | 2018 |
| | Lakefront Arena | New Orleans | LA | New Orleans | Southland | 8,933 | 1983 |
| | Stopher Gymnasium | Thibodaux | LA | Nicholls | Southland | 3,800 | 1967 |
| | Prather Coliseum | Natchitoches | LA | Northwestern State | Southland | 3,900 | 1964 |
| | University Center | Hammond | LA | Southeastern Louisiana | Southland | 7,500 | 1982 |
| | William R. Johnson Coliseum | Nacogdoches | TX | Stephen F. Austin | Southland | 7,203 | 1974 |
| | American Bank Center Arena (Note: Texas A&M–Corpus Christi uses the on-campus Dugan Wellness Center as an alternate home court for both men's and women's teams.) | Corpus Christi | TX | Texas A&M-Corpus Christi | Southland | 8,000 | 2004 |
| | UTRGV Fieldhouse | Edinburg | TX | UTRGV | Southland | 2,500 | 1969 |
| | Swinney Recreation Center | Kansas City | MO | Kansas City | Summit | 1,500 | 1941 |
| | Betty Engelstad Sioux Center | Grand Forks | ND | North Dakota | Summit | 3,300 | 2004 |
| | Scheels Center | Fargo | ND | North Dakota State | Summit | 5,460 | 2016 |
| | Baxter Arena | Omaha | NE | Omaha | Summit | 7,898 | 2015 |
| | Mabee Center | Tulsa | OK | Oral Roberts | Summit | 10,154 | 1972 |
| | Lee and Penny Anderson Arena | Saint Paul | MN | St. Thomas | Summit | 5,000 | 2025 |
| | Sanford Coyote Sports Center | Vermillion | SD | South Dakota | Summit | 6,000 | 2016 |
| | First Bank and Trust Arena | Brookings | SD | South Dakota State | Summit | 6,500 | 1973 |
| | George M. Holmes Convocation Center | Boone | NC | Appalachian State | Sun Belt | 8,325 | 2000 |
| | First National Bank Arena | Jonesboro | AR | Arkansas State | Sun Belt | 10,038 | 1987 |
| | HTC Center | Conway | SC | Coastal Carolina | Sun Belt | 3,212 | 2012 |
| | Jack and Ruth Ann Hill Convocation Center | Statesboro | GA | Georgia Southern | Sun Belt | 5,500 | 2024 |
| | Georgia State Convocation Center | Atlanta | GA | Georgia State | Sun Belt | 7,500 | 2022 |
| | Atlantic Union Bank Center | Harrisonburg | VA | James Madison | Sun Belt | 8,500 | 2020 |
| | Cajundome | Lafayette | LA | Louisiana | Sun Belt | 13,500 | 1985 |
| | Fant–Ewing Coliseum | Monroe | LA | Louisiana–Monroe | Sun Belt | 7,085 | 1971 |
| | Cam Henderson Center | Huntington | WV | Marshall | Sun Belt | 9,048 | 1981 |
| | Chartway Arena | Norfolk | VA | Old Dominion | Sun Belt | 8,472 | 2002 |
| | Mitchell Center | Mobile | AL | South Alabama | Sun Belt | 10,041 | 1998 |
| | Reed Green Coliseum | Hattiesburg | MS | Southern Miss | Sun Belt | 8,095 | 1965 |
| | Trojan Arena | Troy | AL | Troy | Sun Belt | 5,200 | 2012 |
| | Alabama A&M Events Center | Normal (Note: The campus mailing address is Huntsville.) | AL | Alabama A&M | SWAC | 6,000 | 2022 |
| | Dunn–Oliver Acadome | Montgomery | AL | Alabama State | SWAC | 7,400 | 1992 |
| | Davey Whitney Complex | Lorman (Note: The campus has a Lorman mailing address, but is physically located in unincorporated Claiborne County.) | MS | Alcorn State | SWAC | 7,000 | 1975 |
| | K. L. Johnson Complex | Pine Bluff | AR | Arkansas-Pine Bluff | SWAC | 4,500 | 1982 |
| | Moore Gymnasium | Daytona Beach | FL | Bethune-Cookman | SWAC | 3,000 | 1953 |
| | Al Lawson Center | Tallahassee | FL | Florida A&M | SWAC | 9,639 | 2009 |
| | Fredrick C. Hobdy Assembly Center | Grambling | LA | Grambling | SWAC | 7,500 | 2007 |
| | Williams Assembly Center | Jackson | MS | Jackson State | SWAC | 8,000 | 1981 |
| | Harrison HPER Complex | Itta Bena (Note: The campus has an Itta Bena mailing address, but is physically located in unincorporated Leflore County.) | MS | Mississippi Valley State | SWAC | 5,000 | 1970 |
| | William J. Nicks Building | Prairie View | TX | Prairie View A&M | SWAC | 4,000 | 1968 |
| | F. G. Clark Activity Center | Baton Rouge | LA | Southern | SWAC | 7,500 | 1975 |
| | Health and Physical Education Arena | Houston | TX | Texas Southern | SWAC | 8,100 | 1989 |
| | Moody Coliseum | Abilene | TX | Abilene Christian | UAC | 3,600 | 1968 |
| | F&M Bank Arena | Clarksville | TN | Austin Peay | UAC | 5,500 | 2023 |
| | Farris Center | Conway | AR | Central Arkansas | UAC | 6,000 | 1972 |
| | Baptist Health Arena | Richmond | KY | Eastern Kentucky | UAC | 6,500 | 1963 |
| | Jack Stephens Center | Little Rock | AR | Little Rock | UAC | 5,600 | 2005 |
| | Flowers Hall | Florence | AL | North Alabama | UAC | 4,000 | 1972 |
| | EECU Center | Stephenville | TX | Tarleton State | UAC | 8,000 | 2025 |
| | College Park Center | Arlington | TX | UT Arlington | UAC | 7,000 | 2012 |
| | The Coliseum | Carrollton | GA | West Georgia | UAC | 5,953 | 2009 |
| | Hamilton Gymnasium | Denver | CO | Denver | West Coast | 2,500 | 1961 |
| | Gersten Pavilion | Los Angeles | CA | Loyola Marymount | West Coast | 3,900 | 1981 |
| | Alex G. Spanos Center | Stockton | CA | Pacific | West Coast | 6,150 | 1981 |
| | Firestone Fieldhouse | Malibu (Note: The campus has a Malibu mailing address, but is physically located in unincorporated Los Angeles County.) | CA | Pepperdine | West Coast | 3,104 | 1973 |
| | Chiles Center | Portland | OR | Portland | West Coast | 4,852 | 1984 |
| | University Credit Union Pavilion | Moraga | CA | Saint Mary's | West Coast | 3,500 | 1978 |
| | Jenny Craig Pavilion | San Diego | CA | San Diego | West Coast | 5,100 | 2000 |
| | The Sobrato Center | San Francisco | CA | San Francisco | West Coast | 3,005 | 1958 |
| | Leavey Center | Santa Clara | CA | Santa Clara | West Coast | 4,500 | 1975 |
| | Redhawk Center | Seattle | WA | Seattle | West Coast | 999 | 1959 |

== Additional arenas ==
Off-campus arena

| Image | Arena | City | State | Team | Conference | Capacity | Opened |
|---|---|---|---|---|---|---|---|
| | Intrust Bank Arena | Wichita | KS | Wichita State men, Kansas State men | The American, Big 12 | 15,004 | 2010 |
| | T-Mobile Center | Kansas City | MO | Kansas men, Kansas State men | Big 12 | 18,972 | 2007 |
| | McGrath-Phillips Arena | Chicago | IL | DePaul women | Big East | 3,000 | 2000 |
| | Xfinity Mobile Arena | Philadelphia | PA | Villanova men | Big East | 20,318 | 1996 |
| | PeoplesBank Arena | Hartford | CT | UConn | Big East | 16,294 | 1975 |
| | North Charleston Coliseum | North Charleston | SC | Charleston Southern | Big South | 11,475 | 1993 |
| | Vines Center | Lynchburg | VA | Liberty | CUSA | 9,547 | 1990 |
| | Fleming Gymnasium | Greensboro | NC | UNC Greensboro women | Southern | 2,320 | 1989 |
| | Dugan Wellness Center | Corpus Christi | TX | Texas A&M–Corpus Christi | Southland | 1,200 | 2008 |
| | Climate Pledge Arena | Seattle | WA | Seattle men | WCC | 18,100 | 1962 |
| | Dignity Health Arena | Bakersfield | CA | Cal State Bakersfield | Big West | 9,333 | 1998 |

== Future arenas ==
This list includes facilities that are either definitively planned or currently under construction, as well as existing facilities of schools that have announced future moves to NCAA Division I. Conference affiliations reflect those known to be in place as of the team's entry into Division I or the venue's opening, as applicable.

Off-campus arena

| Image | Arena | City | State | Team | Conference | Capacity | Opened/opening |
|---|---|---|---|---|---|---|---|
| | Grand Sierra Resort Arena | Reno | NV | Nevada (men) | MW | 10,000 | 2027 |
| | Kalamazoo Event Center | Kalamazoo | MI | Western Michigan | MAC | 6,500 | 2027 |
| | New Miami University arena | Oxford | OH | Miami (OH) | MAC | TBA | 2028 |
| | New Northeastern arena | Boston | MA | Northeastern | CAA | 5,300 | 2028 |
| | New Alabama Arena | Tuscaloosa | AL | Alabama | SEC | 10,136 | TBA |
| | New LSU Arena | Baton Rouge | LA | LSU | SEC | TBA | TBA |
| | New Marshall Arena | Huntington | WV | Marshall | Sun Belt | 8,500 | TBA |

== Interior gallery ==
NCAA Division I basketball arenas

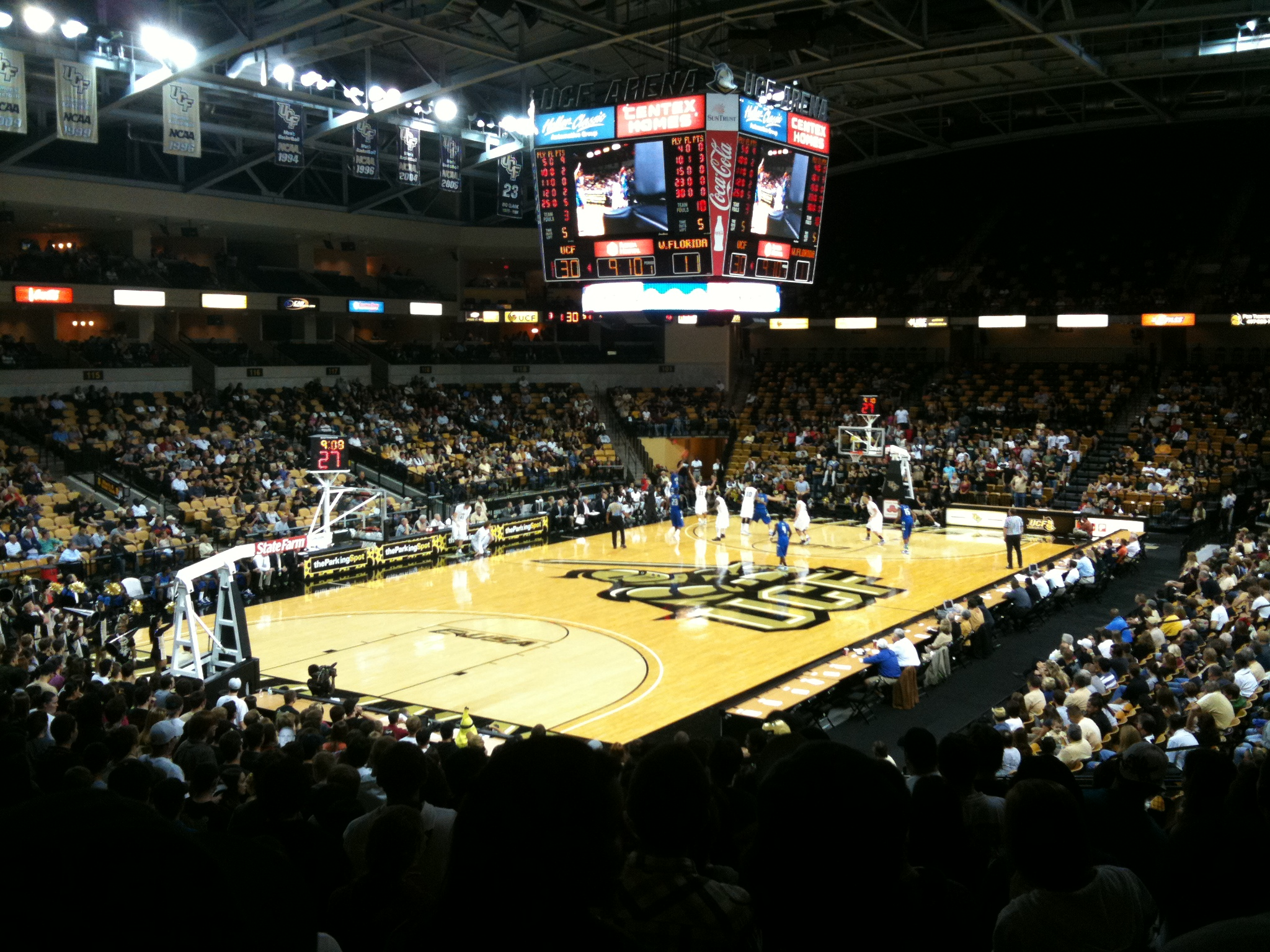
Addition Financial Arena (UCF)

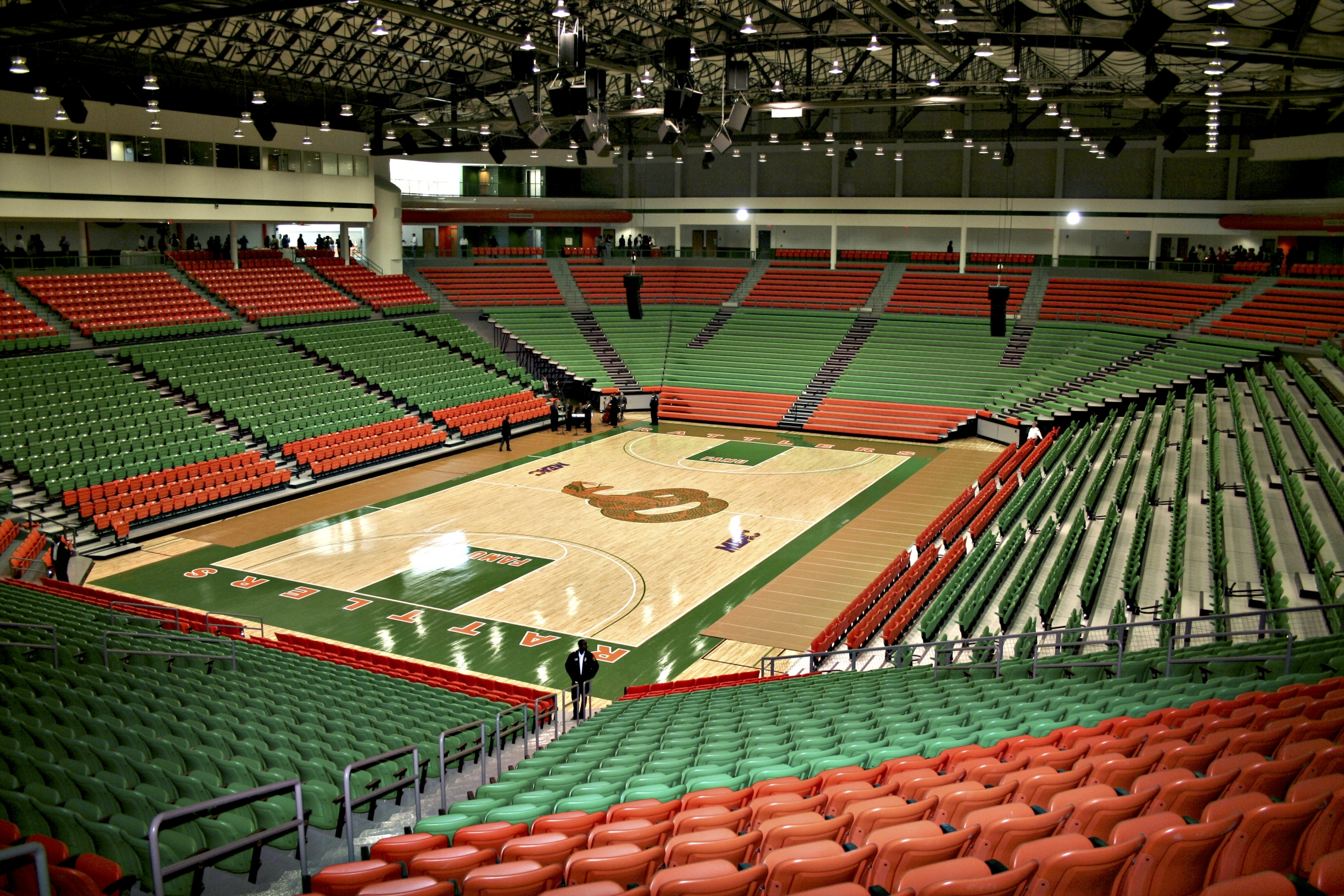
Al Lawson Center (Florida A&M)

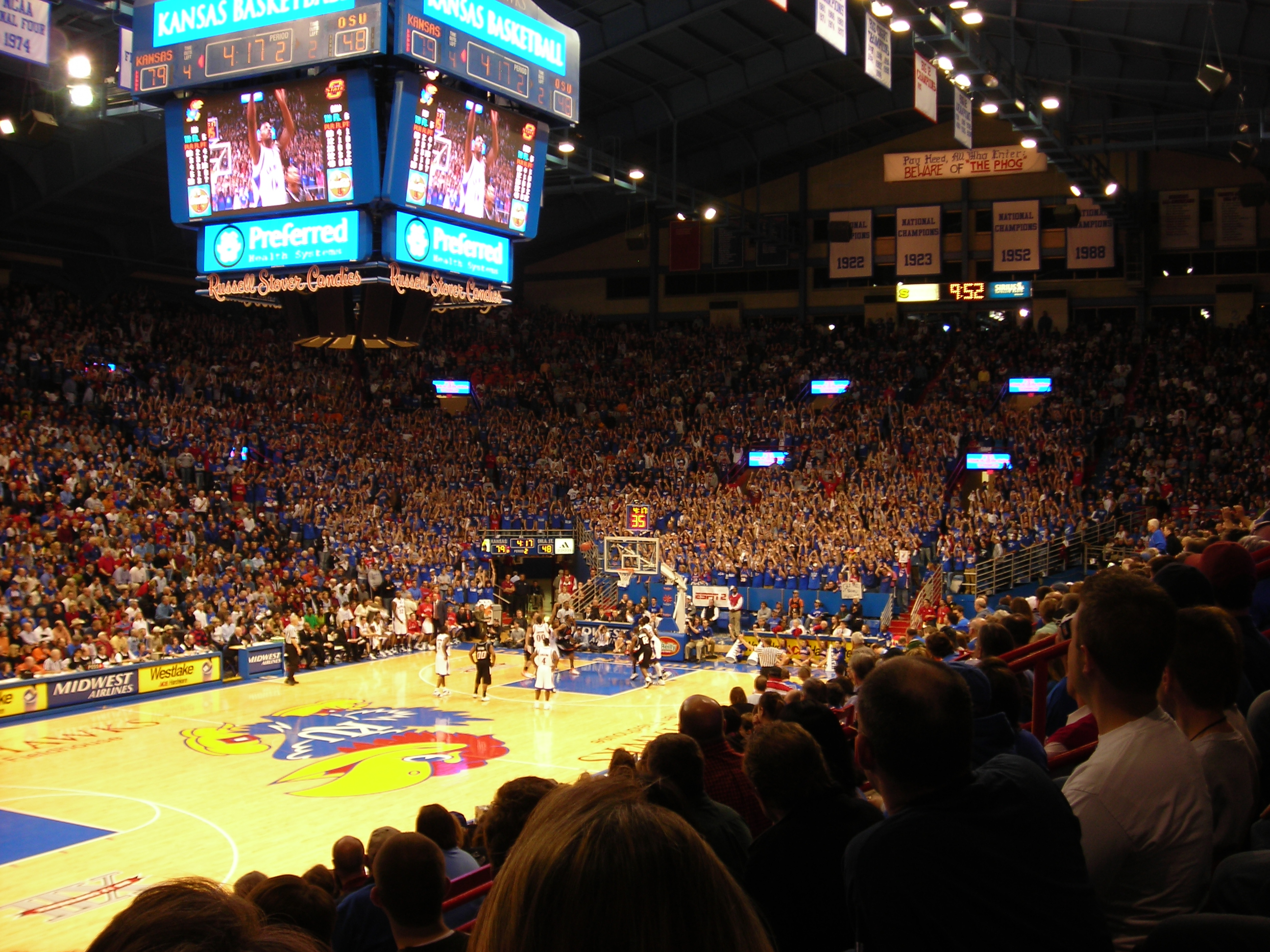
Allen Fieldhouse (Kansas)

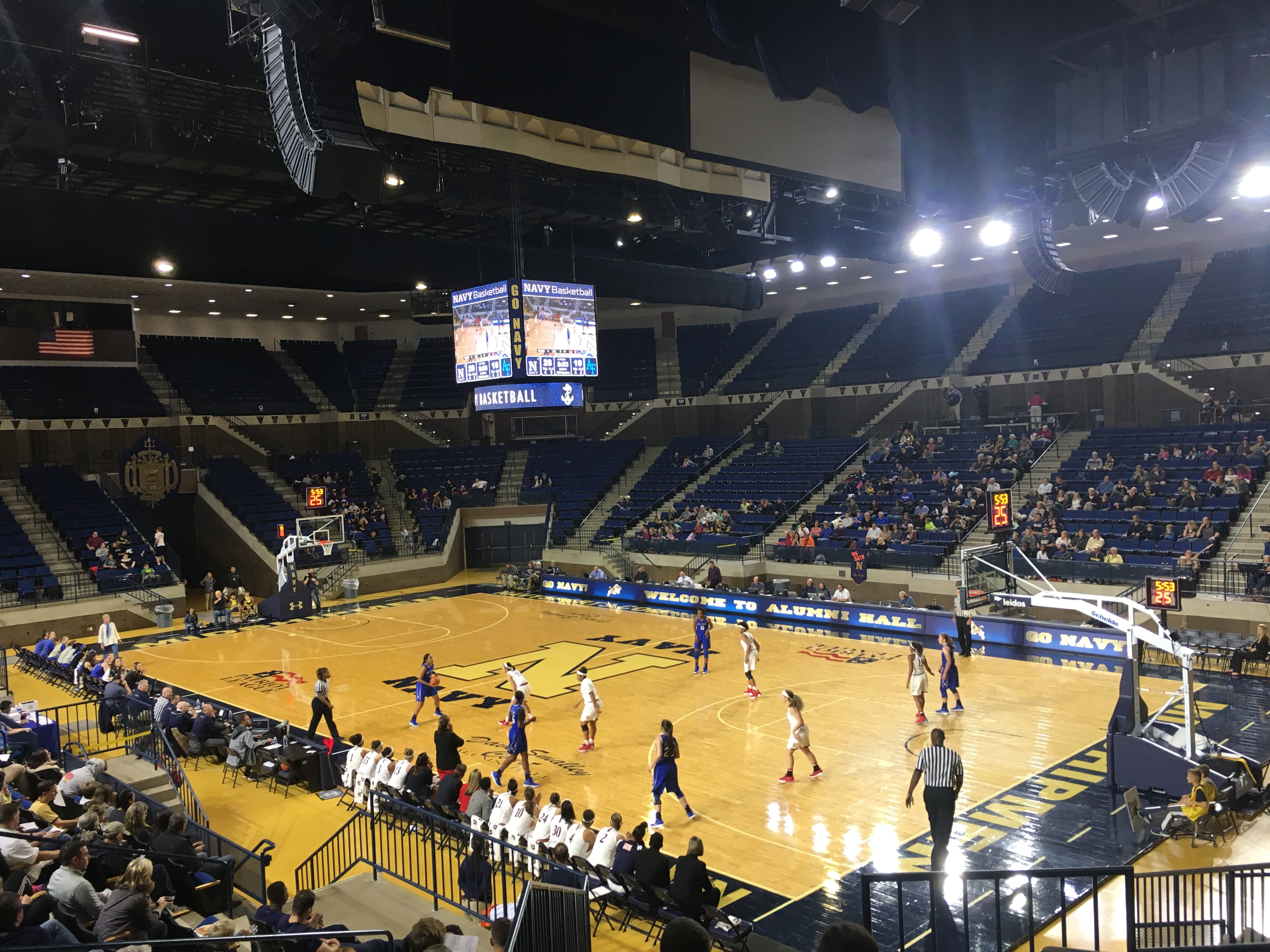
Alumni Hall (Navy)

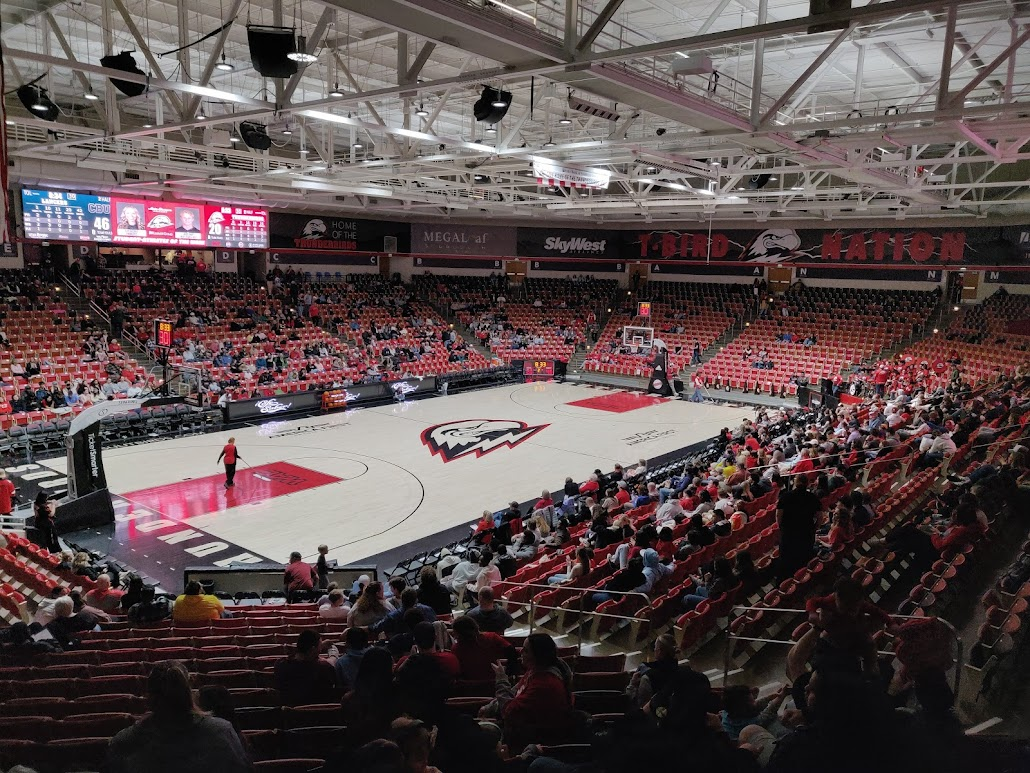
America First Event Center (Southern Utah Thunderbirds)

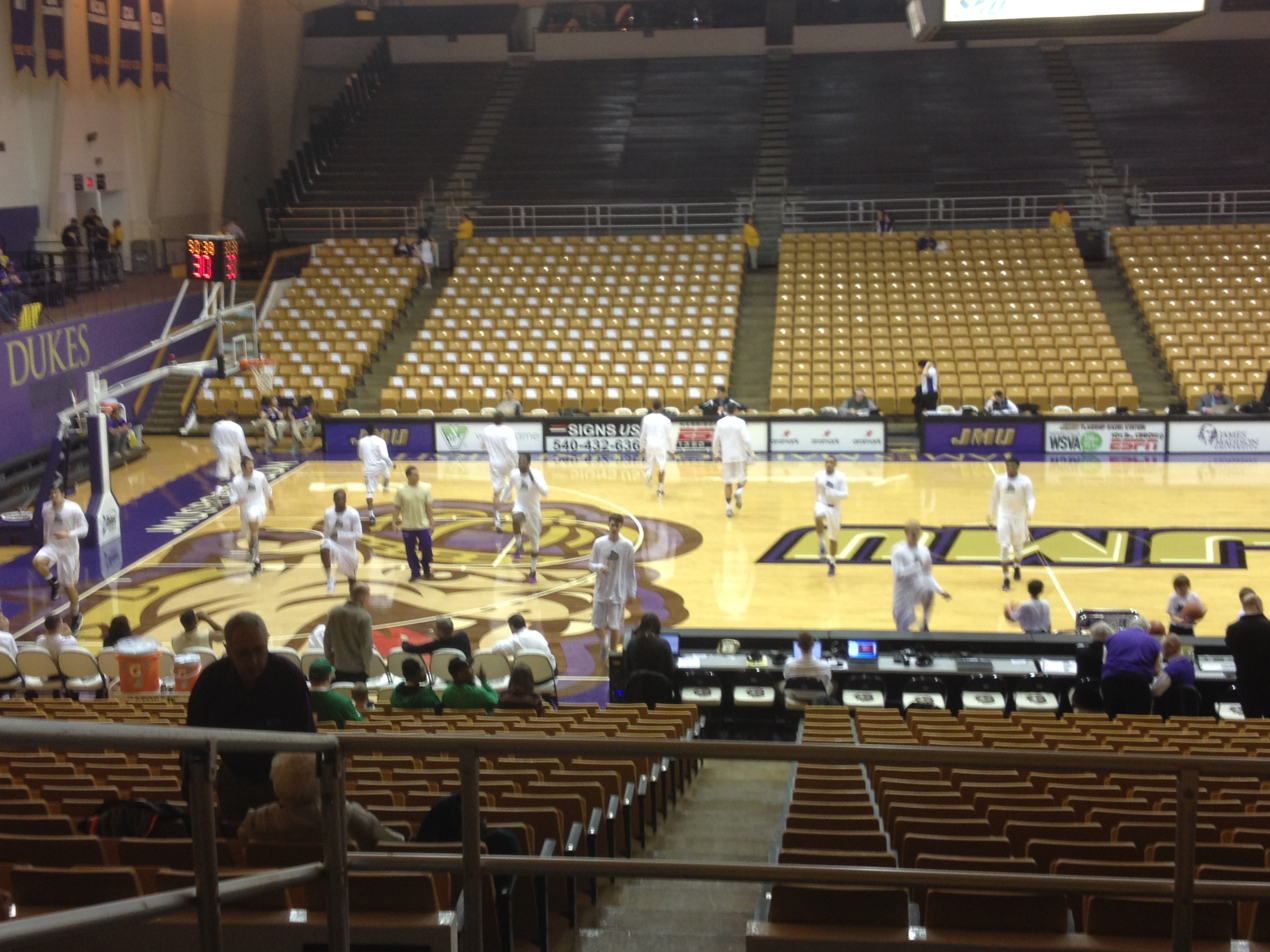
Atlantic Union Bank Center (James Madison)

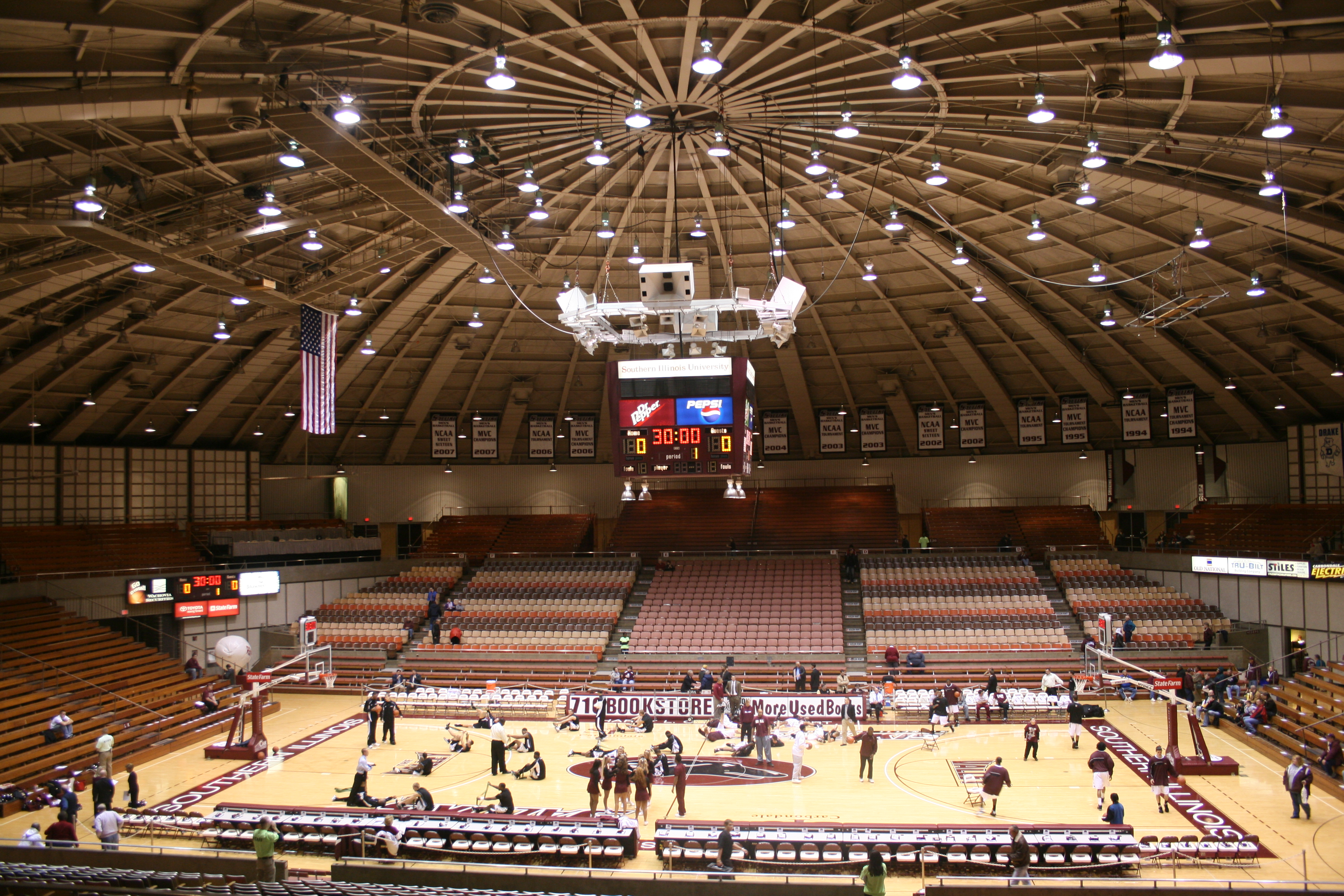
Banterra Center (Southern Illinois)

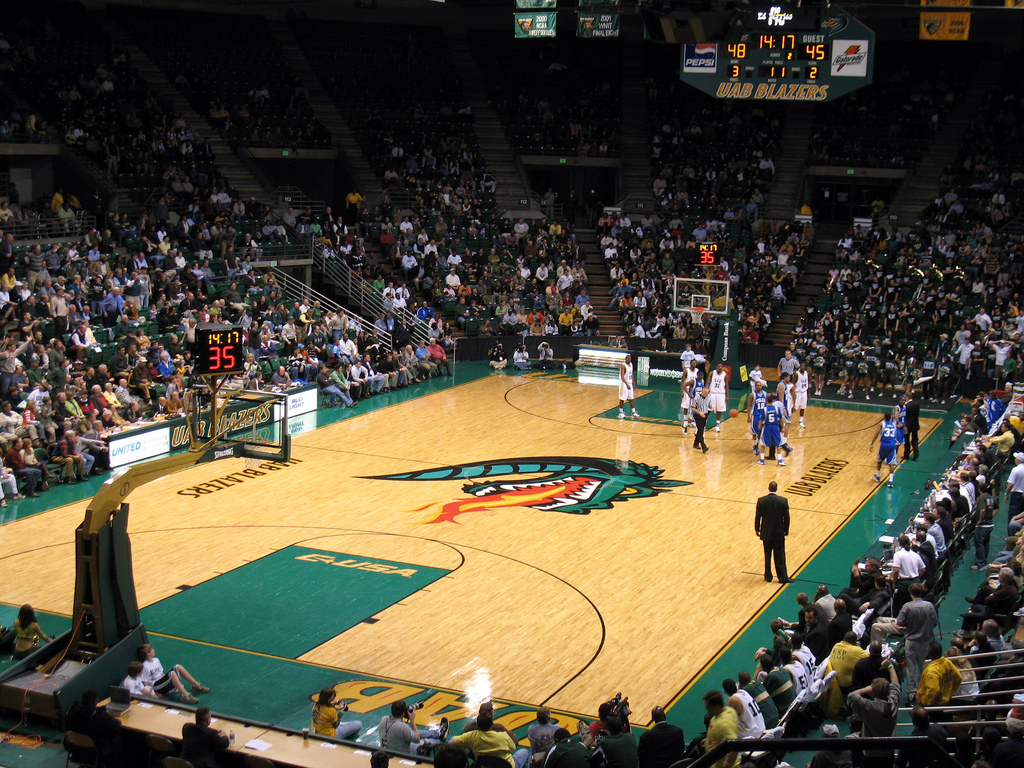
Bartow Arena (UAB)

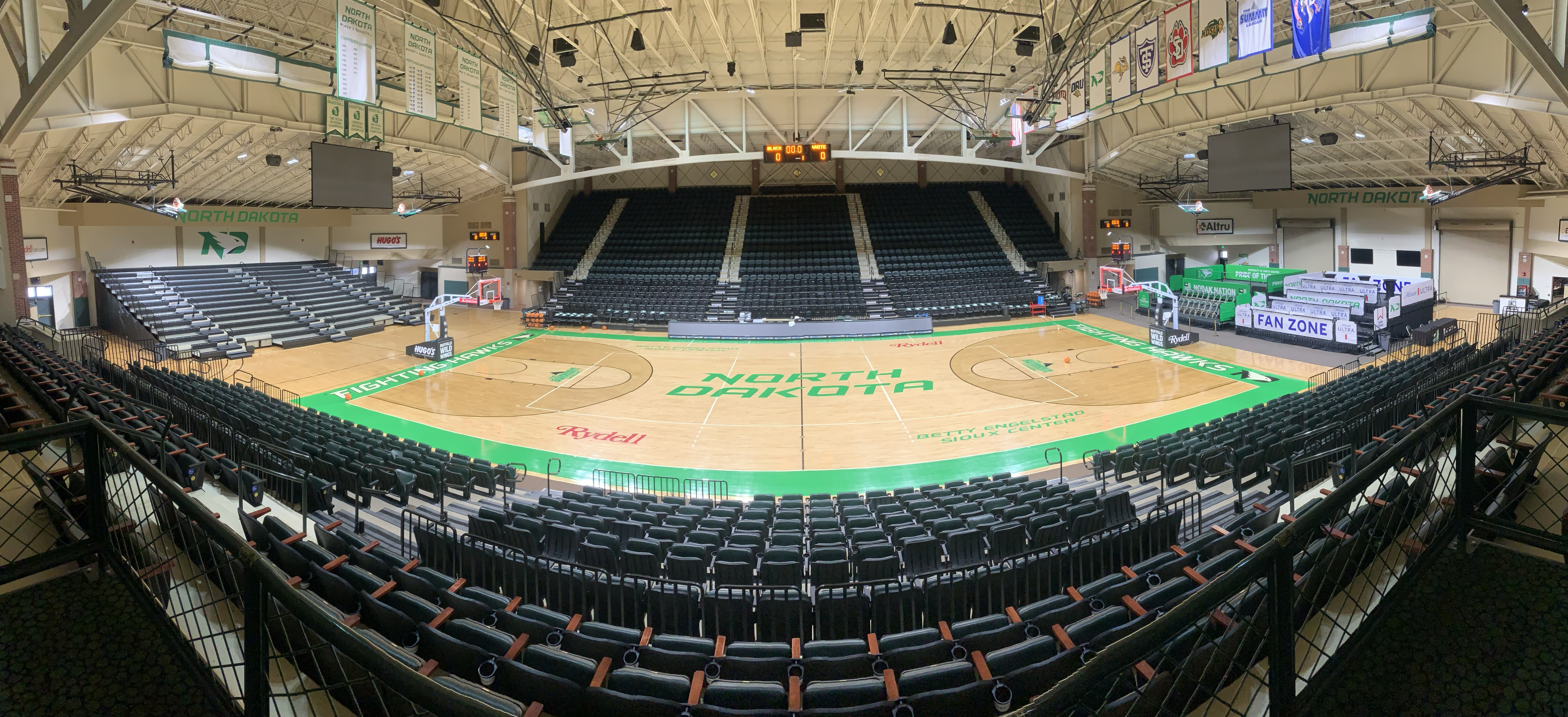
Betty Engelstad Sioux Center (North Dakota)

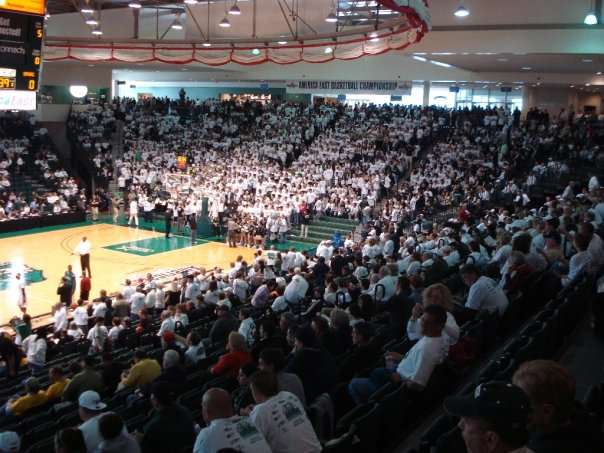
Binghamton University Events Center (Binghamton)

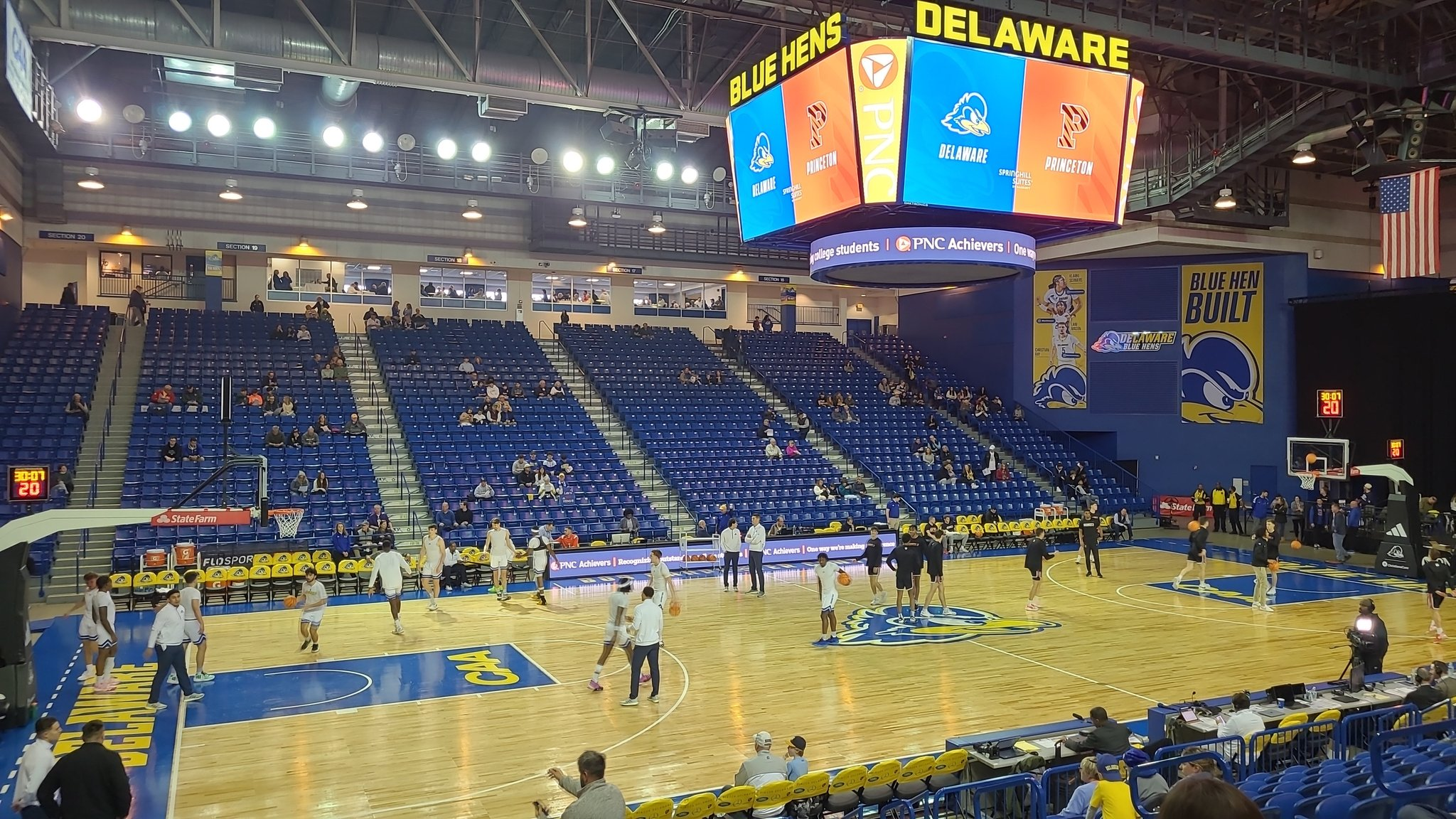
Bob Carpenter Center (Delaware)

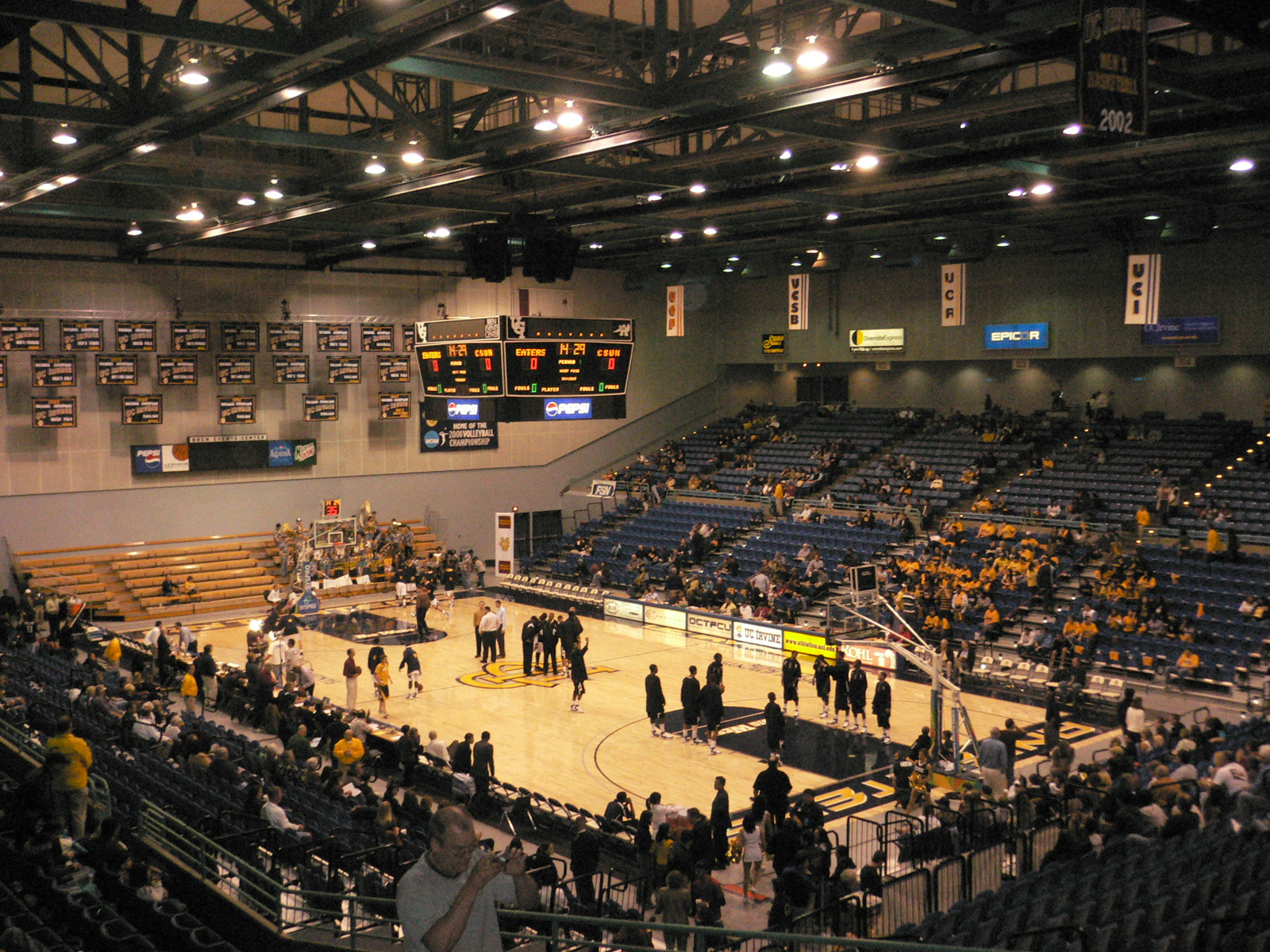
Bren Events Center (UC Irvine)

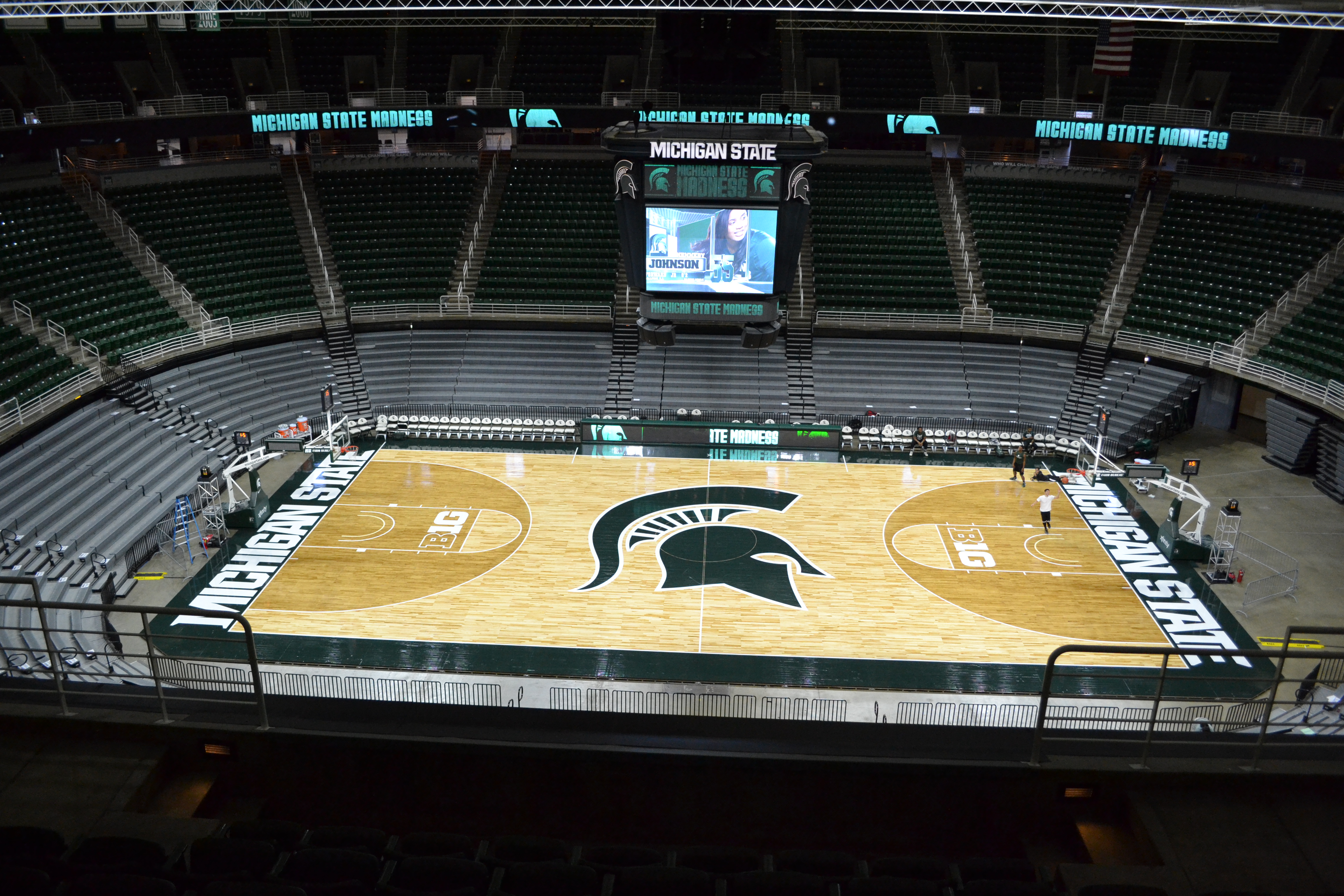
Breslin Student Events Center (Michigan State)

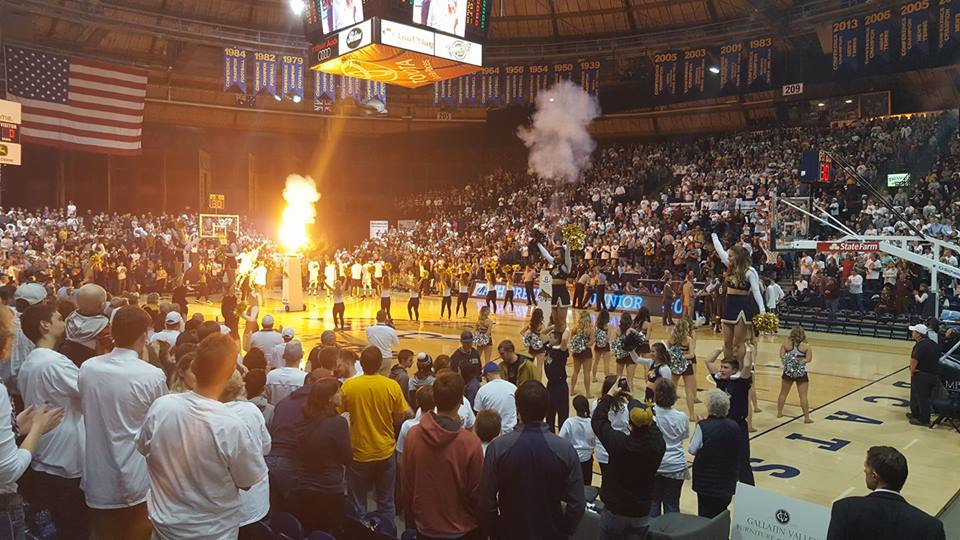
Brick Breeden Fieldhouse (Montana State)

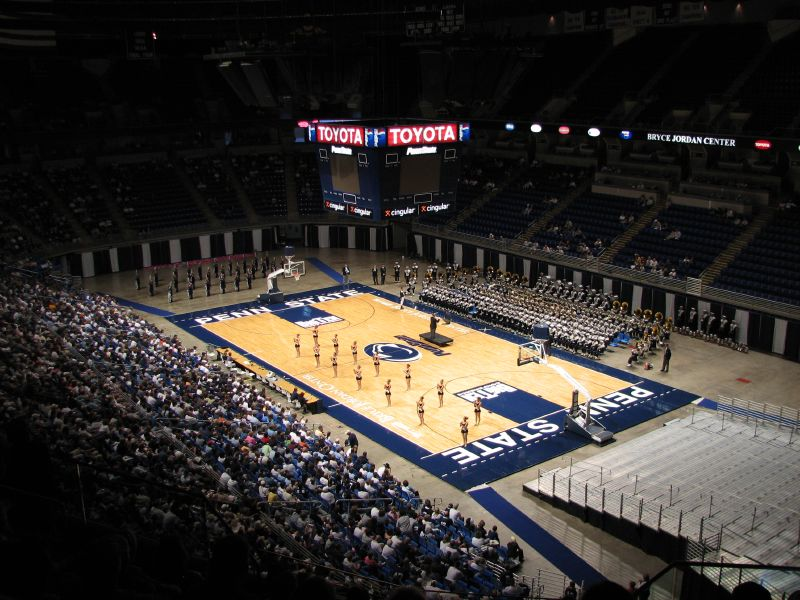
Bryce Jordan Center (Penn State)

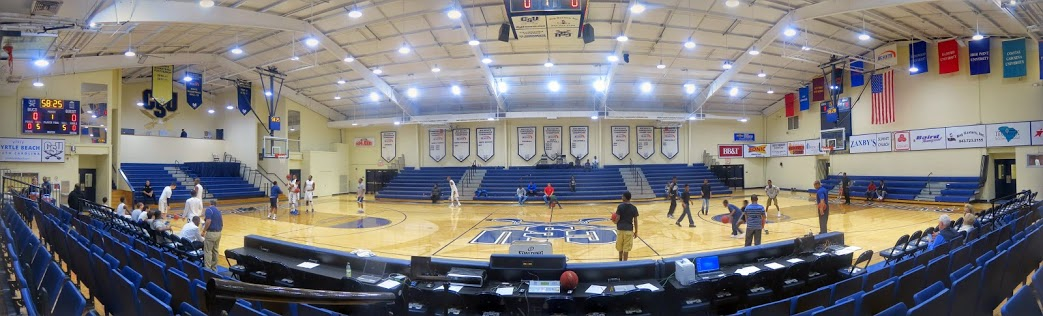
Buccaneer Field House (Charleston Southern)

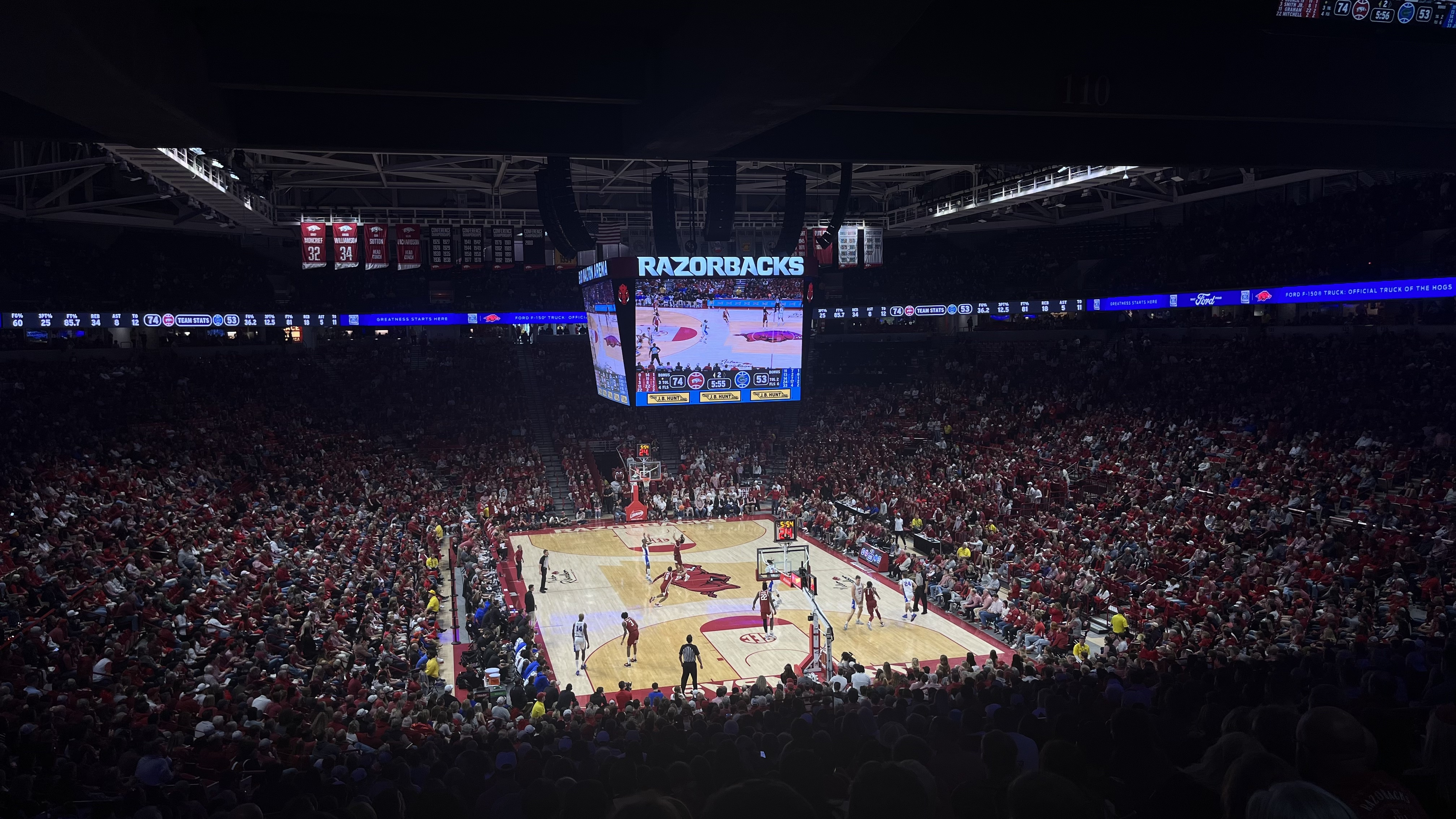
Bud Walton Arena (Arkansas)

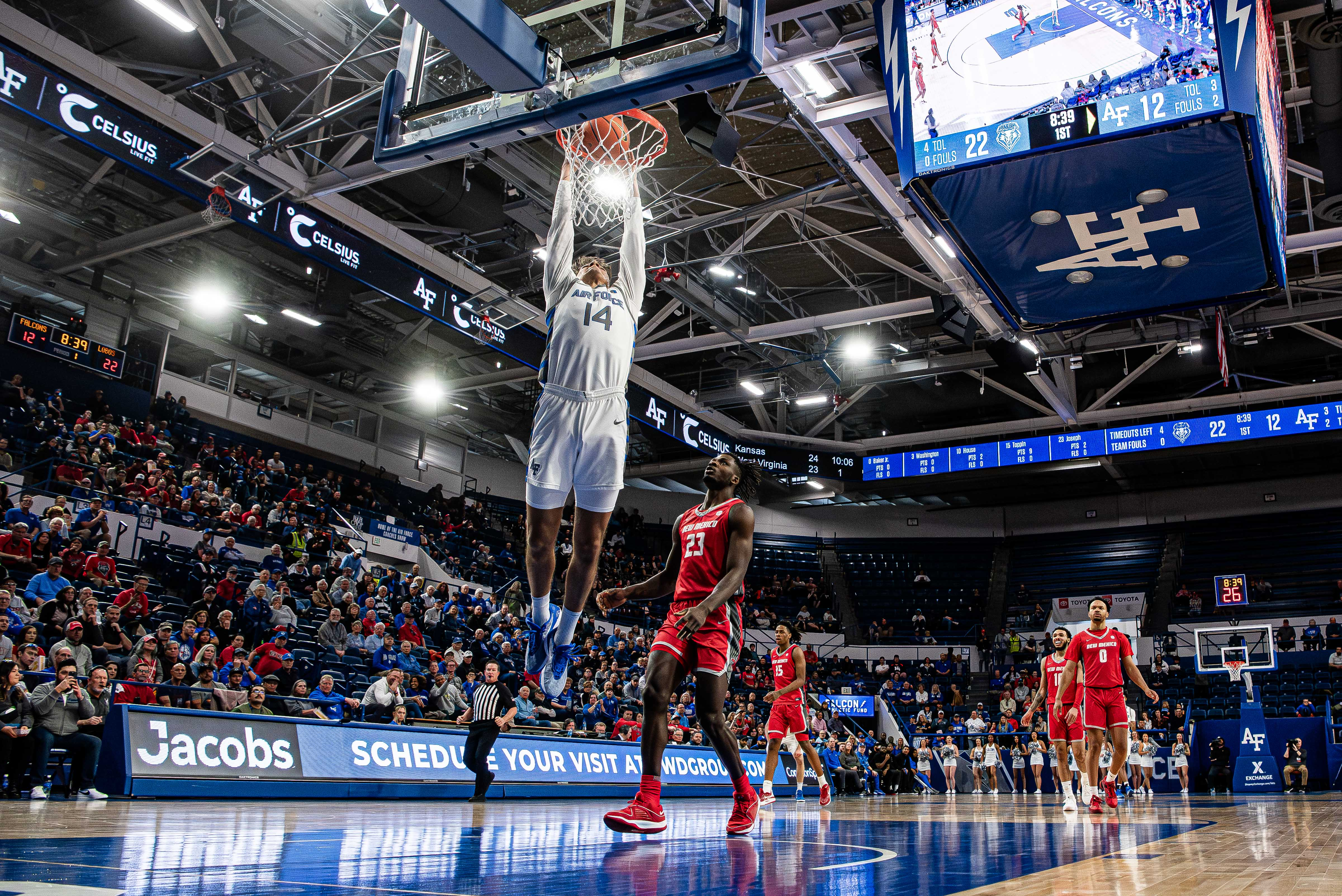
Cadet Field House (Air Force)

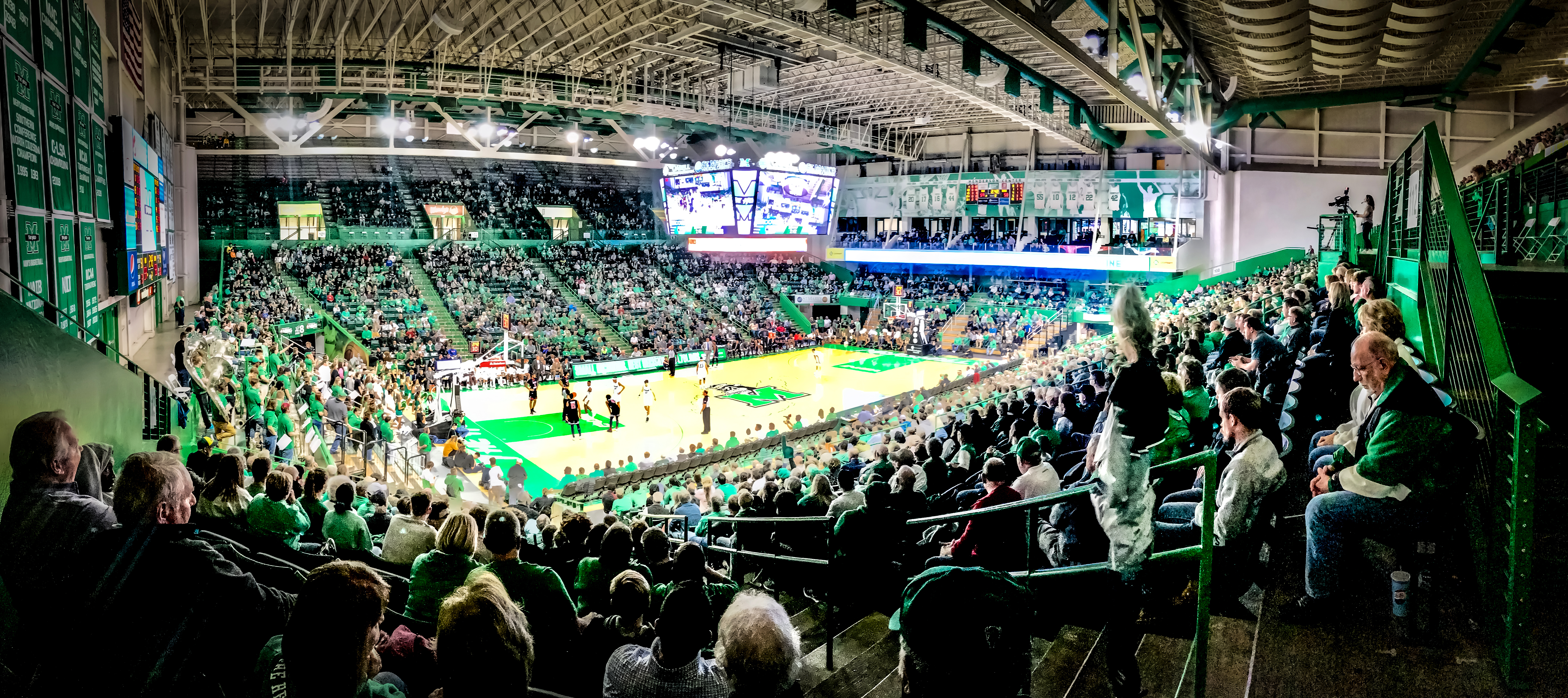
Cam Henderson Center (Marshall)

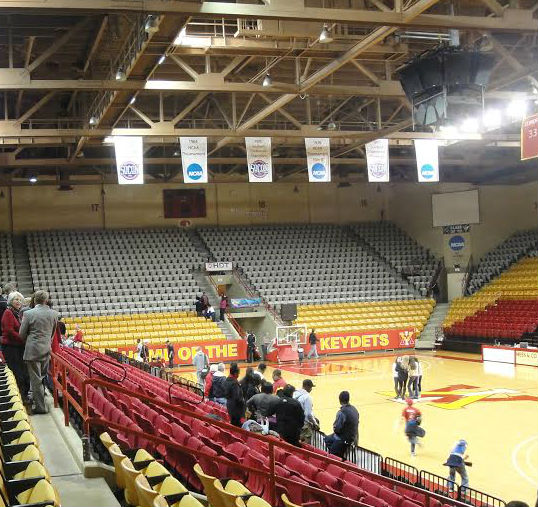
Cameron Hall (arena) (VMI)

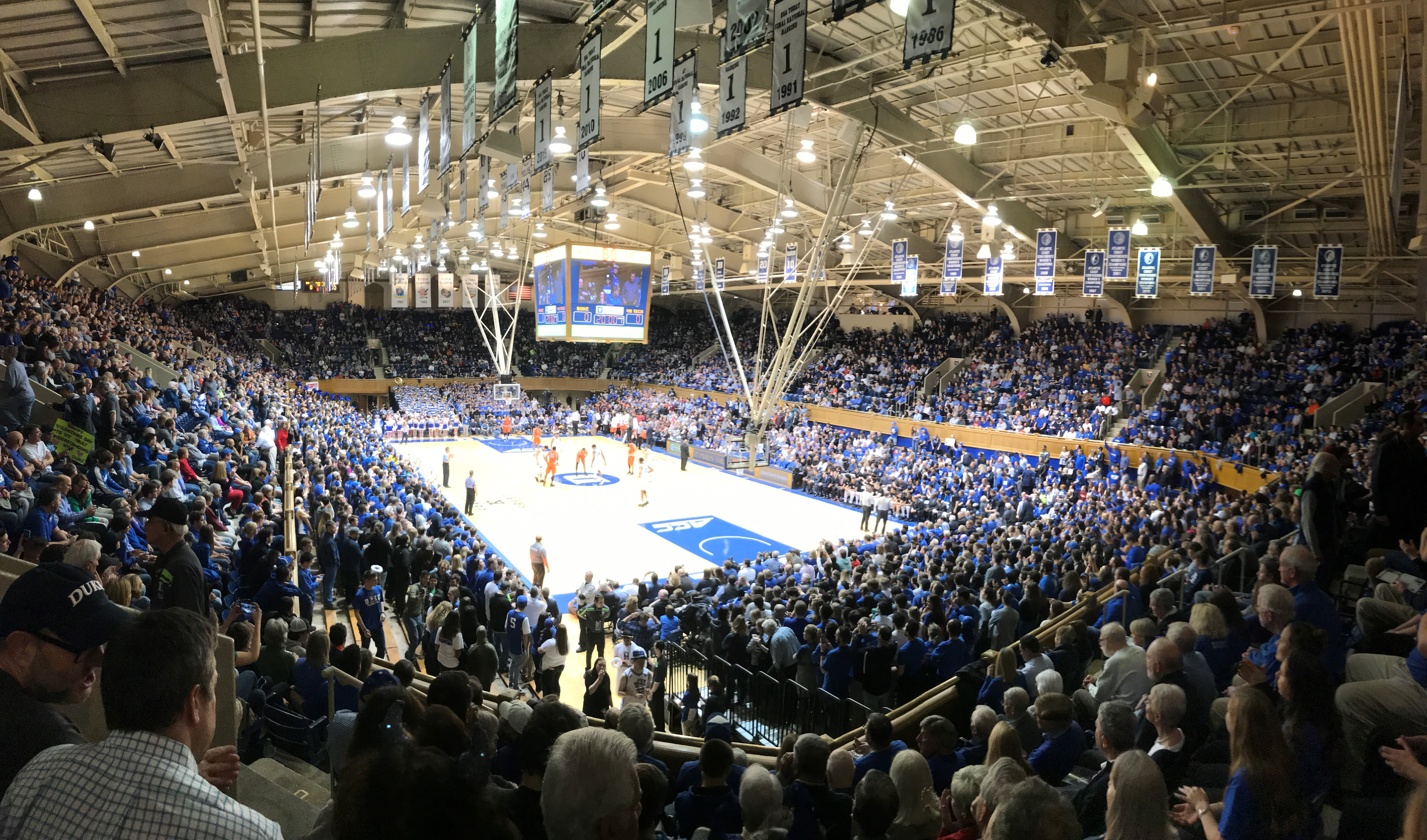
Cameron Indoor Stadium (Duke)

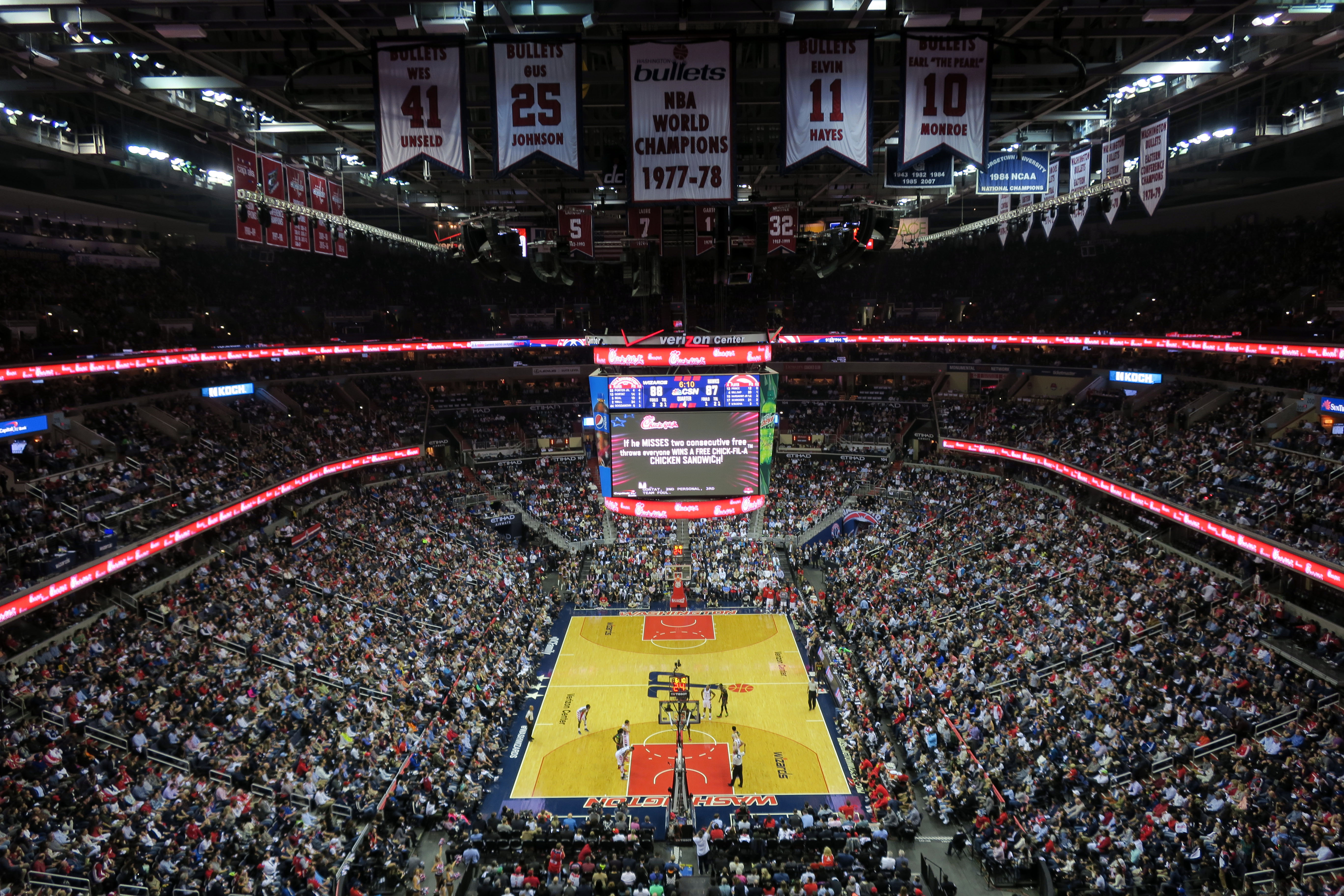
Capital One Arena (Georgetown)

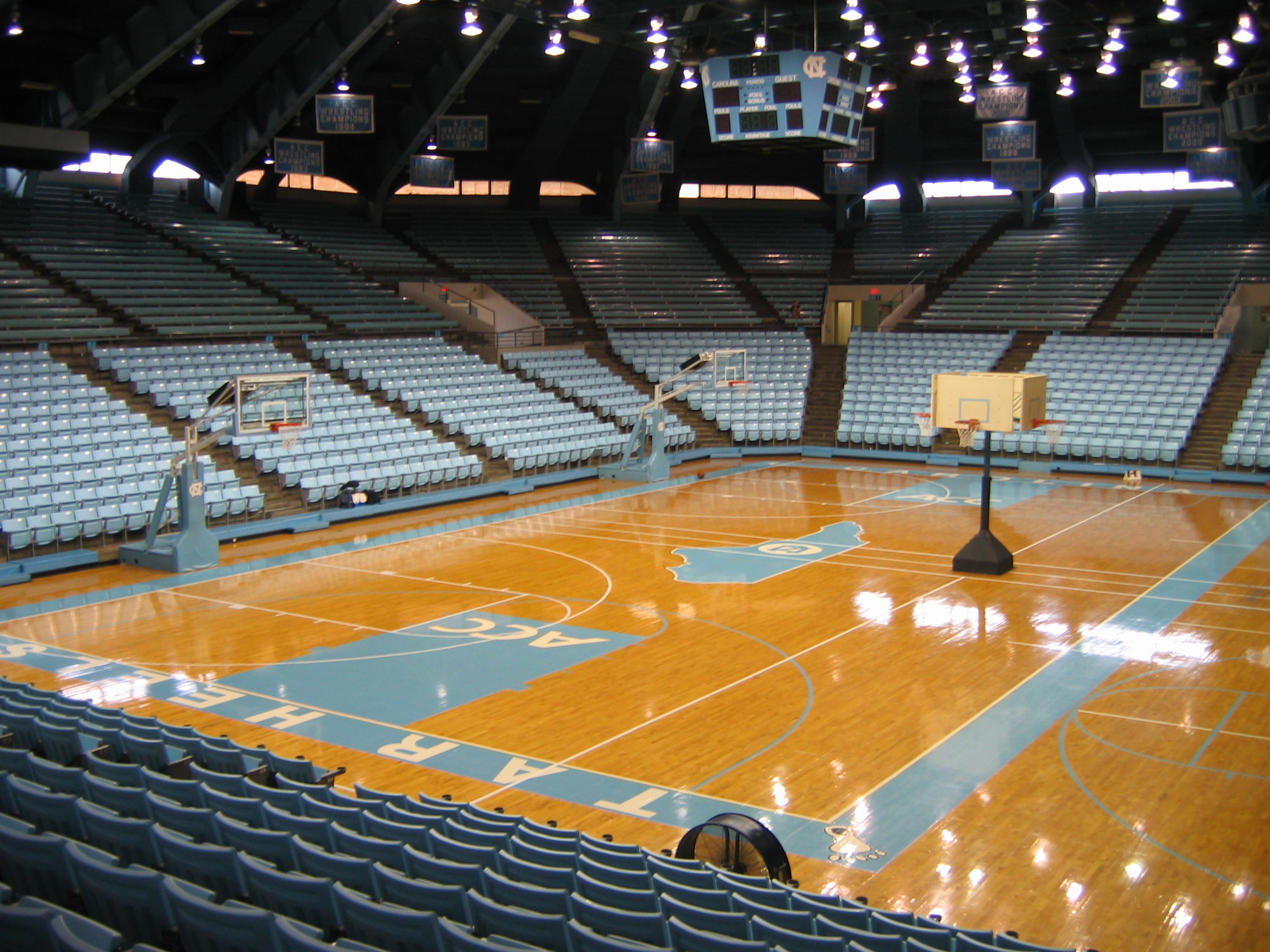
Carmichael Auditorium (North Carolina)

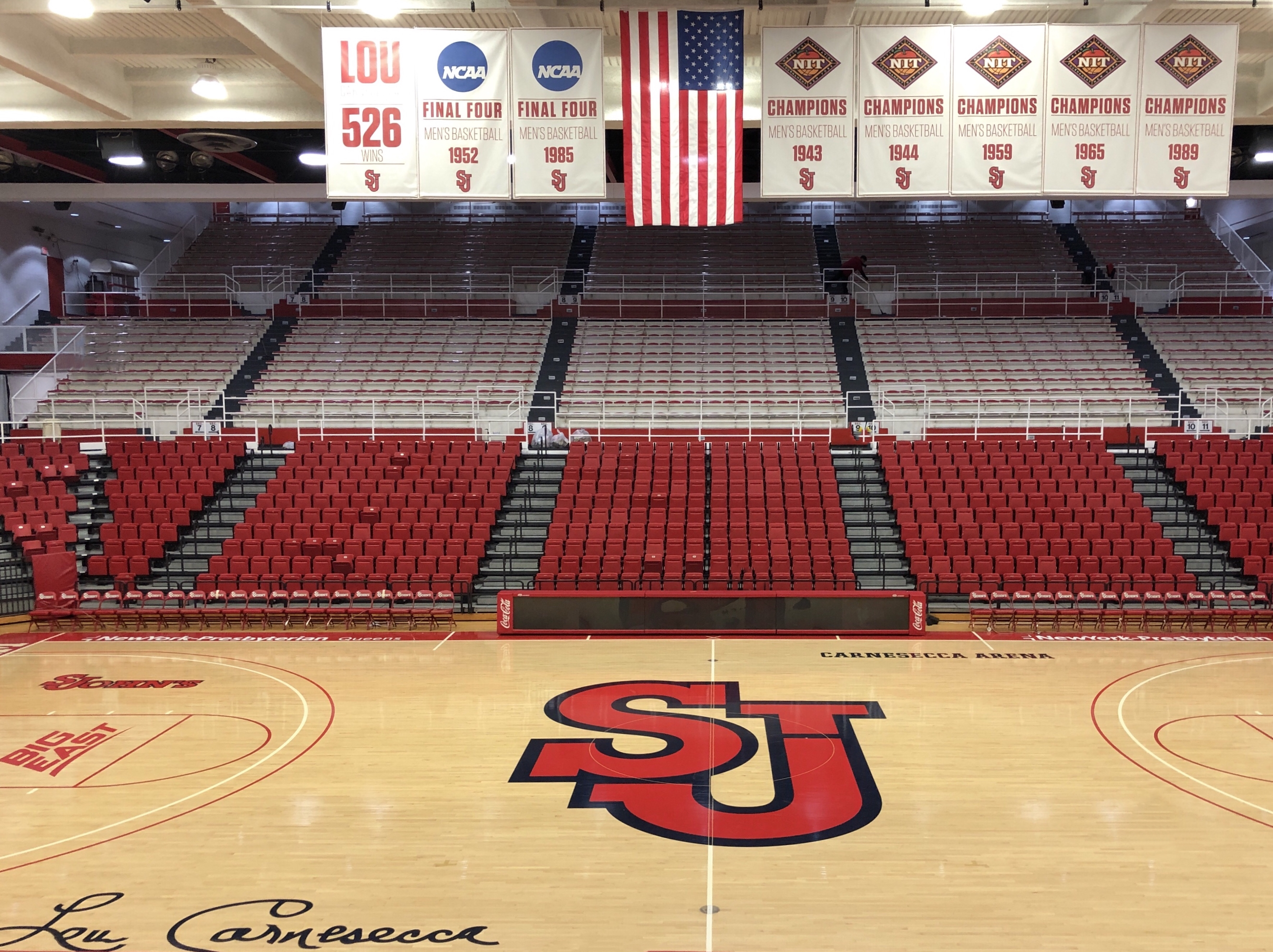
Carnesecca Arena (St. John's)

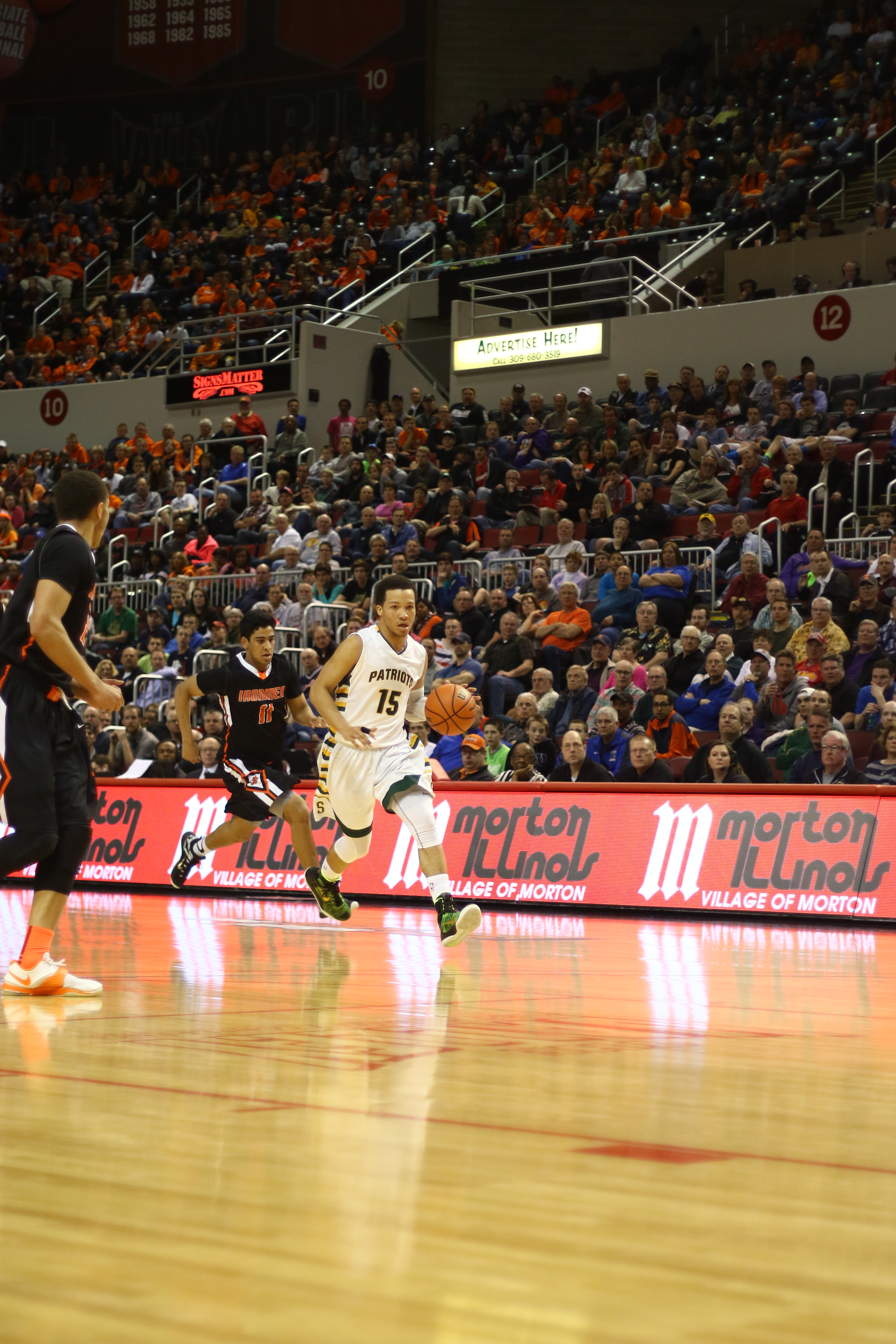
Carver Arena (Bradley)

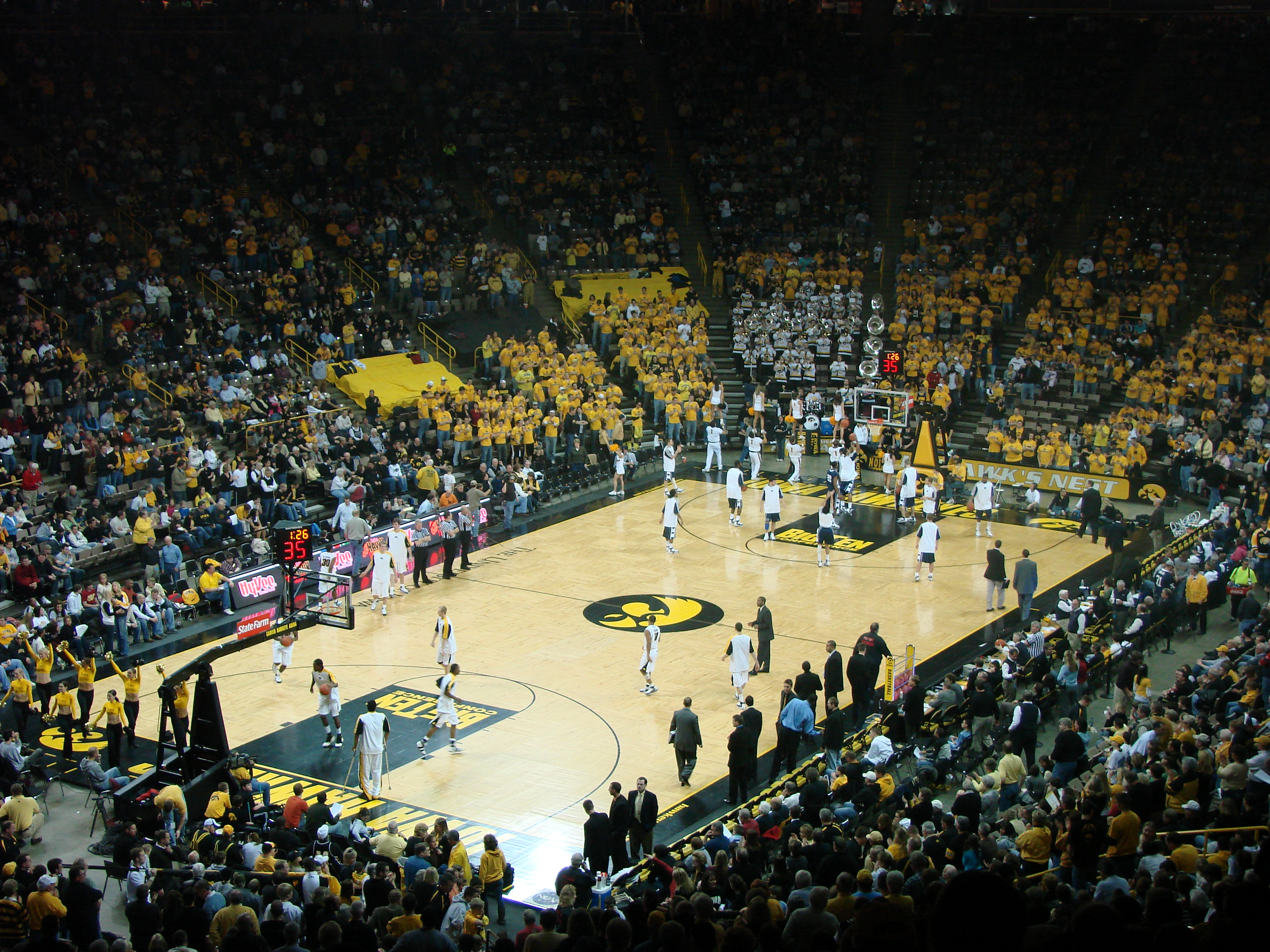
Carver-Hawkeye Arena (Iowa)

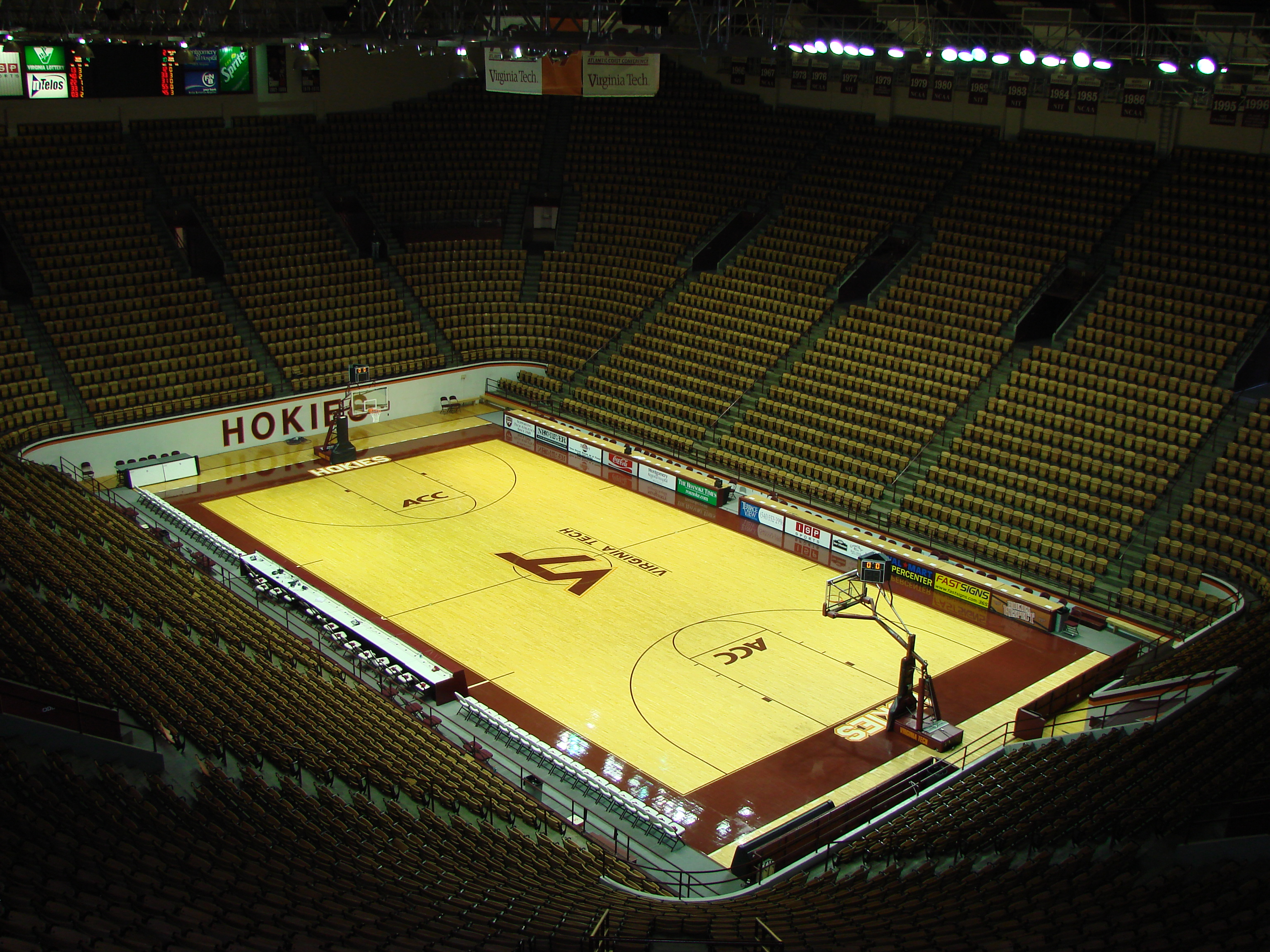
Cassell Coliseum (Virginia Tech)

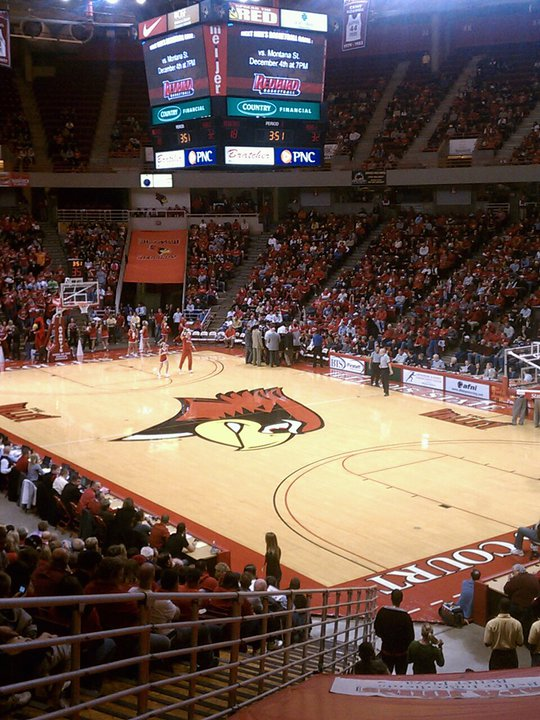
CEFCU Arena (Illinois State)

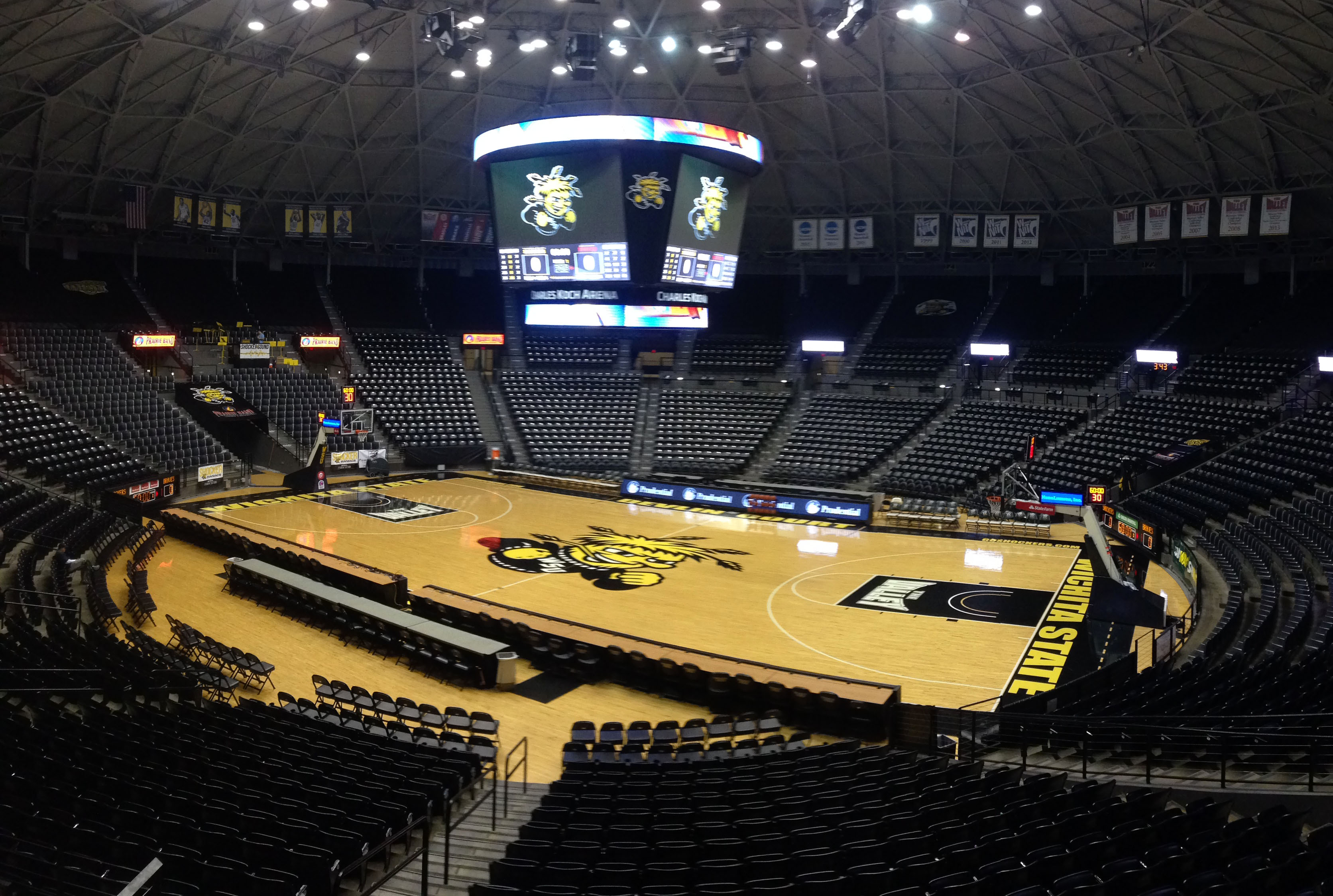
Charles Koch Arena (Wichita State)

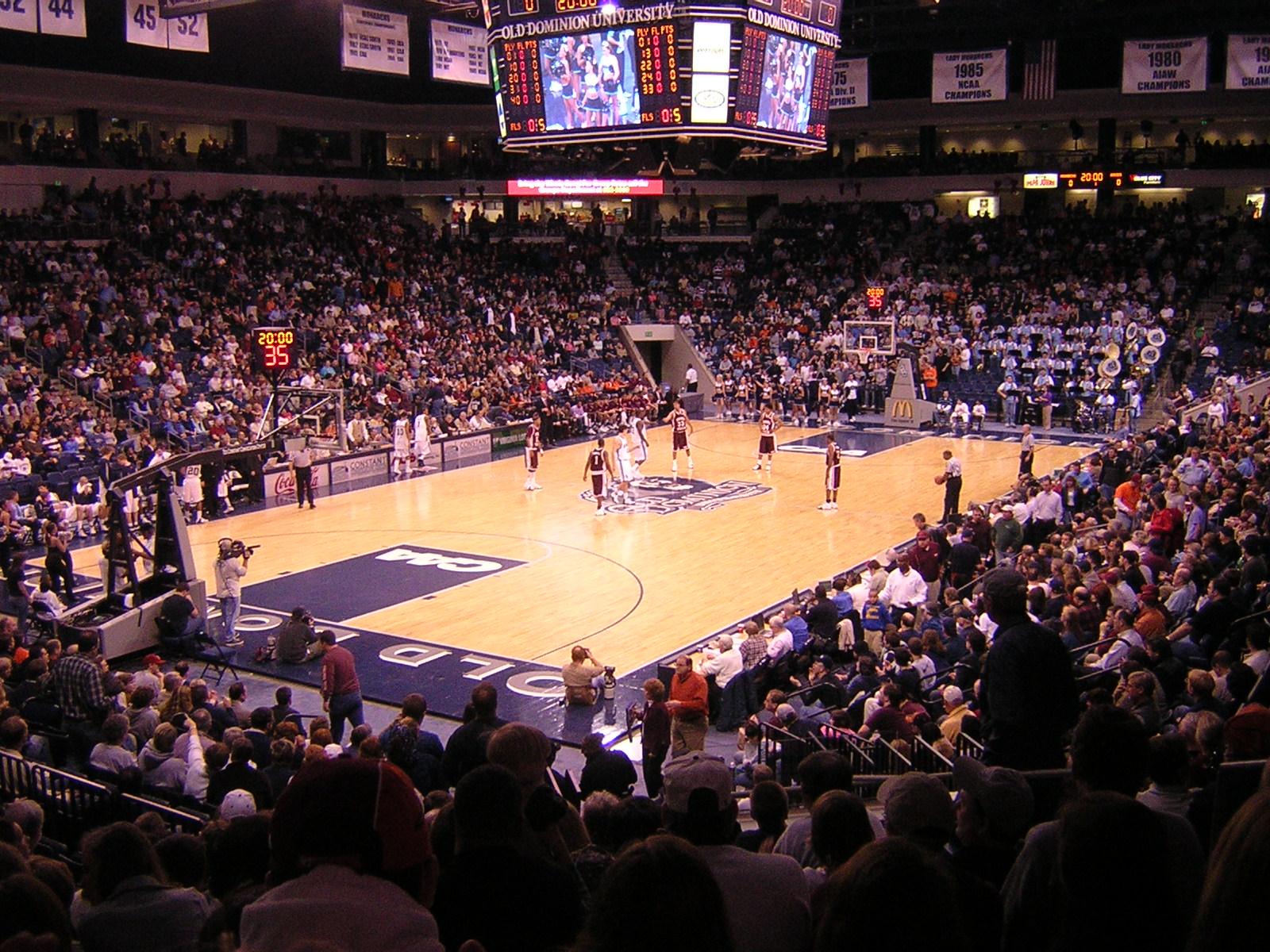
Chartway Arena (Old Dominion)

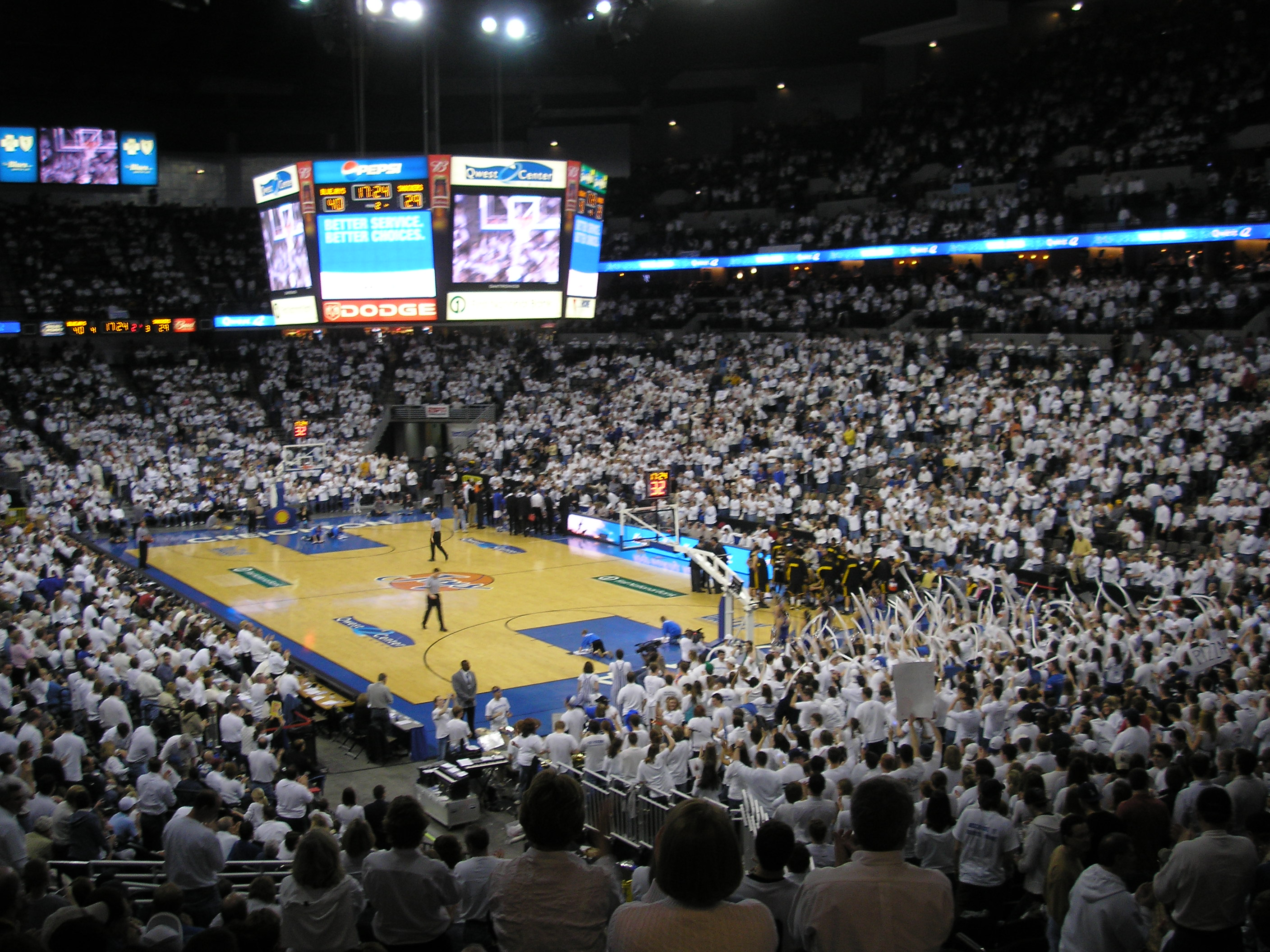
CHI Health Center Omaha (Creighton)

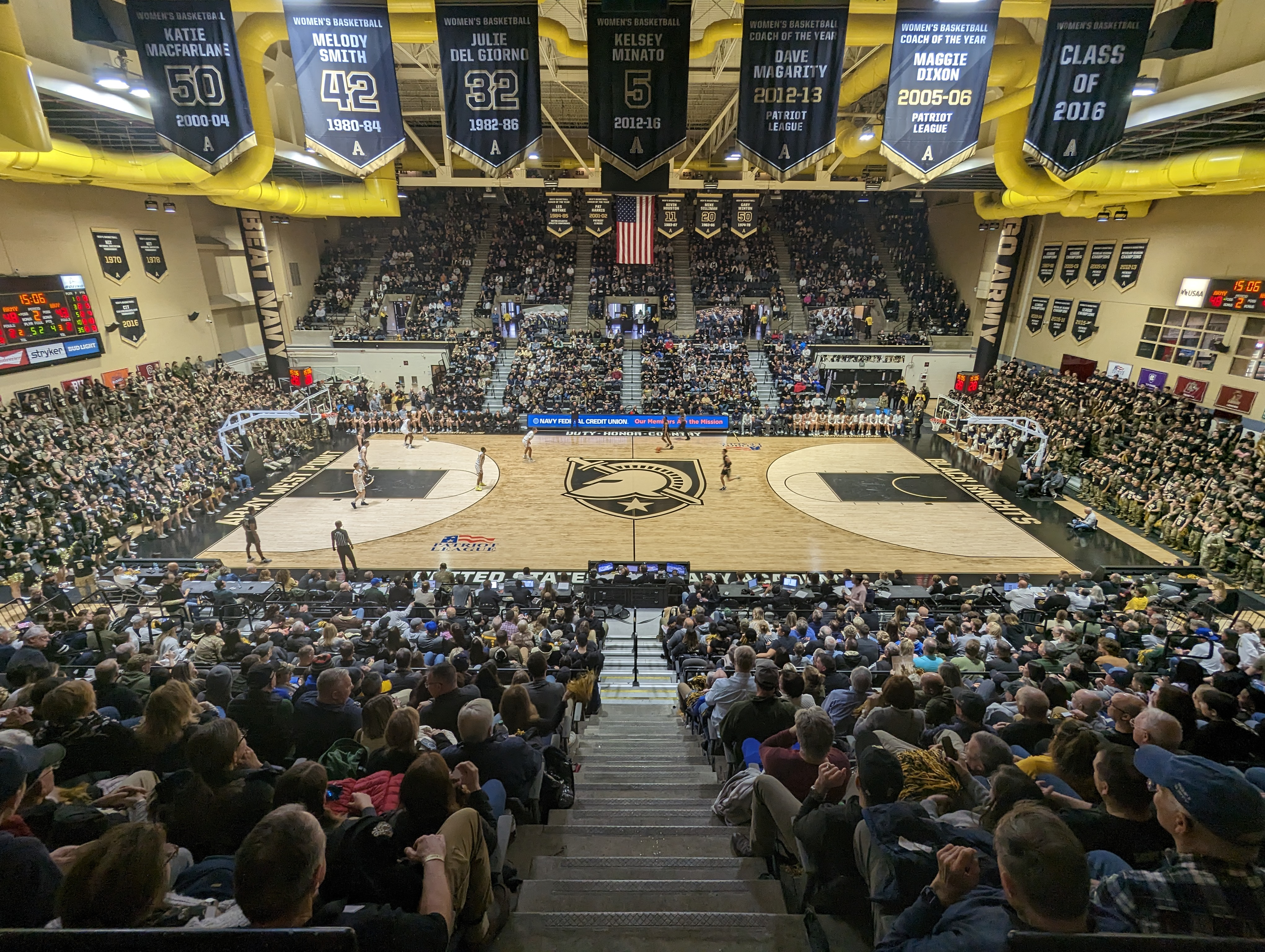
Christl Arena (Army)

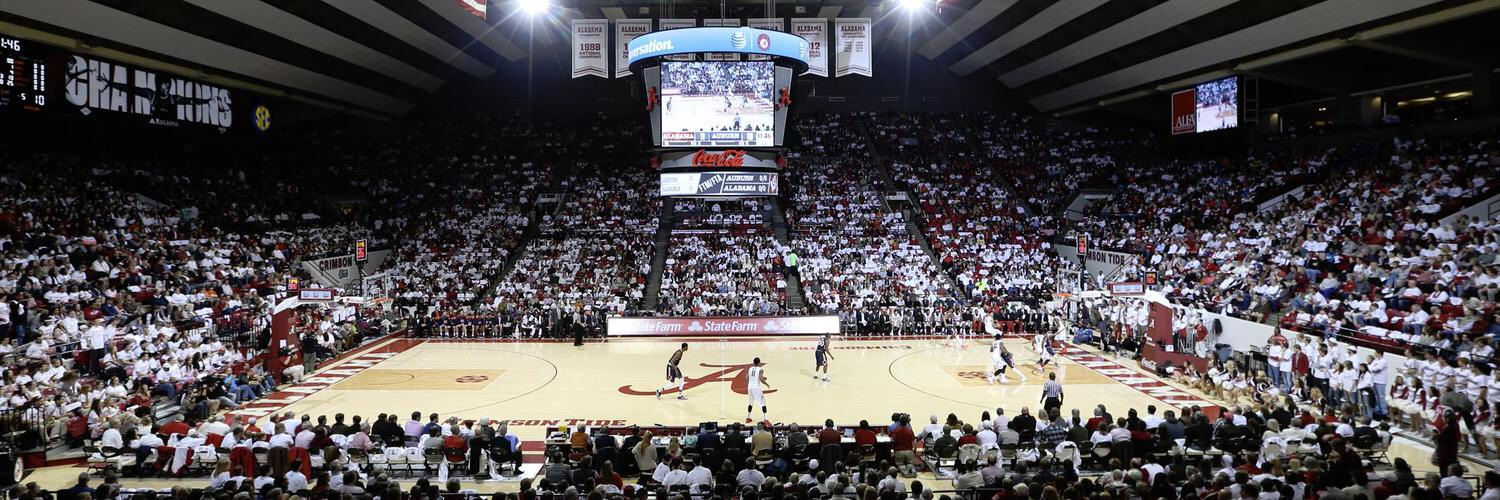
Coleman Coliseum (Alabama)

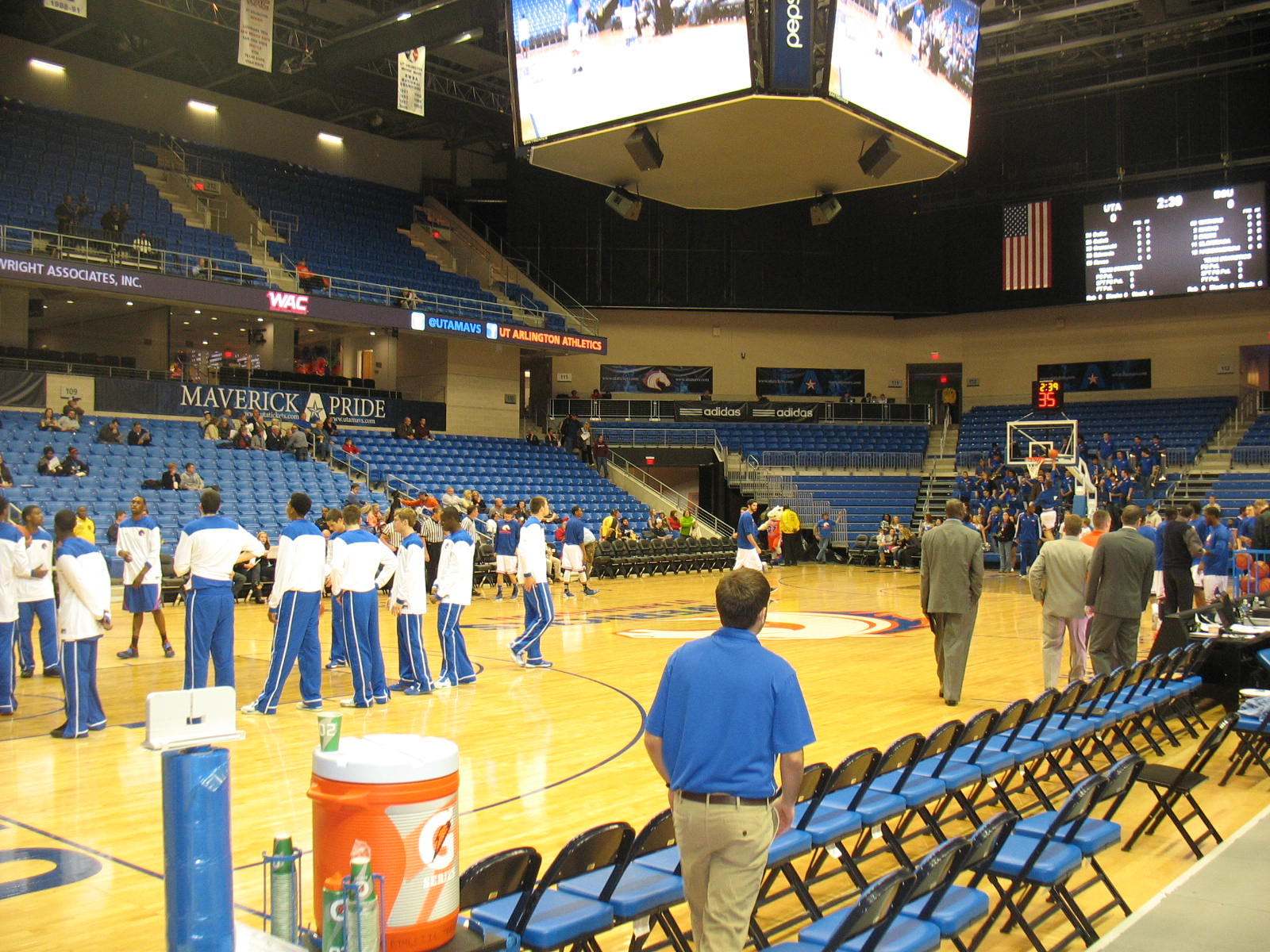
College Park Center (UT Arlington)

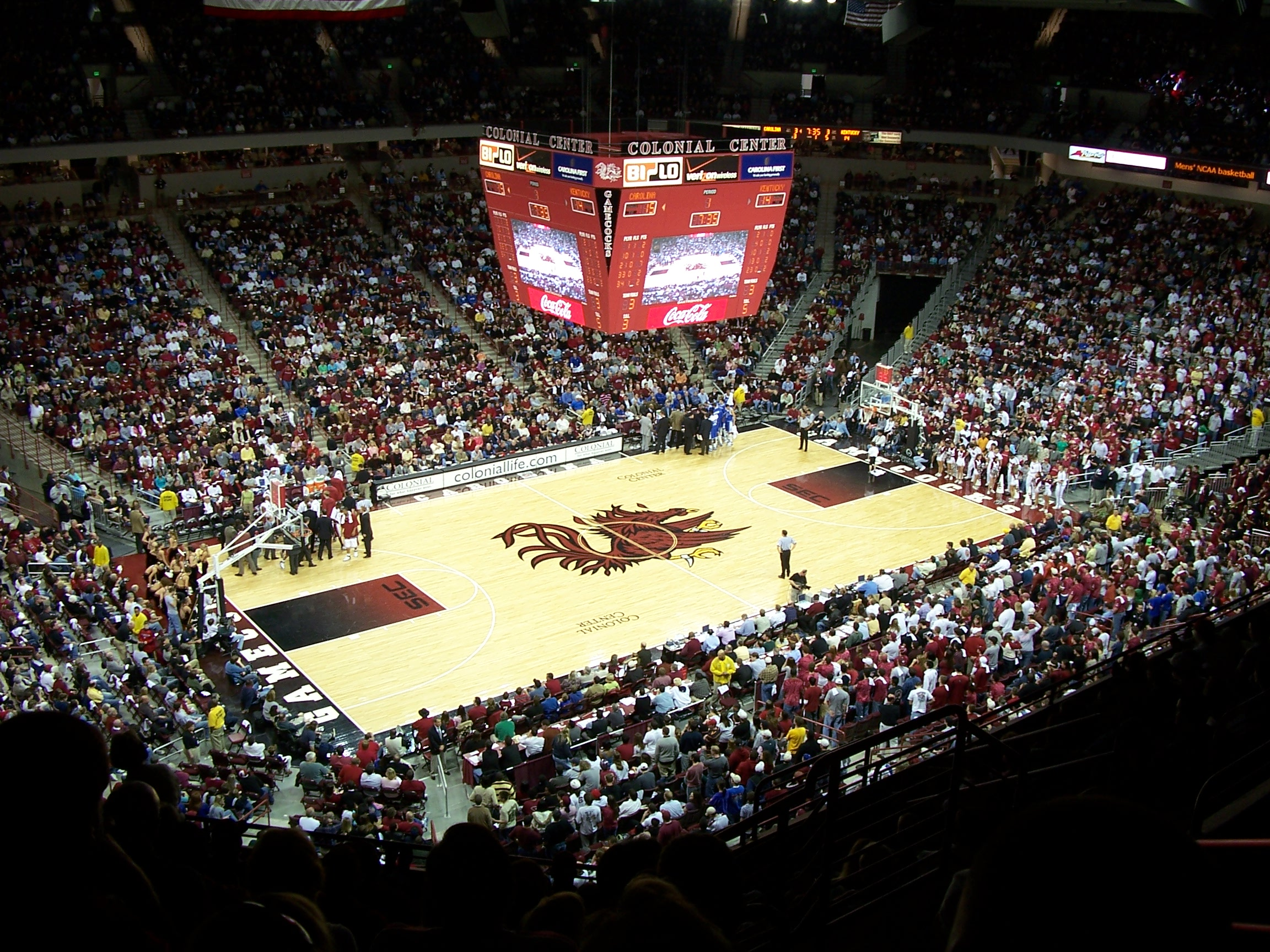
Colonial Life Arena (South Carolina)

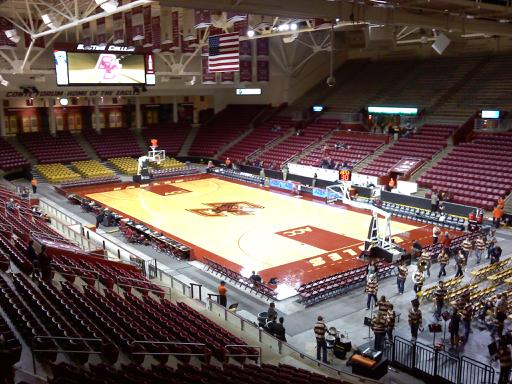
Conte Forum (Boston College)

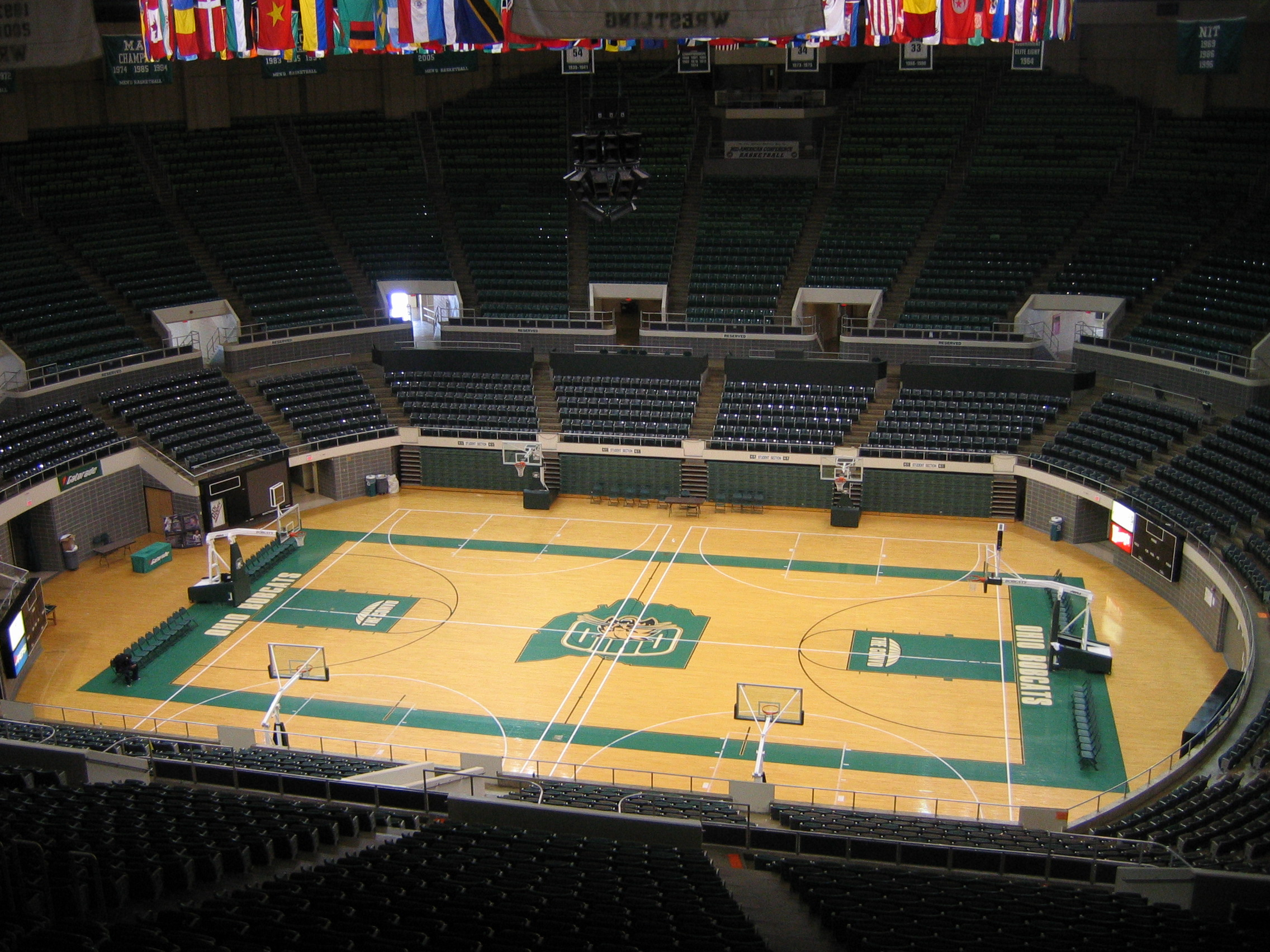
Convocation Center (Ohio University)

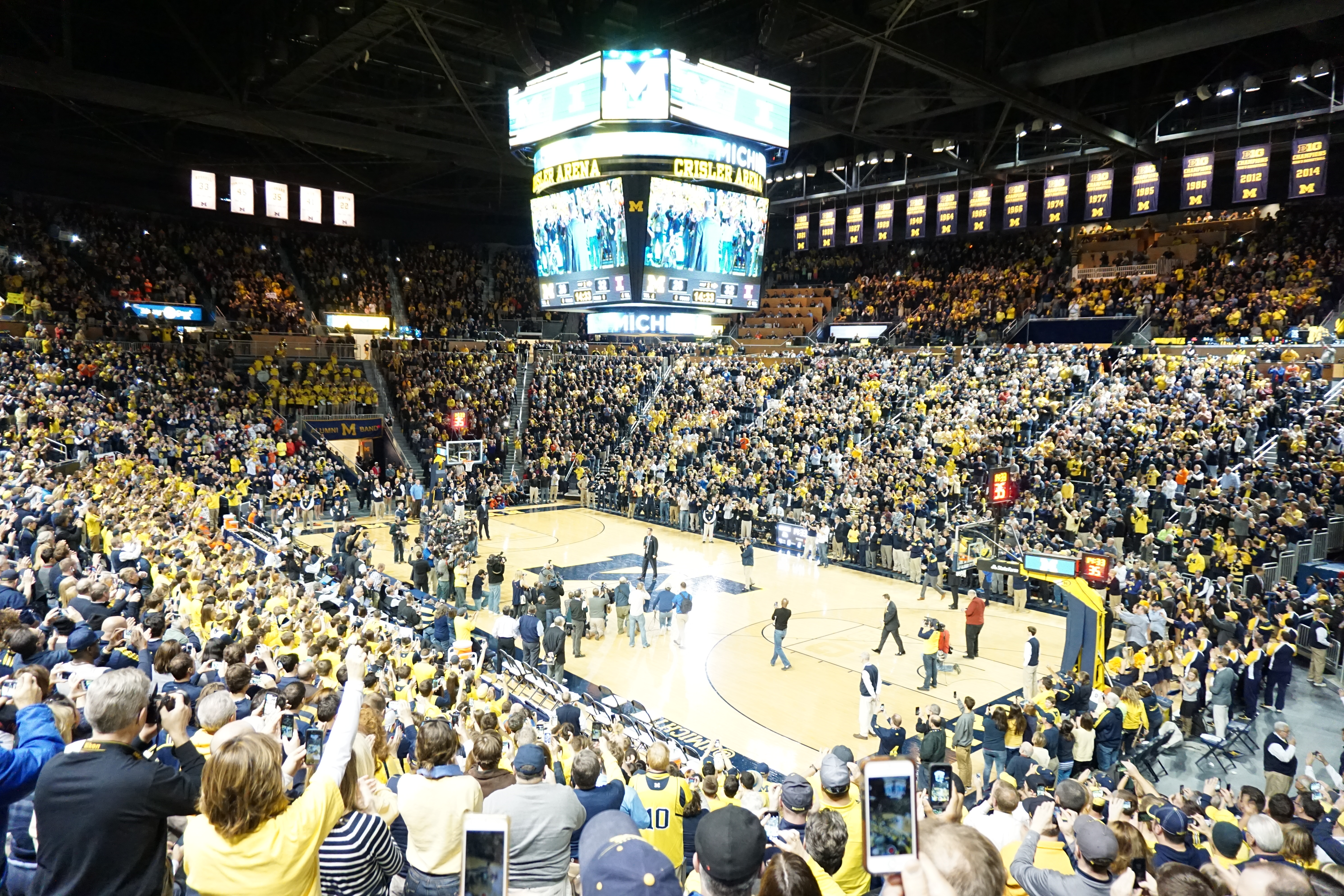
Crisler Center (Michigan)

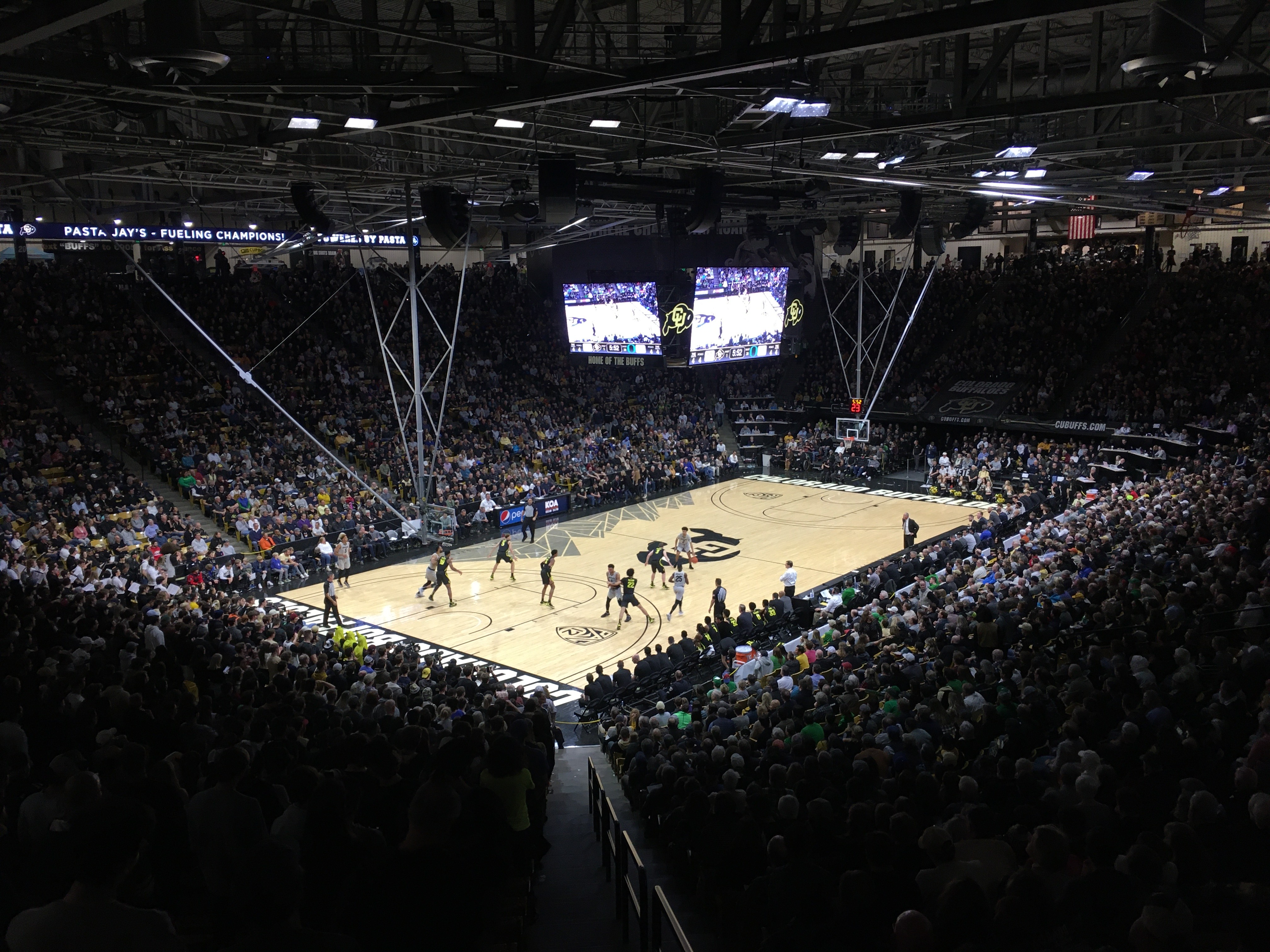
CU Events Center (Colorado)

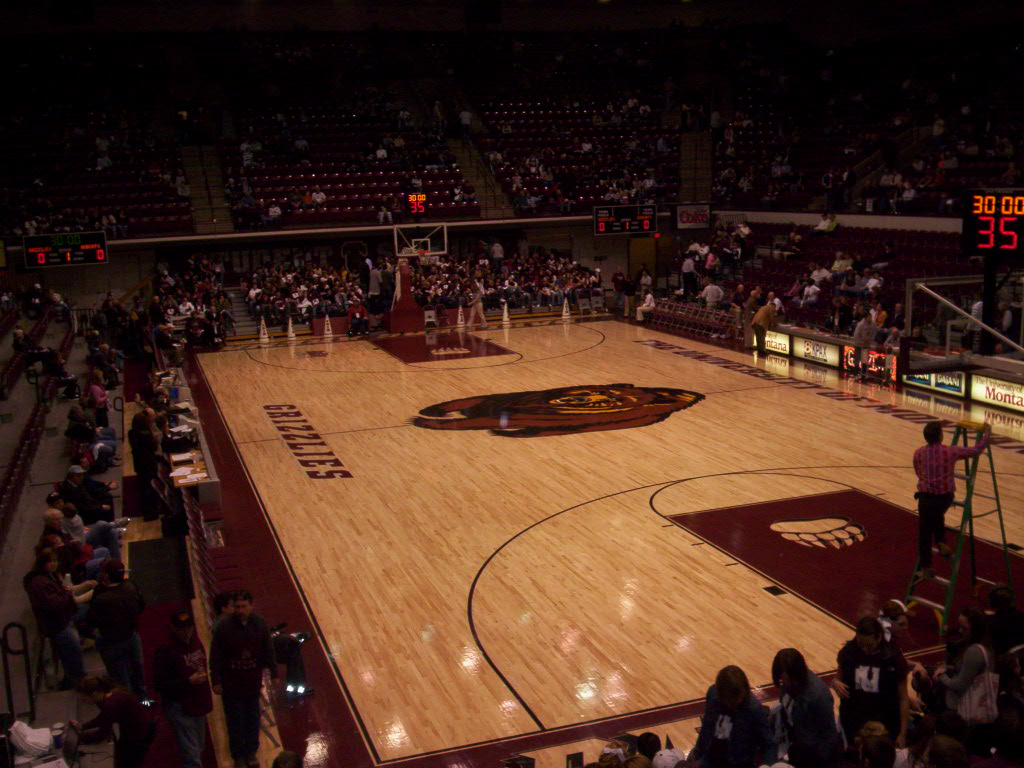
Dahlberg Arena (Montana)

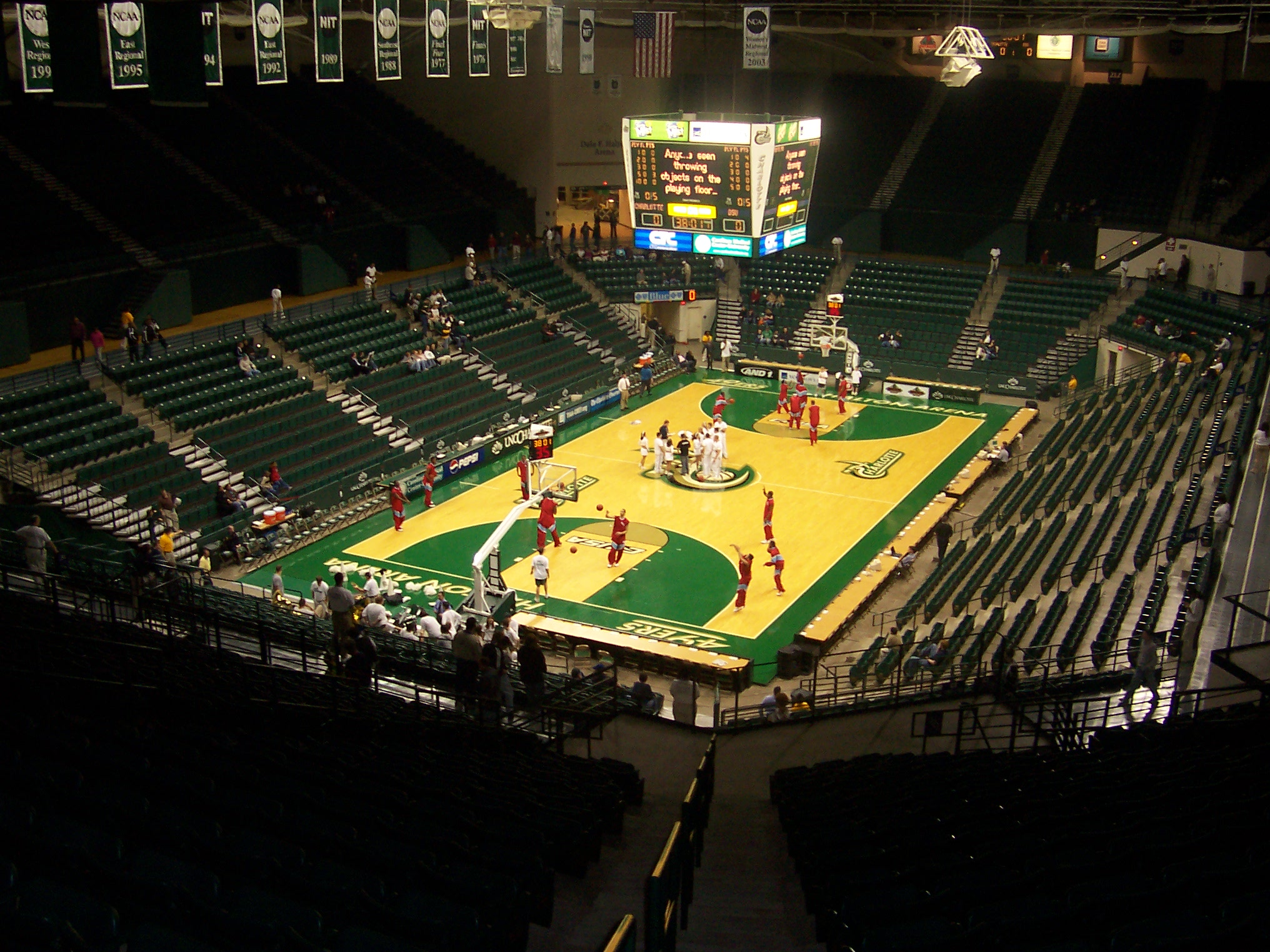
Dale F. Halton Arena (Charlotte)

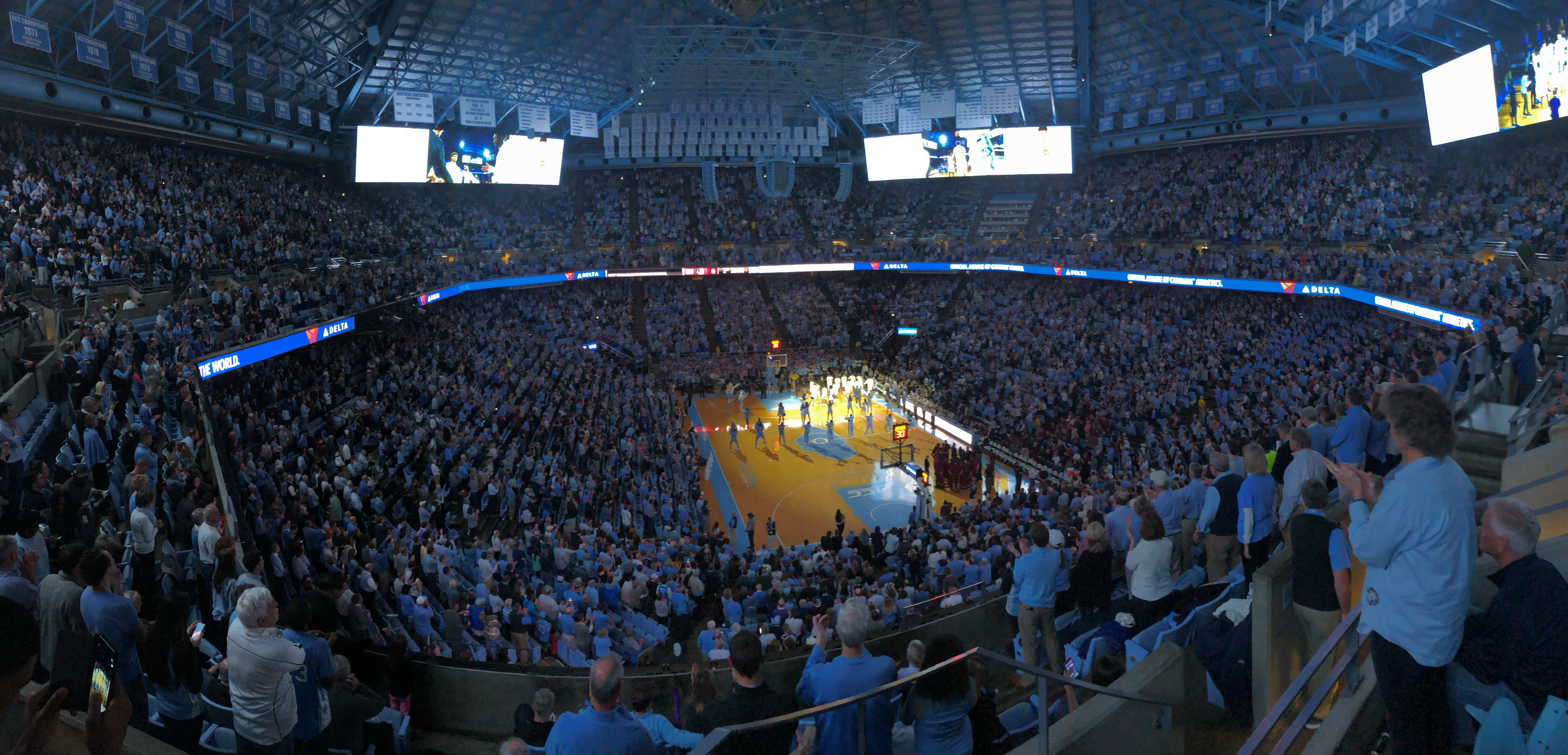
Dean Smith Center (North Carolina)

Devlin Fieldhouse (Tulane)

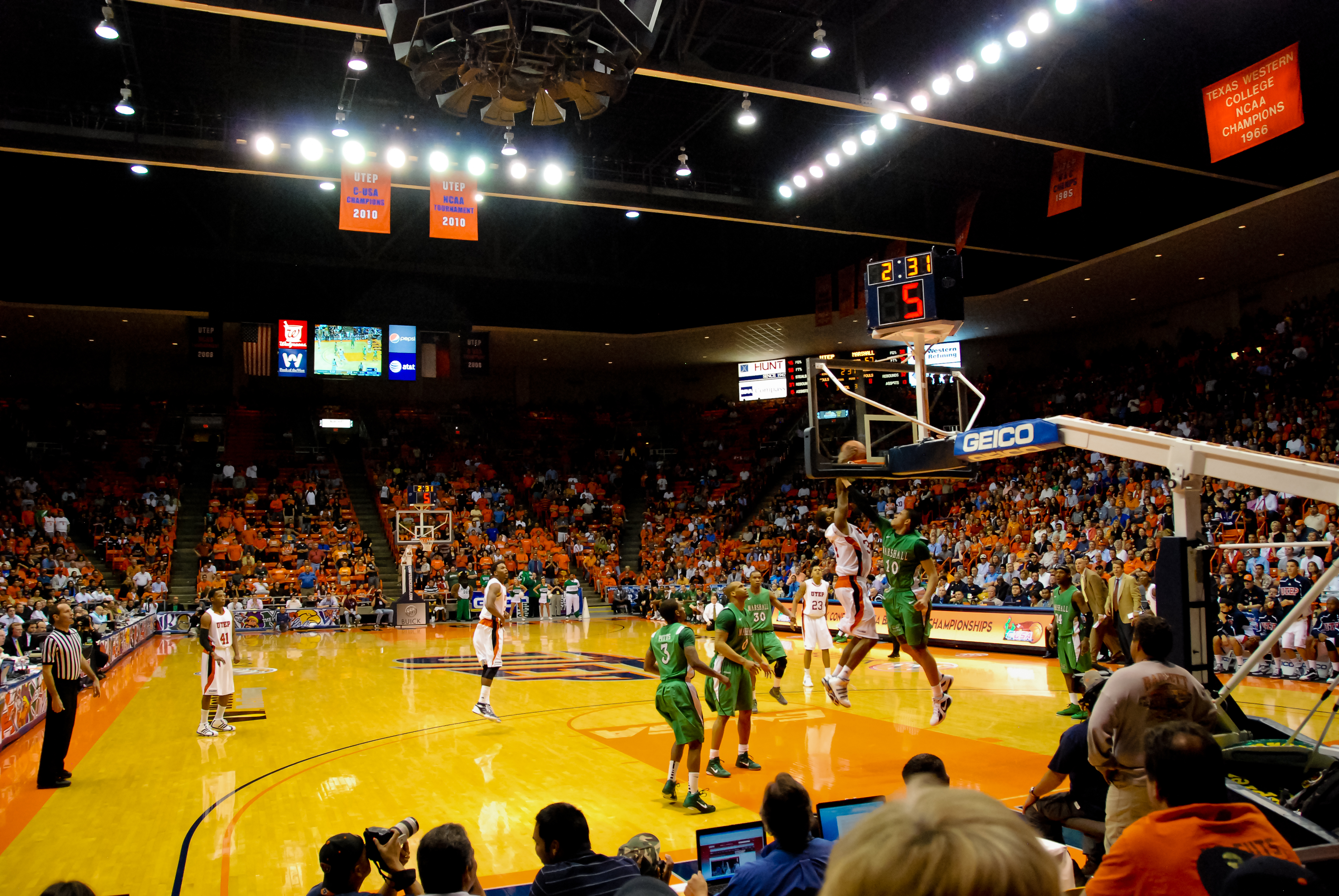
Don Haskins Center (UTEP)

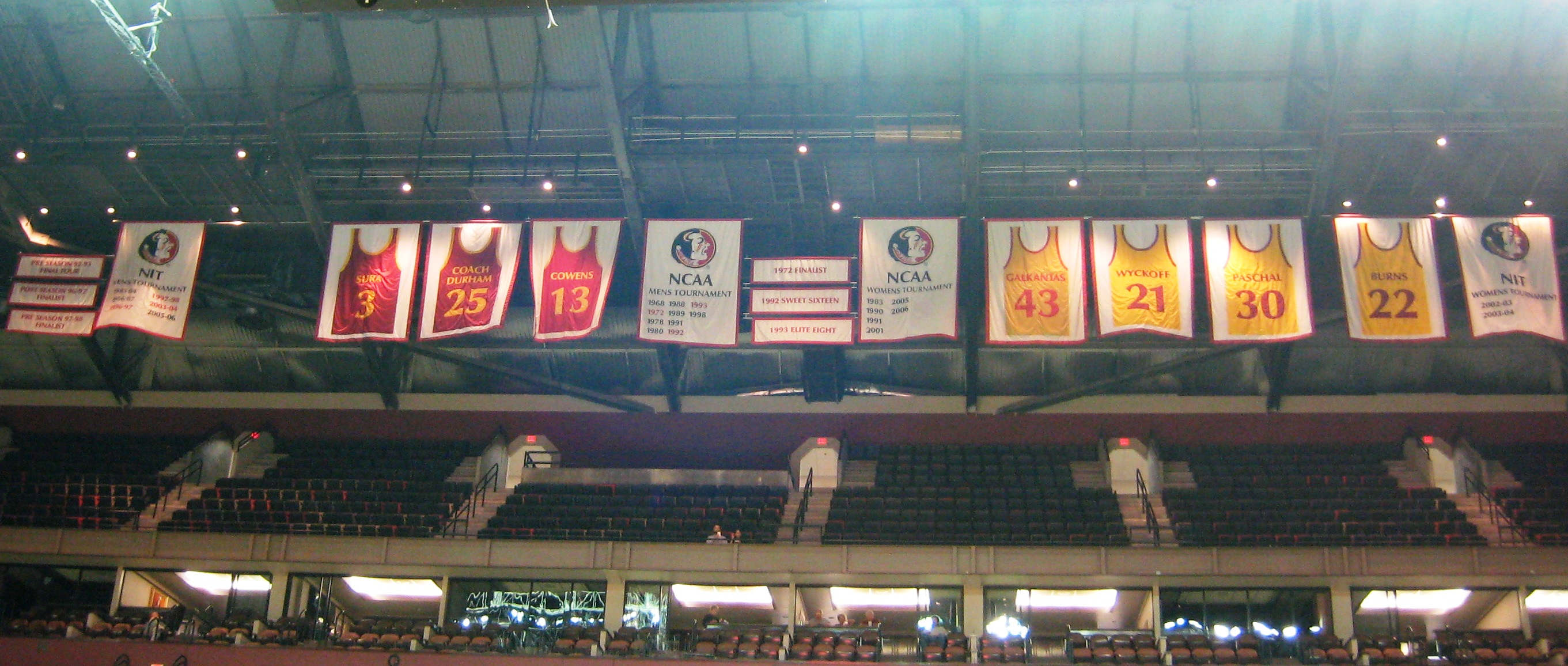
Donald L. Tucker Civic Center (Florida State)

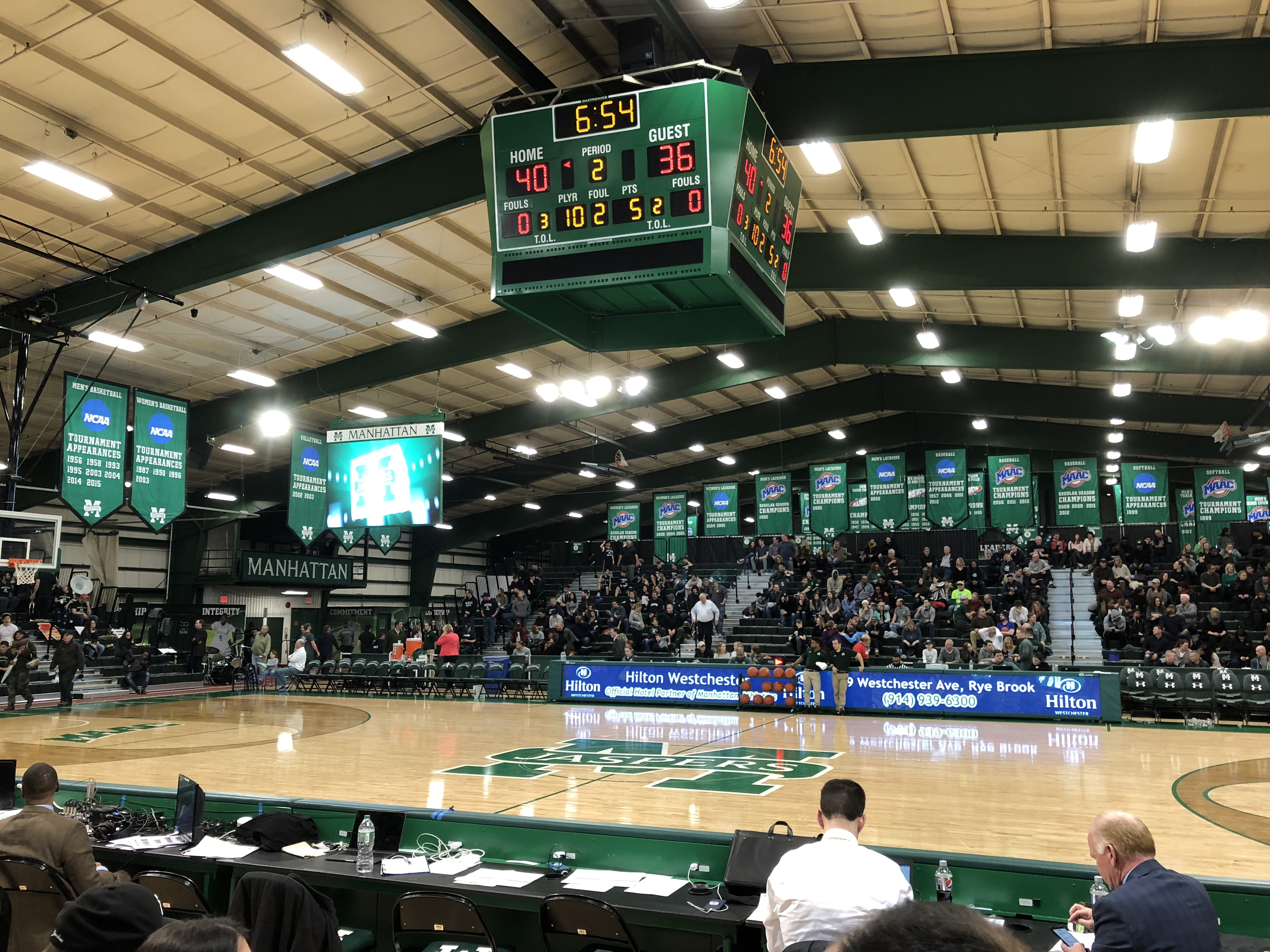
Draddy Gymnasium (Manhattan)

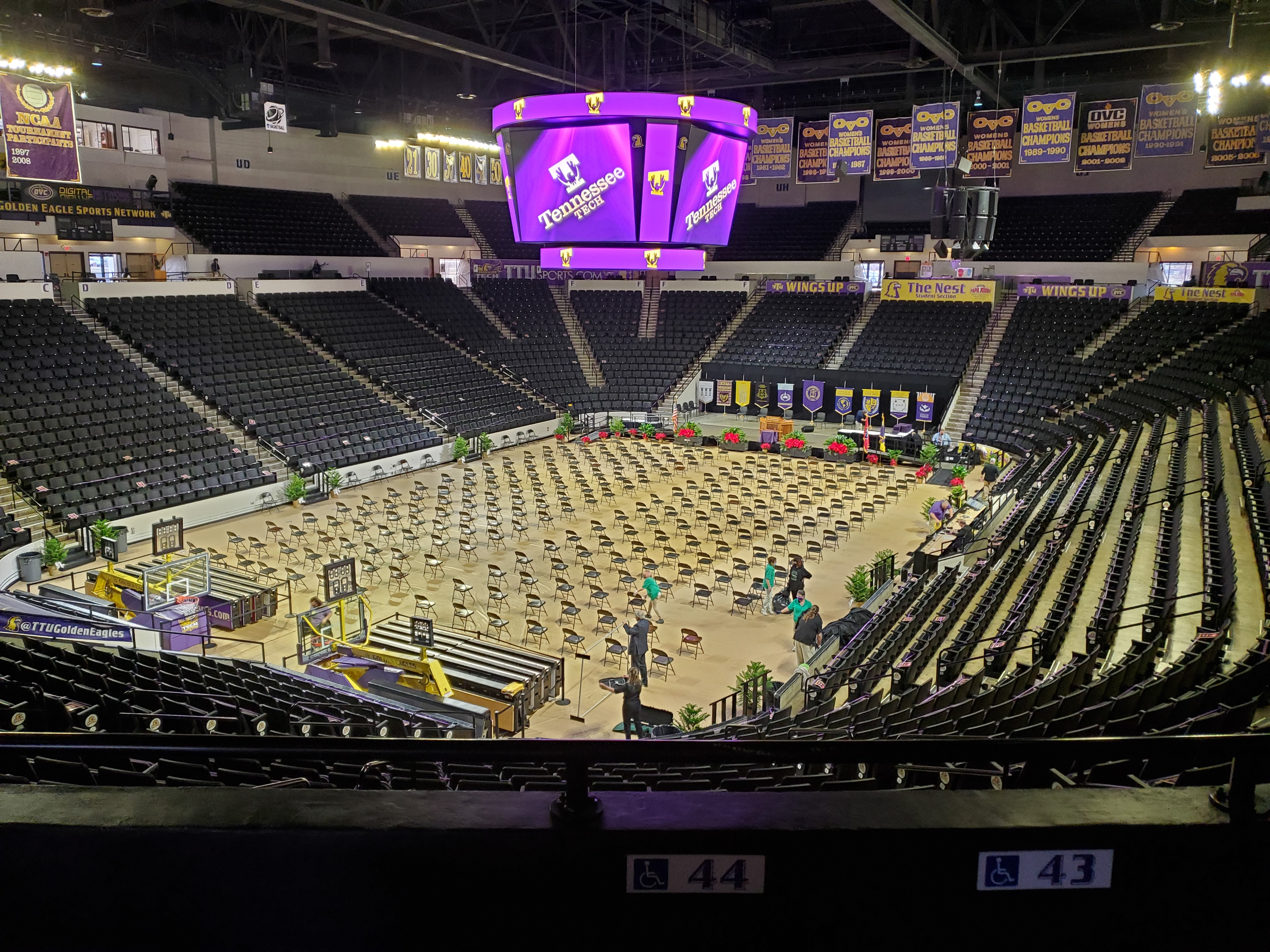
Eblen Center (Tennessee Tech)

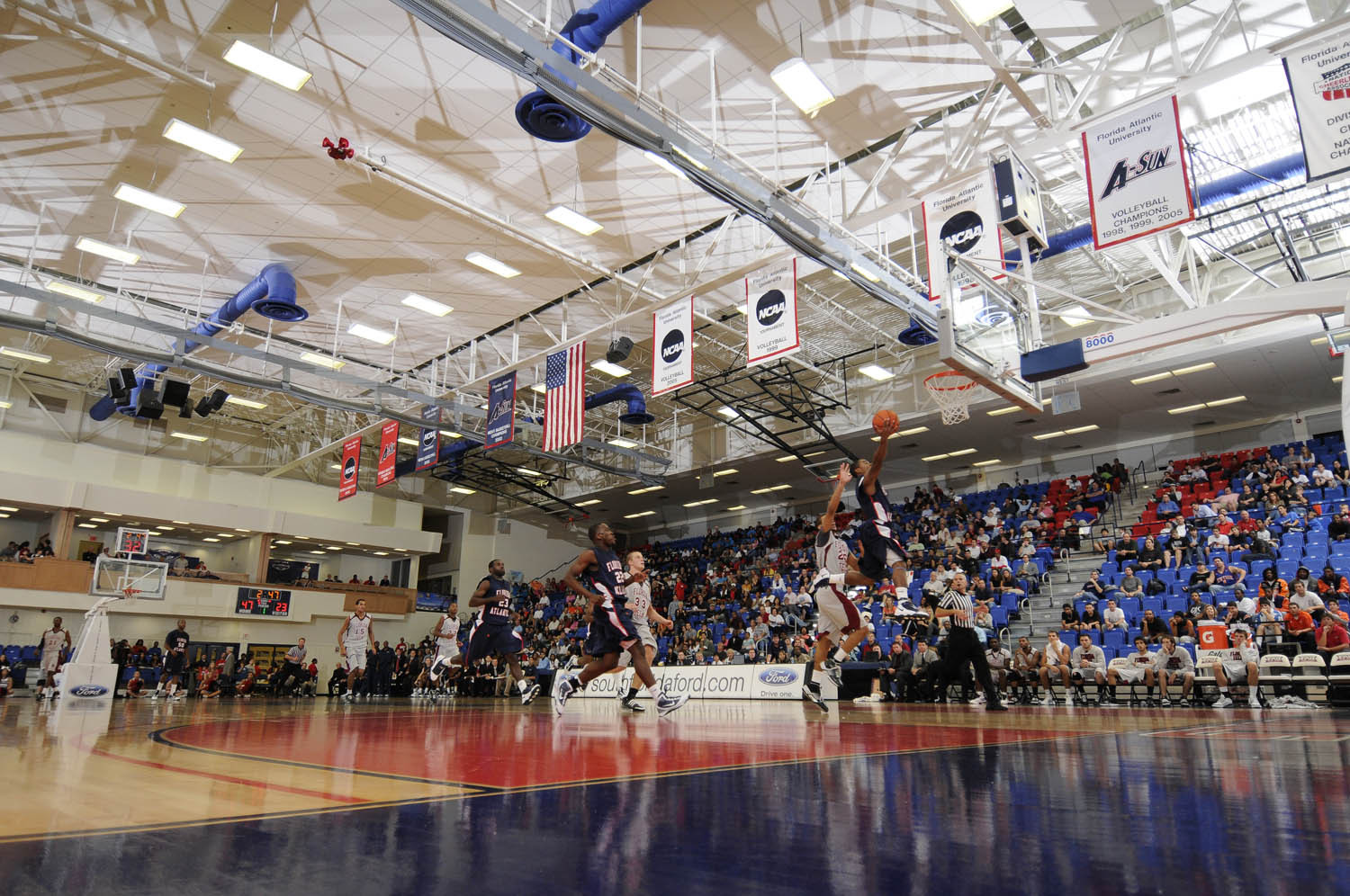
Eleanor R. Baldwin Arena (Florida Atlantic)

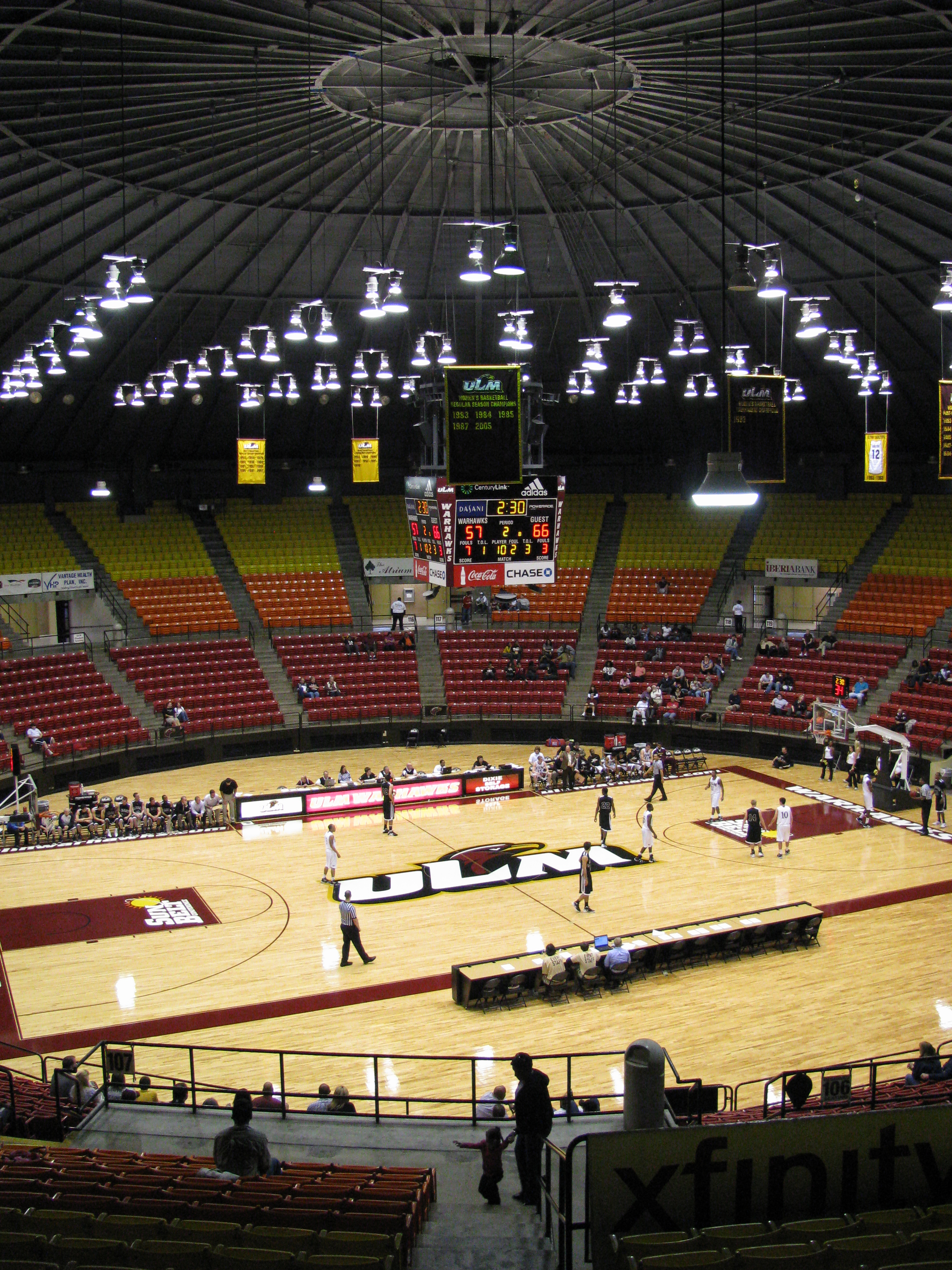
Fant–Ewing Coliseum (Louisiana–Monroe)

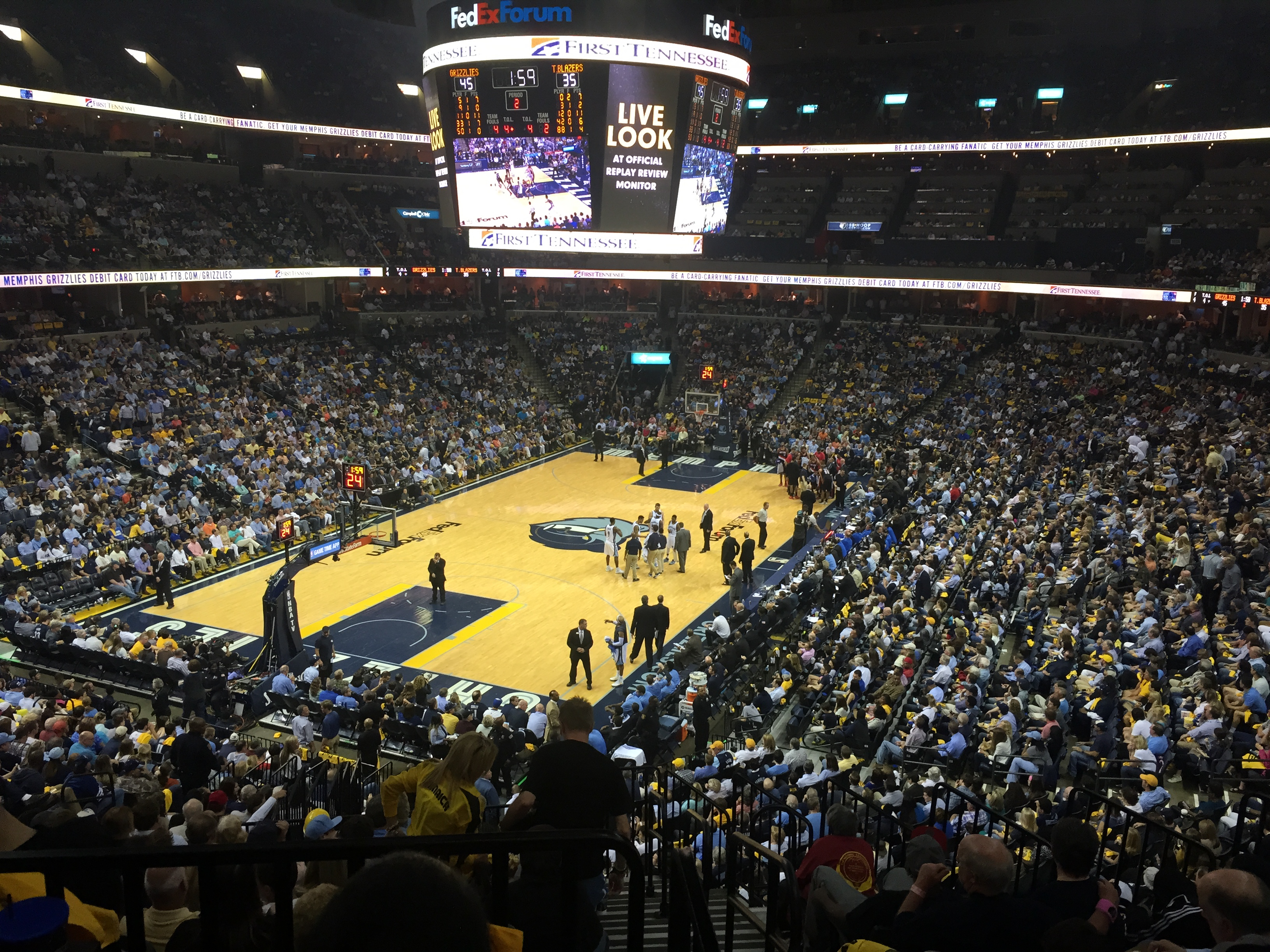
FedExForum (Memphis)

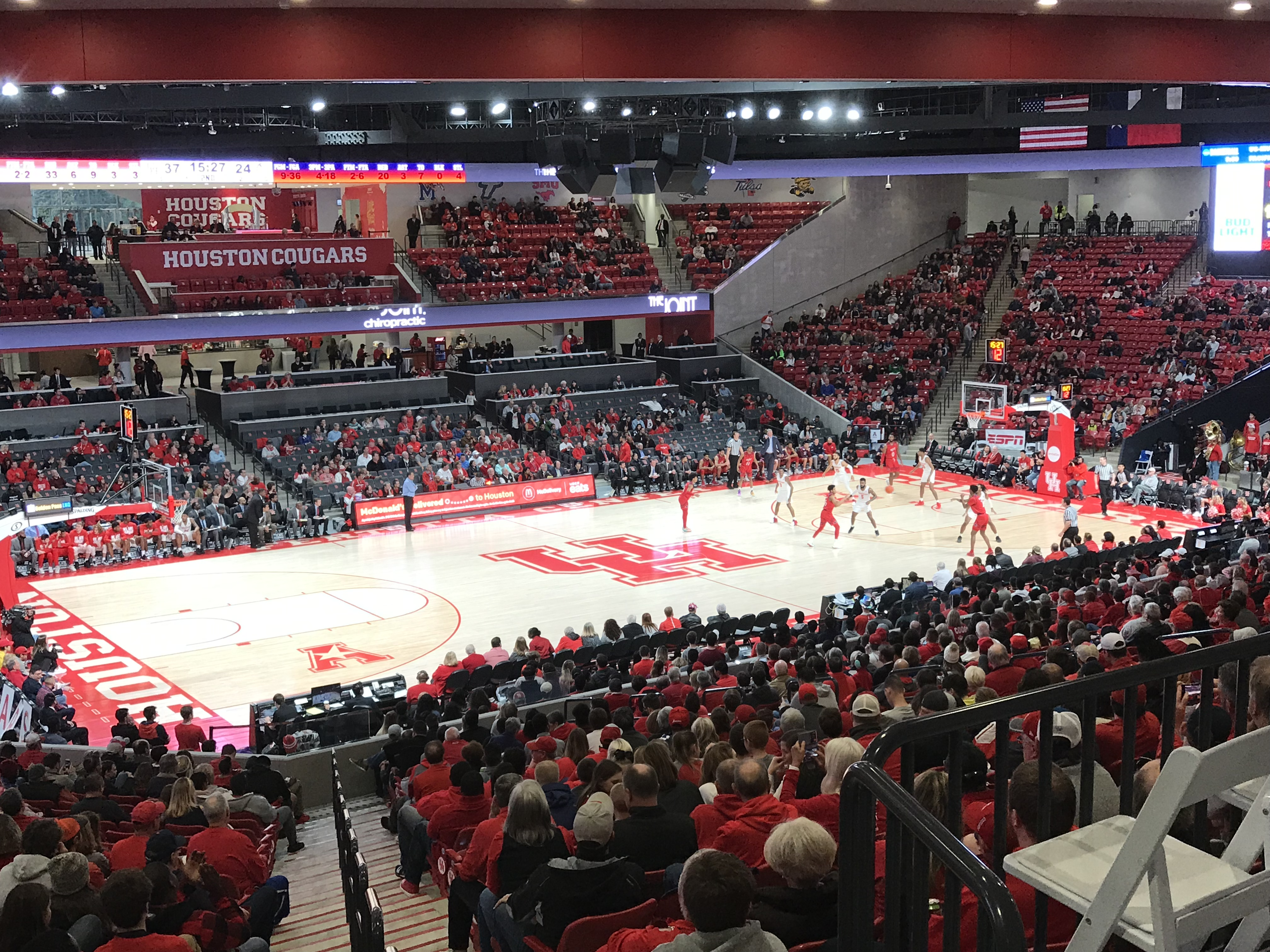
Fertitta Center (Houston)

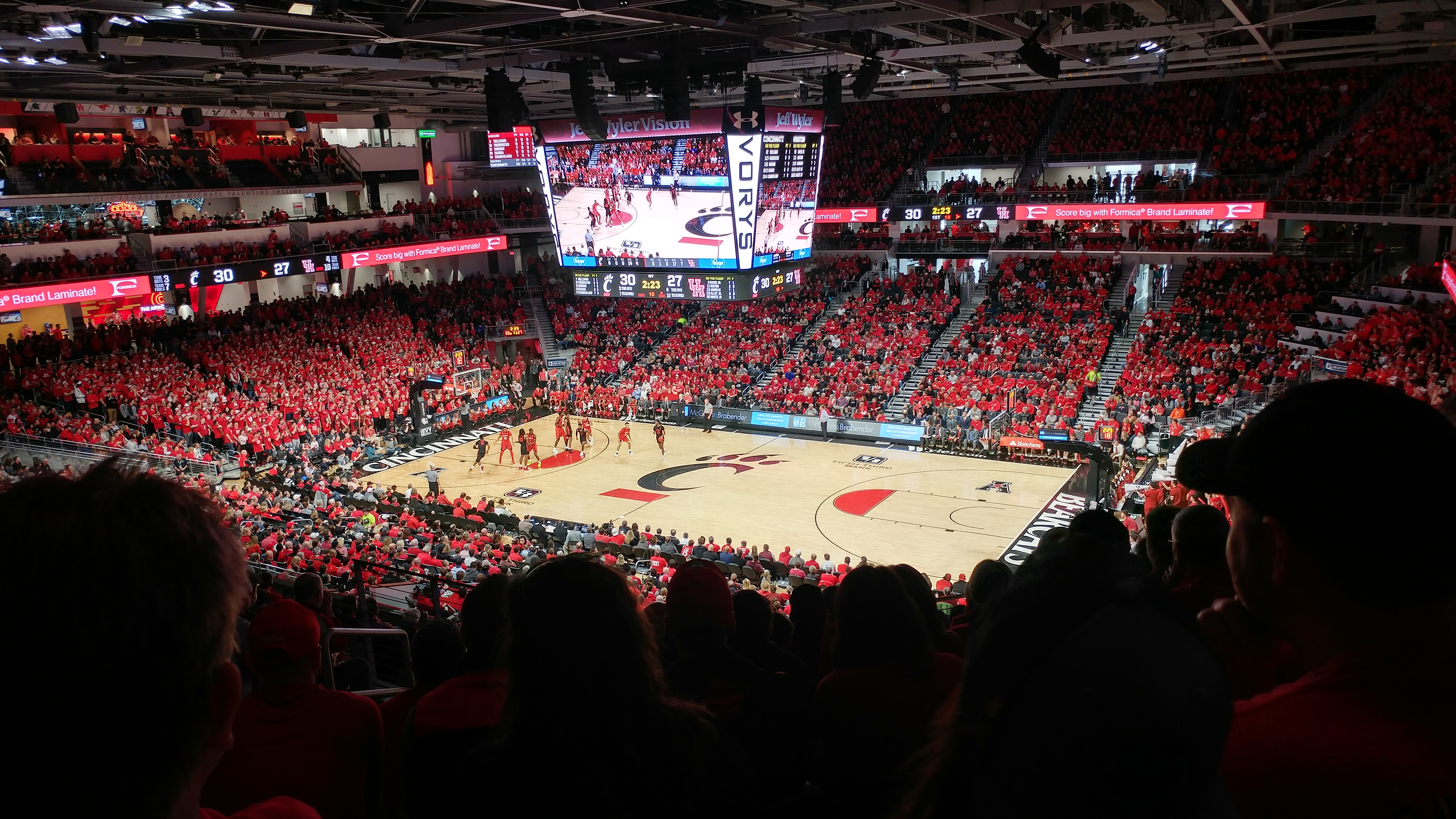
Fifth Third Arena (Cincinnati)

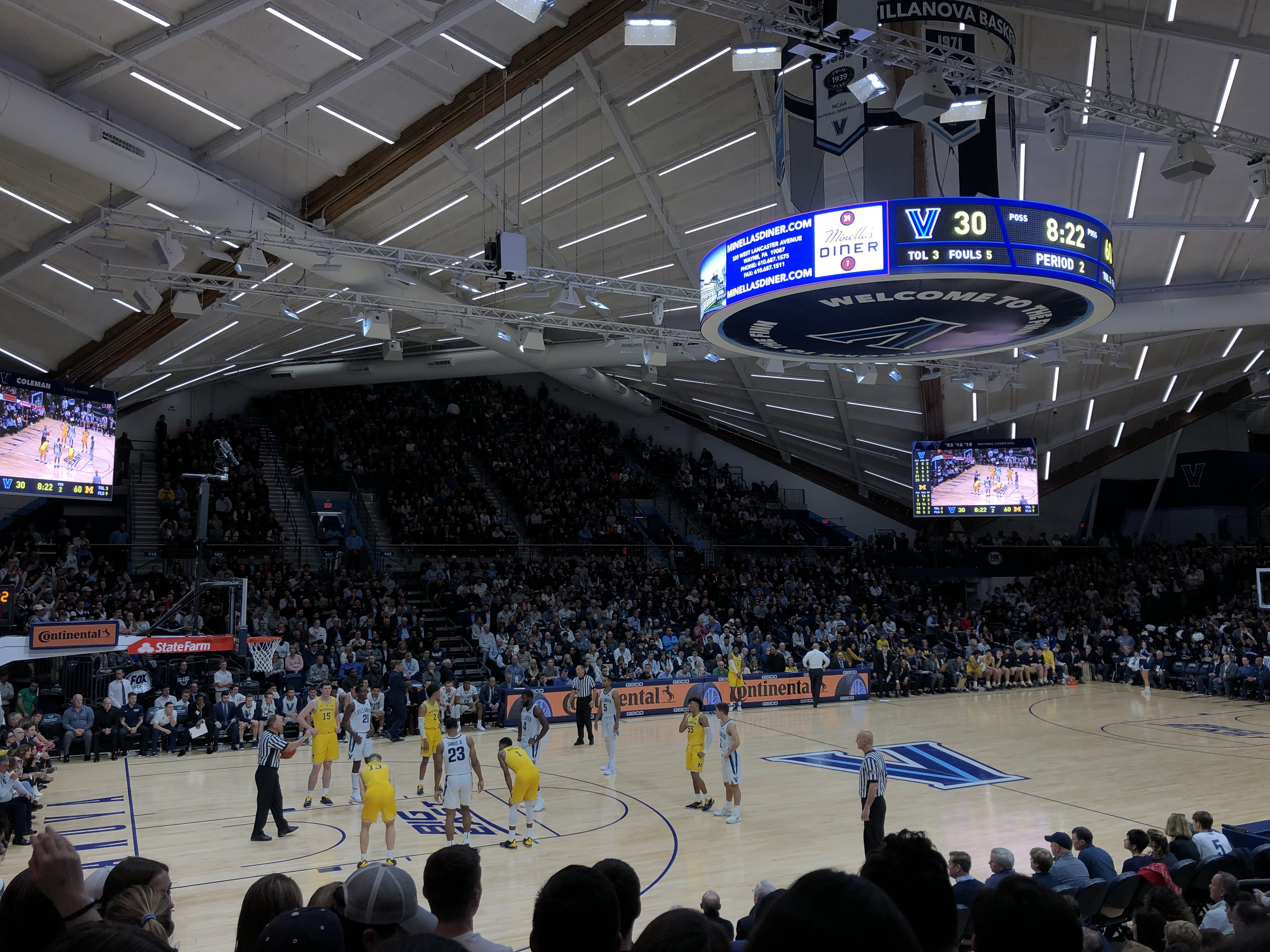
Finneran Pavilion (Villanova)

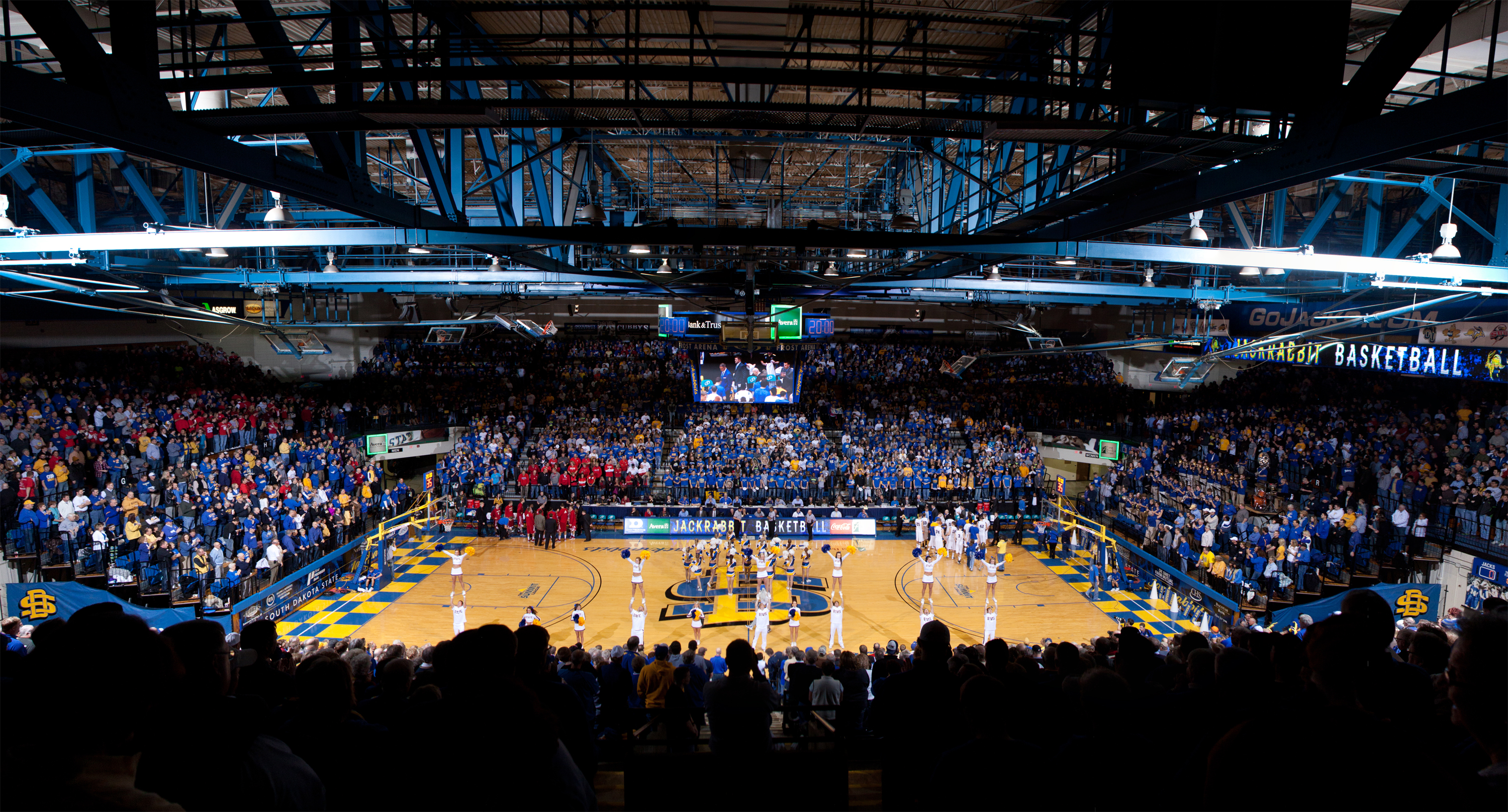
First Bank and Trust Arena (South Dakota State)

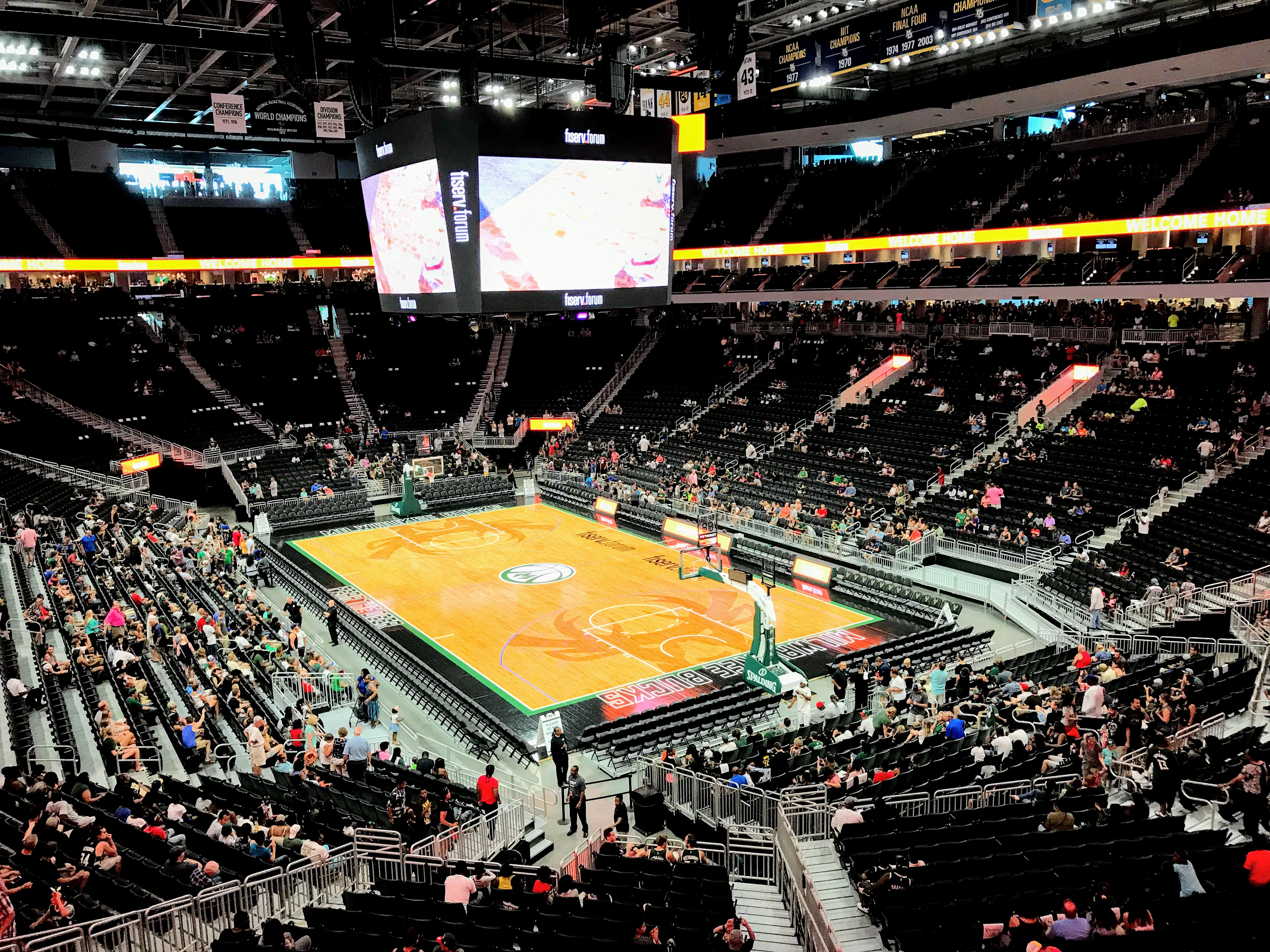
Fiserv Forum (Marquette)

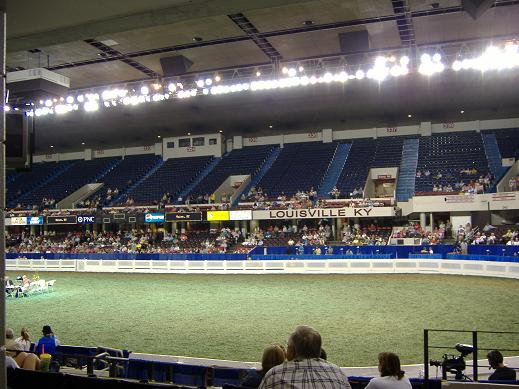
Freedom Hall (Bellarmine)

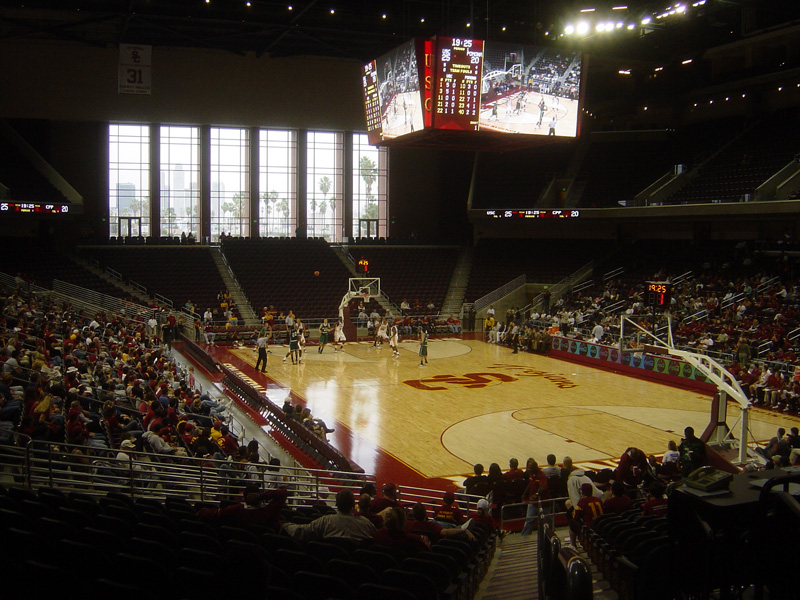
Galen Center (USC)

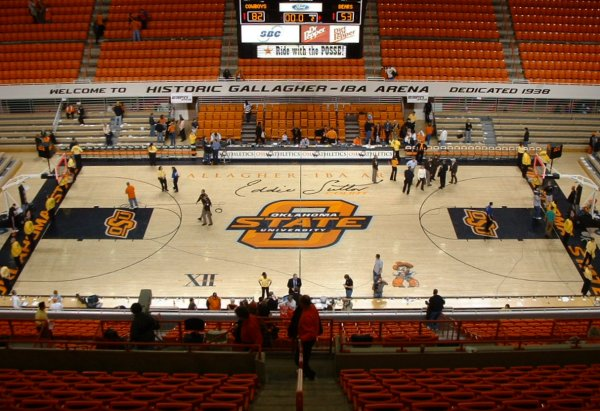
Gallagher-Iba Arena (Oklahoma State)

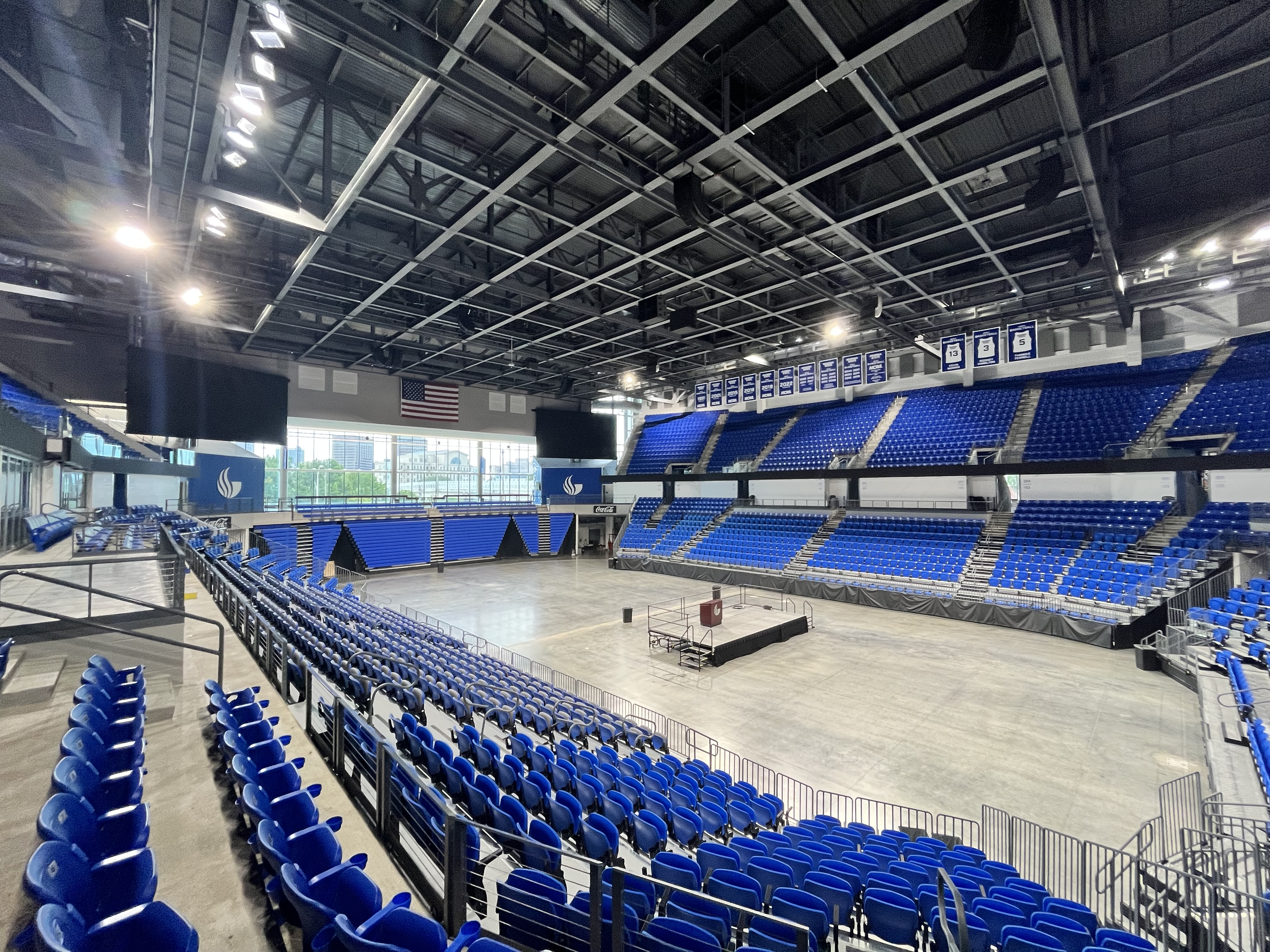
Georgia State Convocation Center (Georgia State)

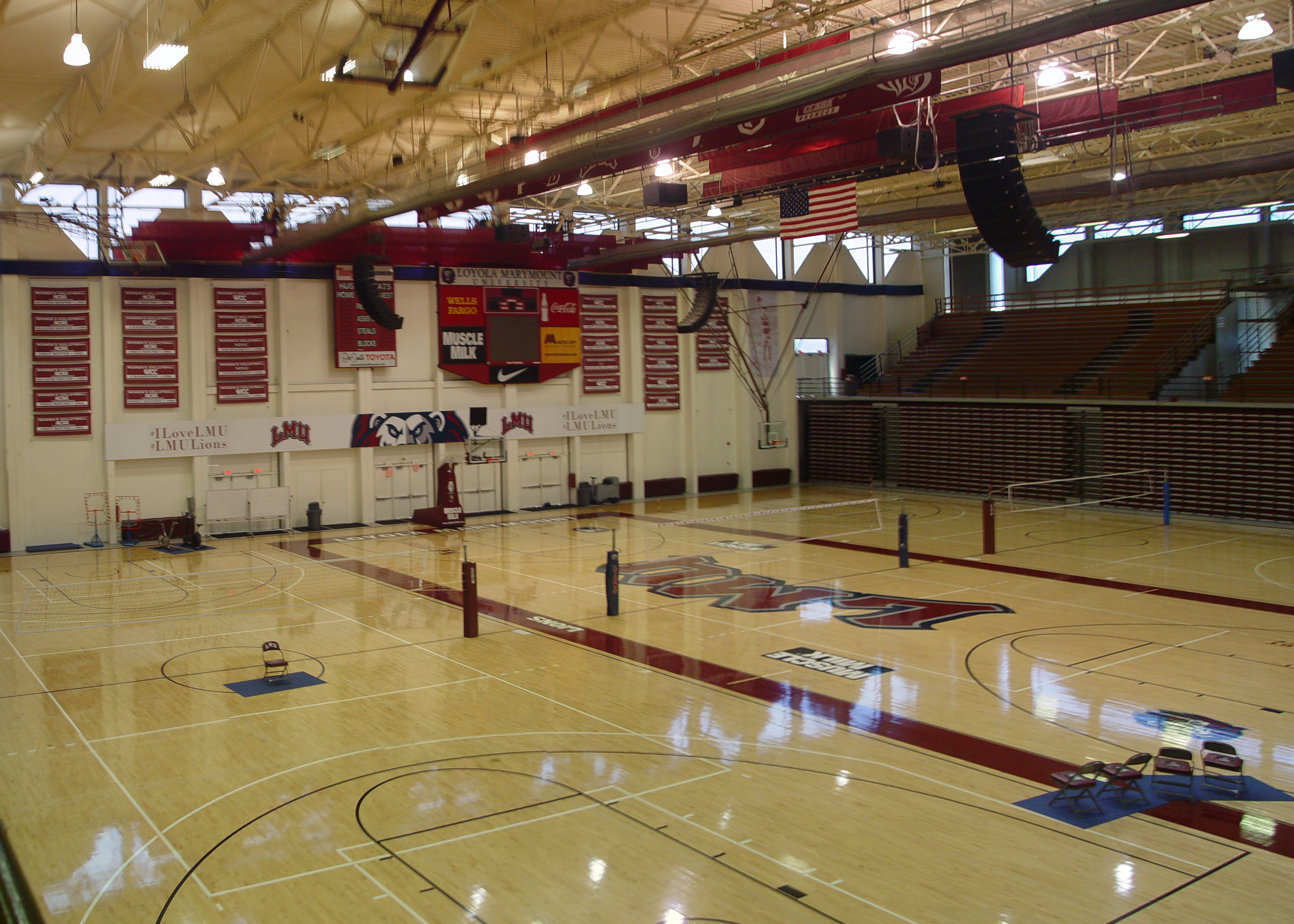
Gersten Pavilion (Loyola Marymount)

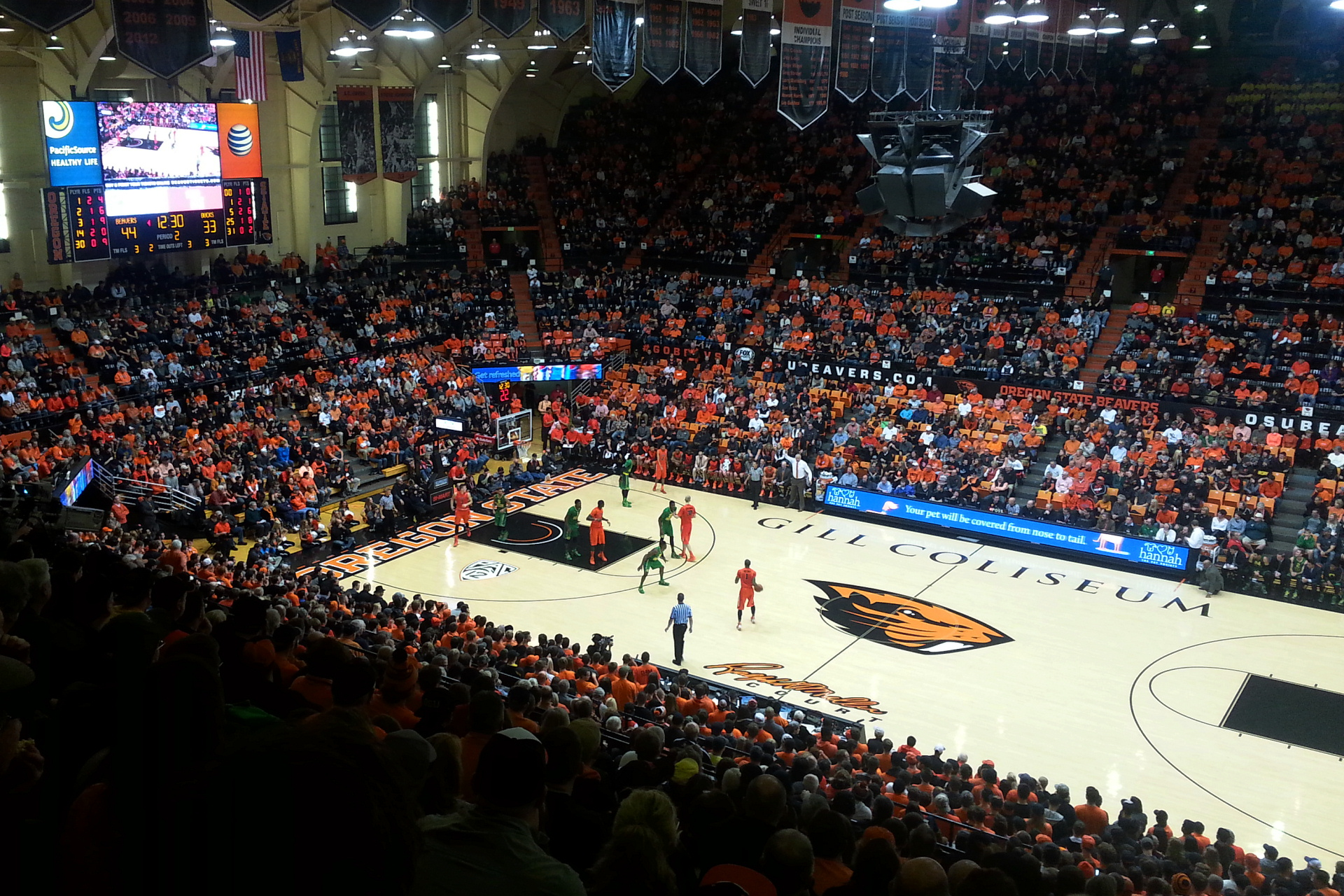
Gill Coliseum (Oregon State)

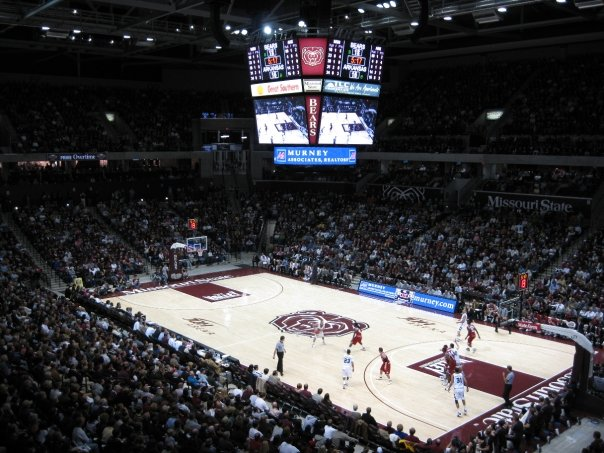
Great Southern Bank Arena (Missouri State)

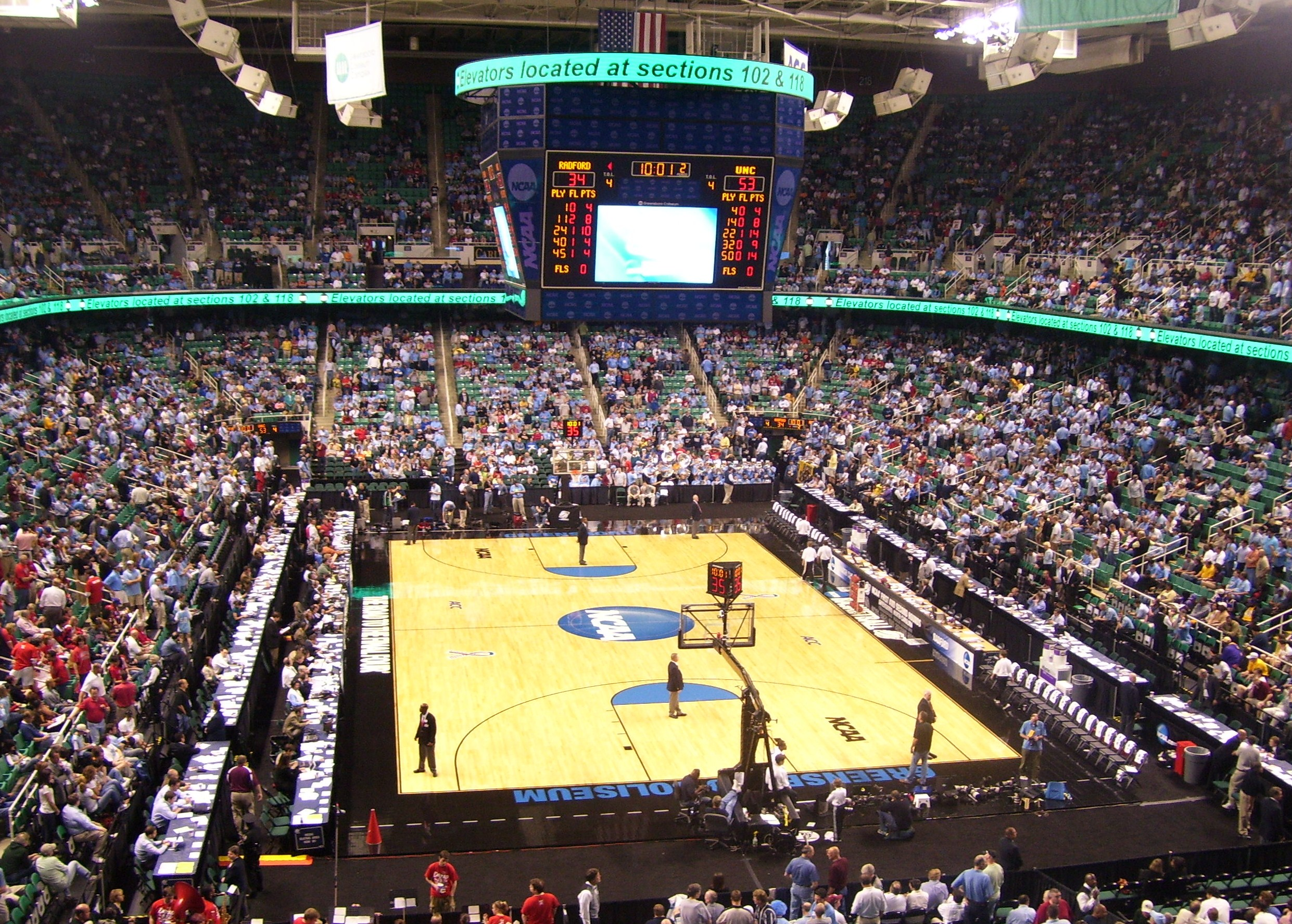
Greensboro Coliseum (UNC Greensboro)

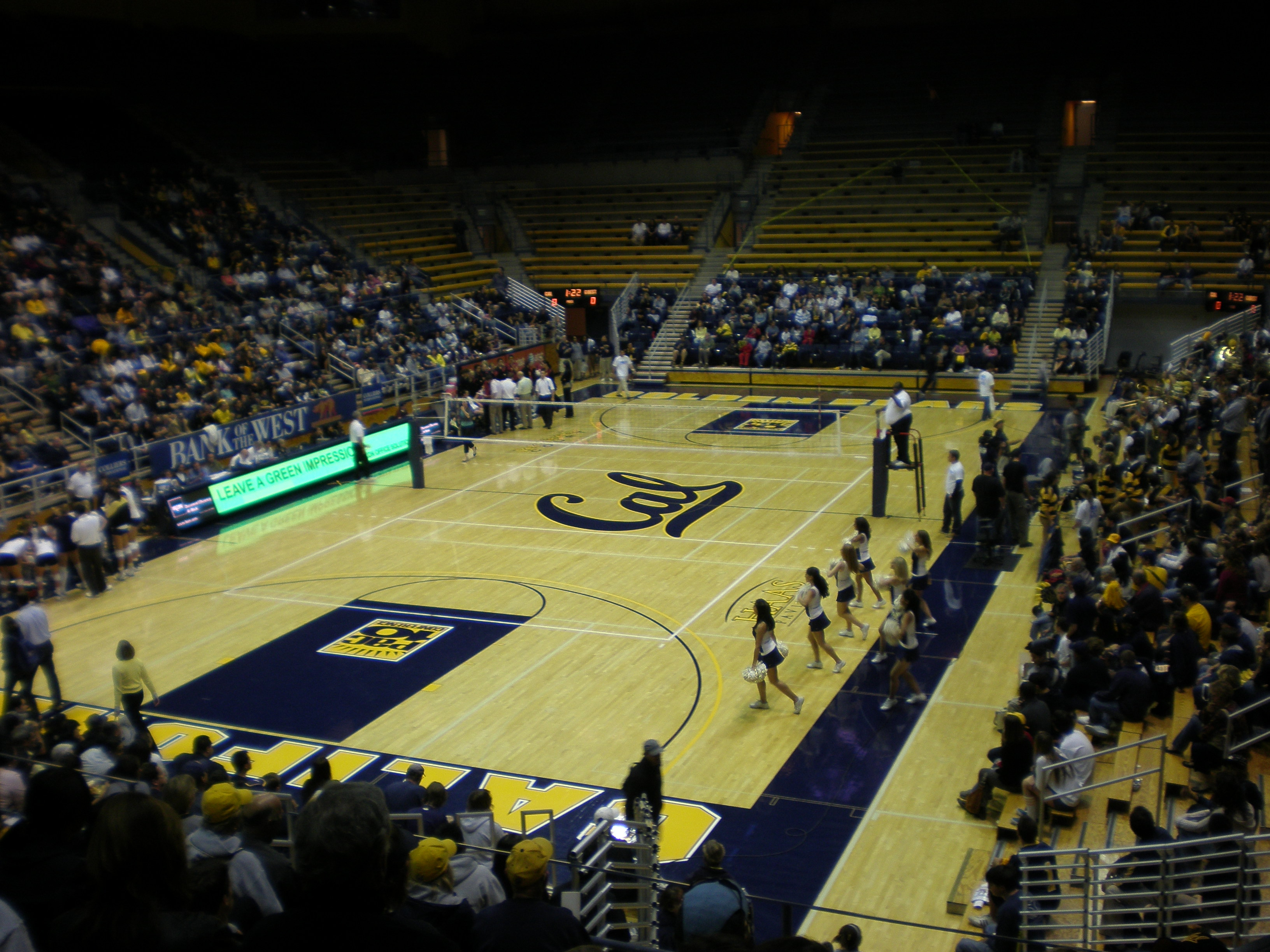
Haas Pavilion (California)

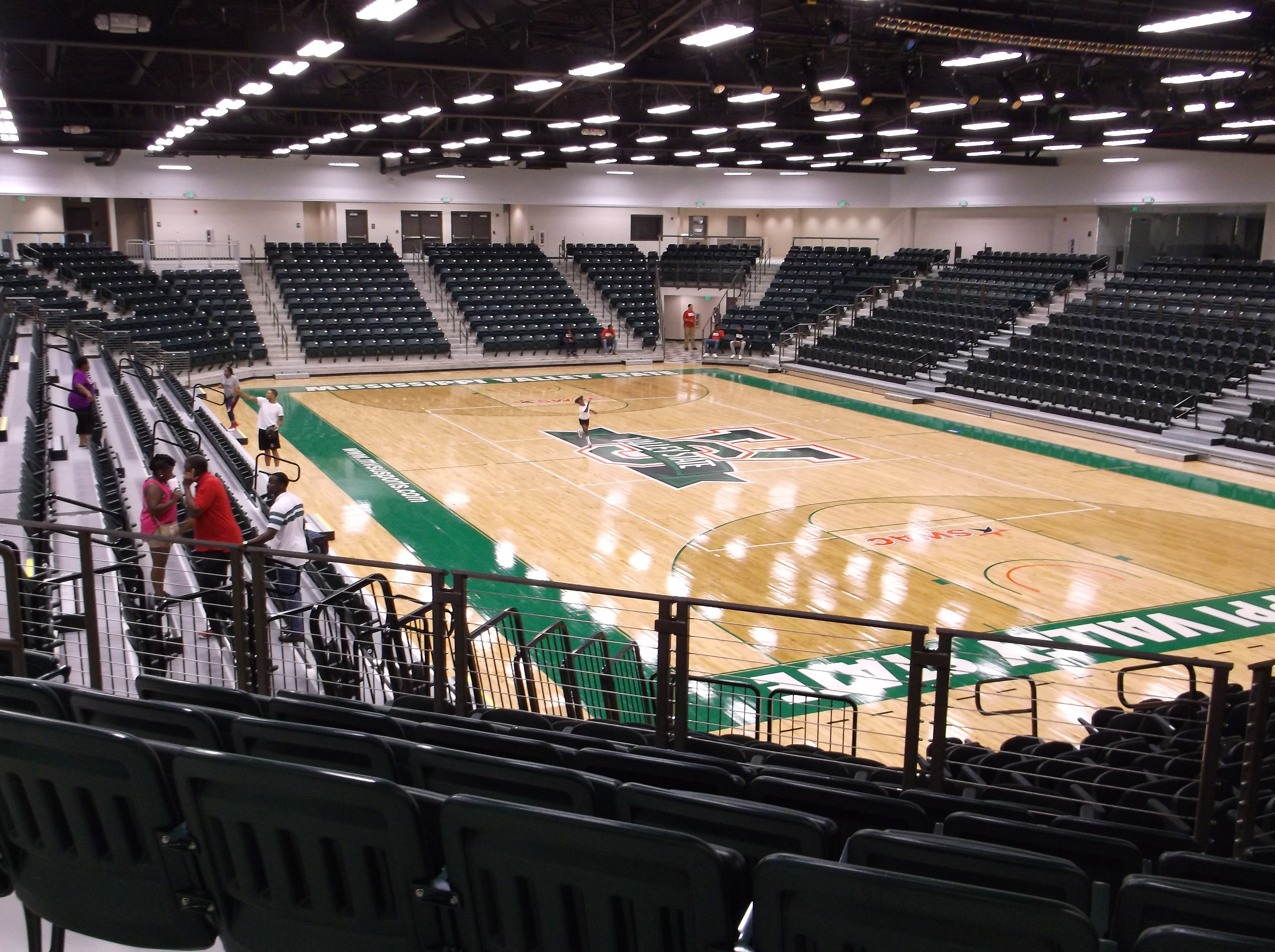
Harrison HPER Complex (Mississippi Valley State)

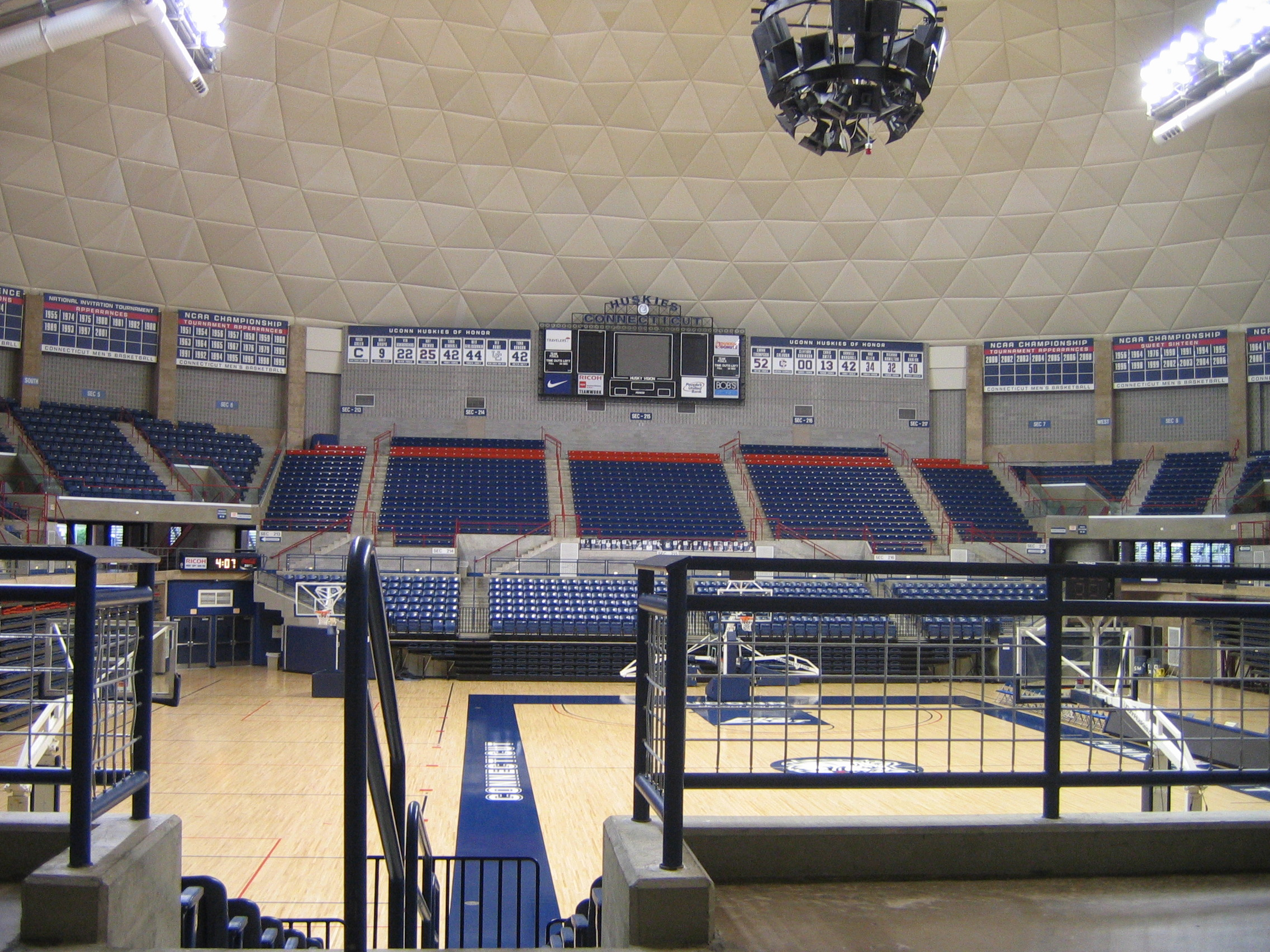
Harry A. Gampel Pavilion (UConn)

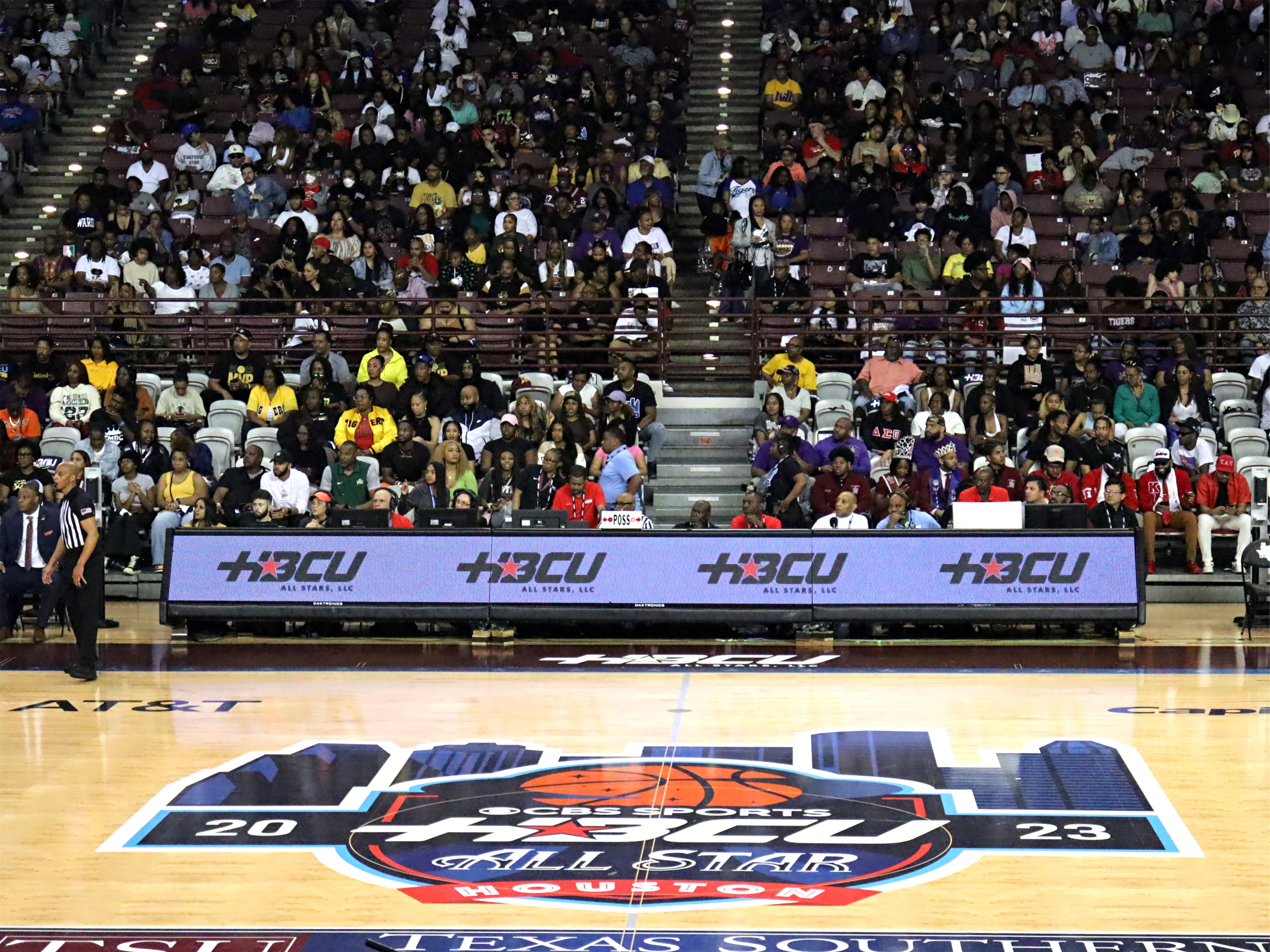
Health and Physical Education Arena (Texas Southern)

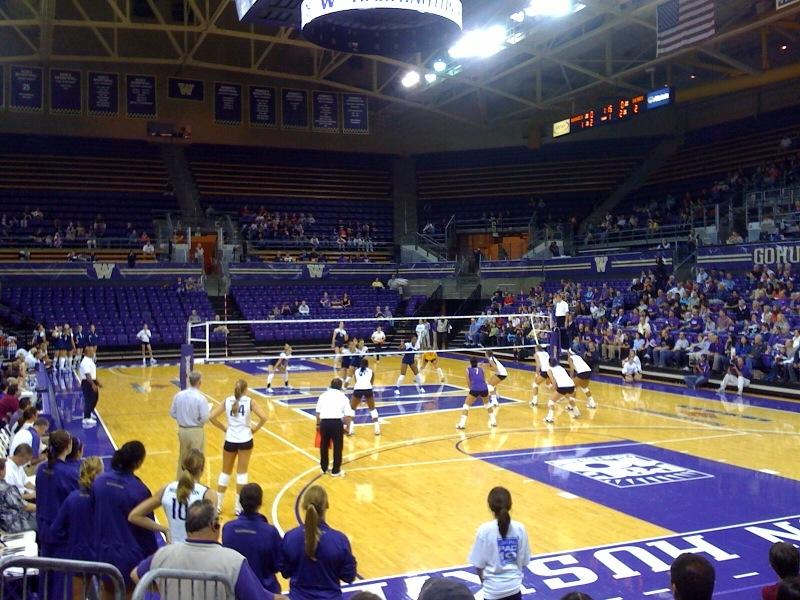
Hec Edmundson Pavilion (Washington)

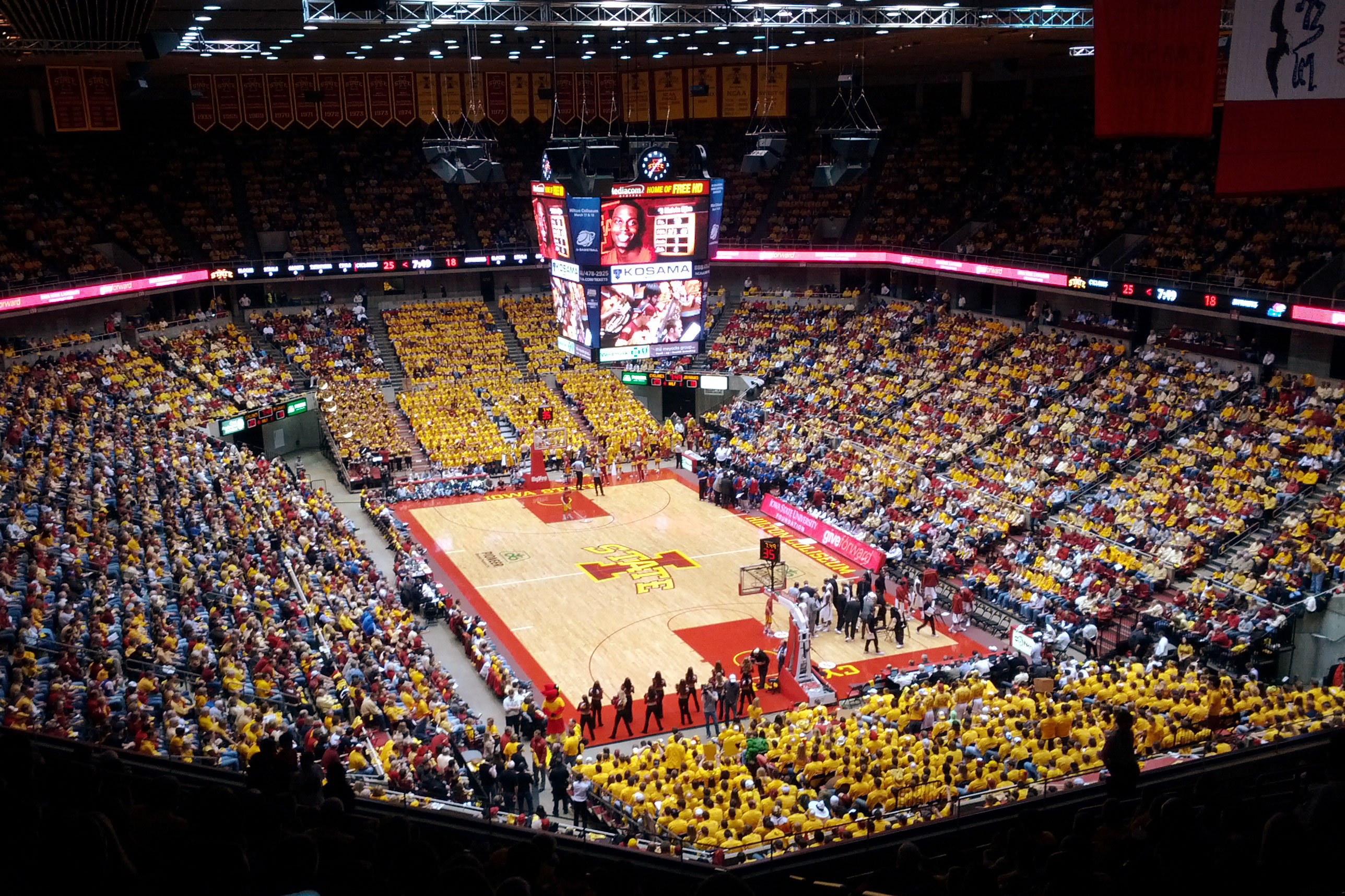
Hilton Coliseum (Iowa State)

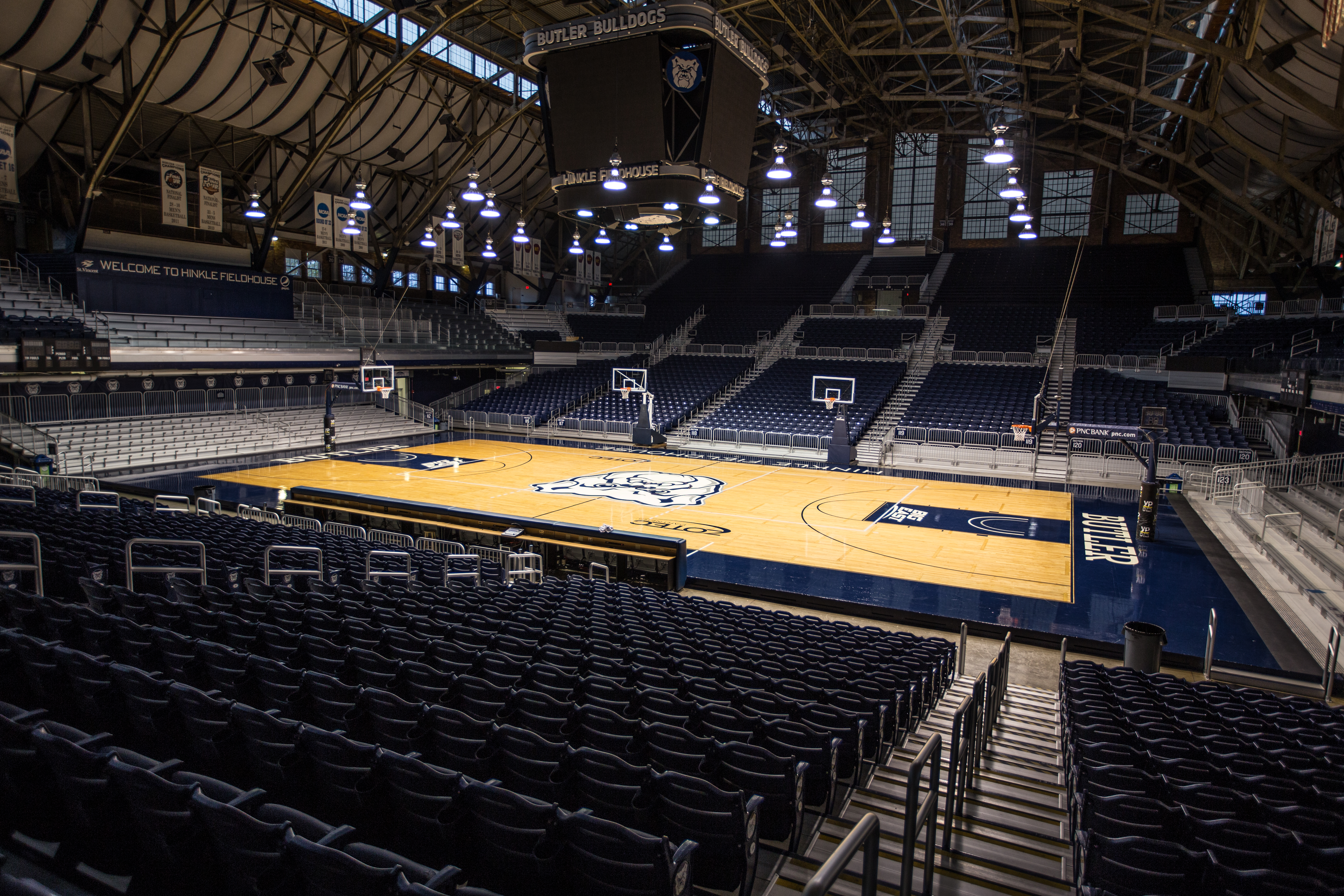
Hinkle Fieldhouse (Butler)

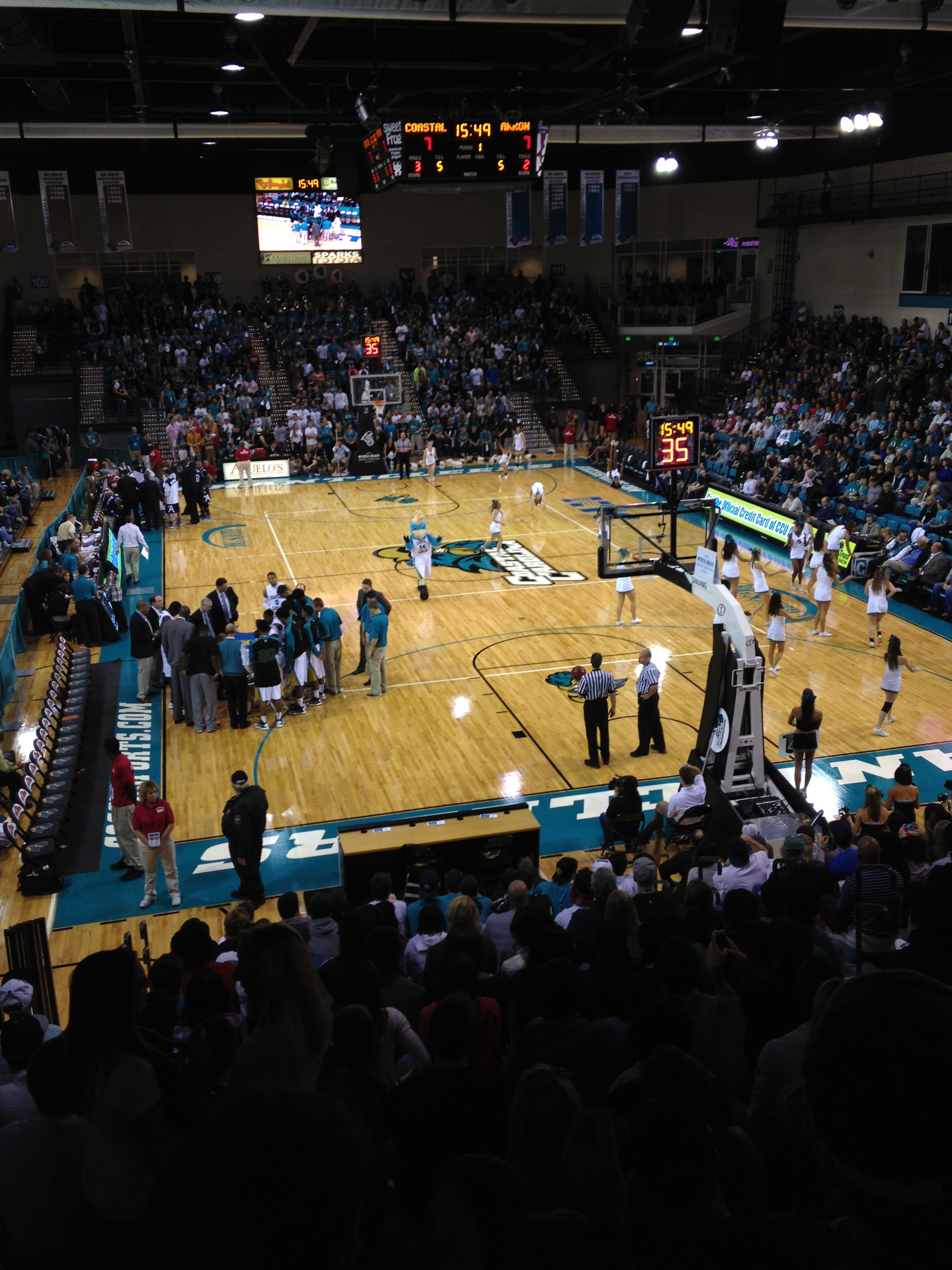
HTC Center (Coastal Carolina)

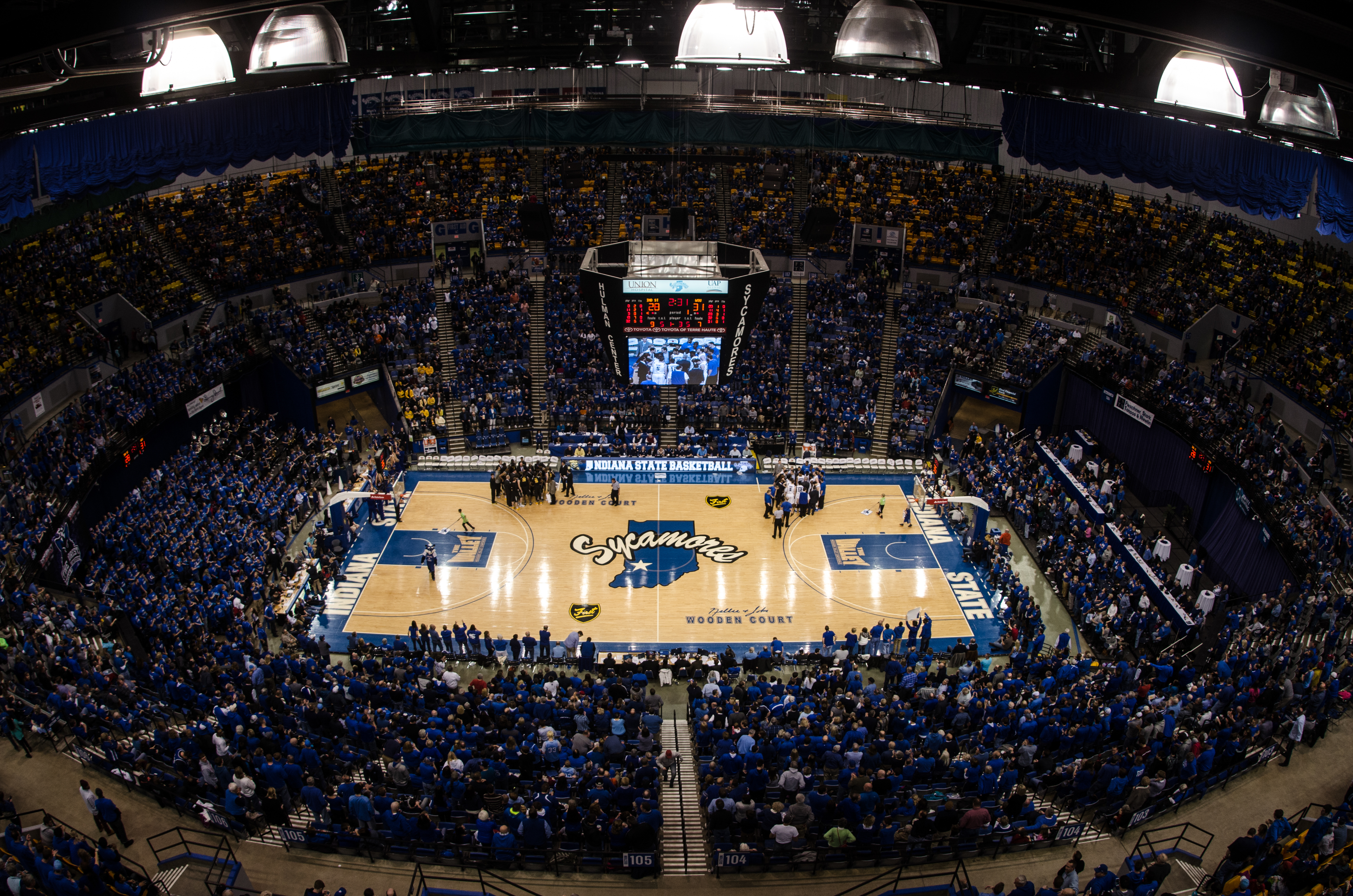
Hulman Center (Indiana State)

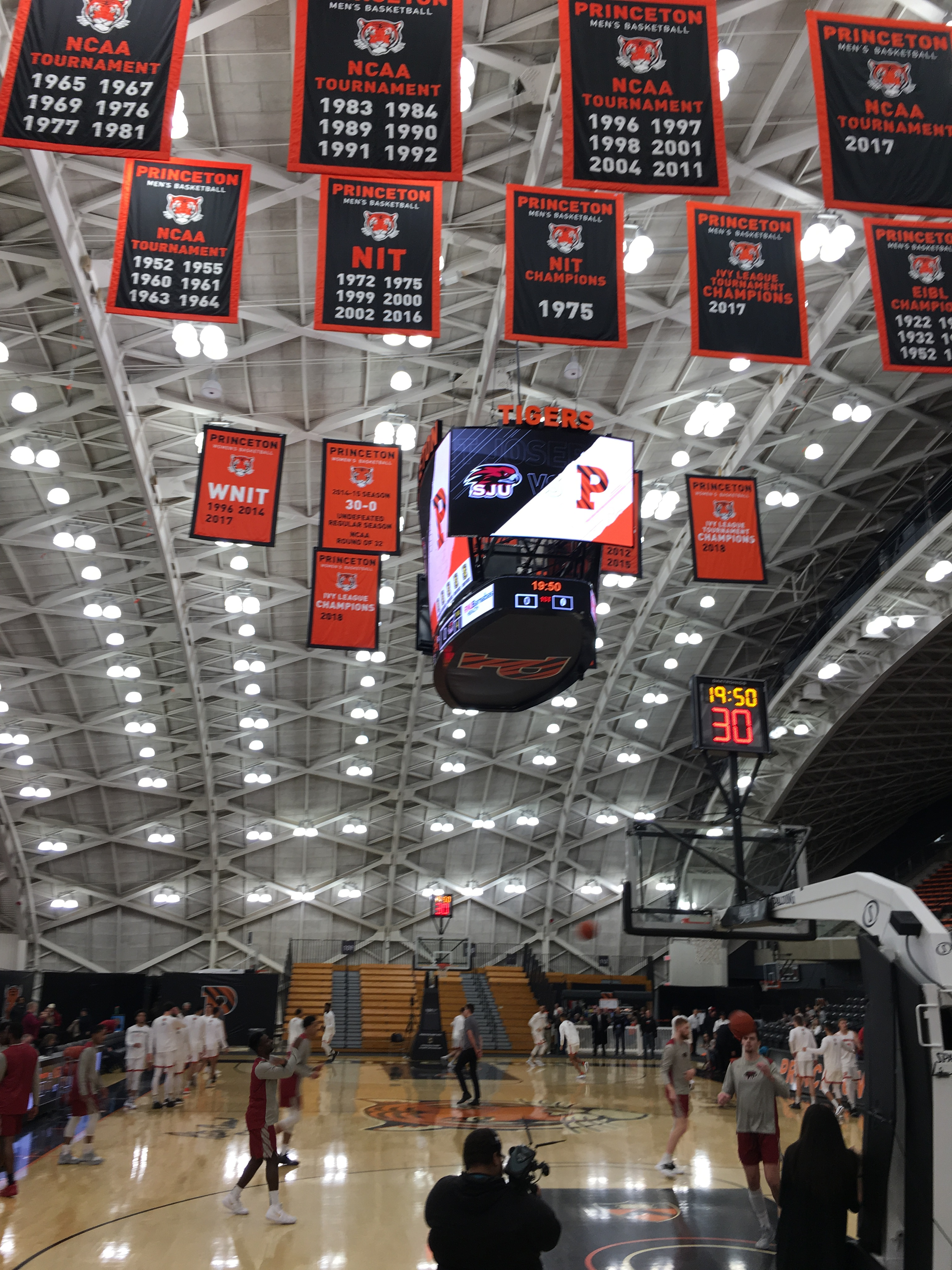
Jadwin Gymnasium (Princeton)

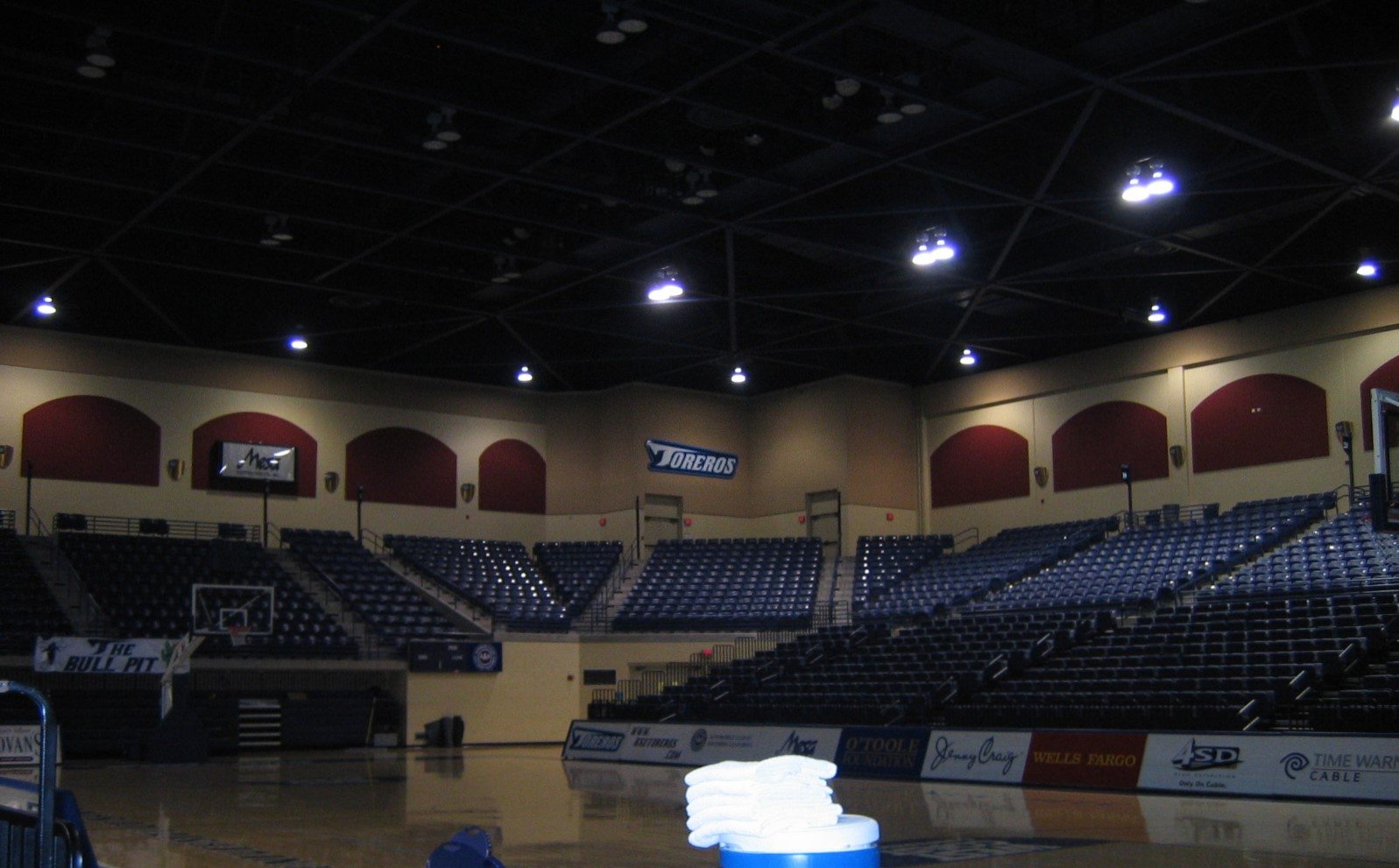
Jenny Craig Pavilion (San Diego)

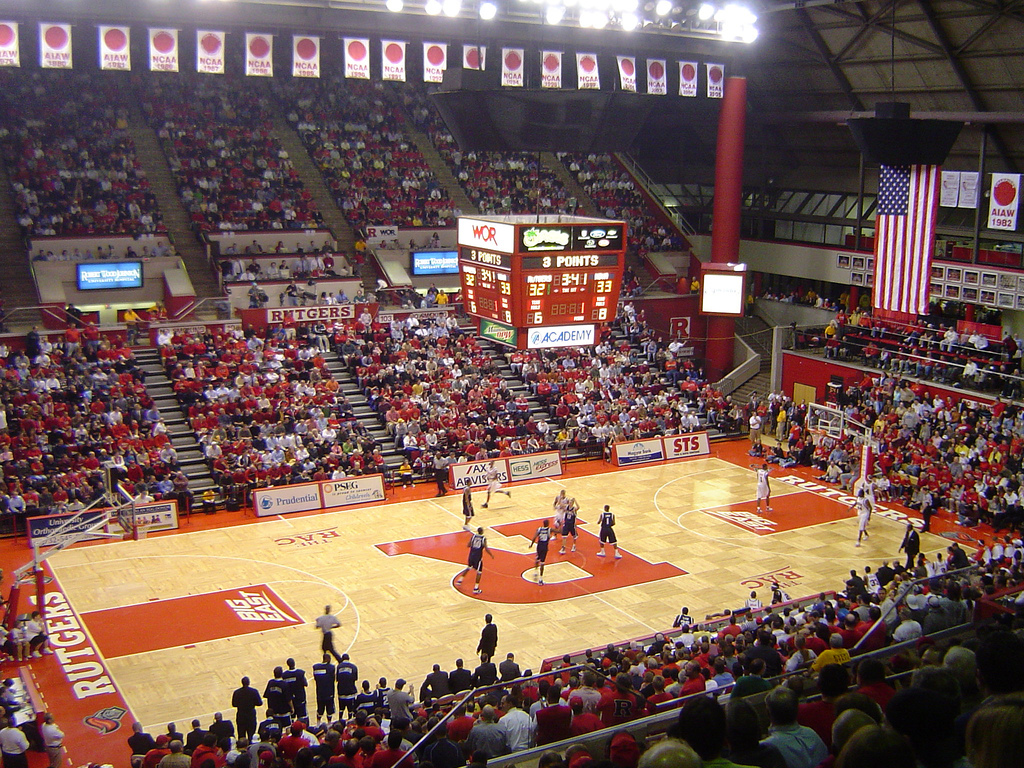
Jersey Mike's Arena (Rutgers)

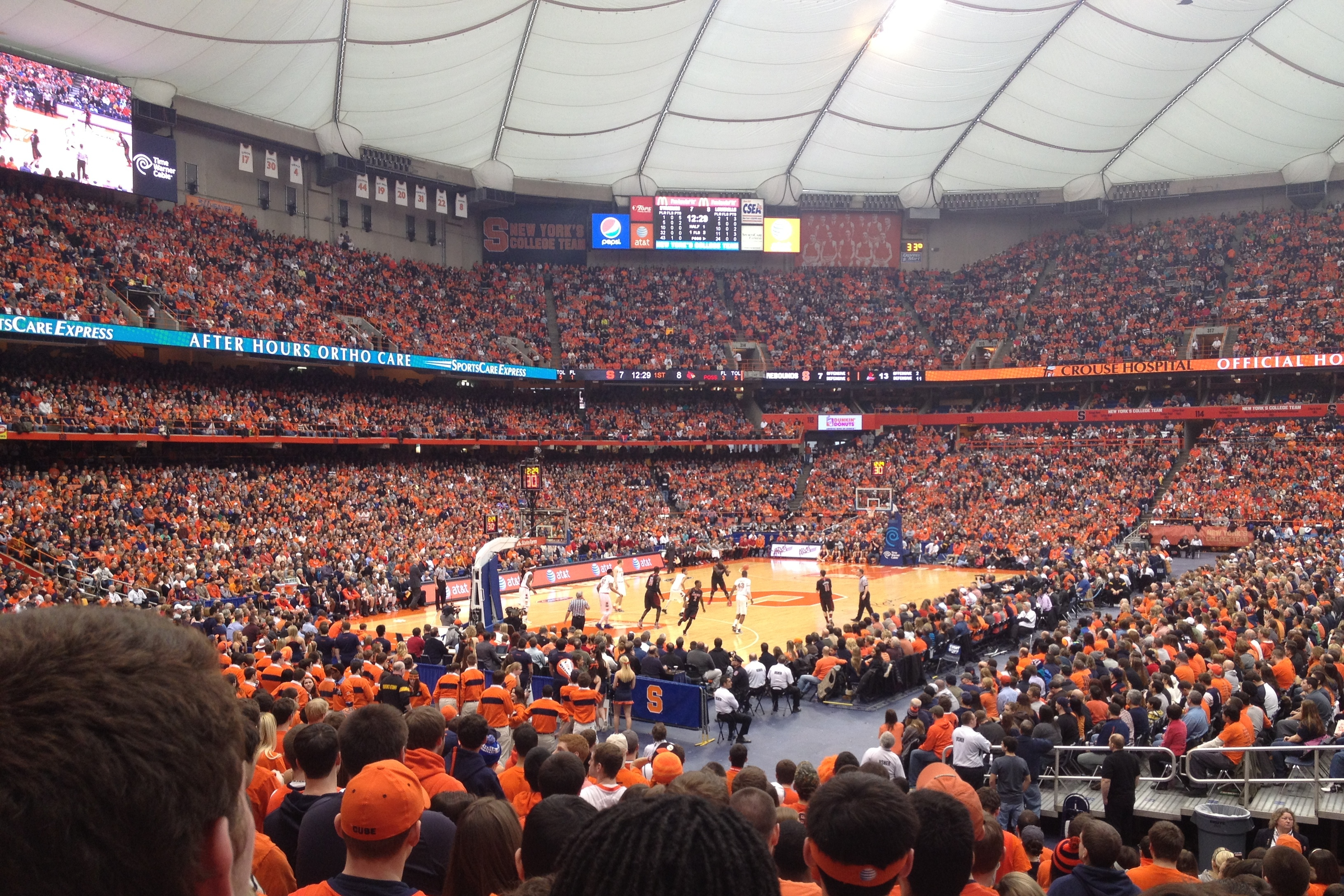
JMA Wireless Dome (Syracuse)

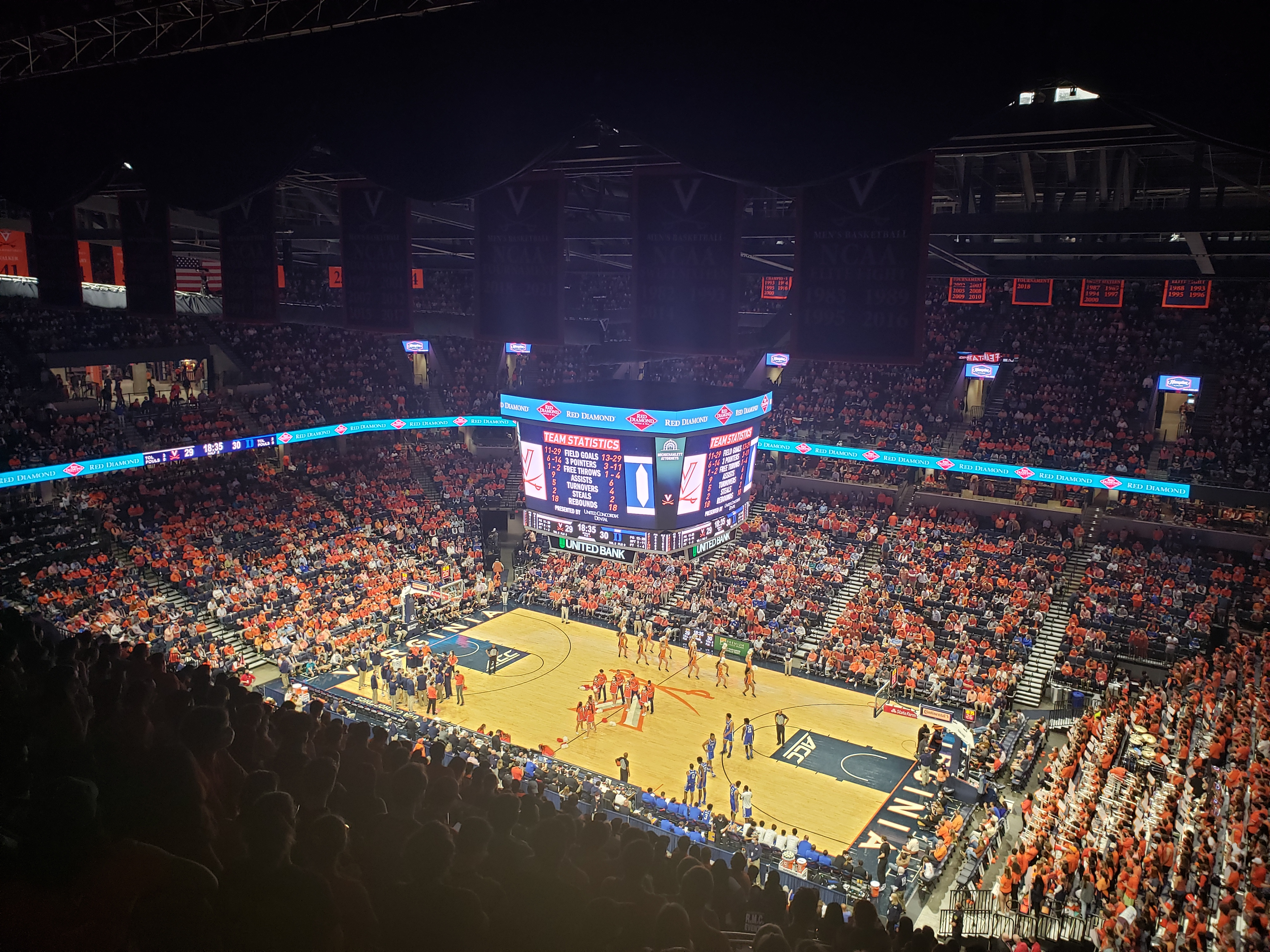
John Paul Jones Arena (Virginia)

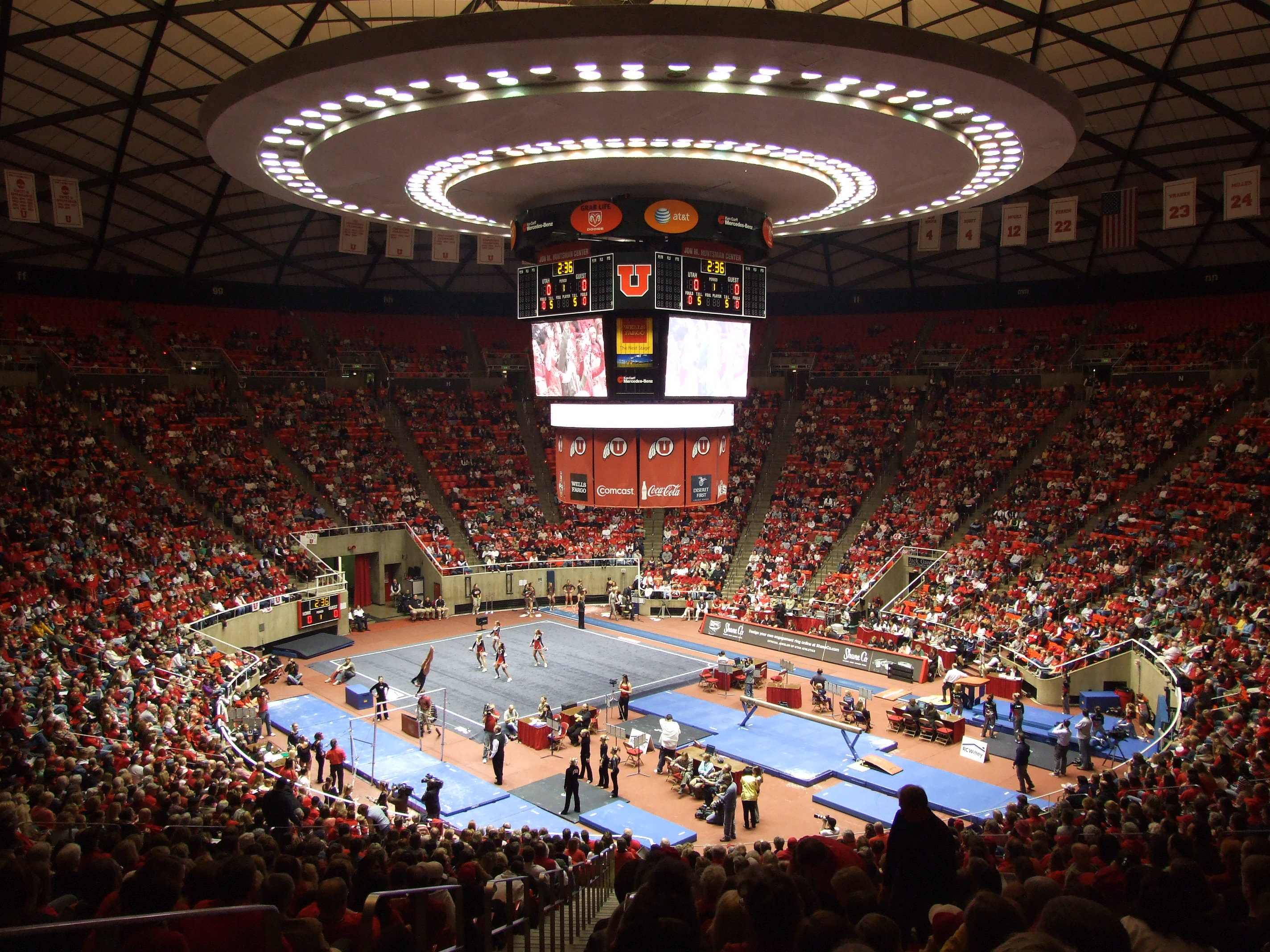
Jon M. Huntsman Center (Utah)

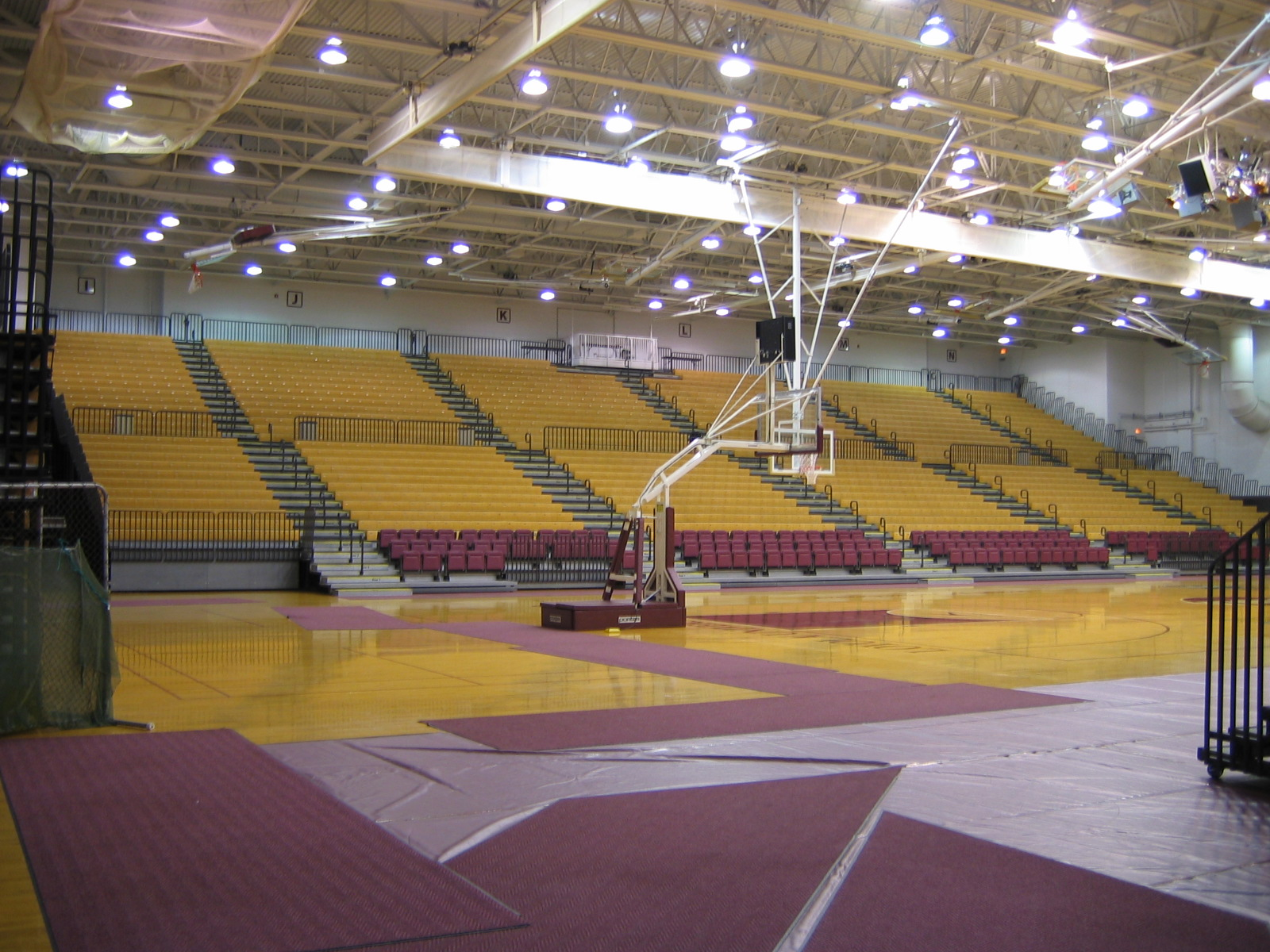
Joseph J. Gentile Arena (Loyola Chicago)

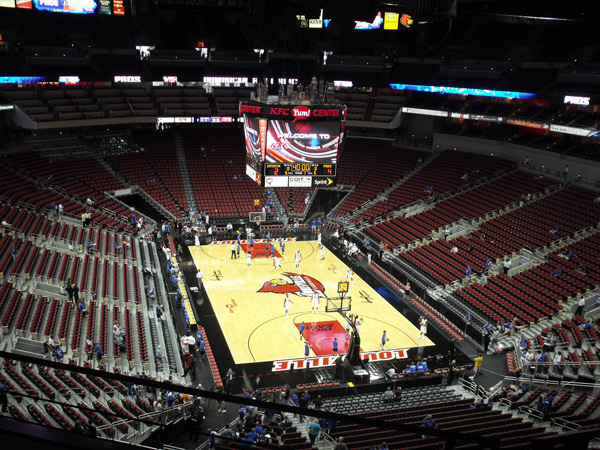
KFC Yum! Center (Louisville)

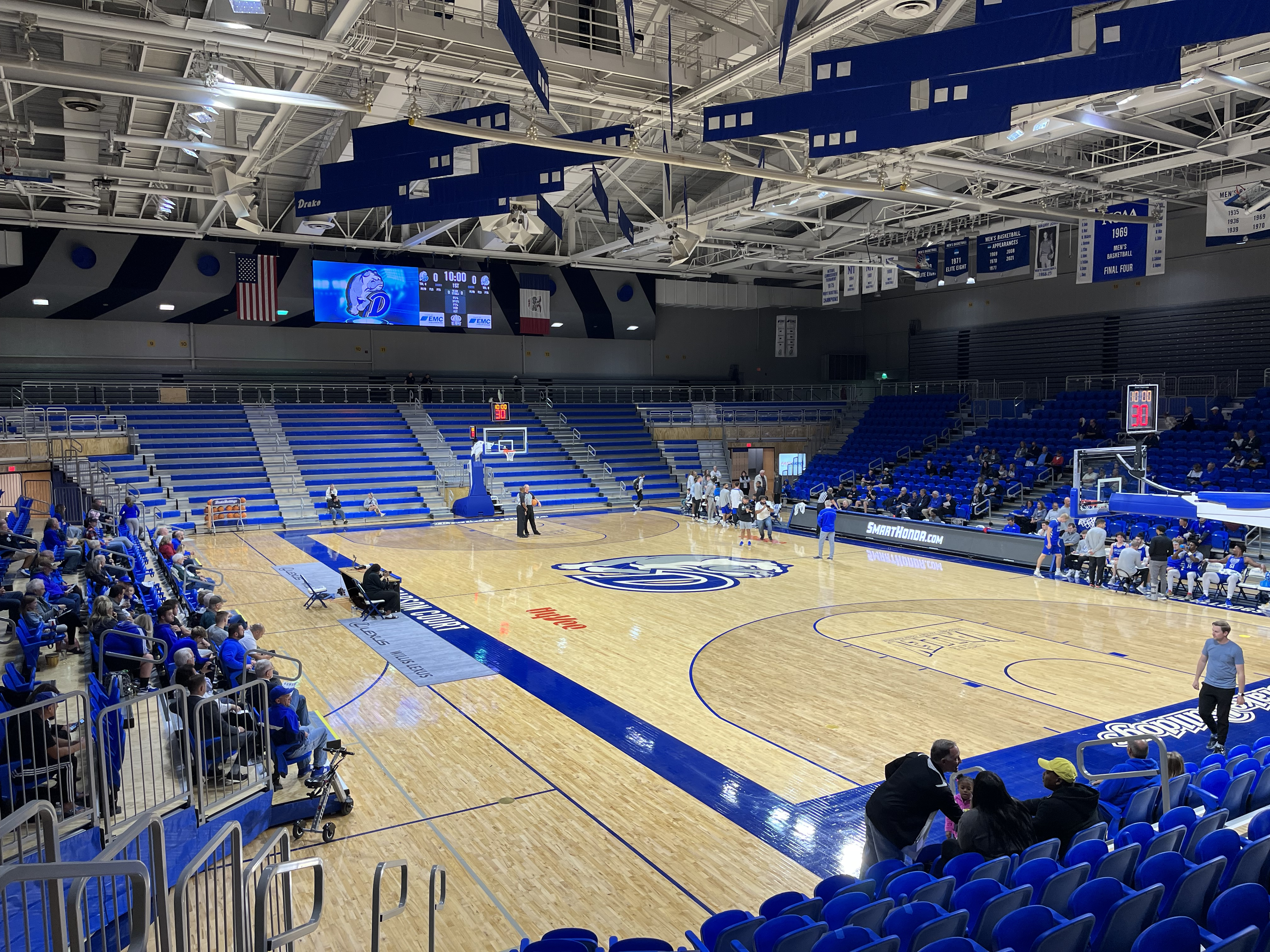
Knapp Center (Drake)

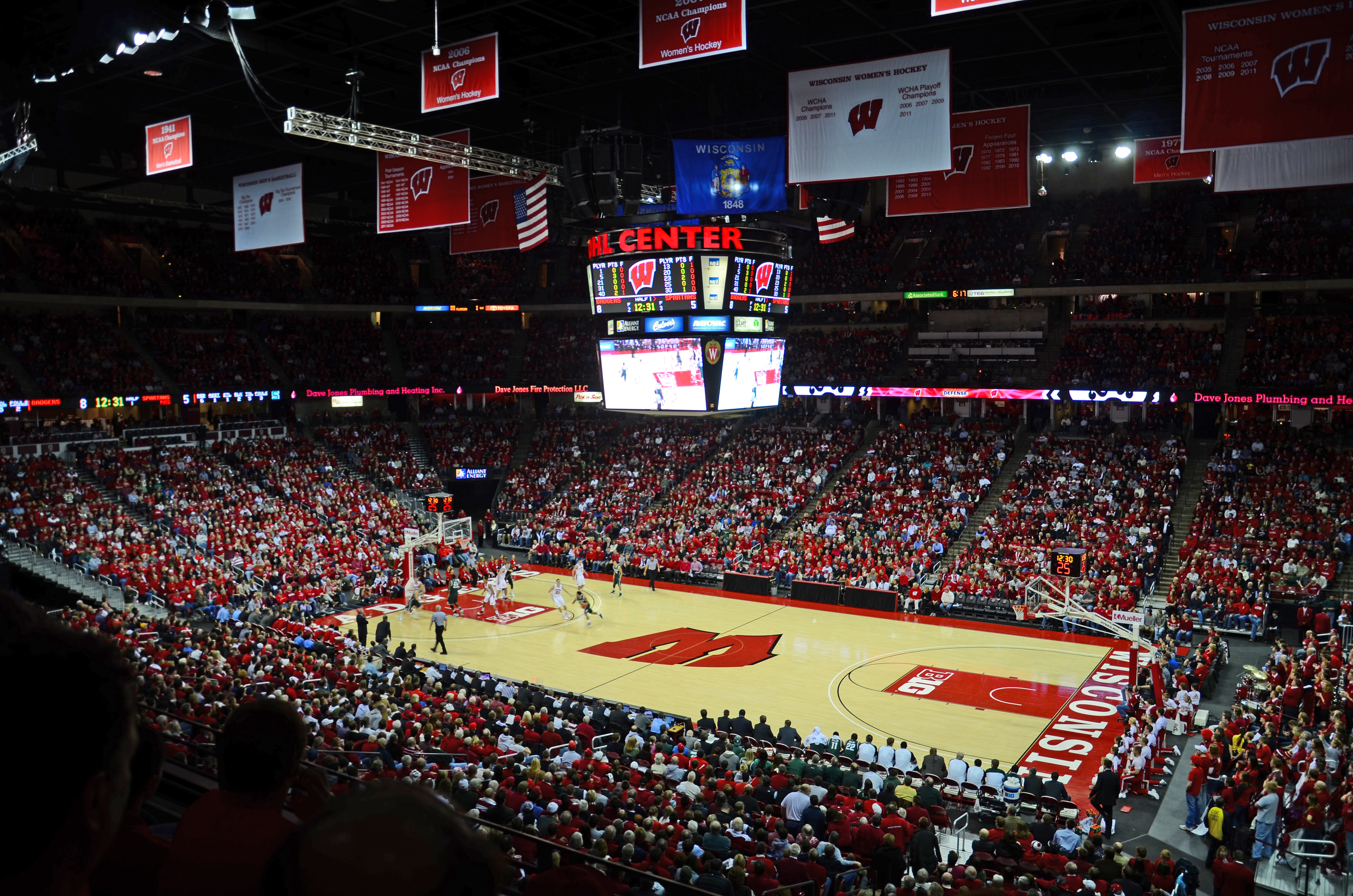
Kohl Center (Wisconsin)

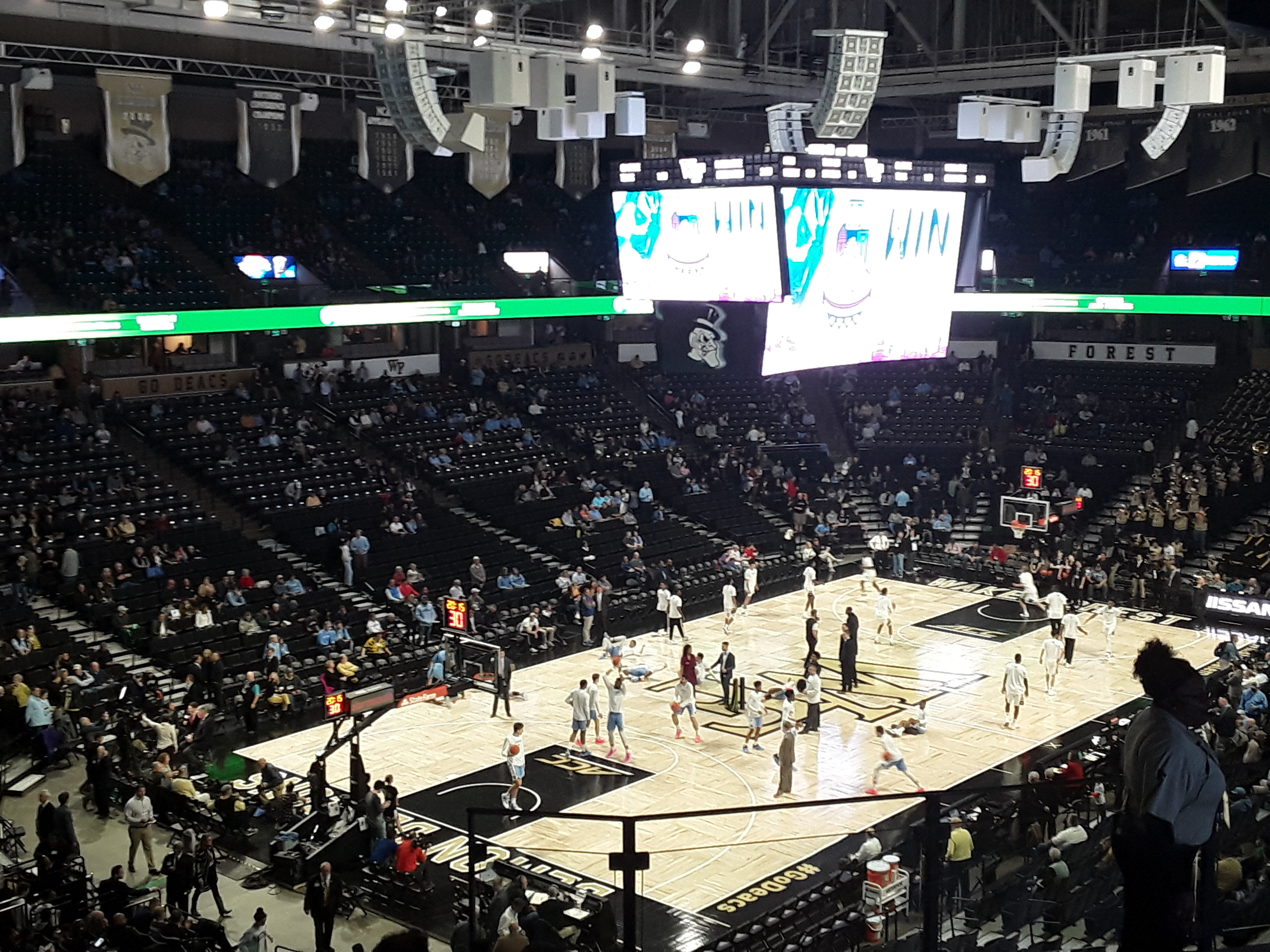
Lawrence Joel Veterans Memorial Coliseum (Wake Forest)

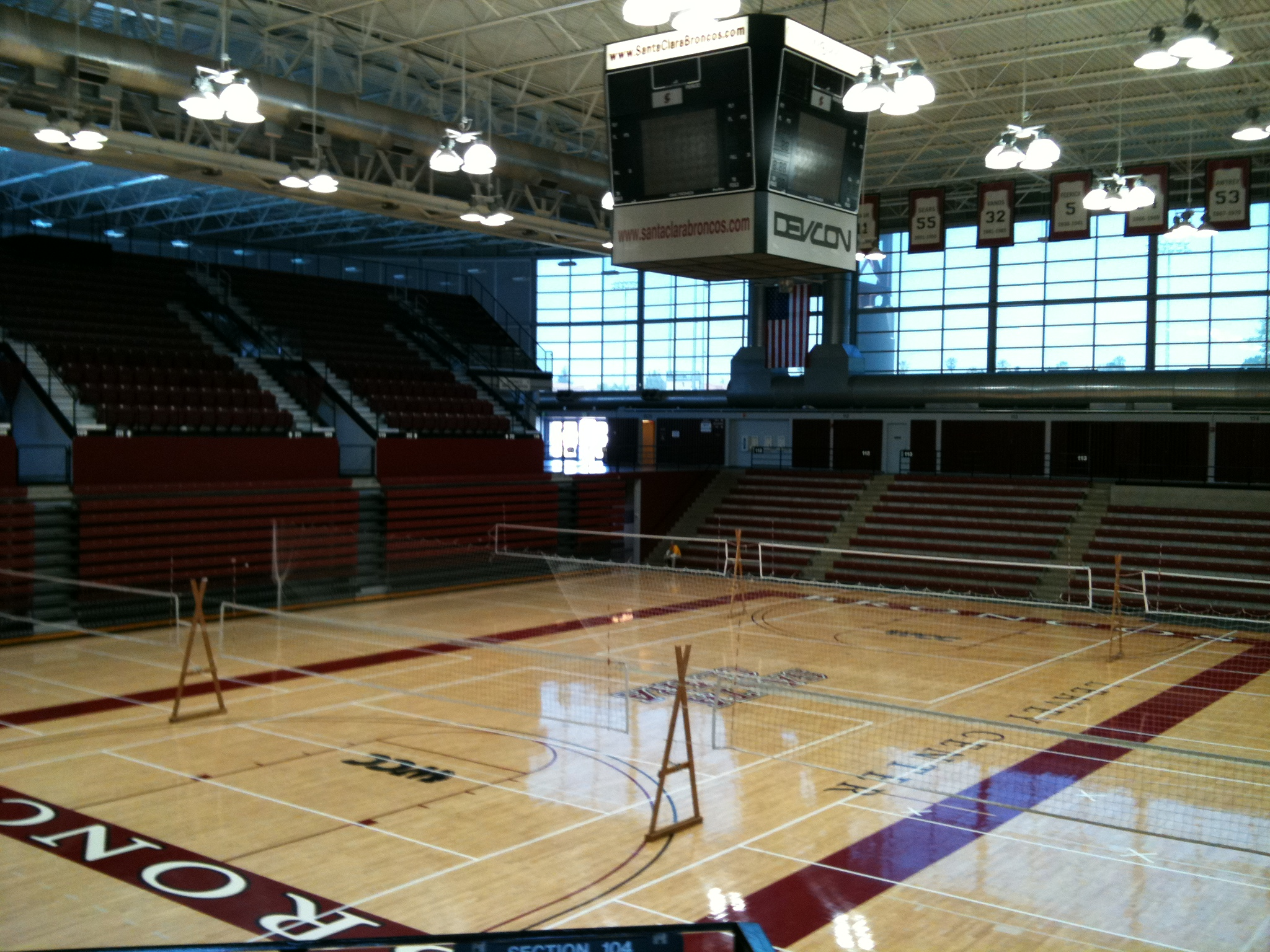
Leavey Center (Santa Clara)

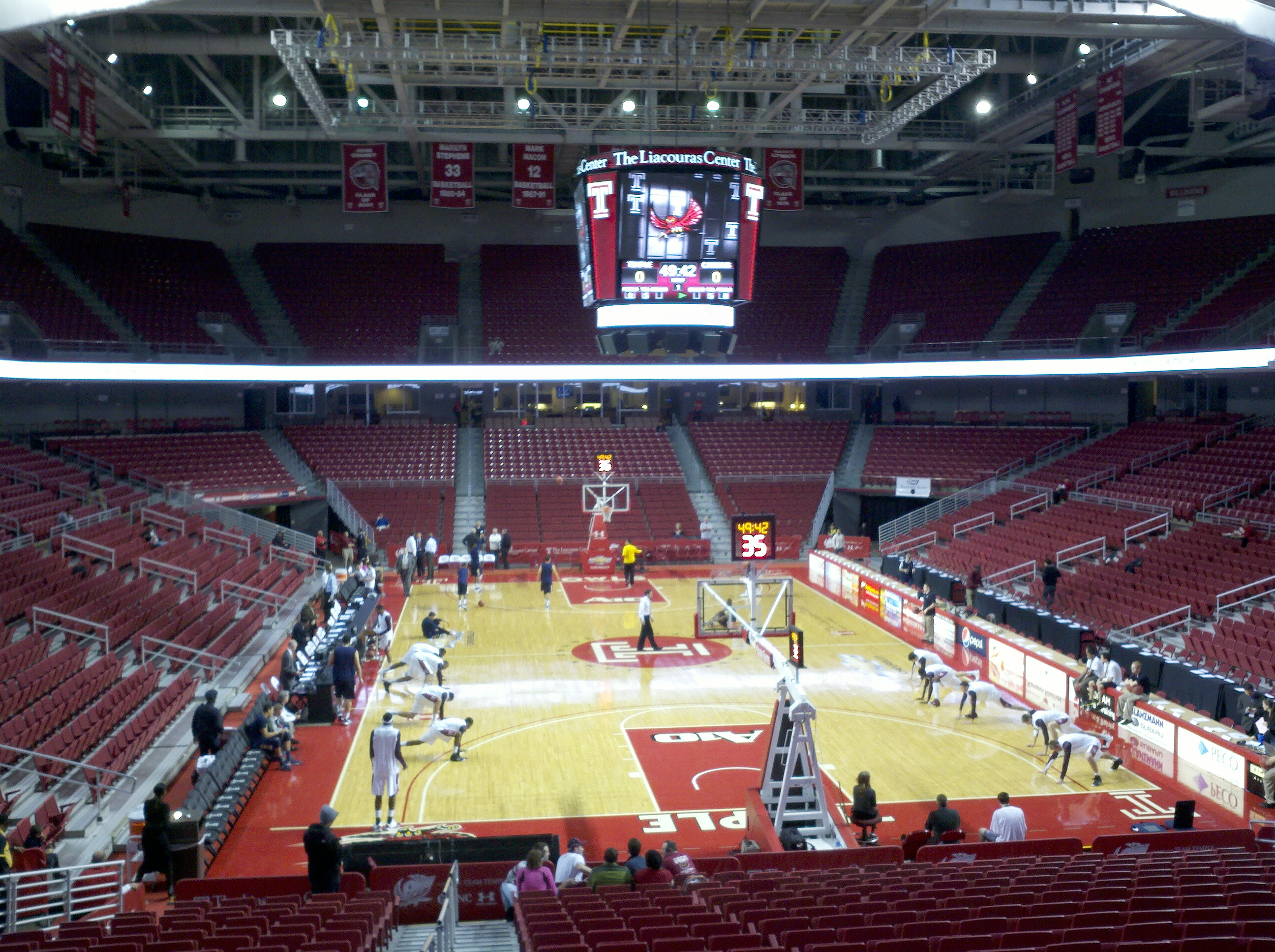
Liacouras Center (Temple)

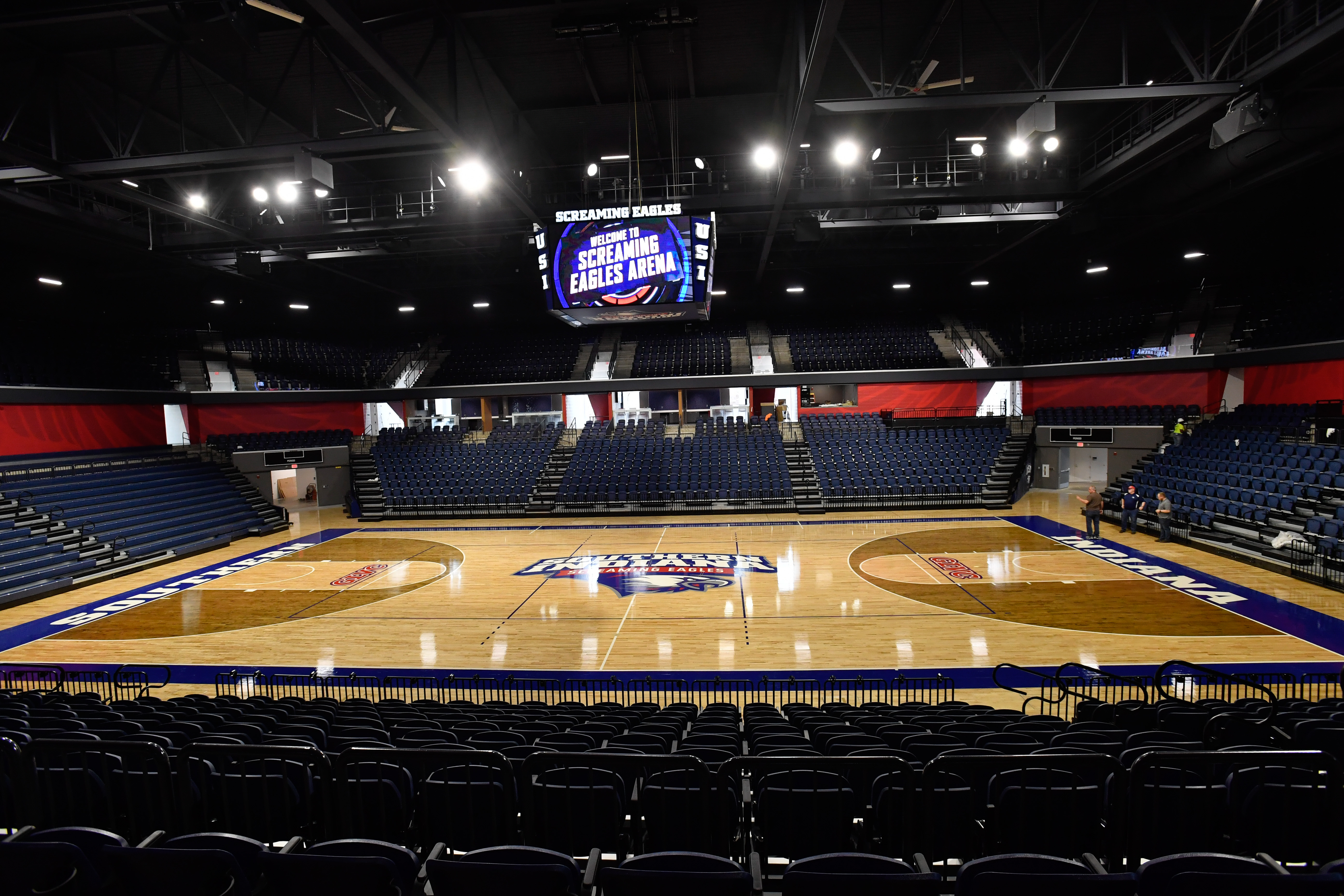
Liberty Arena (Southern Indiana)

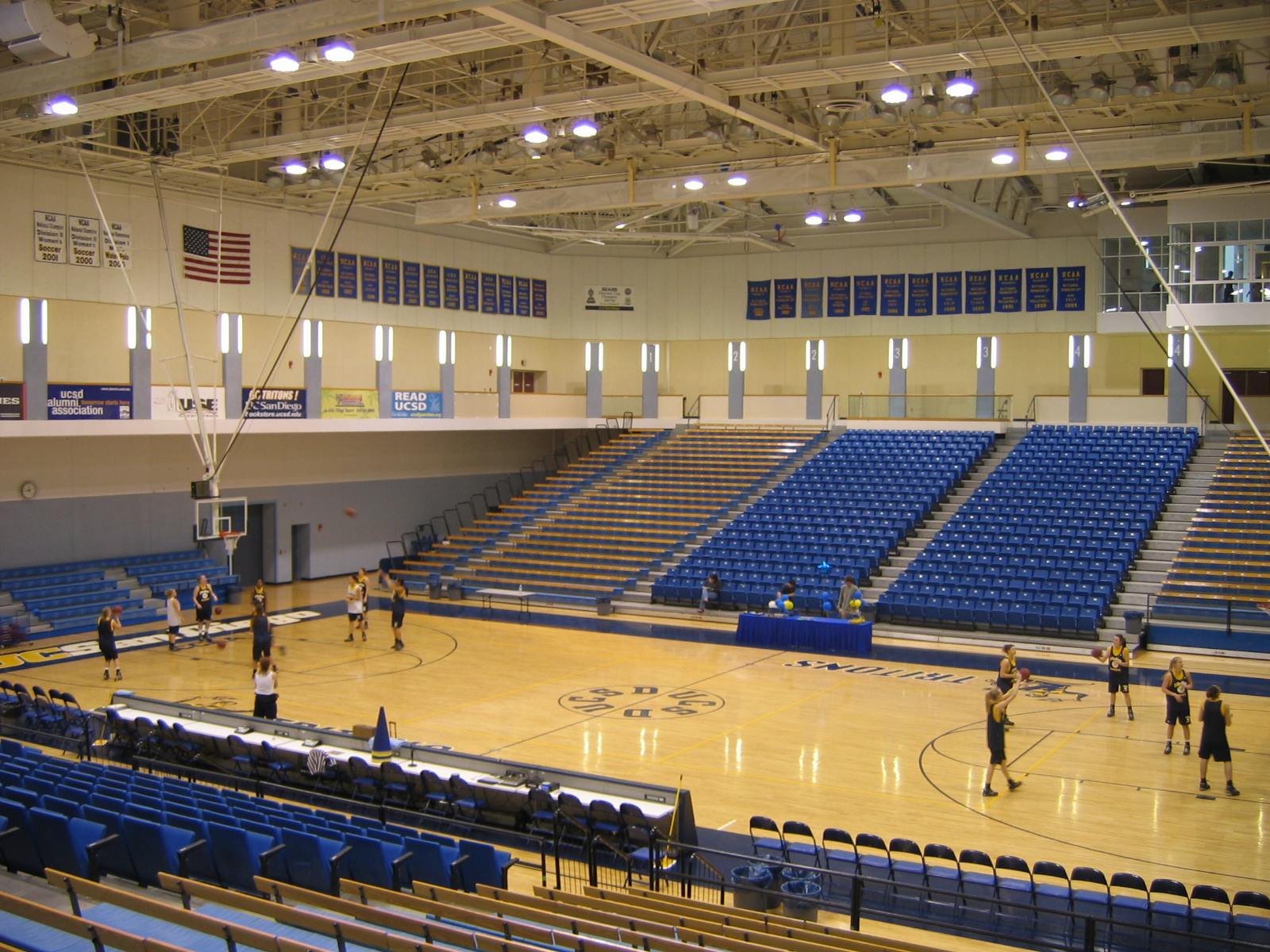
LionTree Arena (UC San Diego)

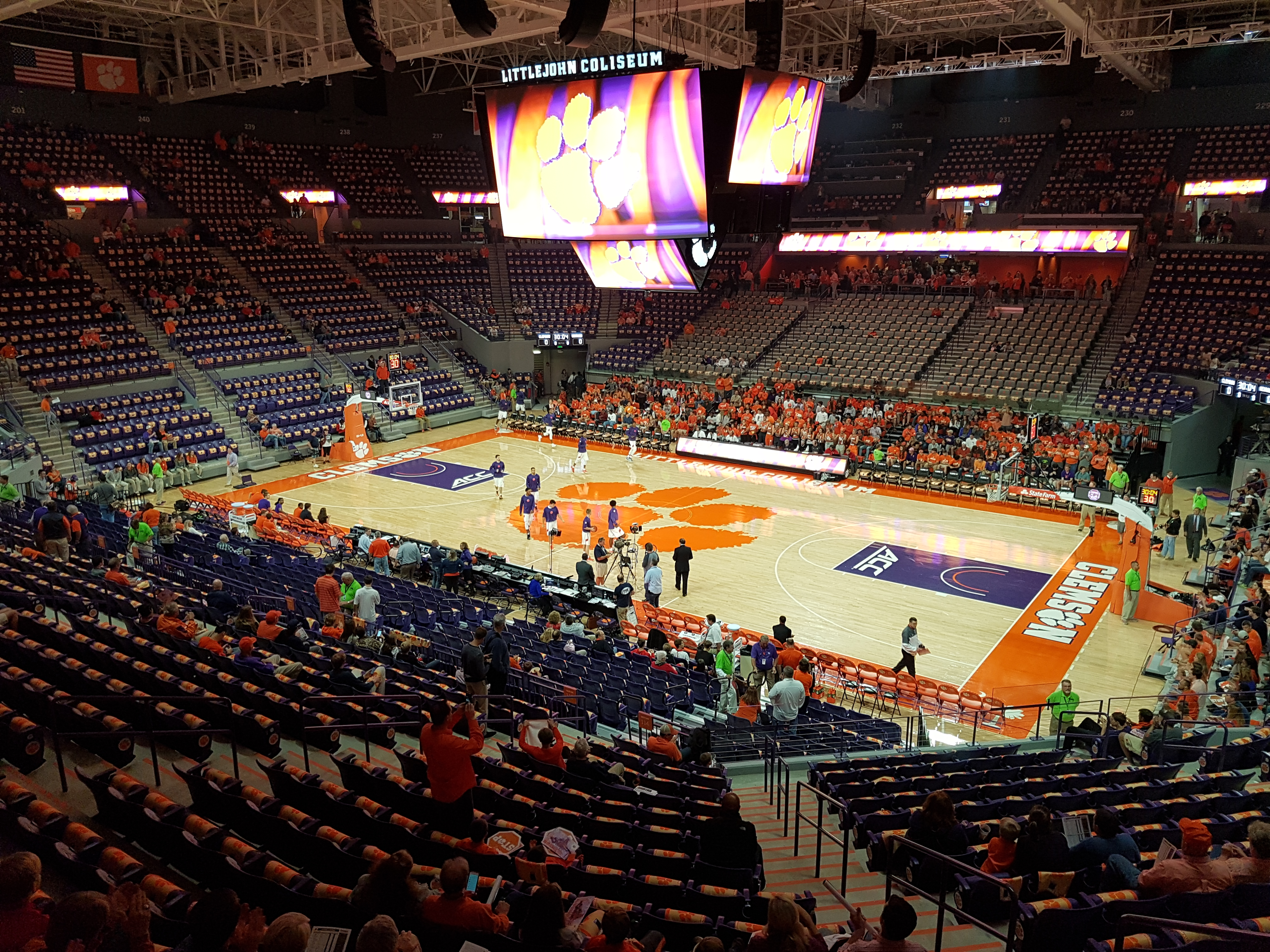
Littlejohn Coliseum (Clemson)

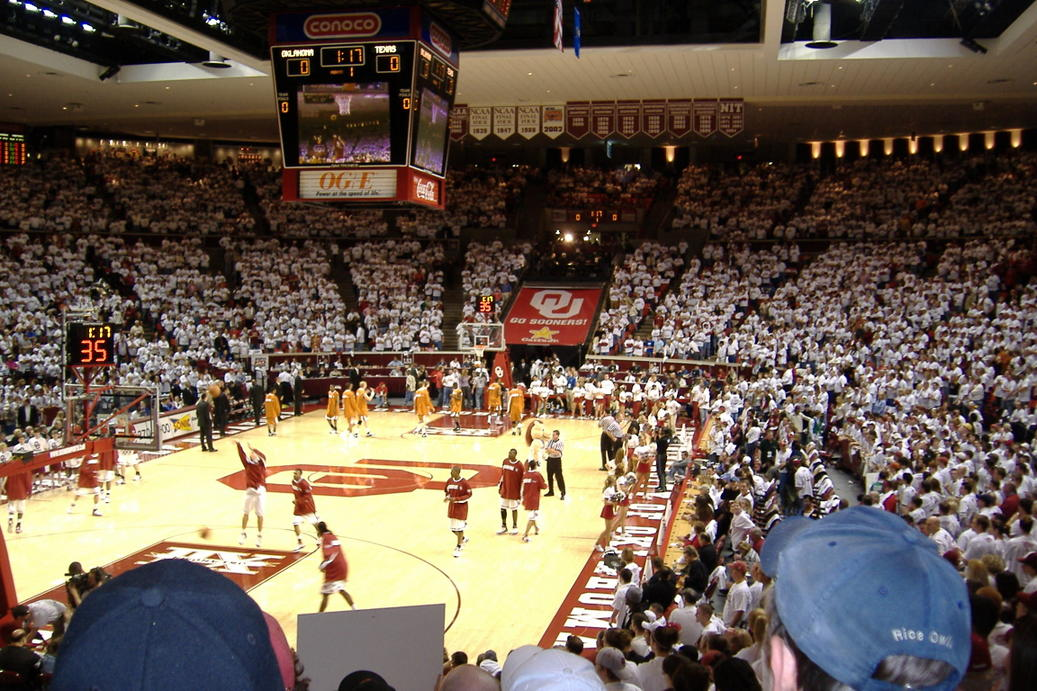
Lloyd Noble Center (Oklahoma)

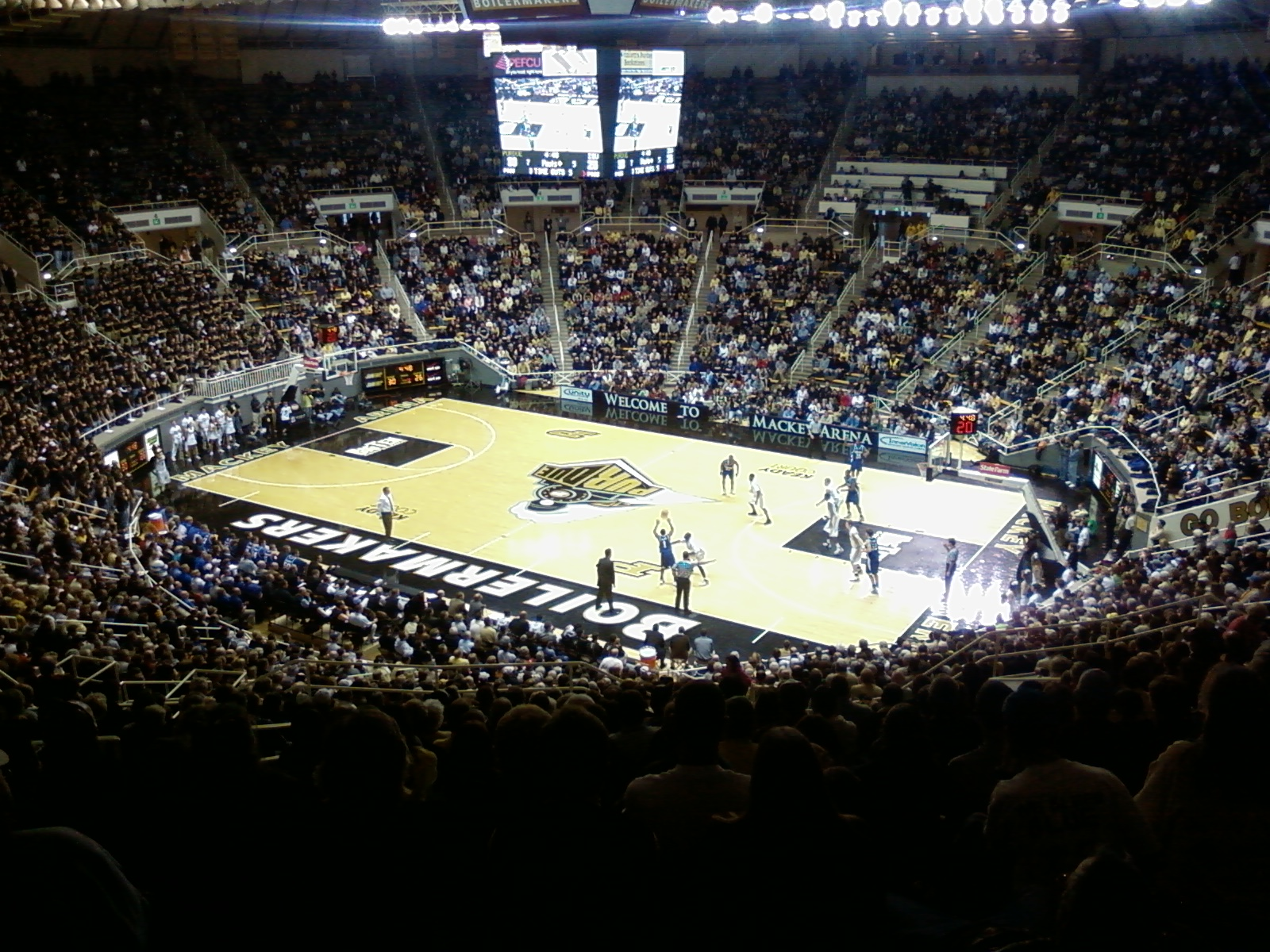
Mackey Arena (Purdue)

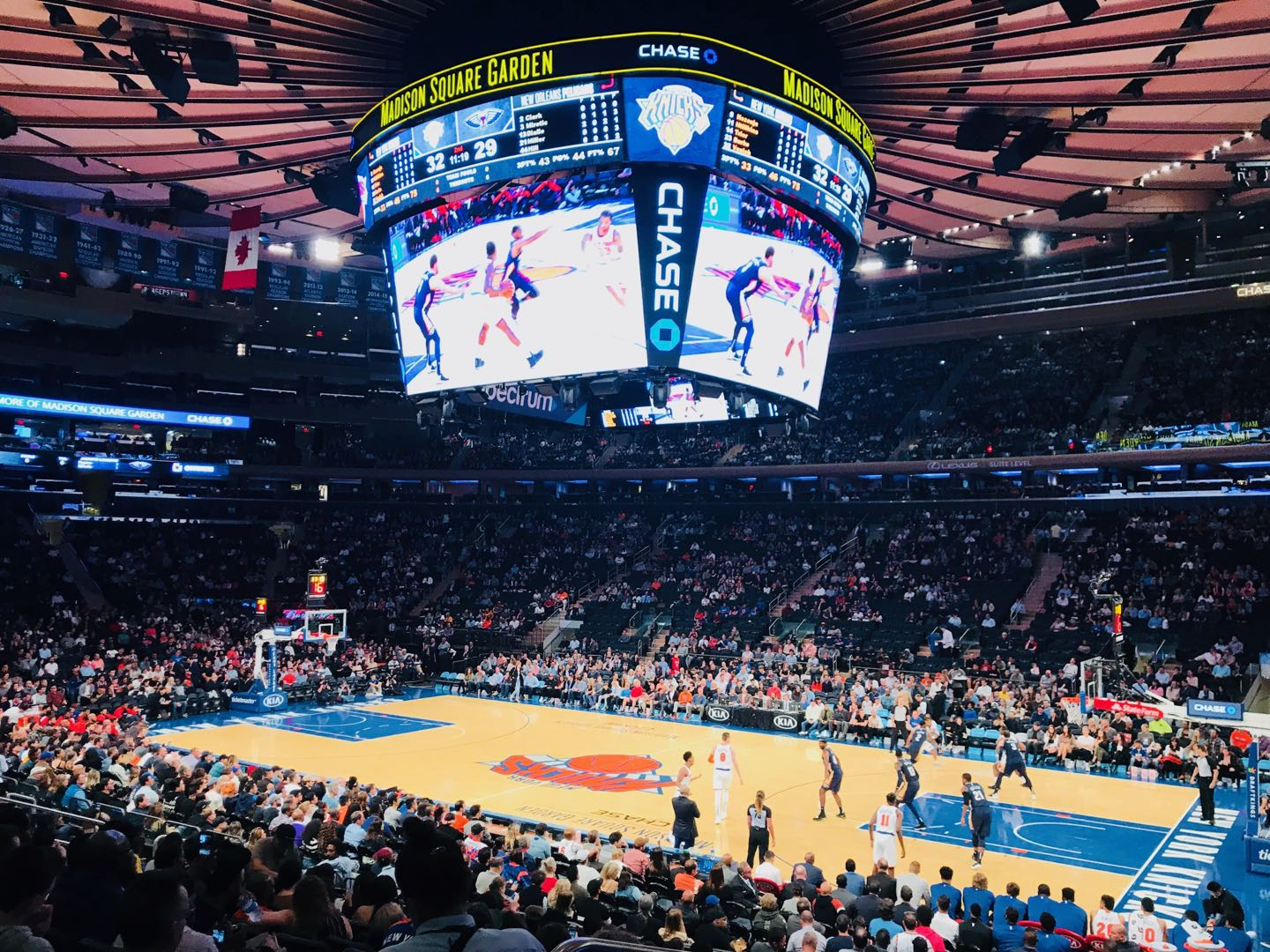
Madison Square Garden (St. John's)

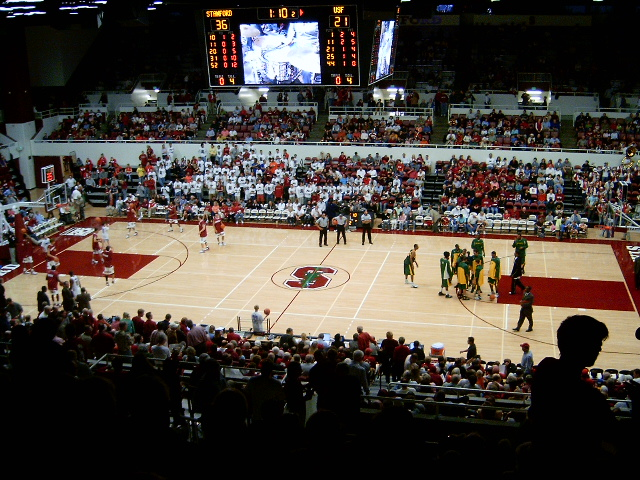
Maples Pavilion (Stanford)

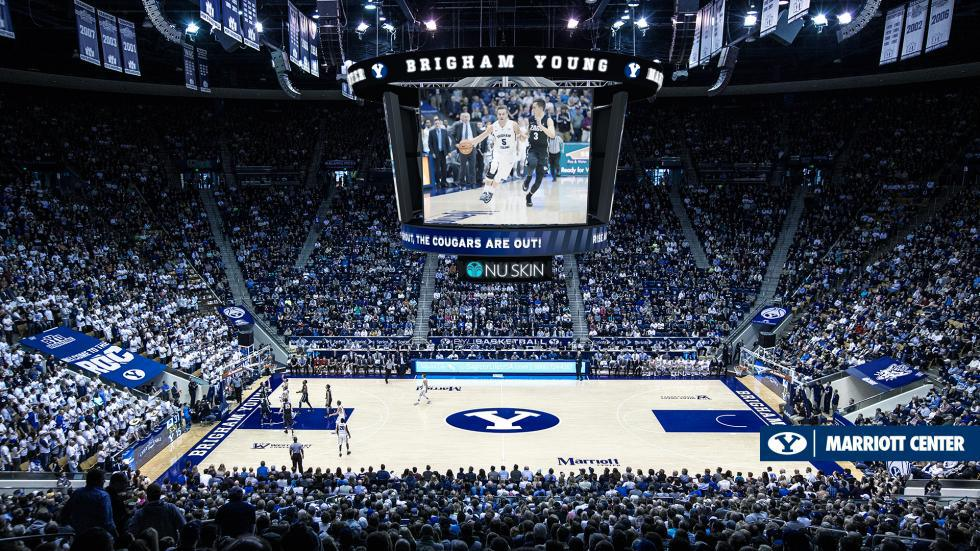
Marriott Center (BYU)

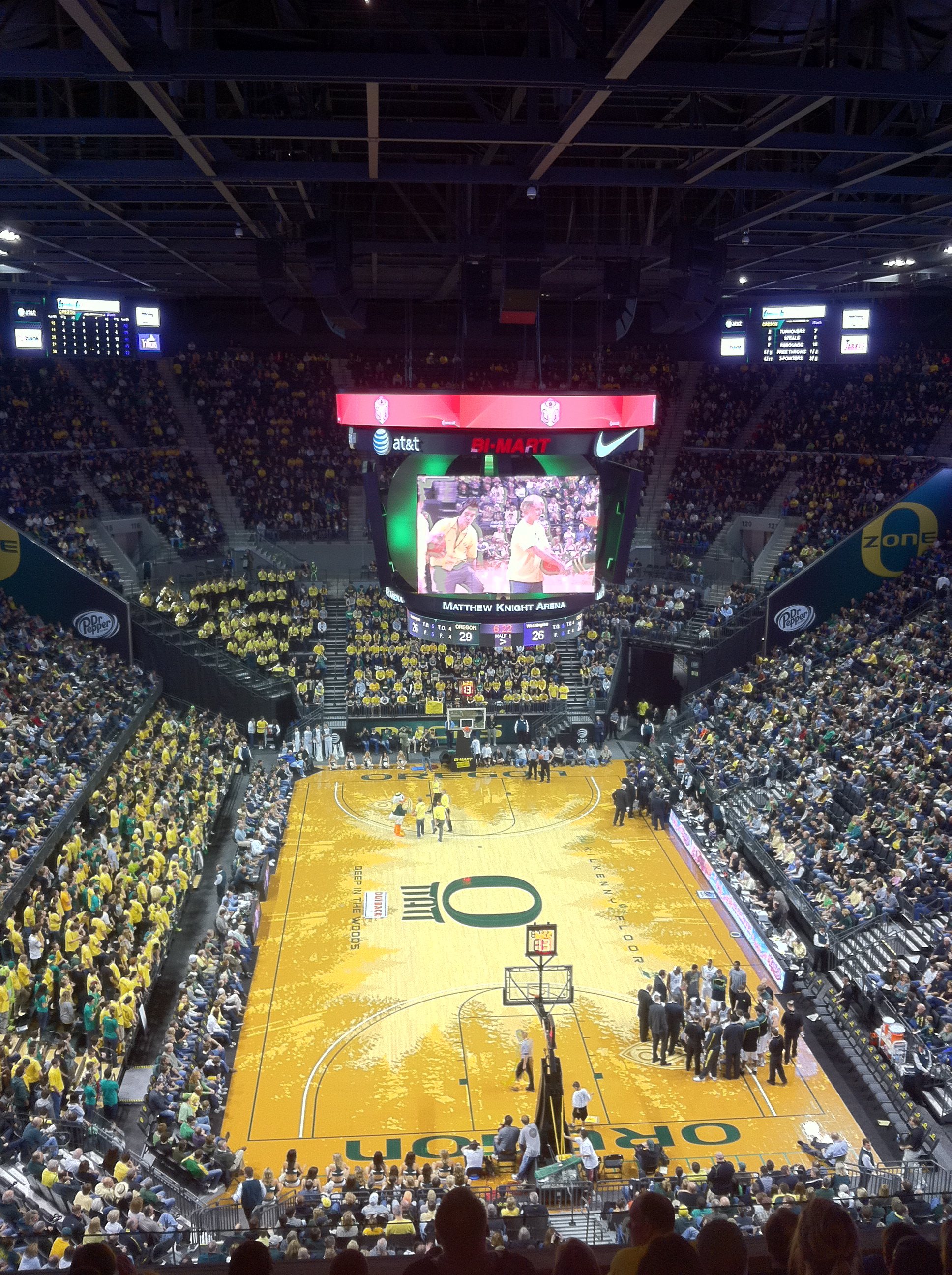
Matthew Knight Arena (Oregon)

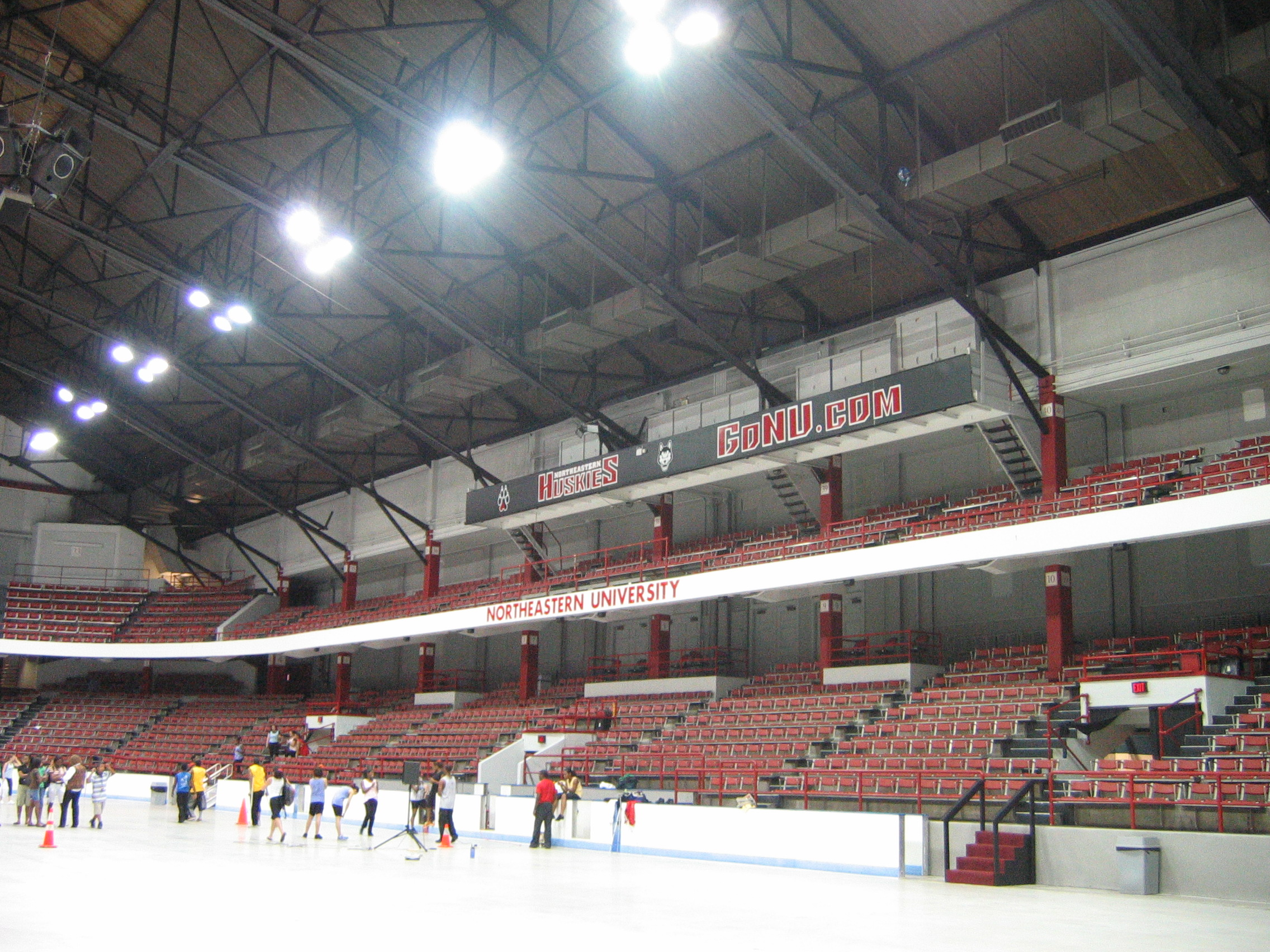
Matthews Arena (Northeastern)

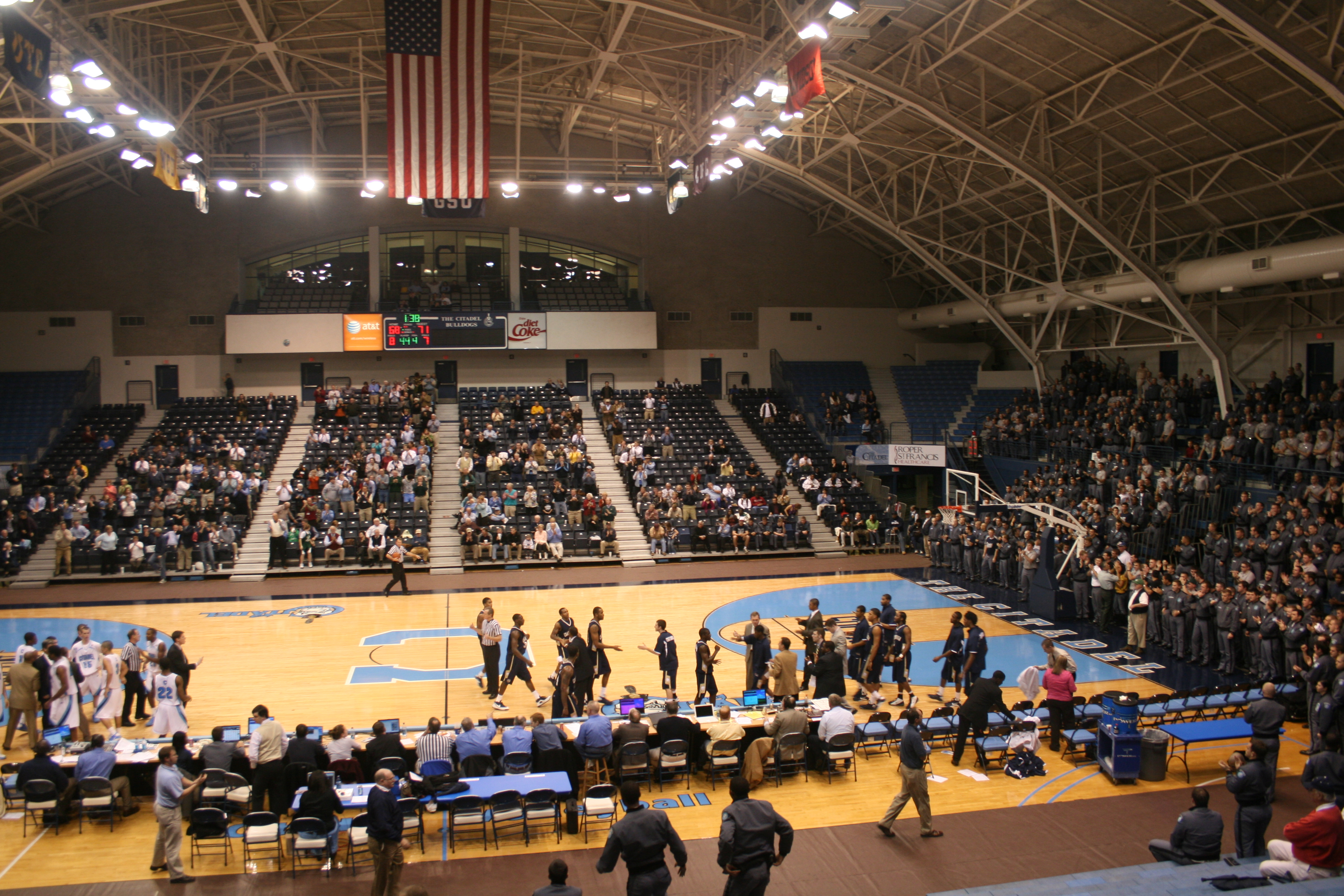
McAlister Field House (The Citadel)

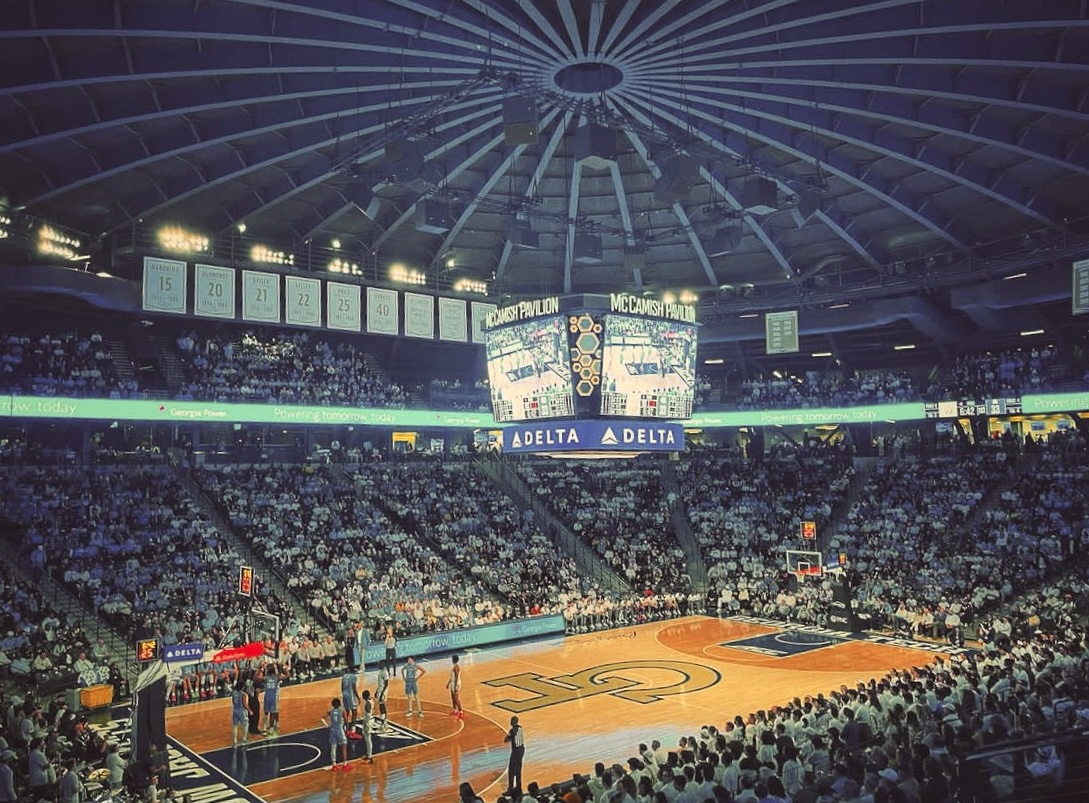
McCamish Pavilion (Georgia Tech)

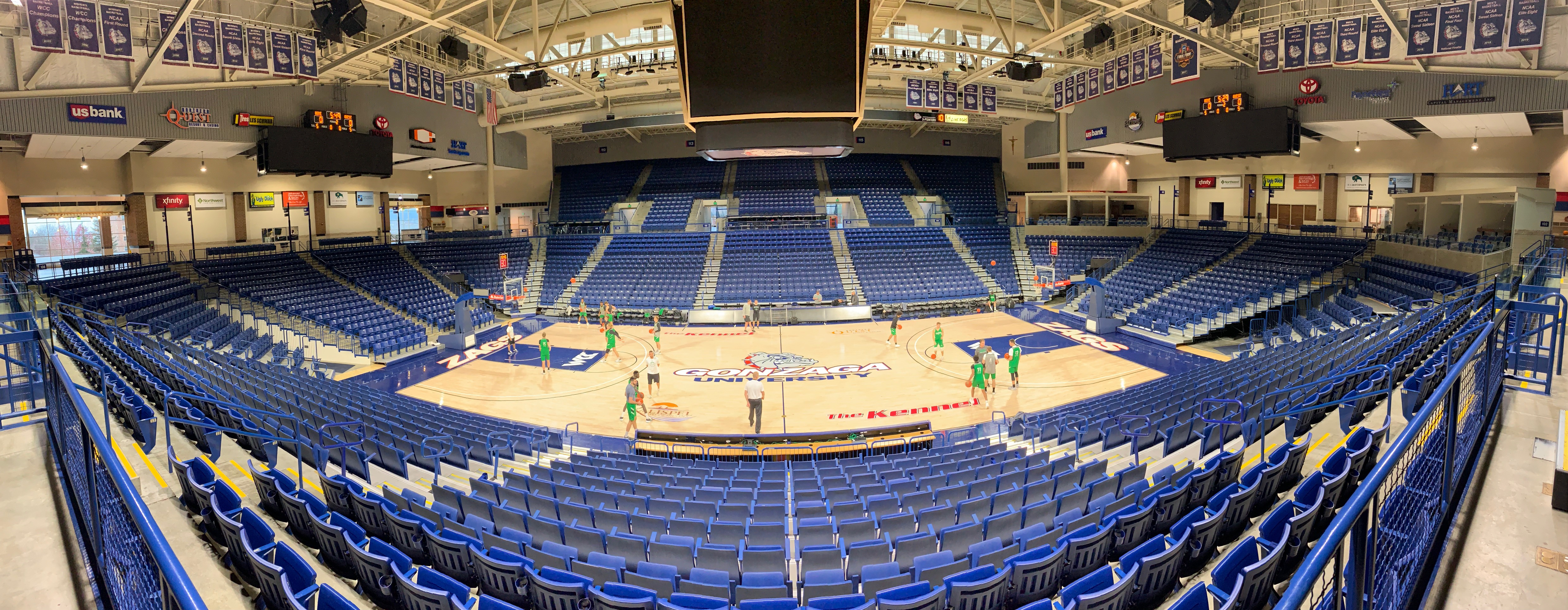
McCarthey Athletic Center (Gonzaga)

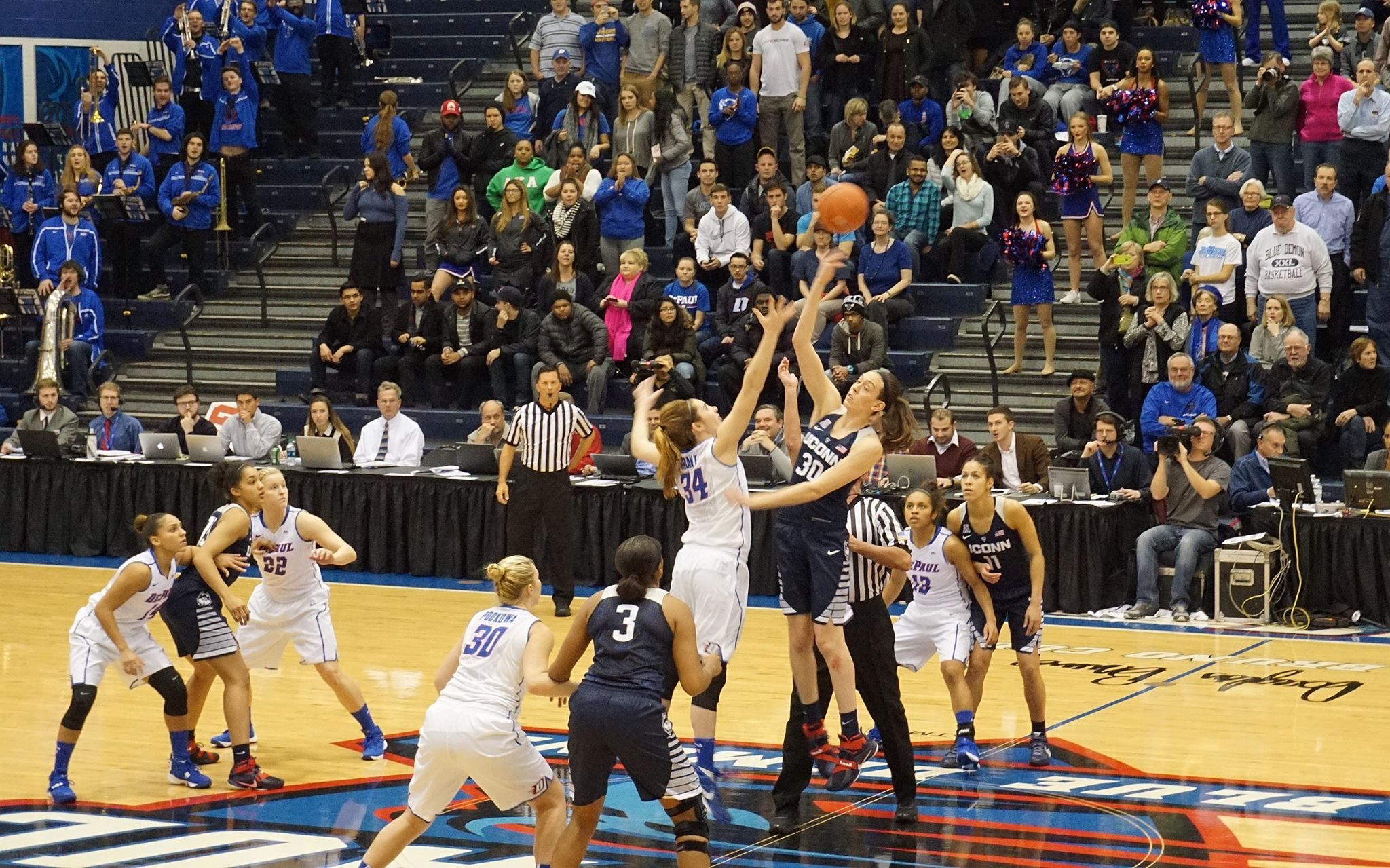
McGrath-Phillips Arena (DePaul)

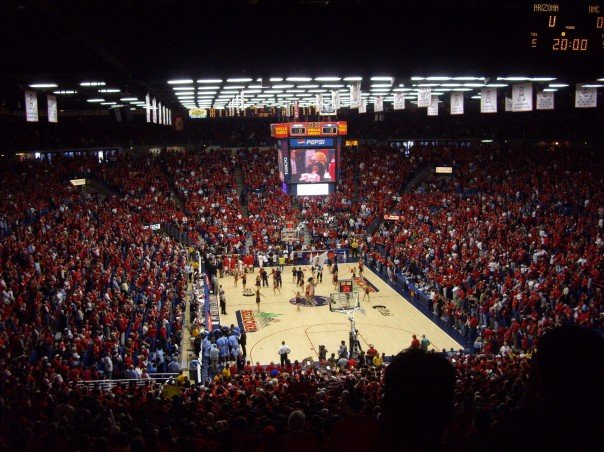
McKale Center (Arizona)

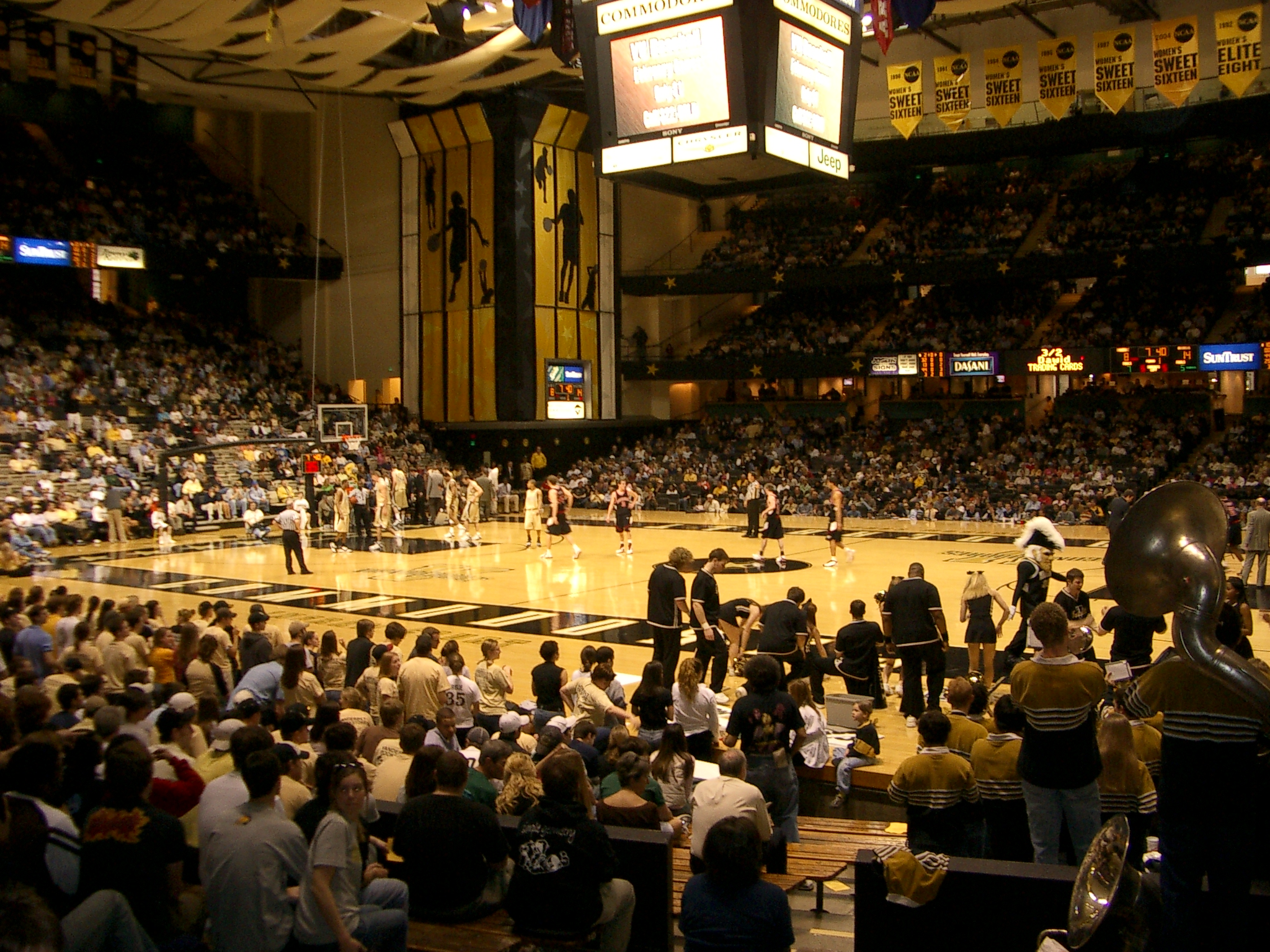
Memorial Gymnasium (Vanderbilt)

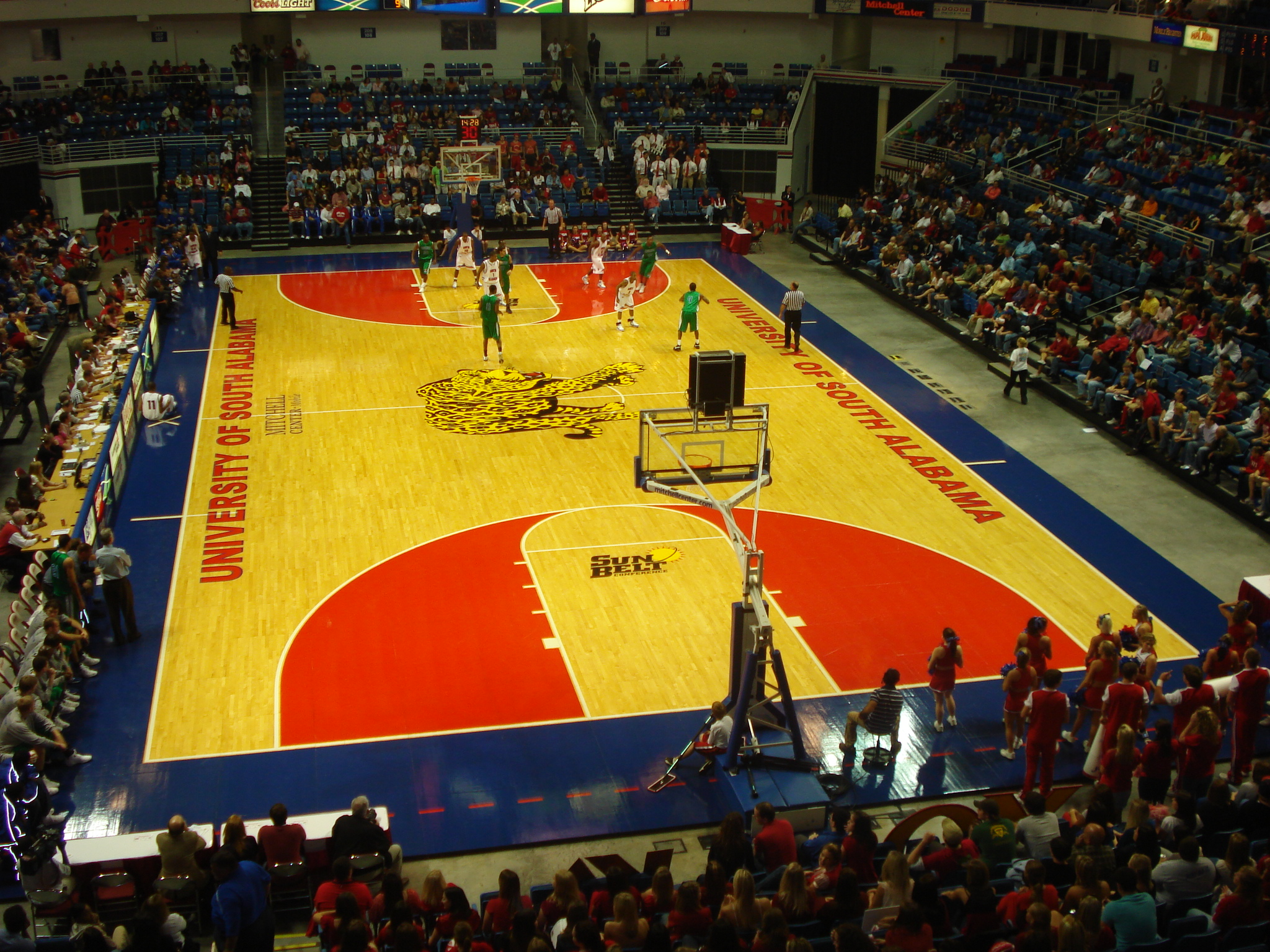
Mitchell Center (South Alabama)

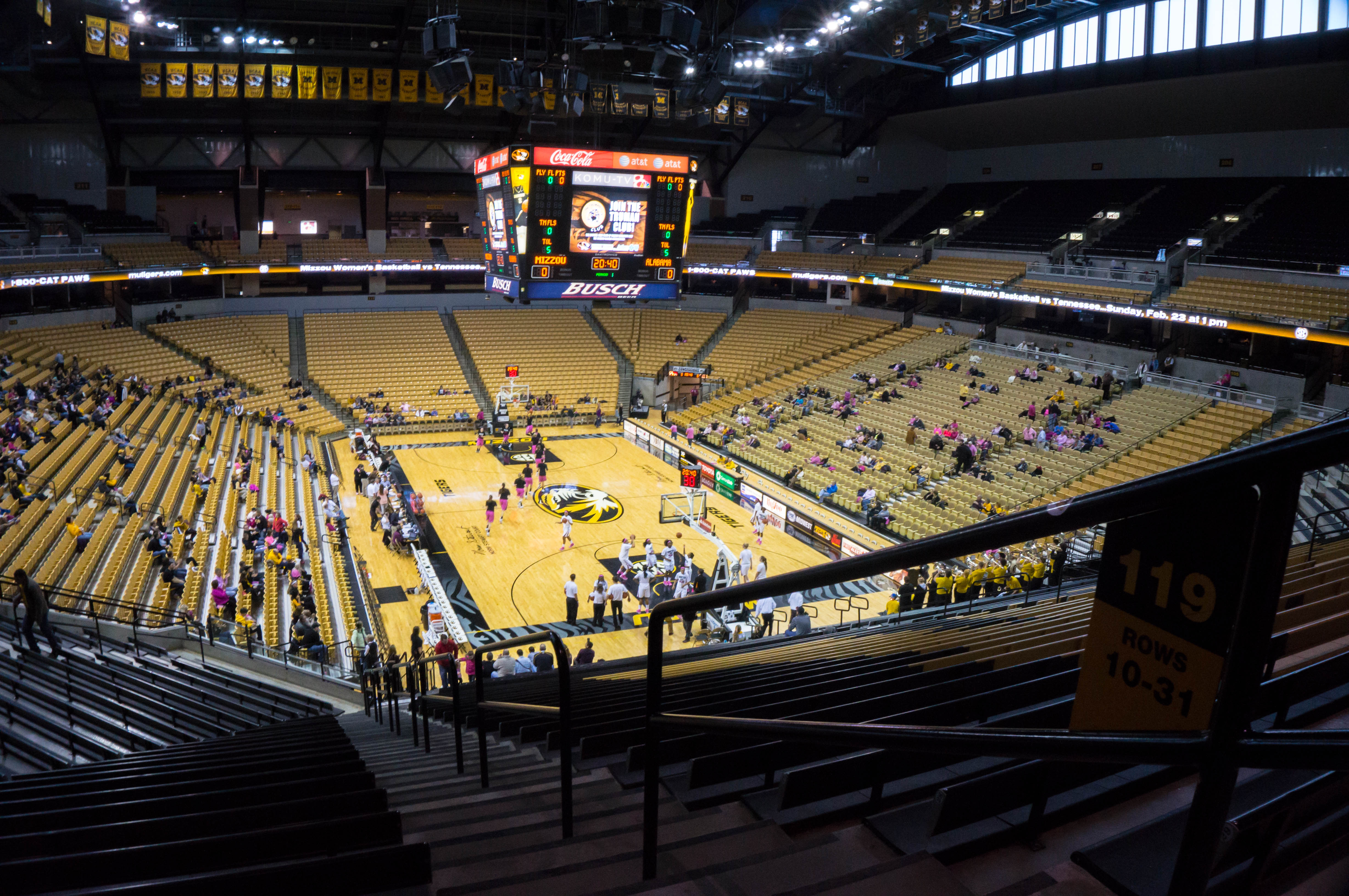
Mizzou Arena (Missouri)

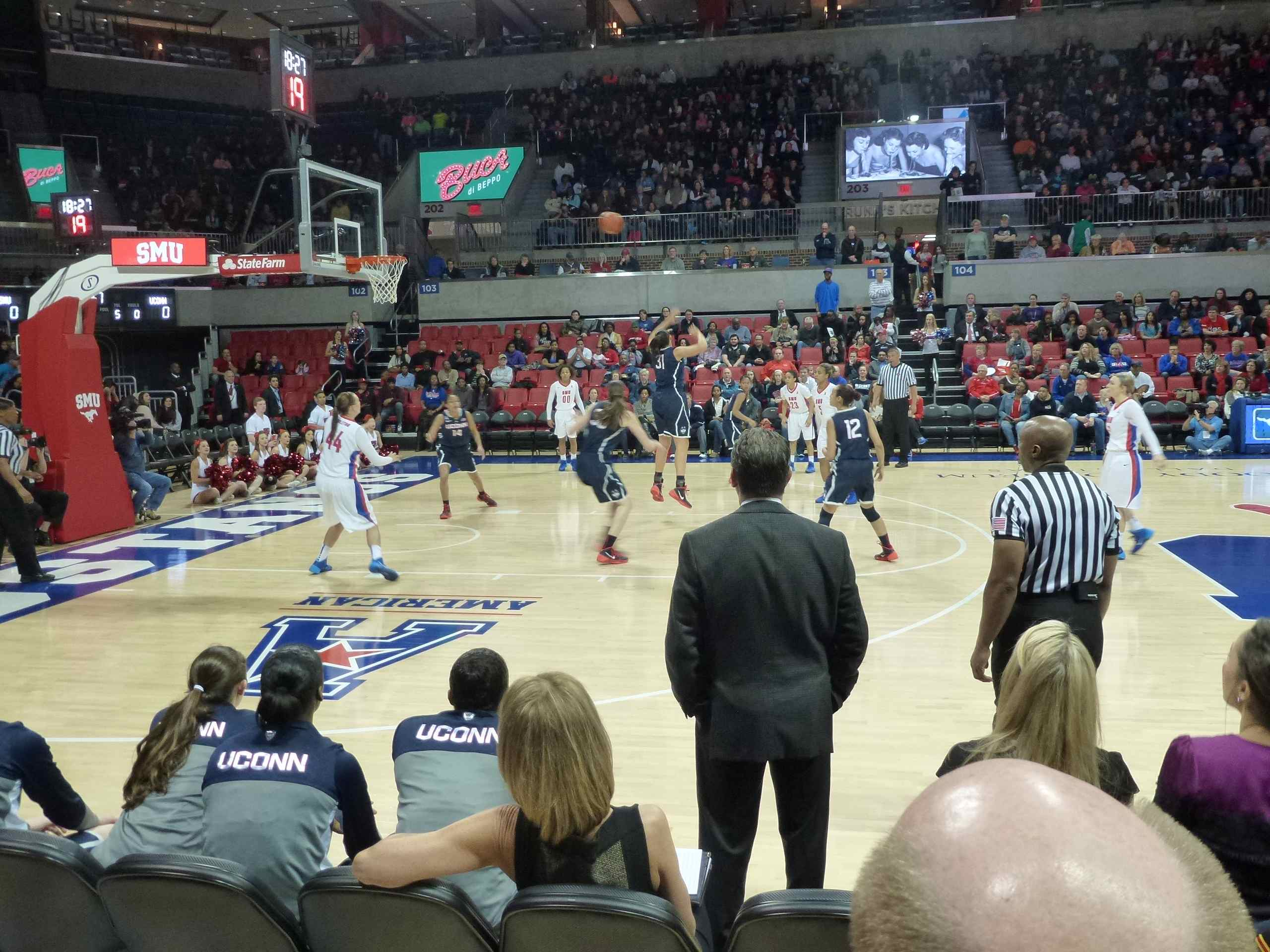
Moody Coliseum (SMU)

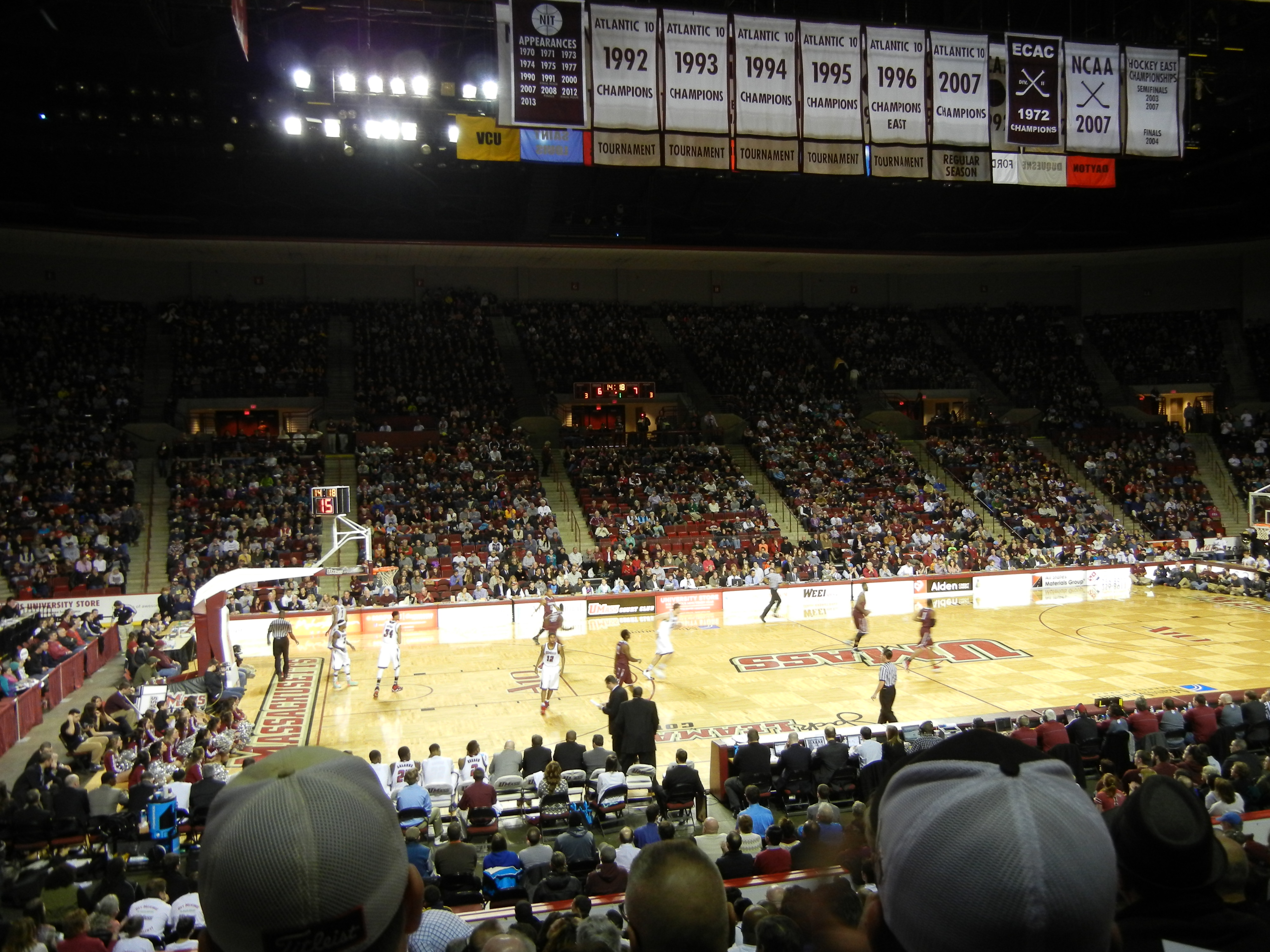
Mullins Center (UMass)

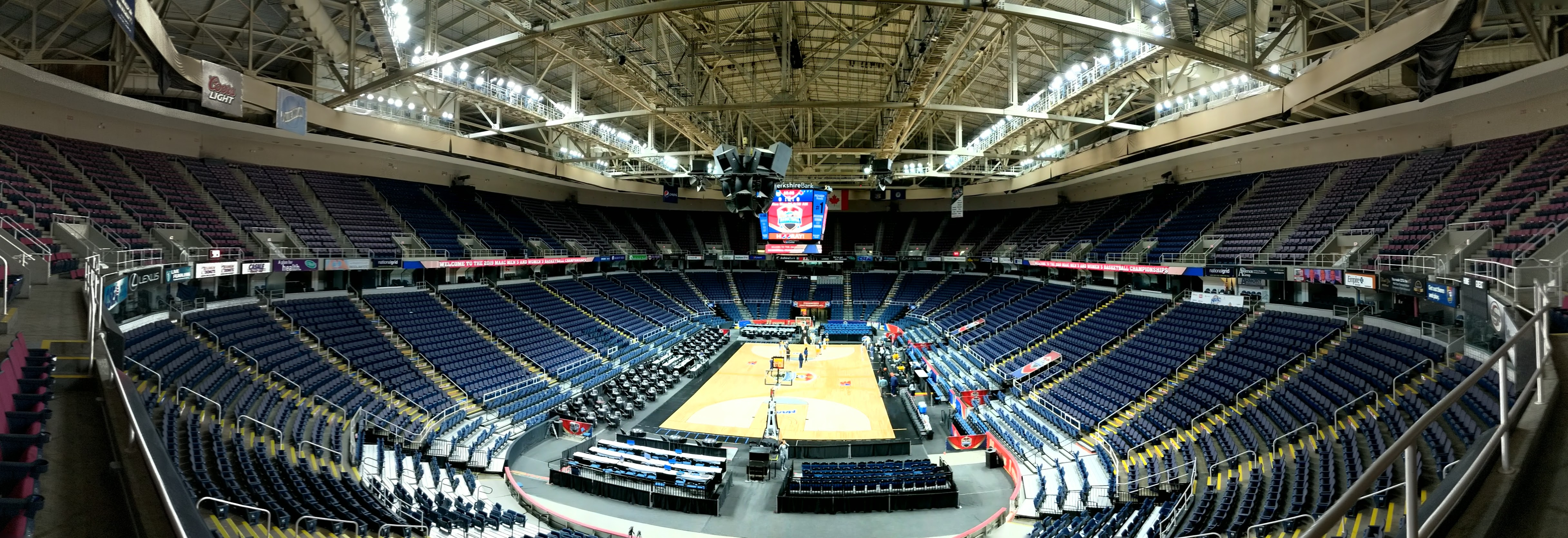
MVP Arena (Siena)

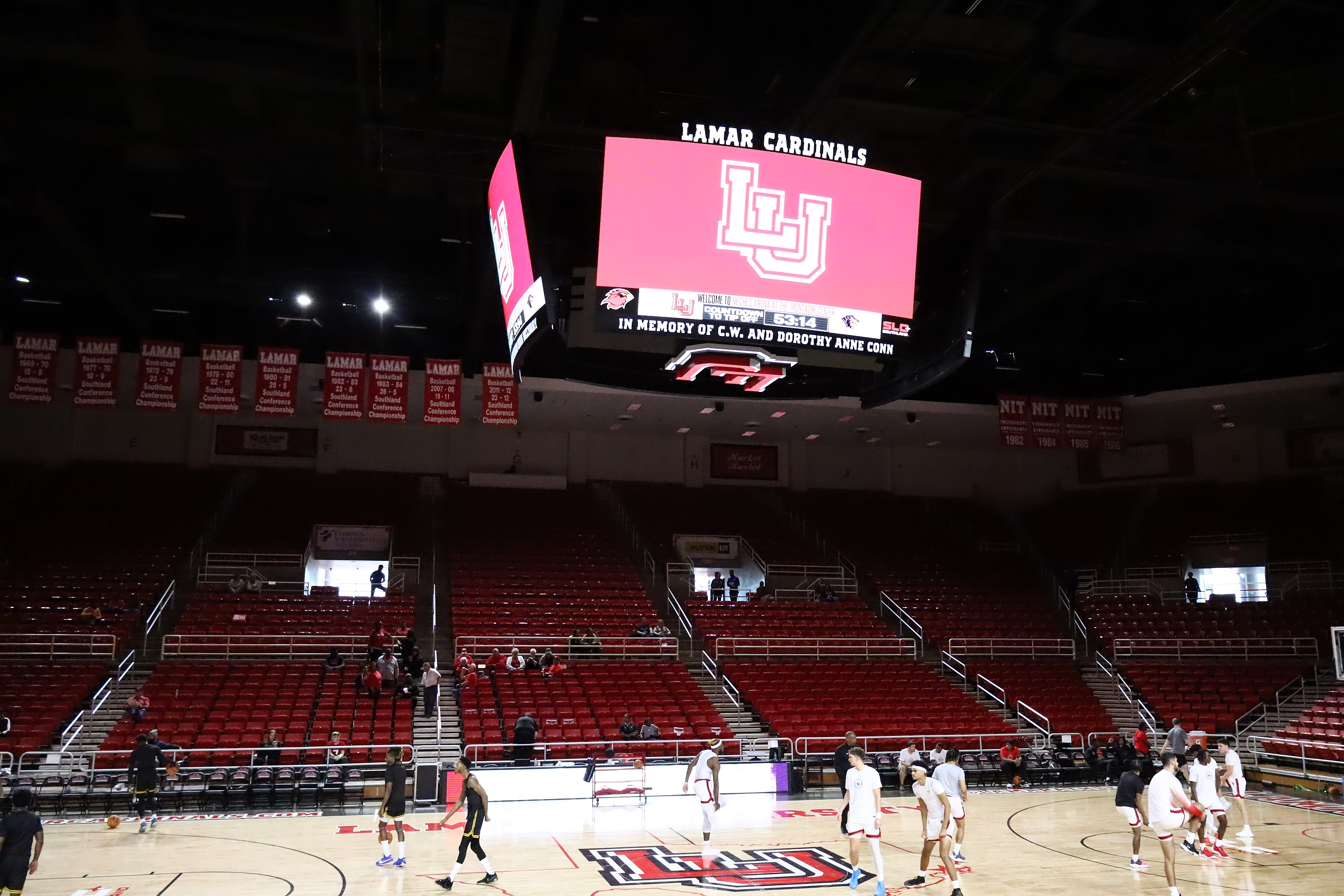
Neches Federal Credit Union Arena at the Montagne Center (Lamar)

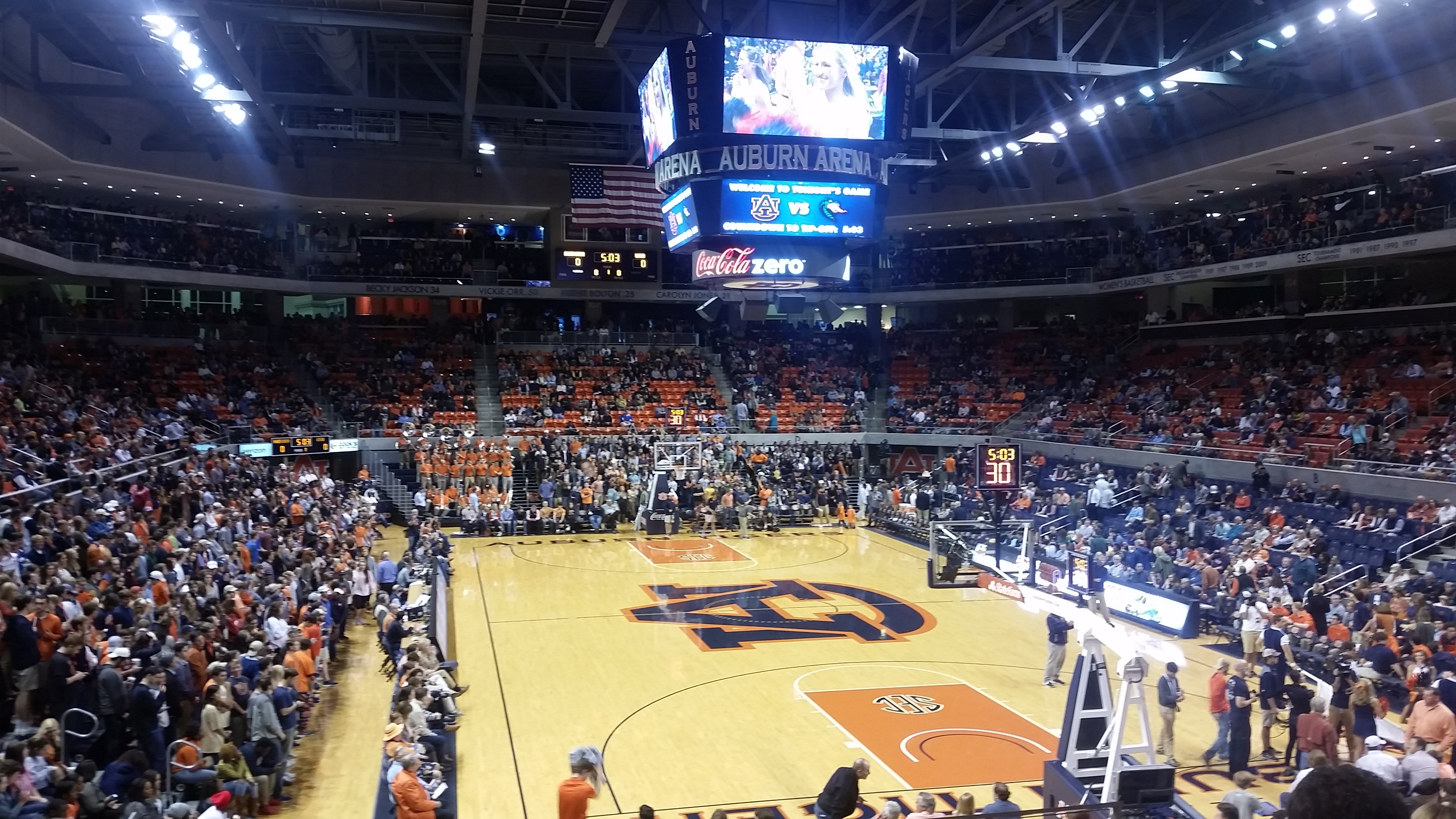
Neville Arena (Auburn)

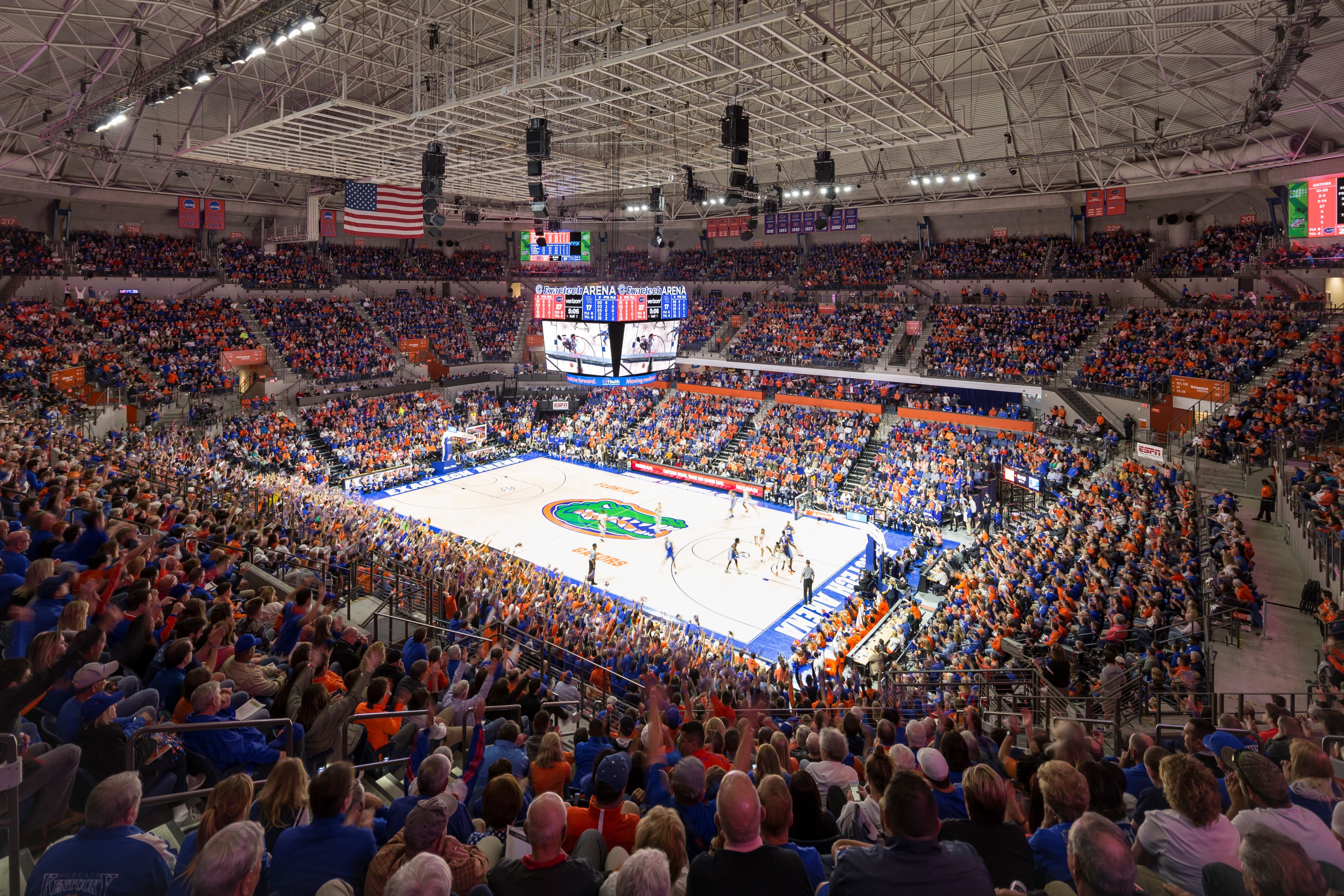
O'Connell Center (Florida)

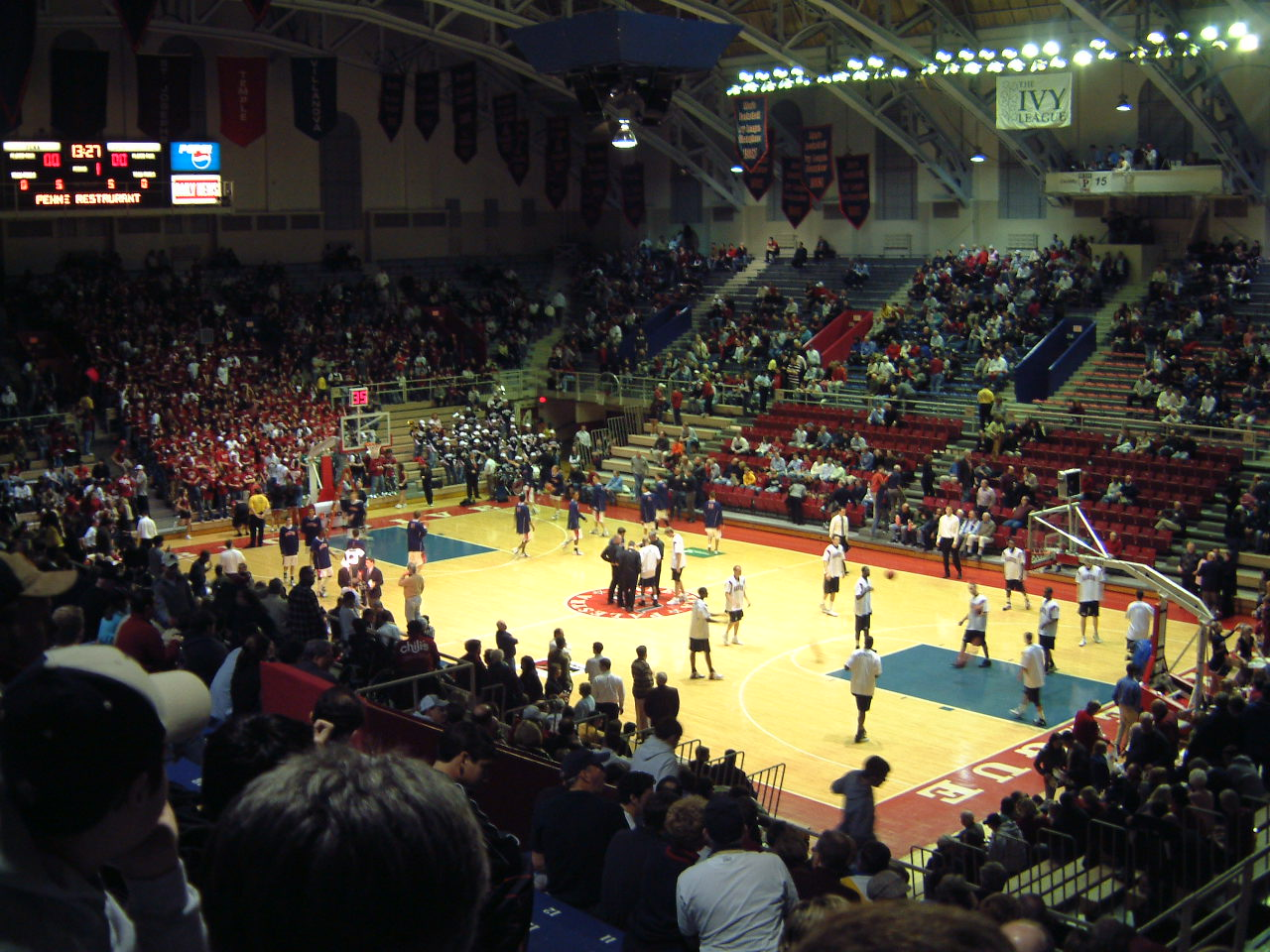
Palestra (Penn)

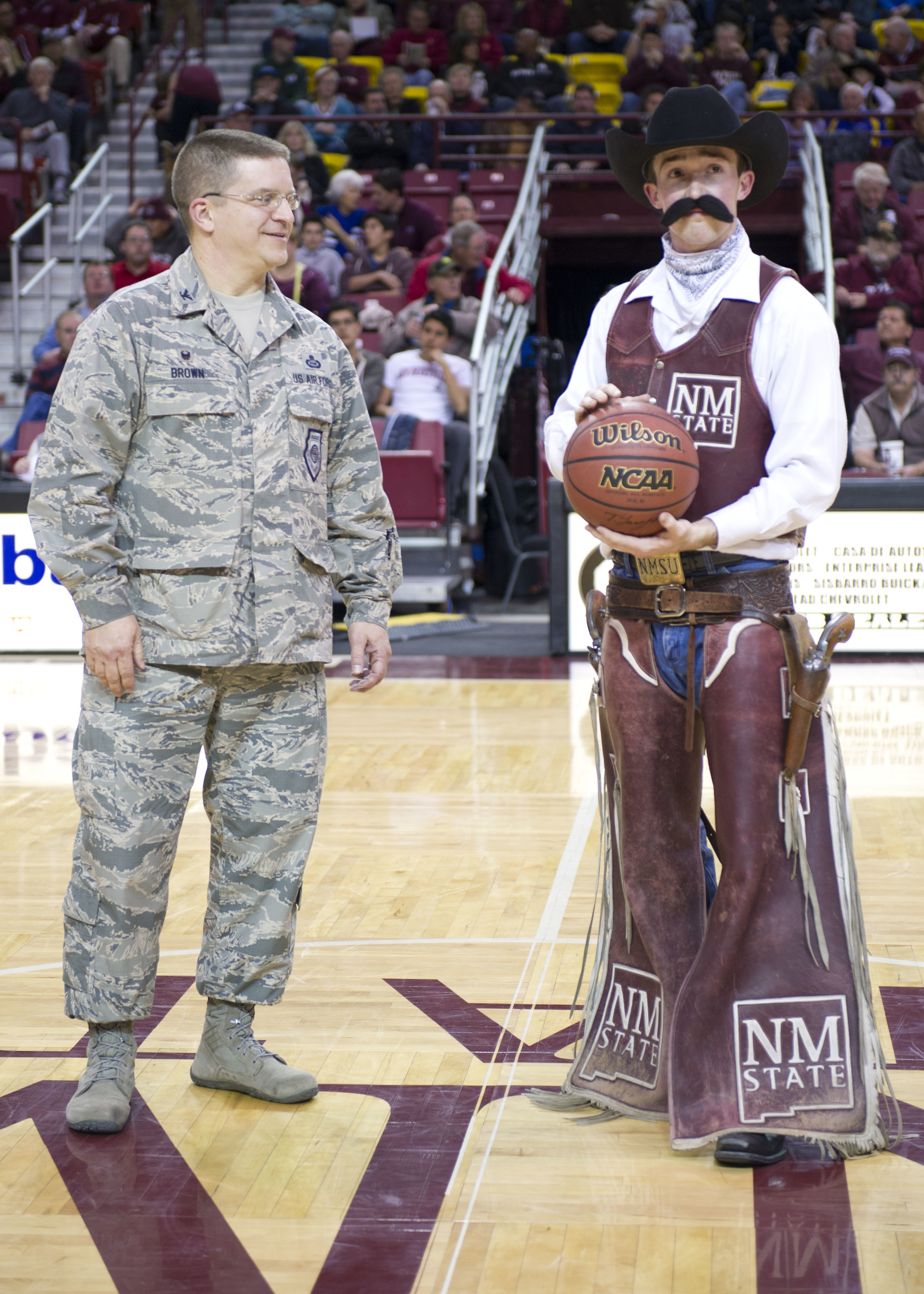
Pan American Center (New Mexico State)

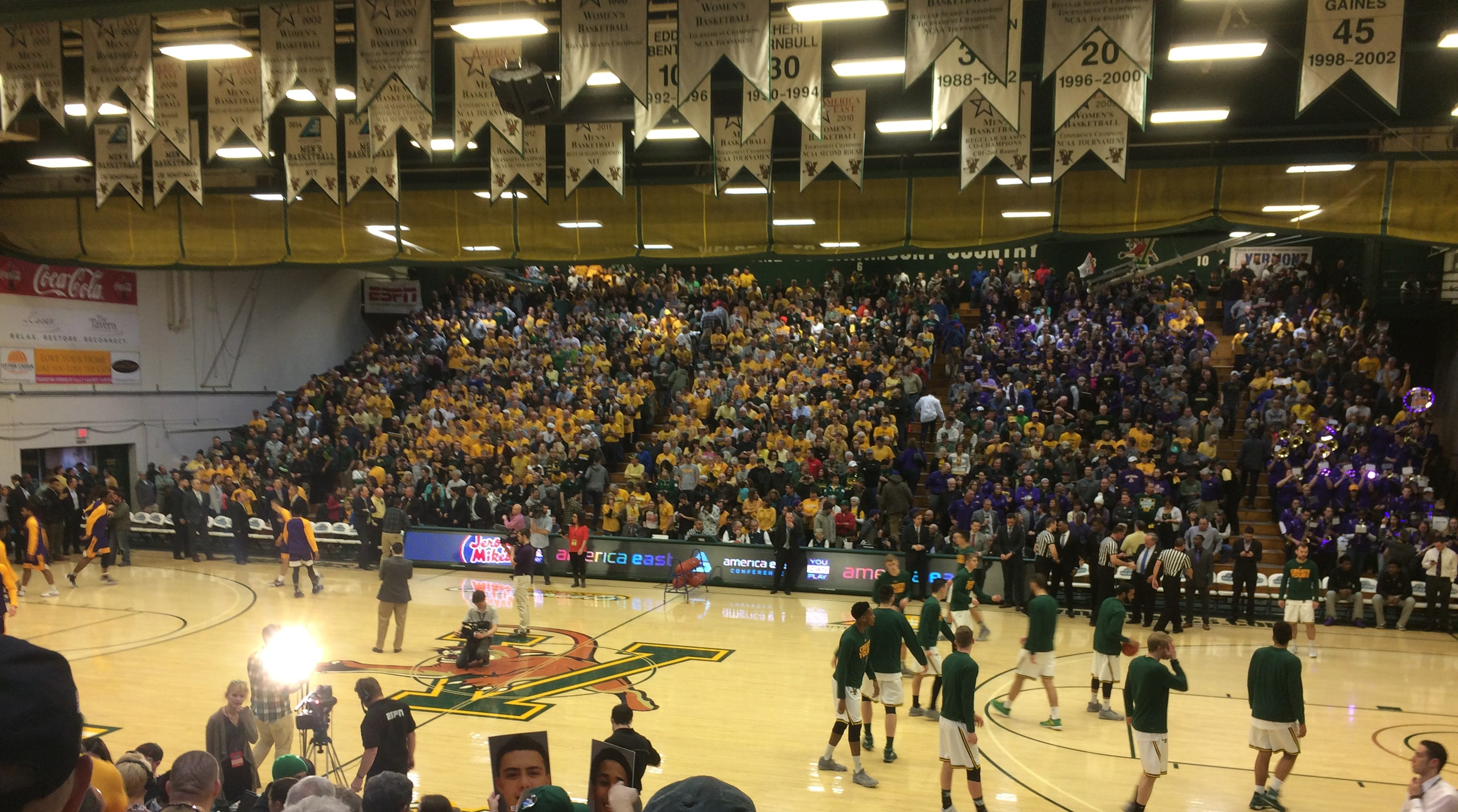
Patrick Gym (Vermont)

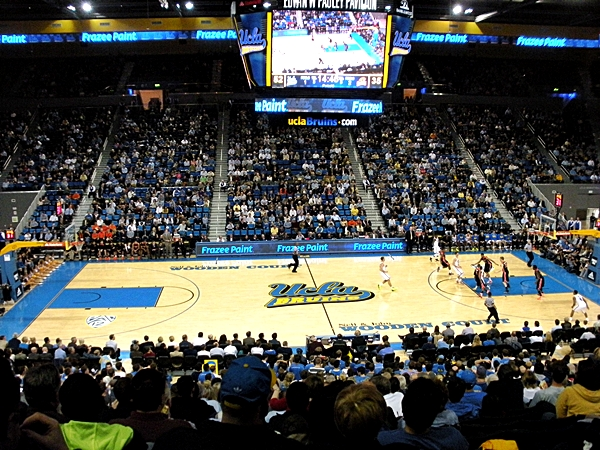
Pauley Pavilion (UCLA)

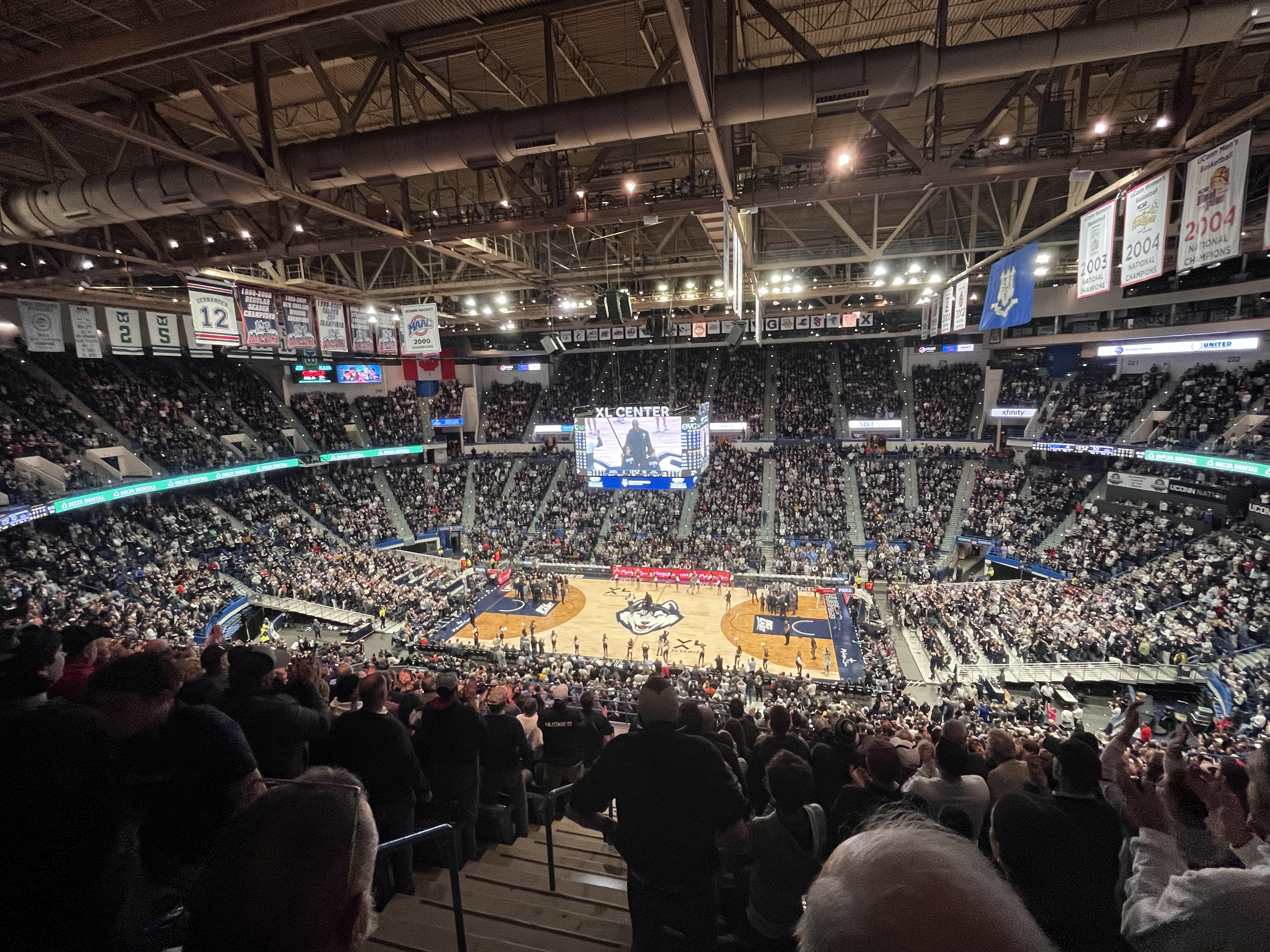
PeoplesBank Arena (UConn)

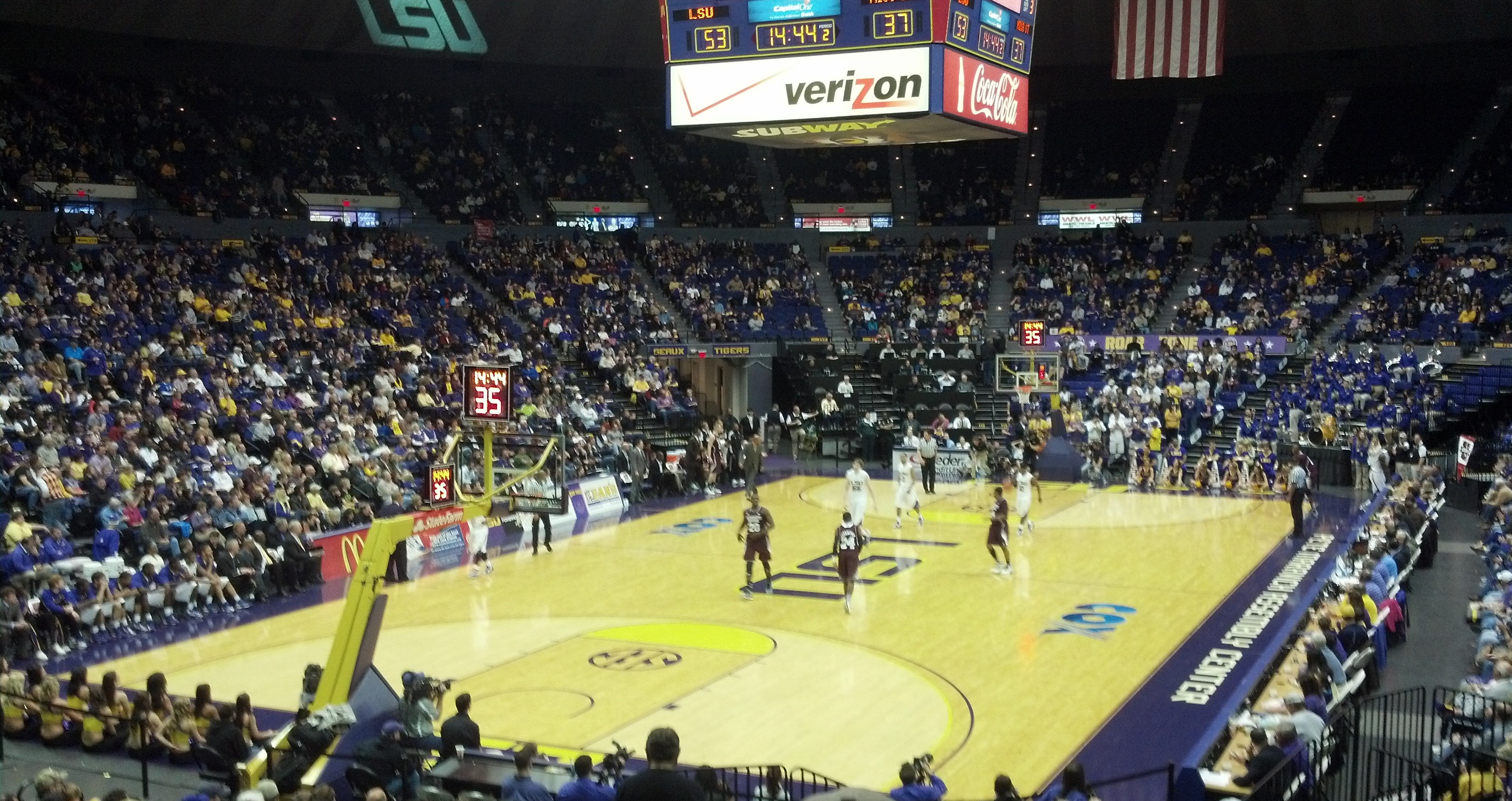
Pete Maravich Assembly Center (LSU)

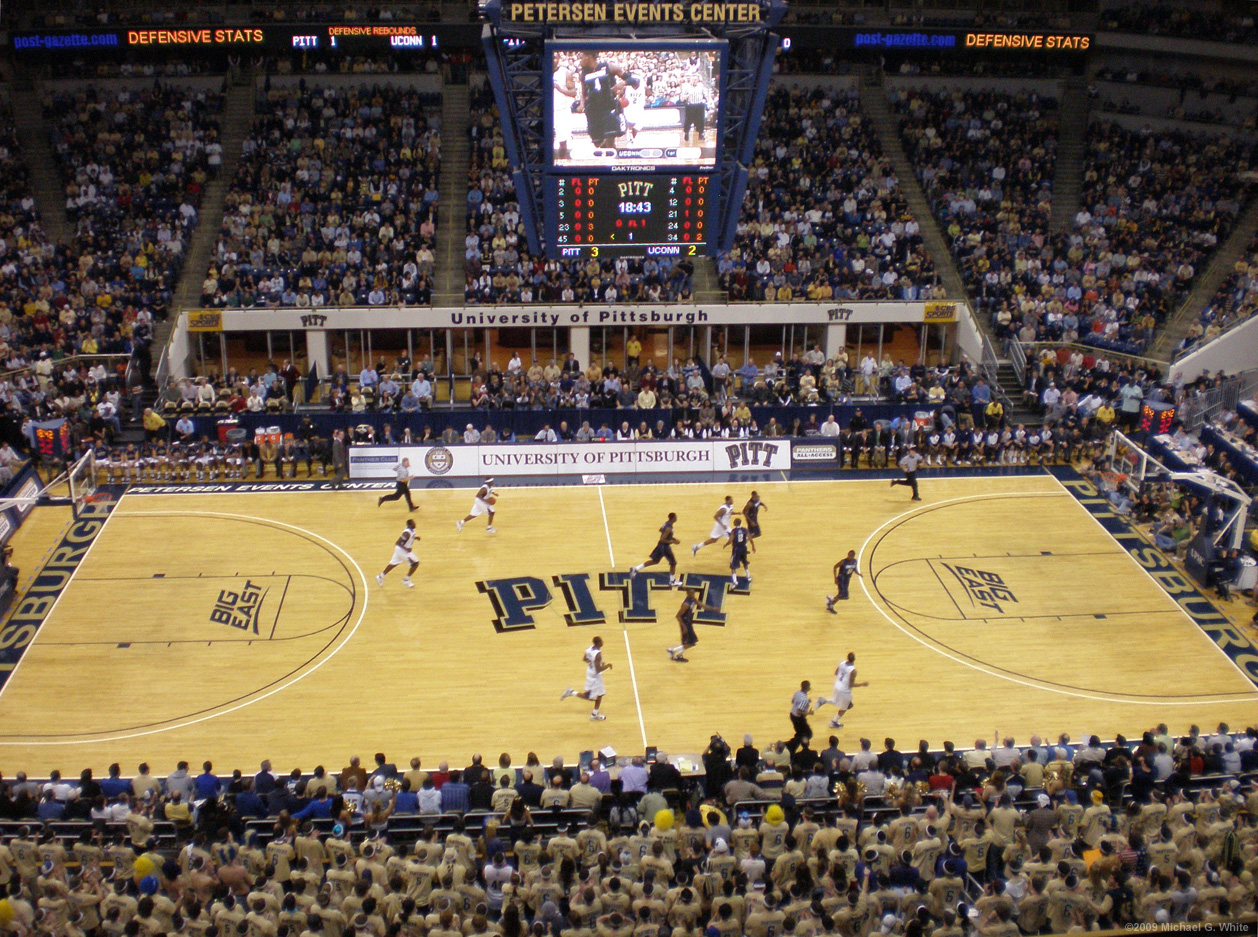
Petersen Events Center (Pittsburgh)

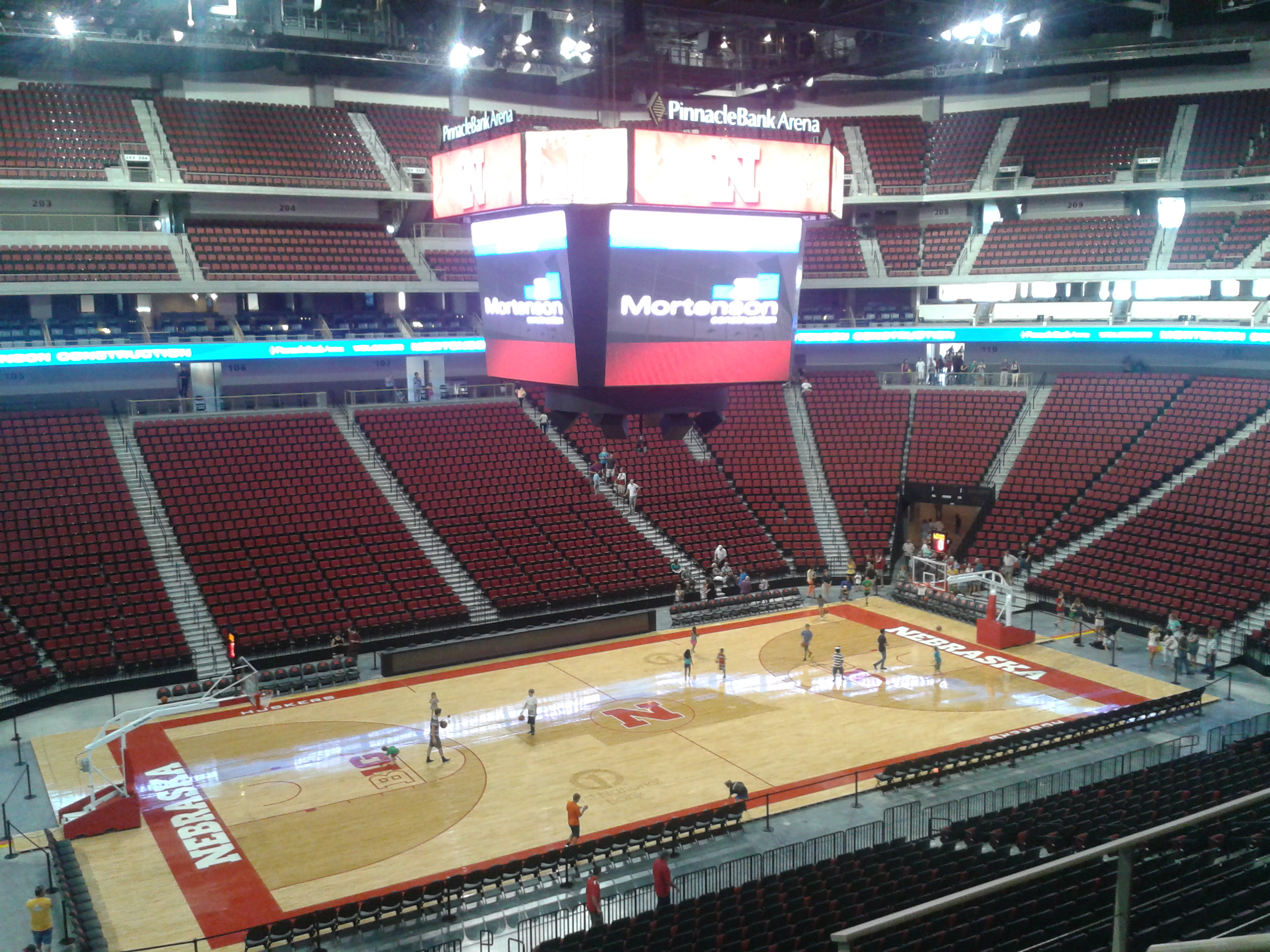
Pinnacle Bank Arena (Nebraska)

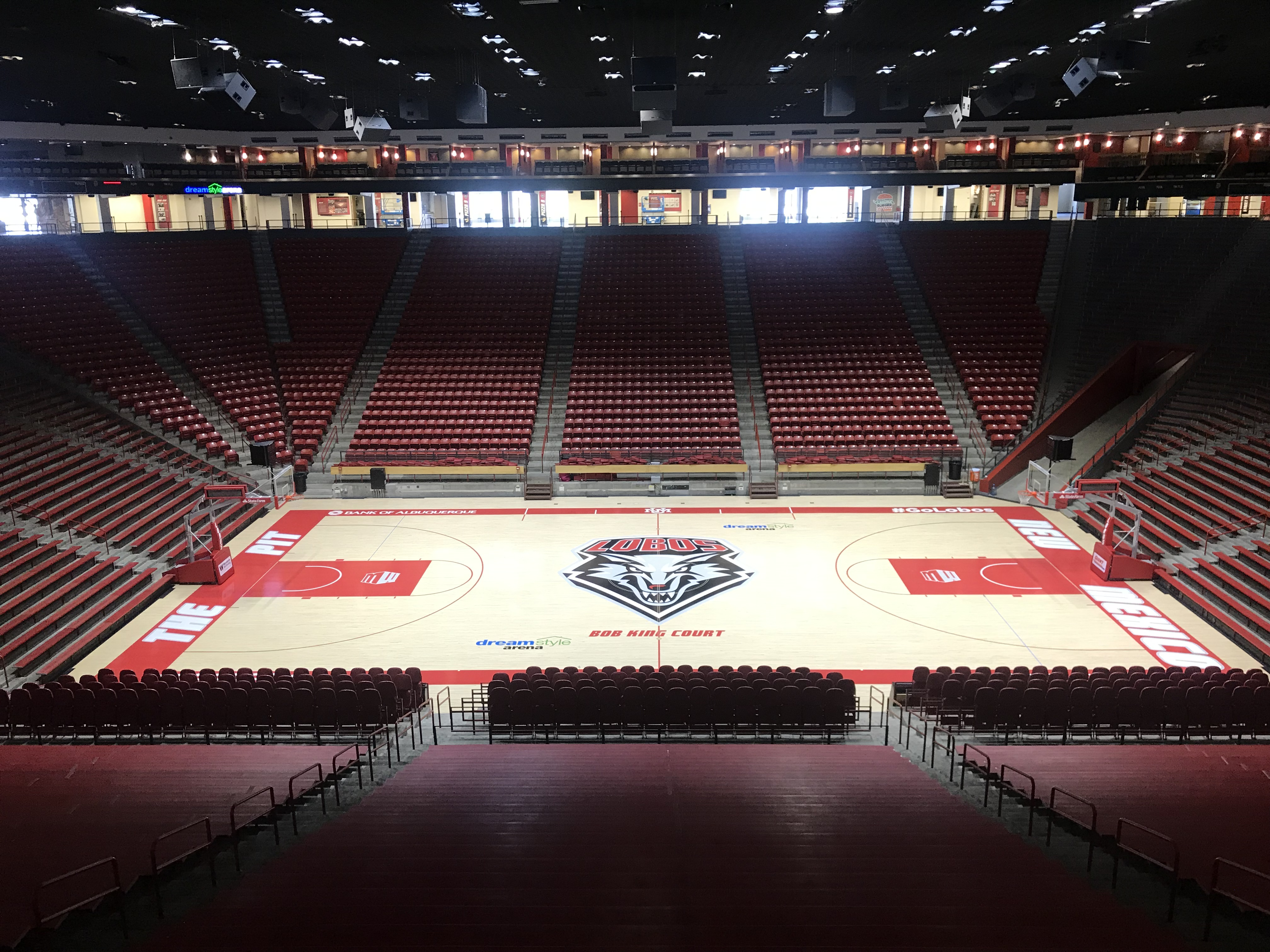
The Pit (arena) (New Mexico)

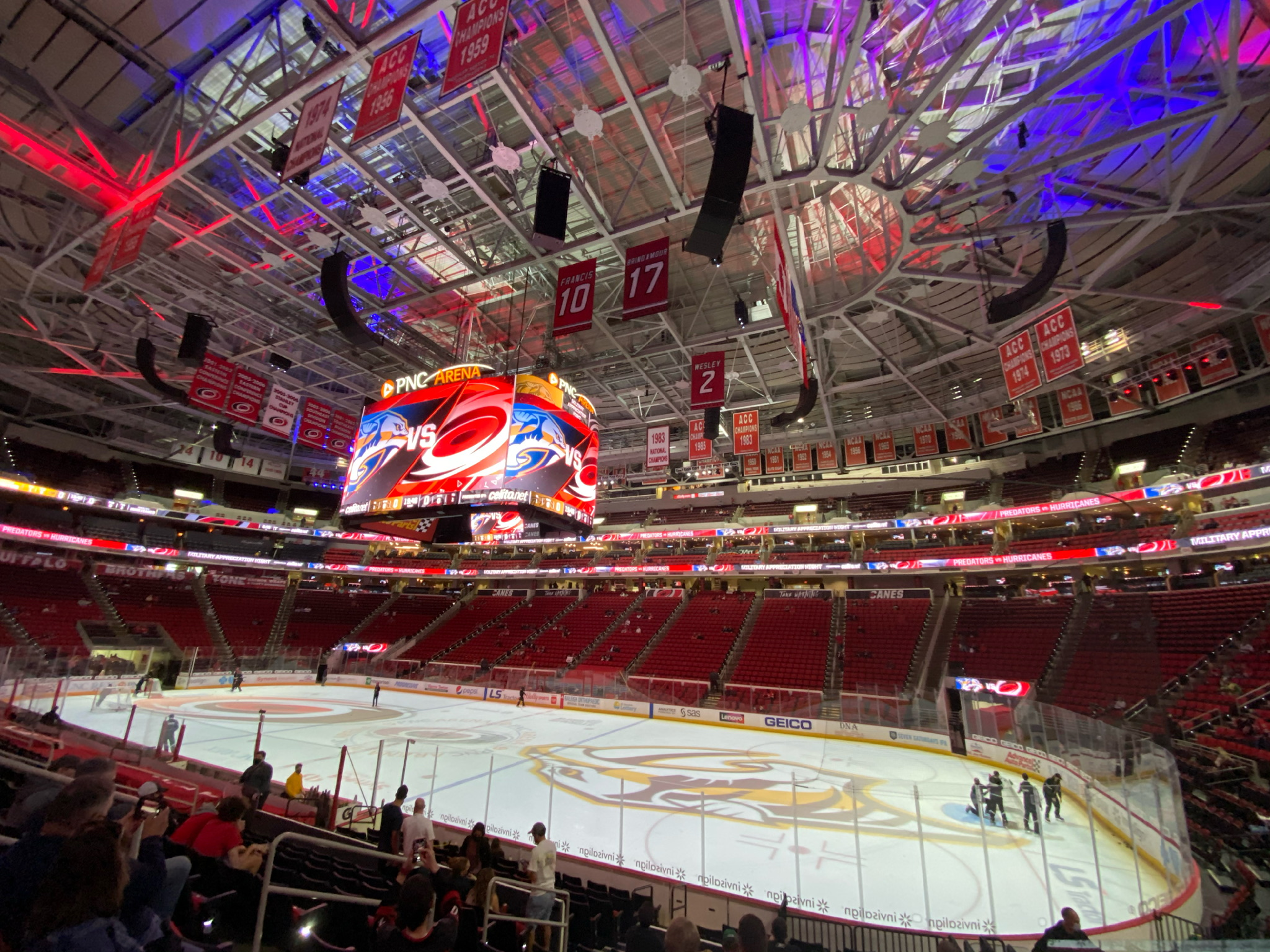
PNC Arena (NC State)

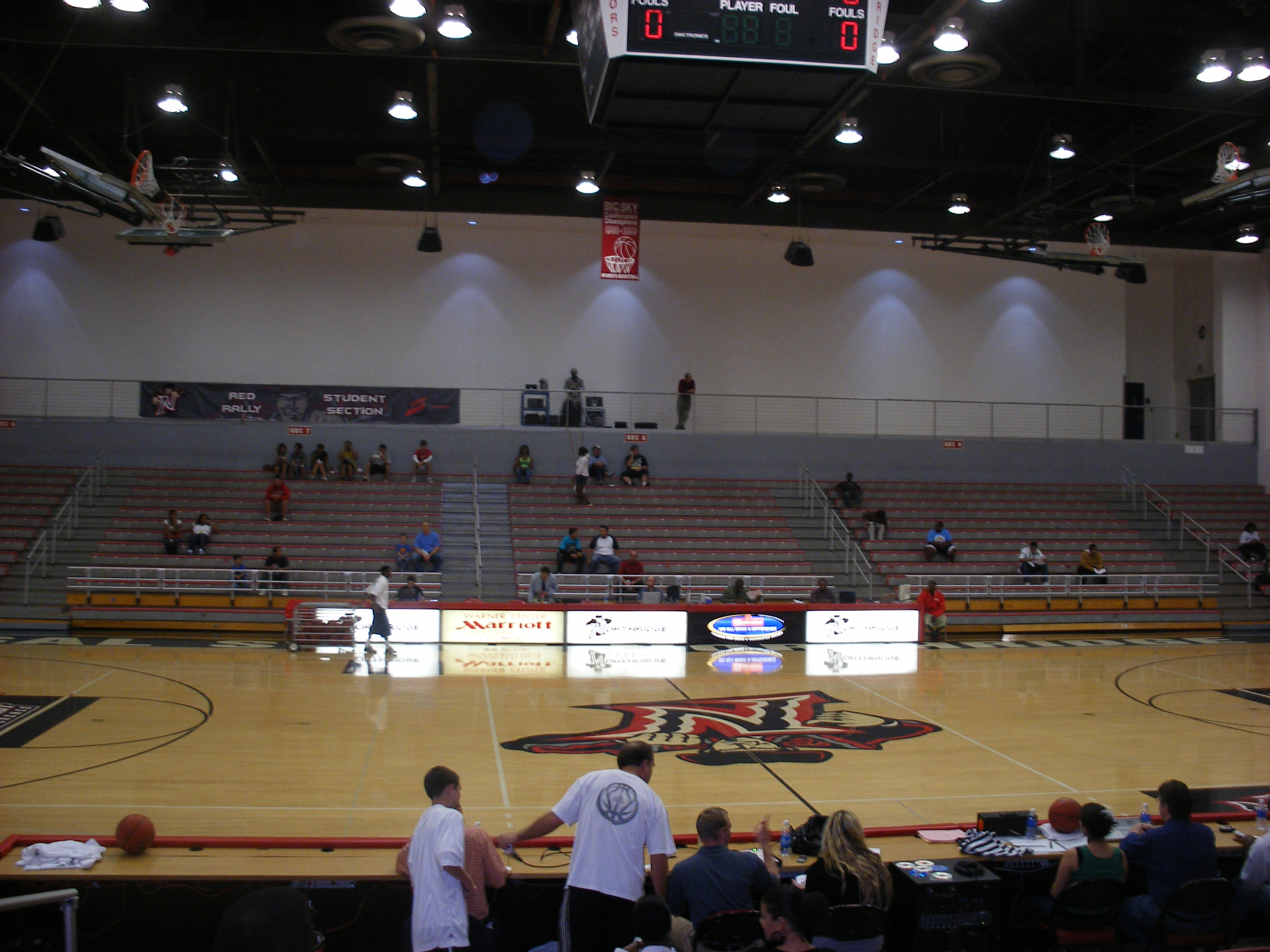
Premier America Credit Union Arena (Cal State Northridge)

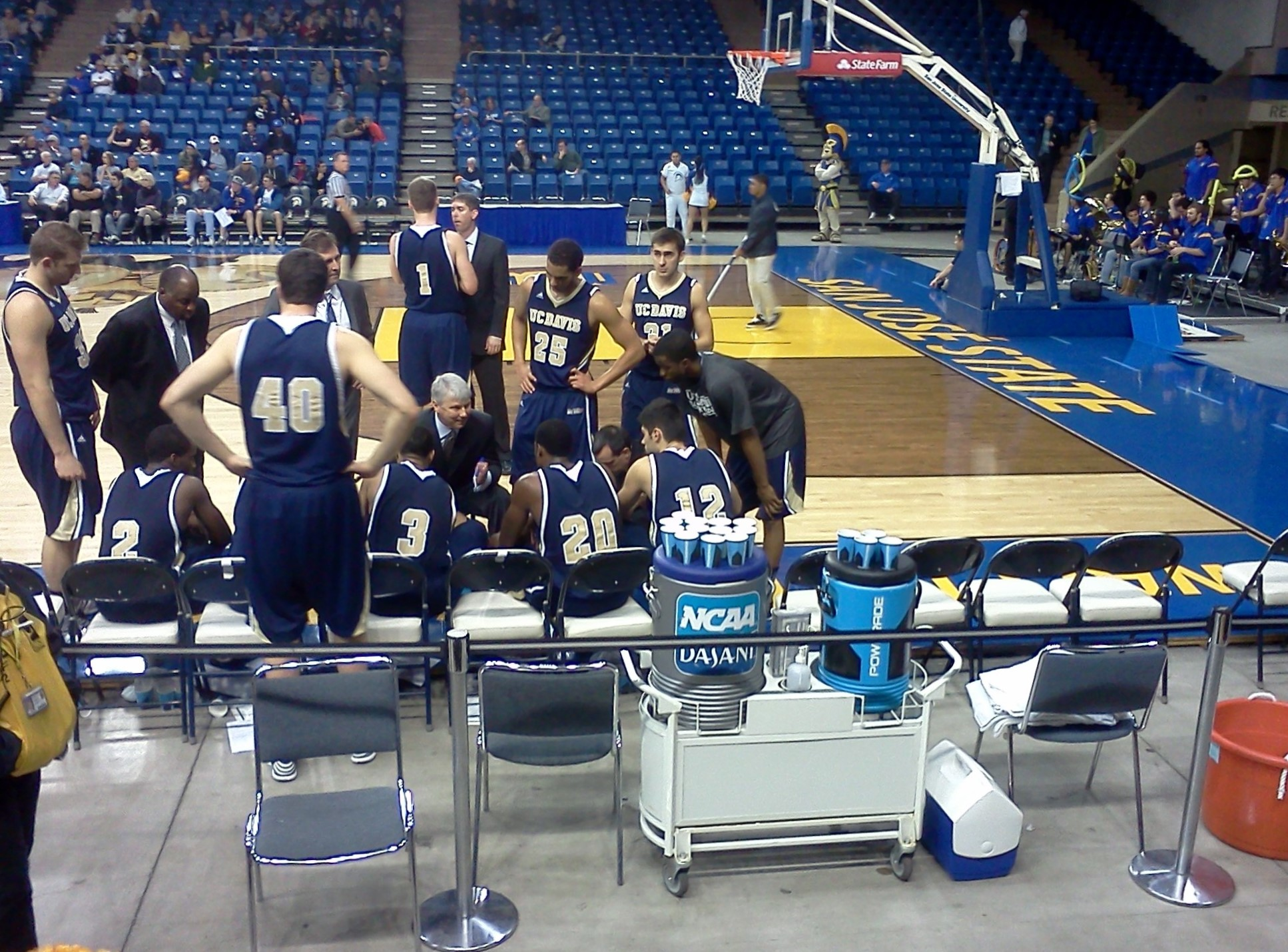
Provident Credit Union Event Center (San Jose State)

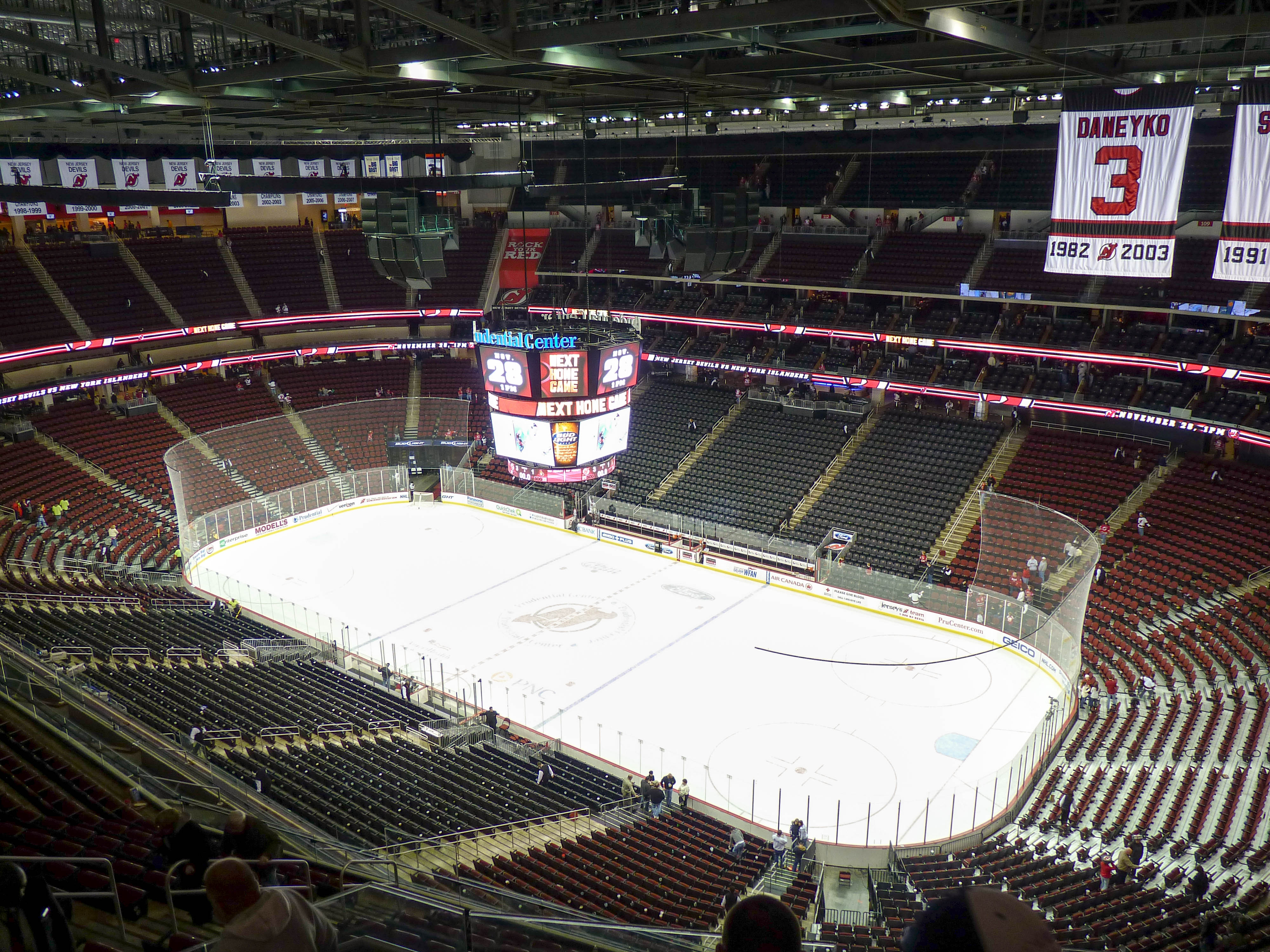
Prudential Center (Seton Hall)

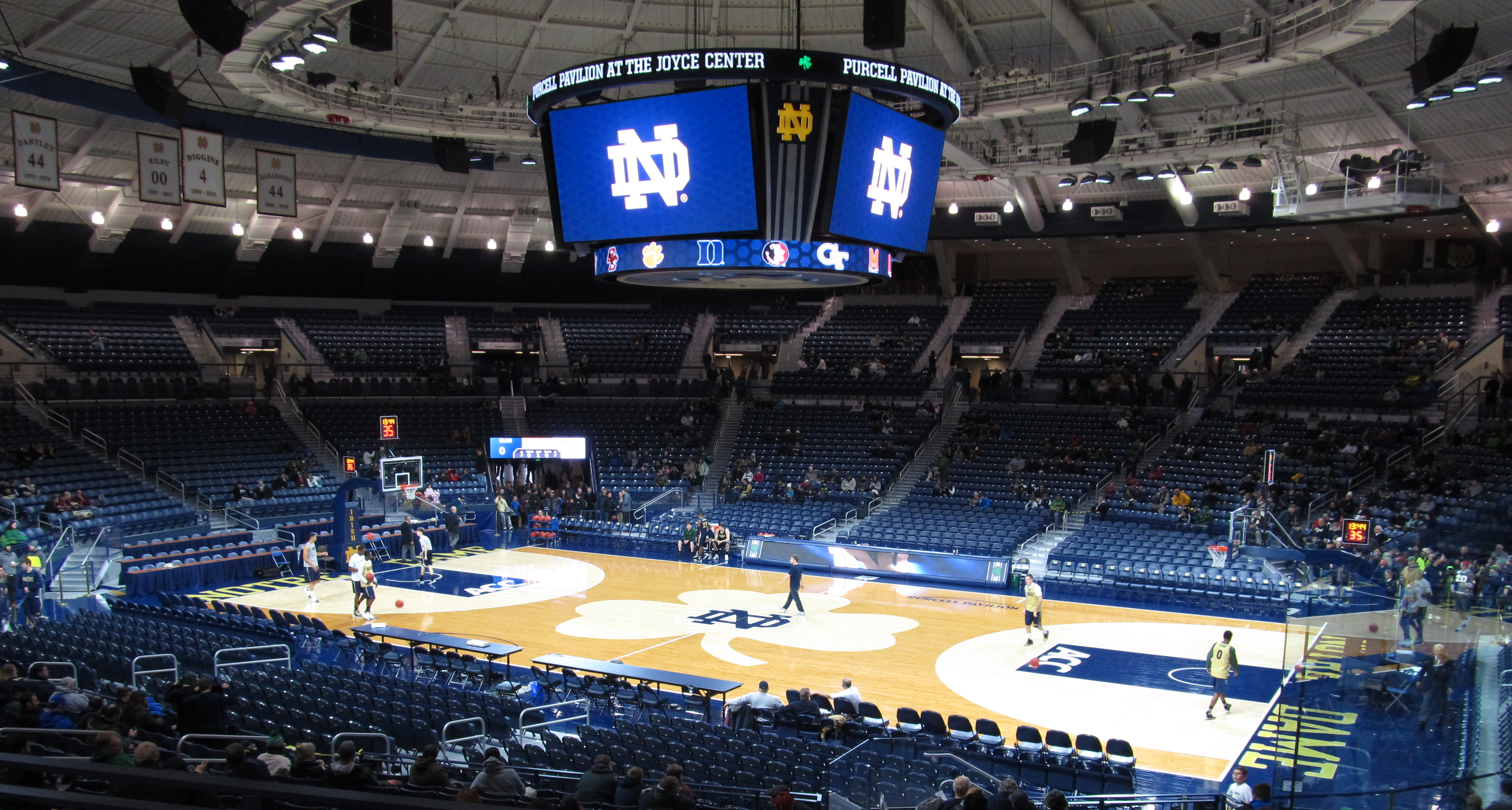
Purcell Pavilion at Edmund P. Joyce Center (Notre Dame)

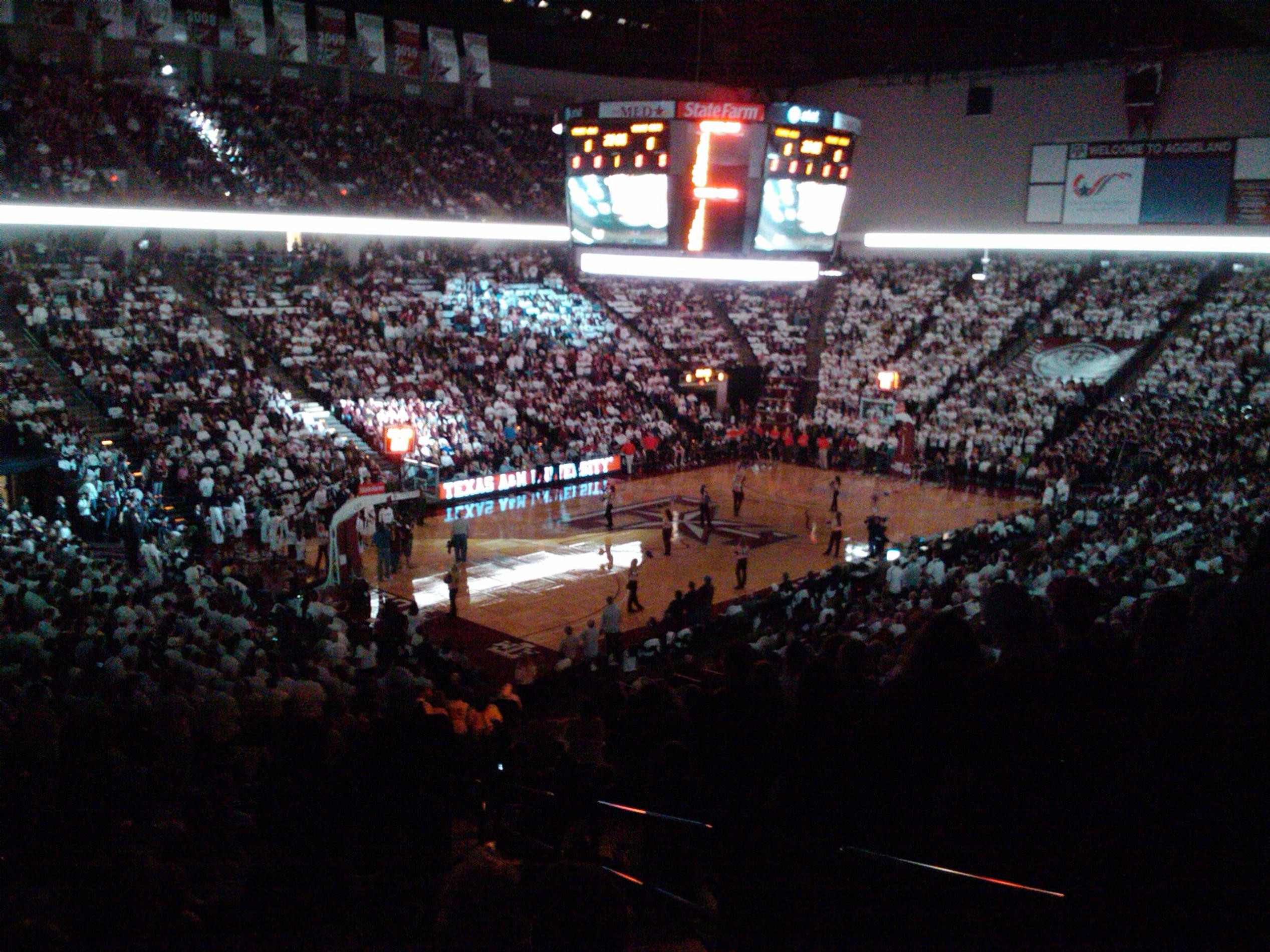
Reed Arena (Texas A&M)

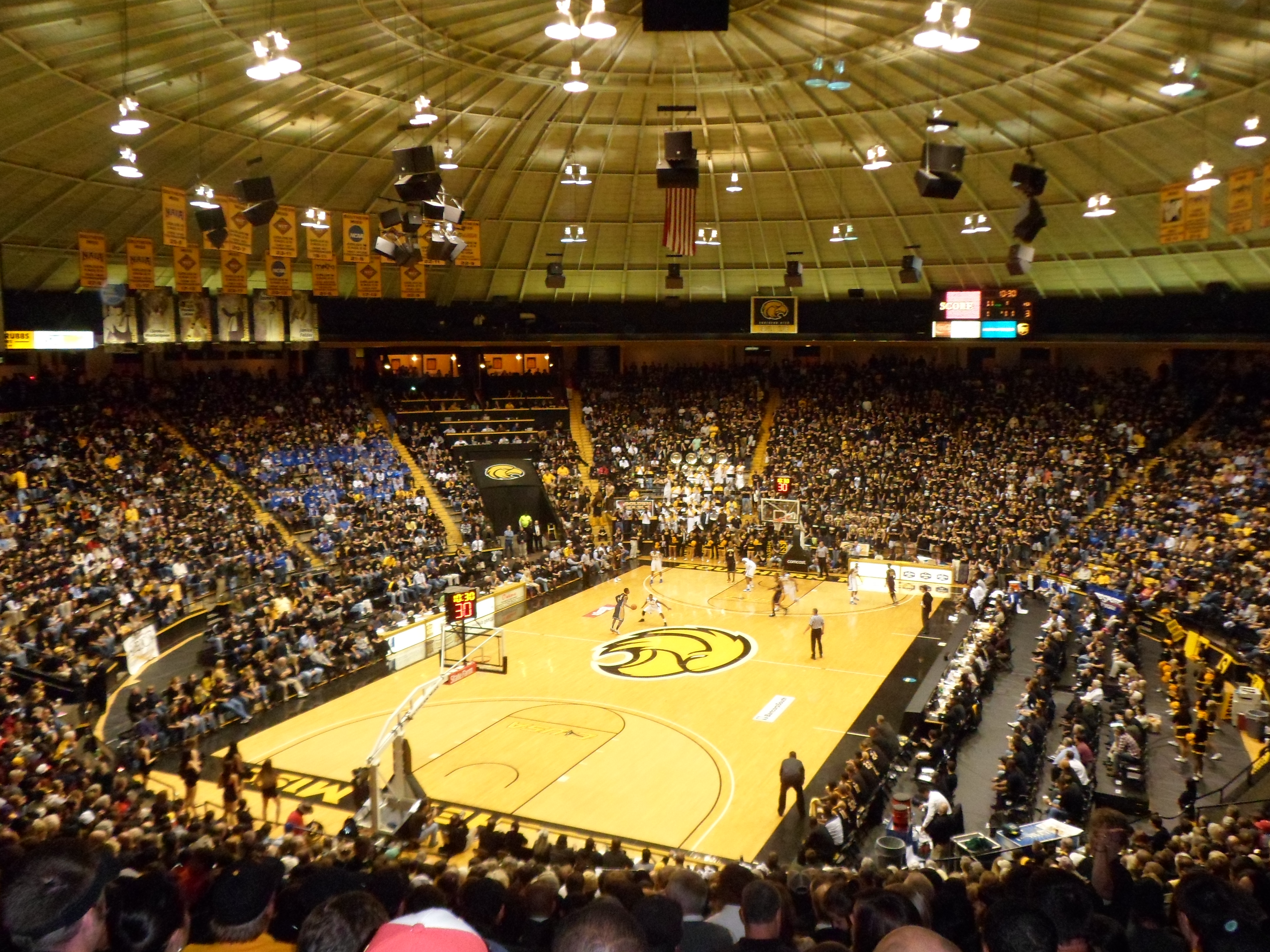
Reed Green Coliseum (Southern Miss)

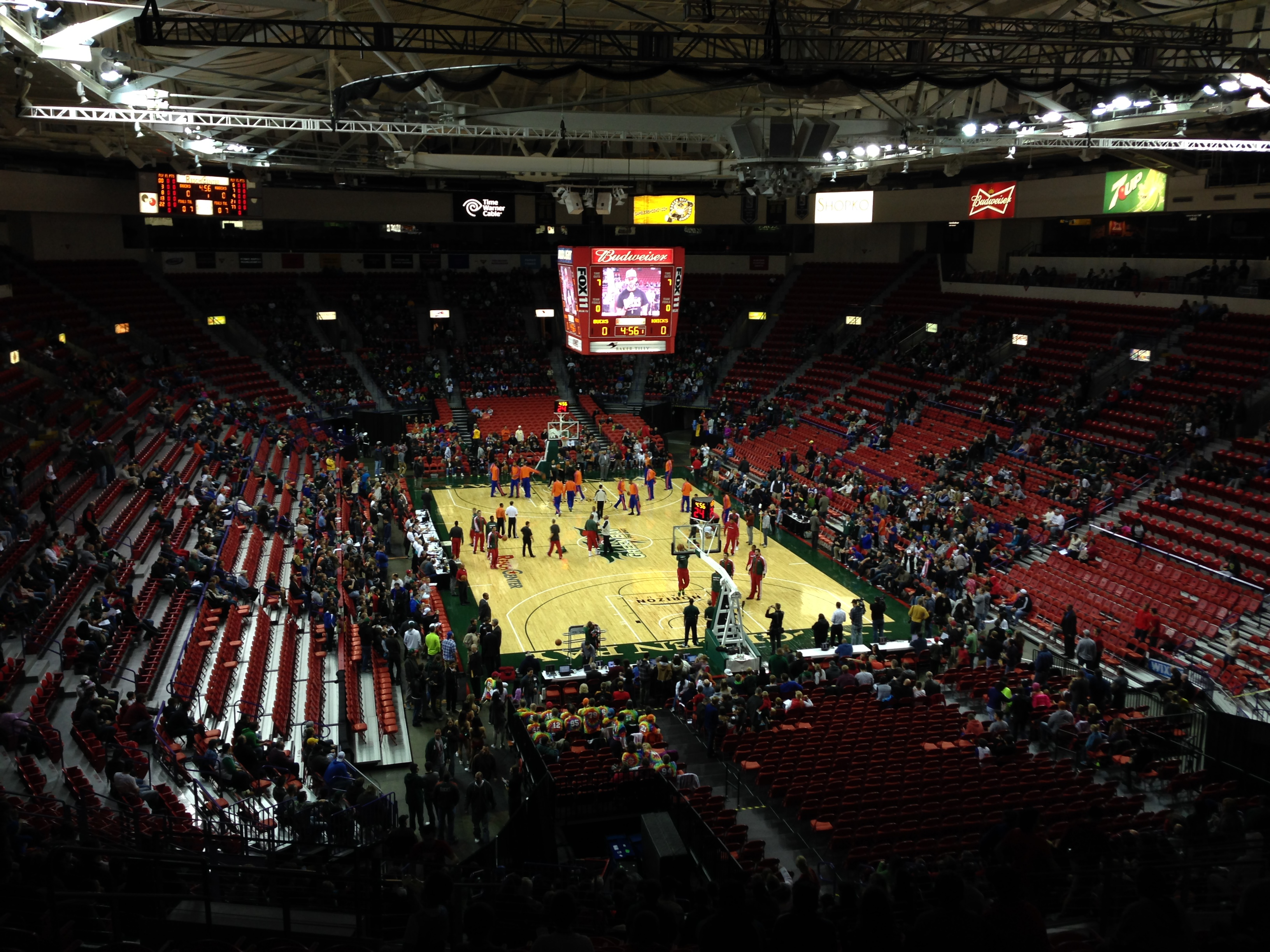
Resch Center (Green Bay)

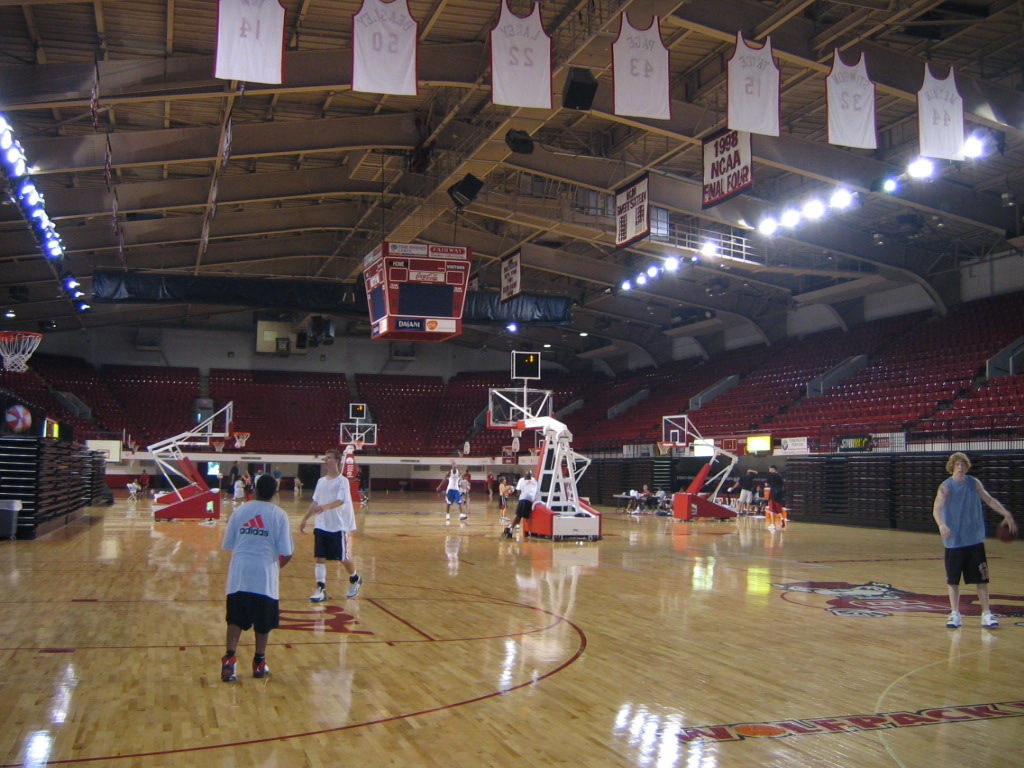
Reynolds Coliseum (NC State)

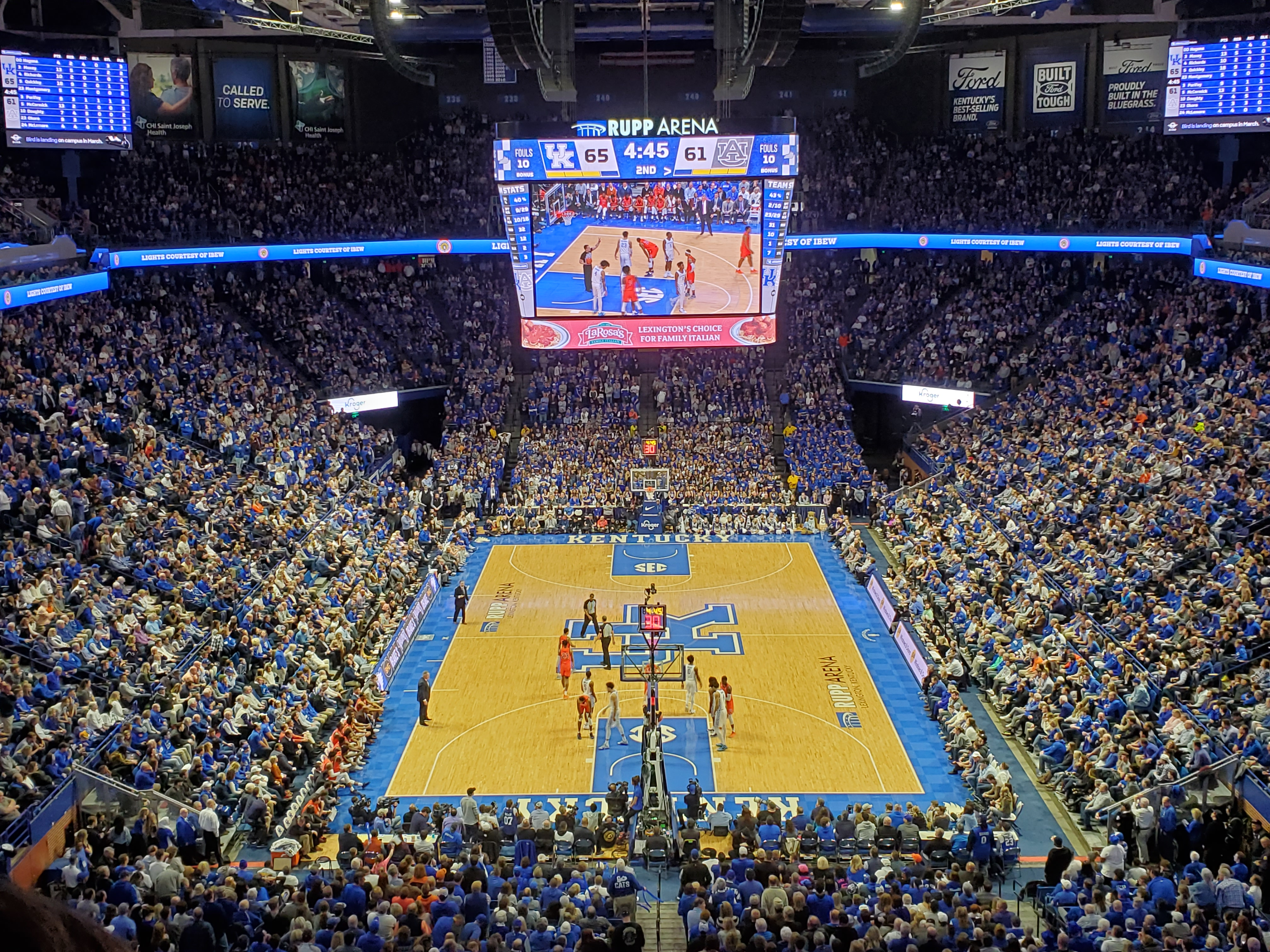
Rupp Arena (Kentucky)

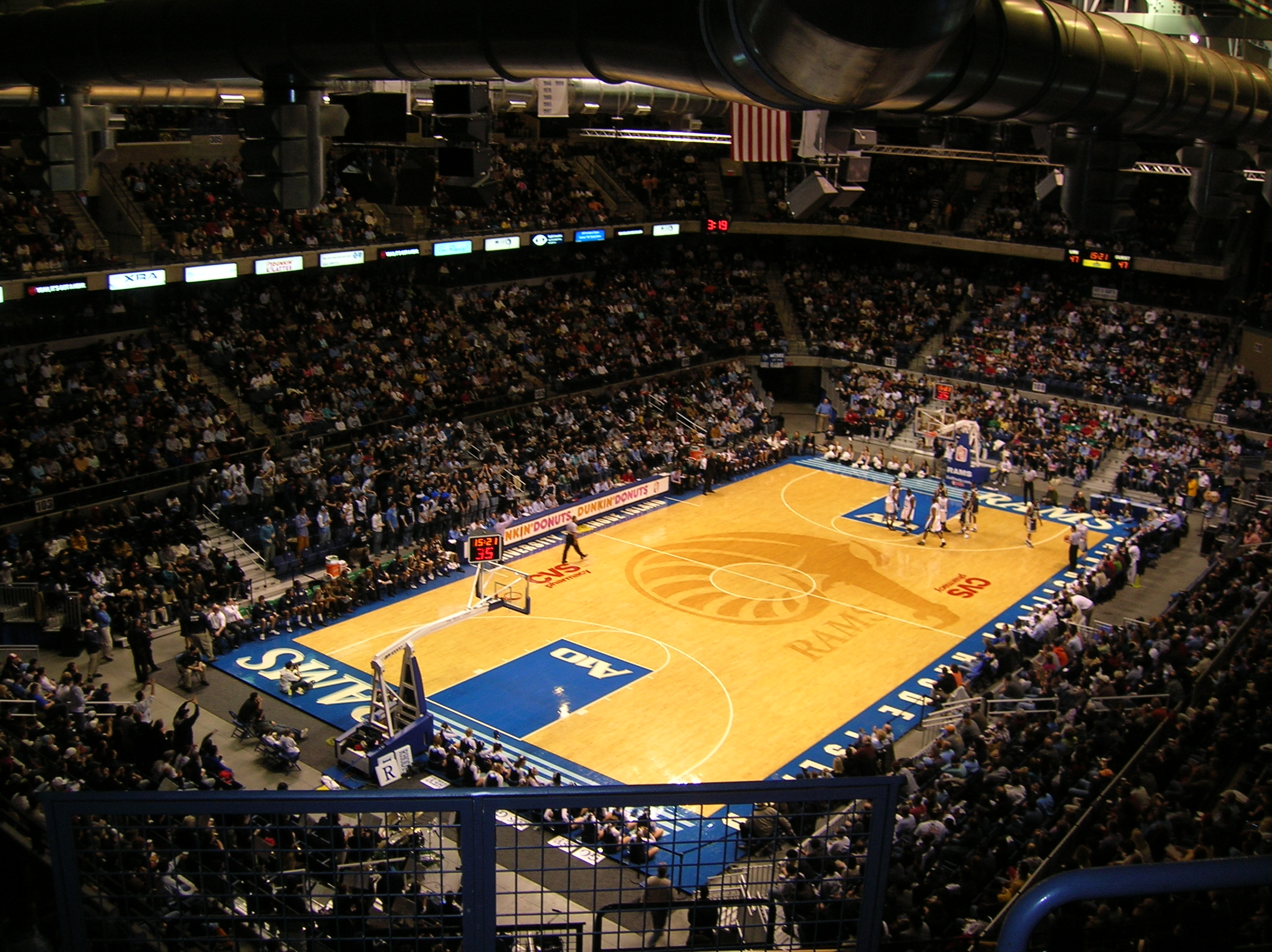
Ryan Center (Rhode Island)

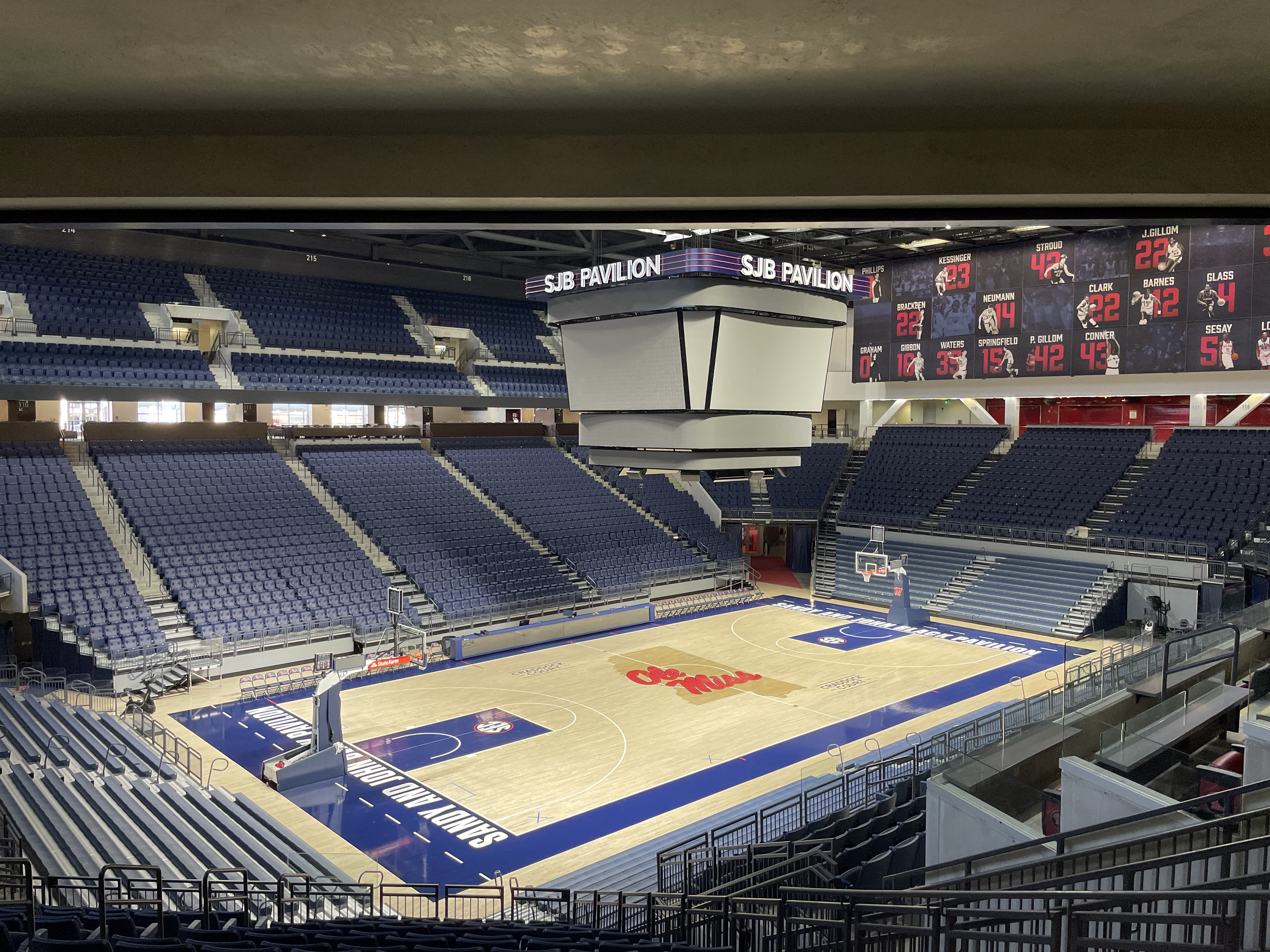
The Sandy and John Black Pavilion at Ole Miss (Ole Miss)

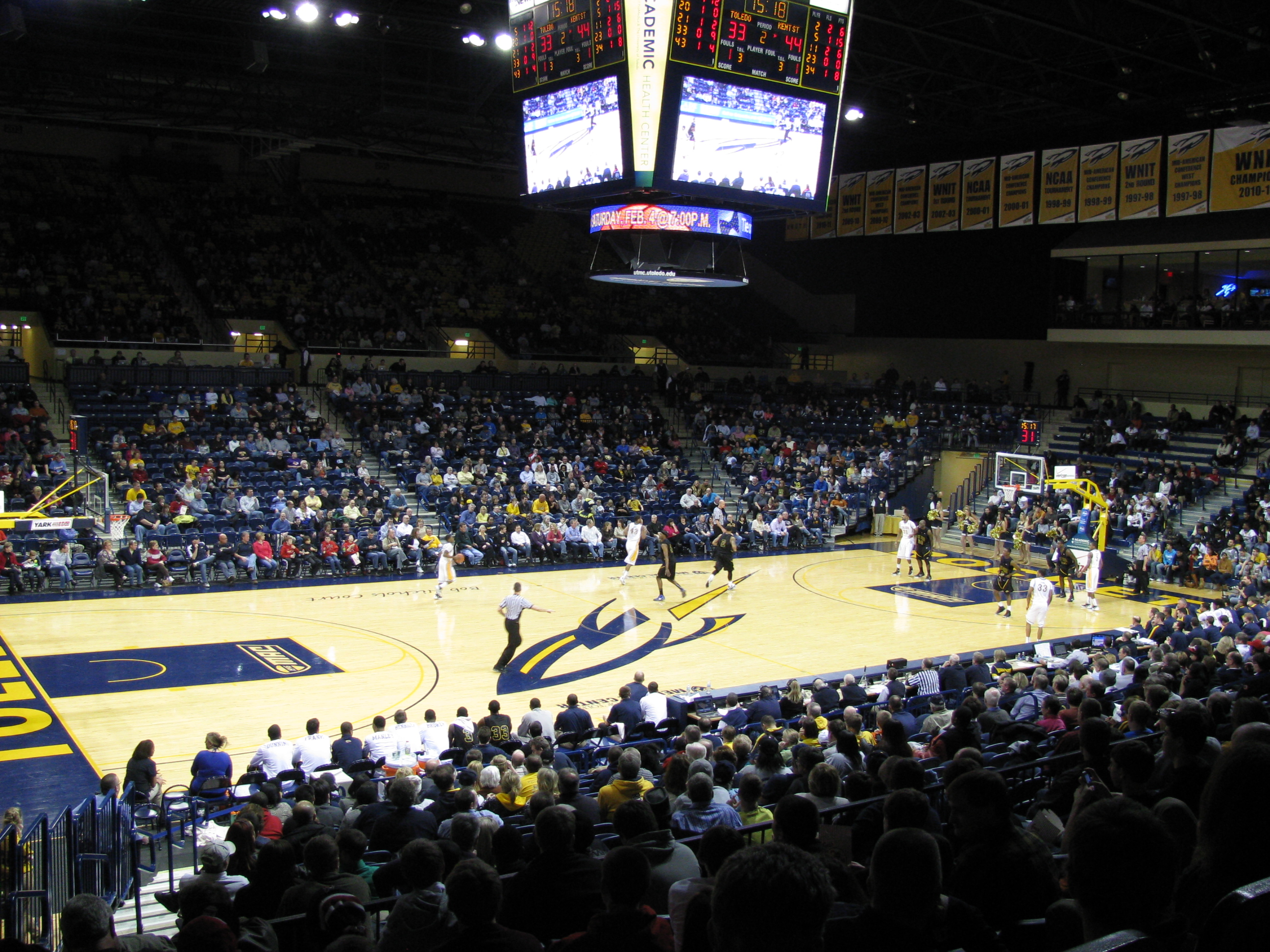
Savage Arena (Toledo)

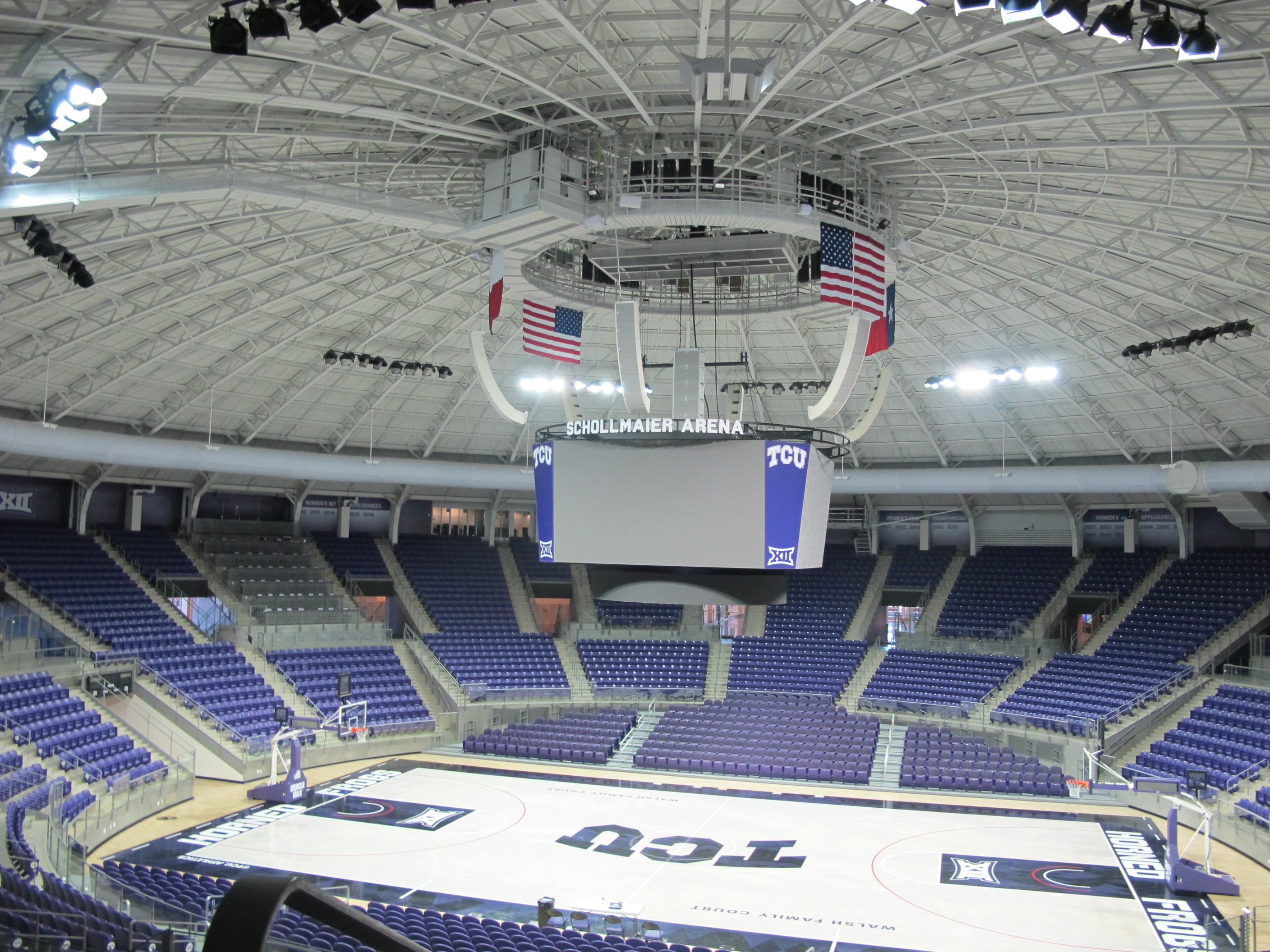
Schollmaier Arena (TCU)

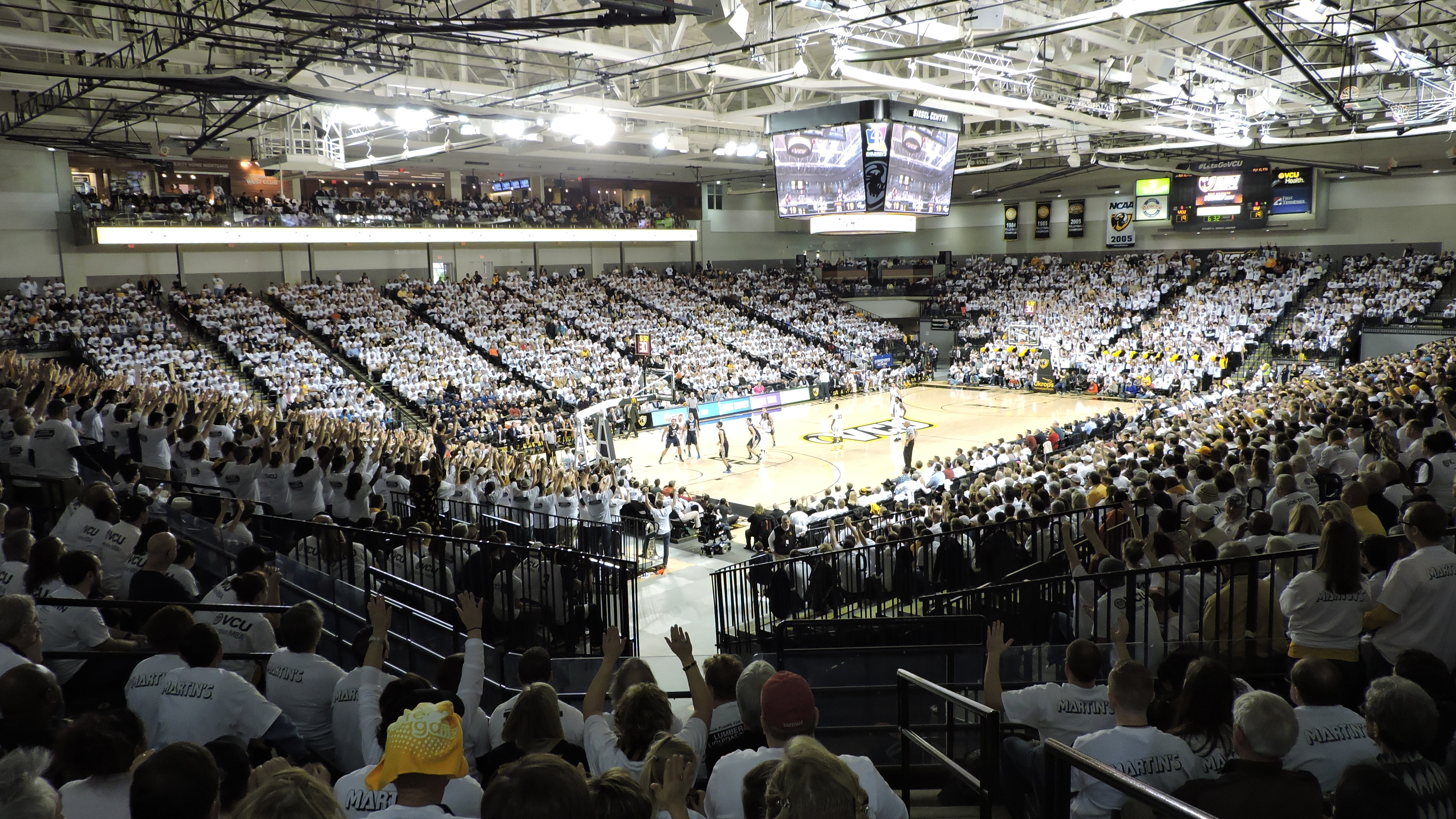
Siegel Center (VCU)

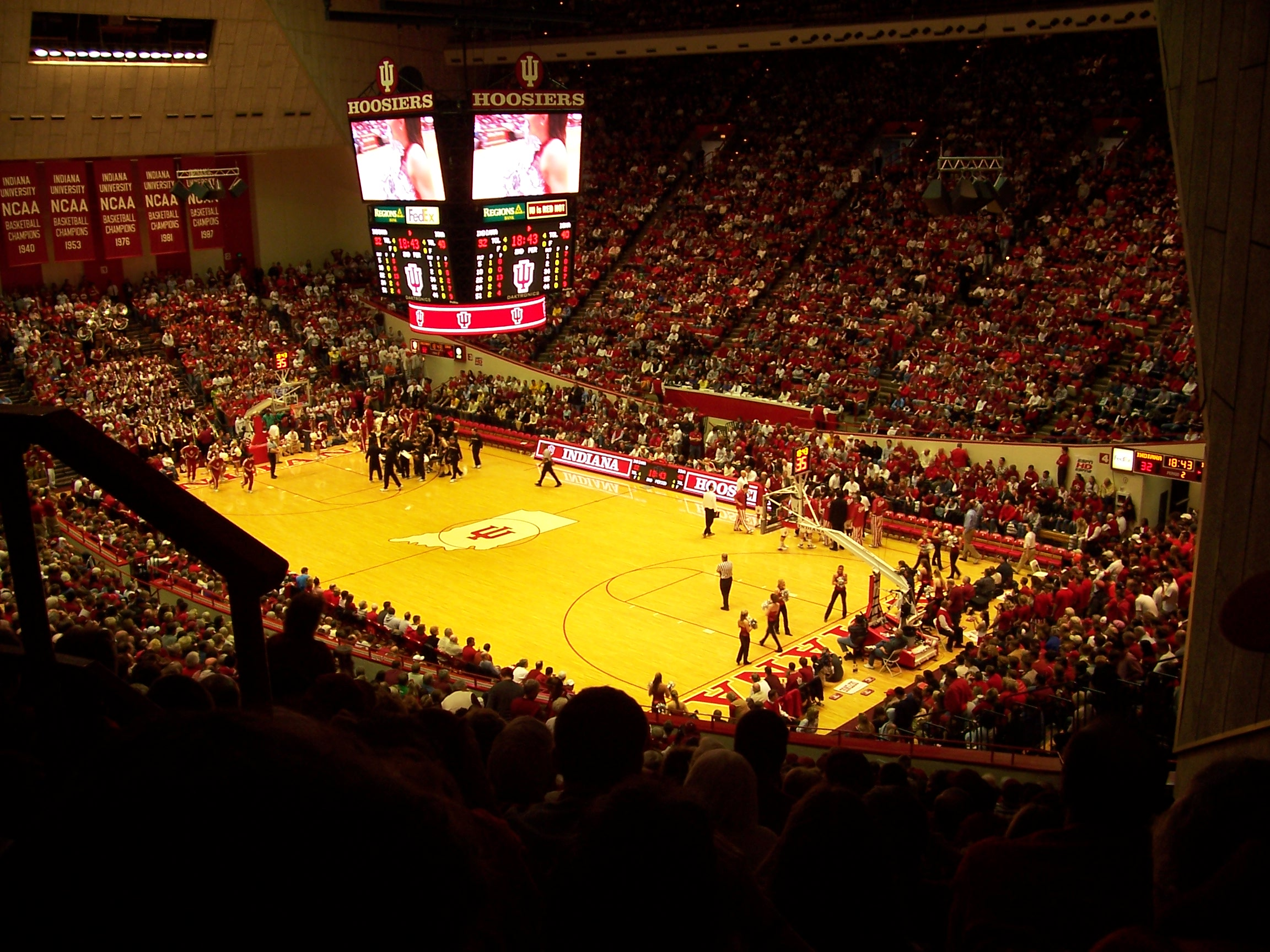
Simon Skjodt Assembly Hall (Indiana)

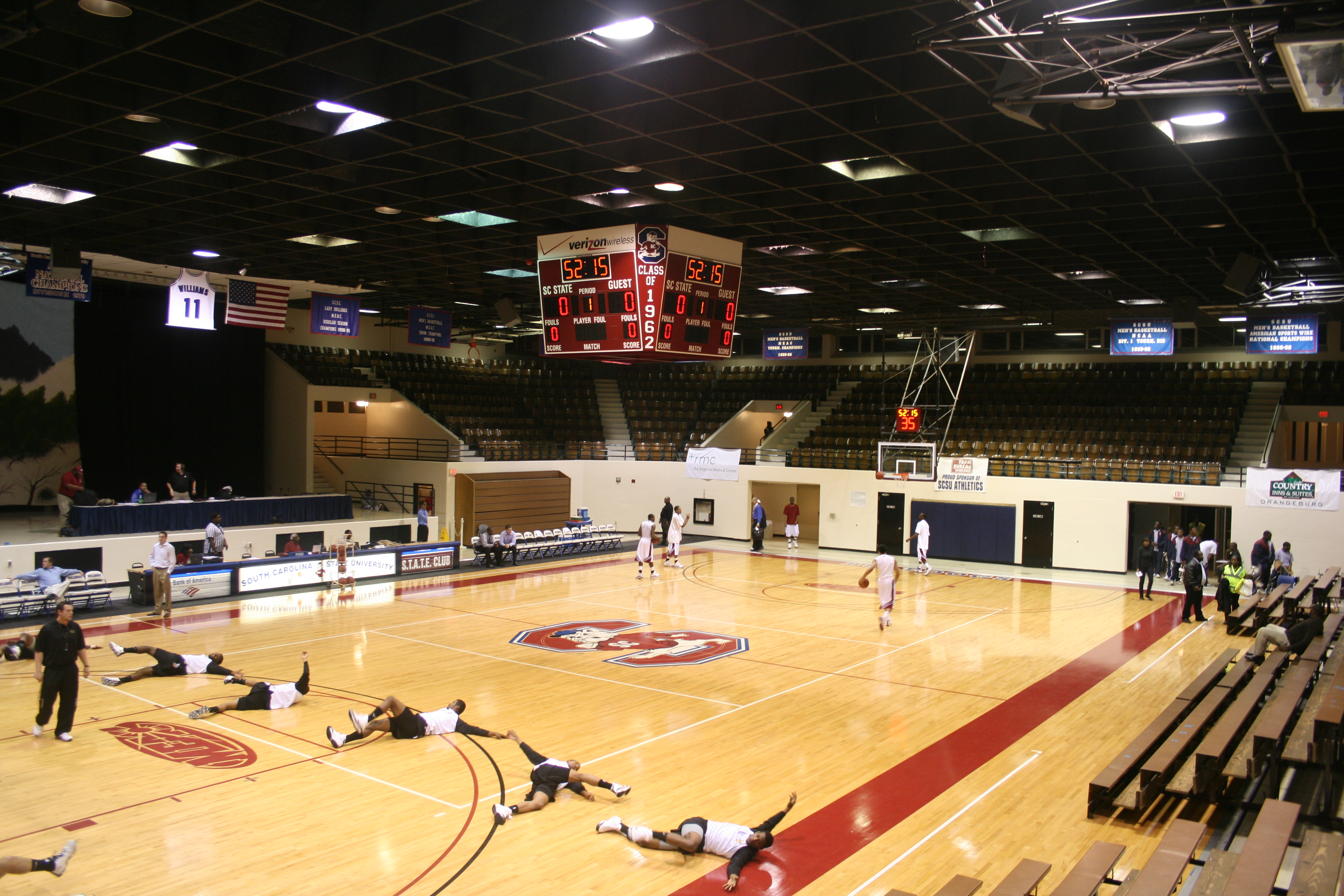
SHM Memorial Center (South Carolina State)

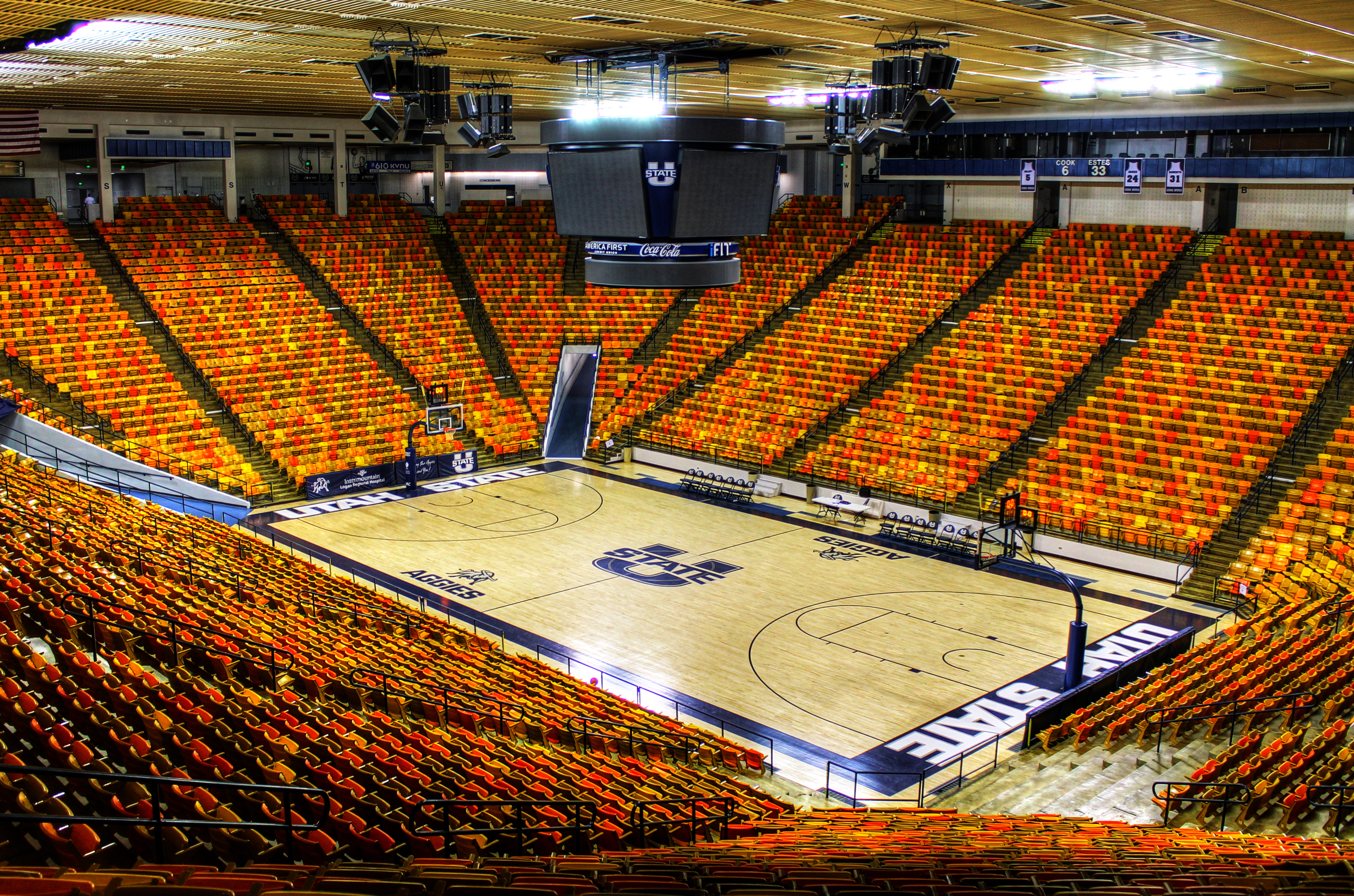
Smith Spectrum (Utah State)

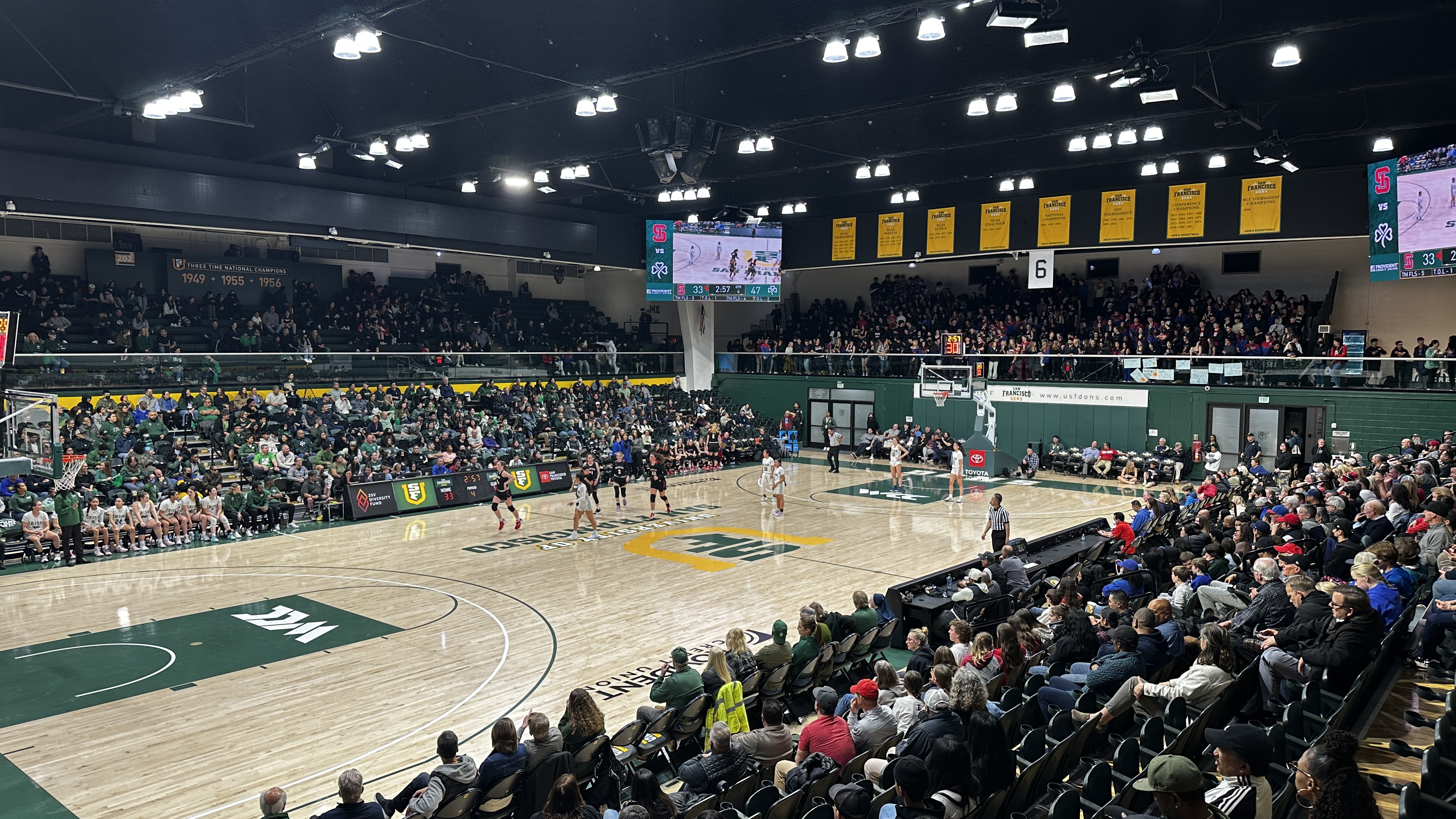
Sobrato Center (San Francisco)

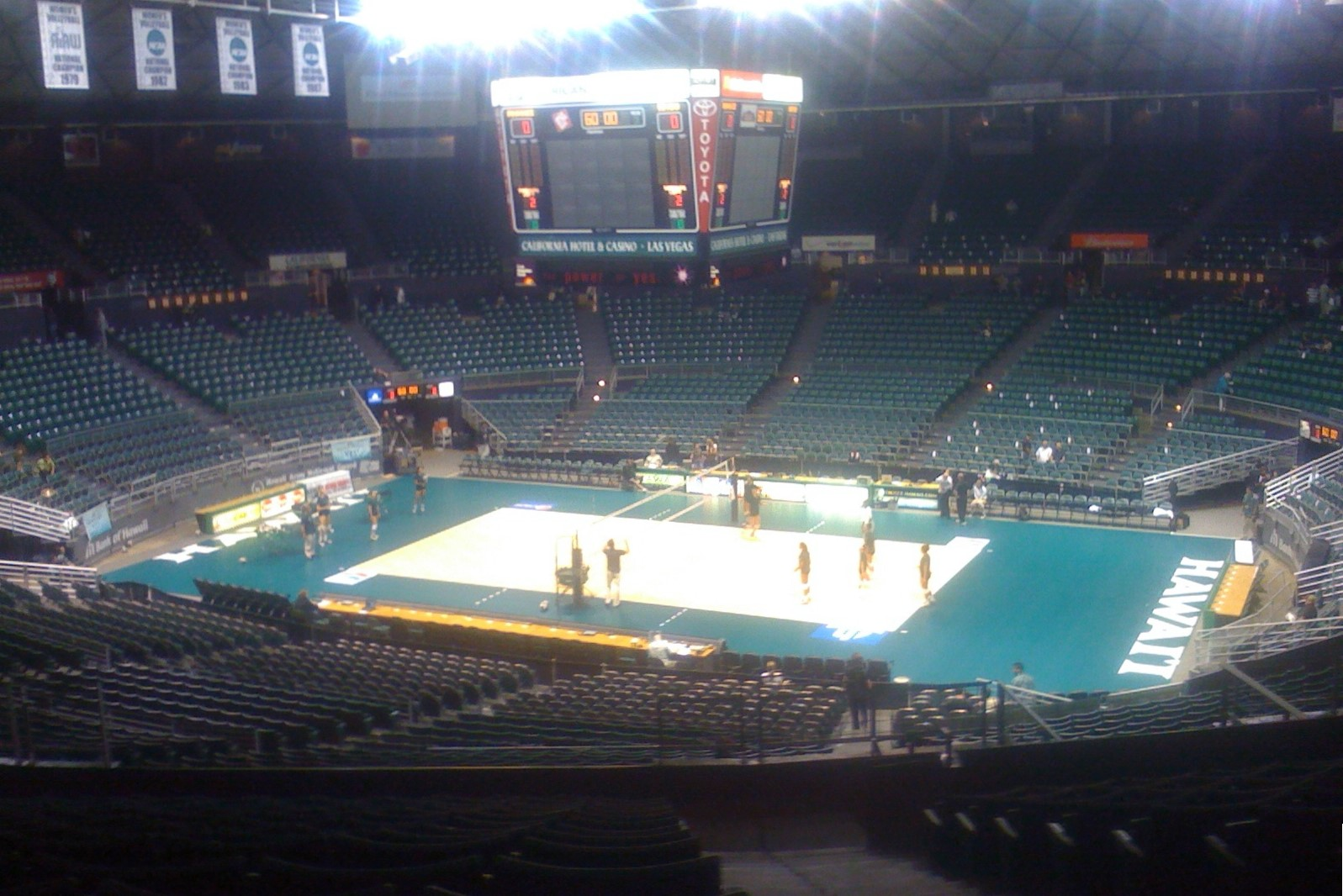
Stan Sheriff Center (Hawaii)

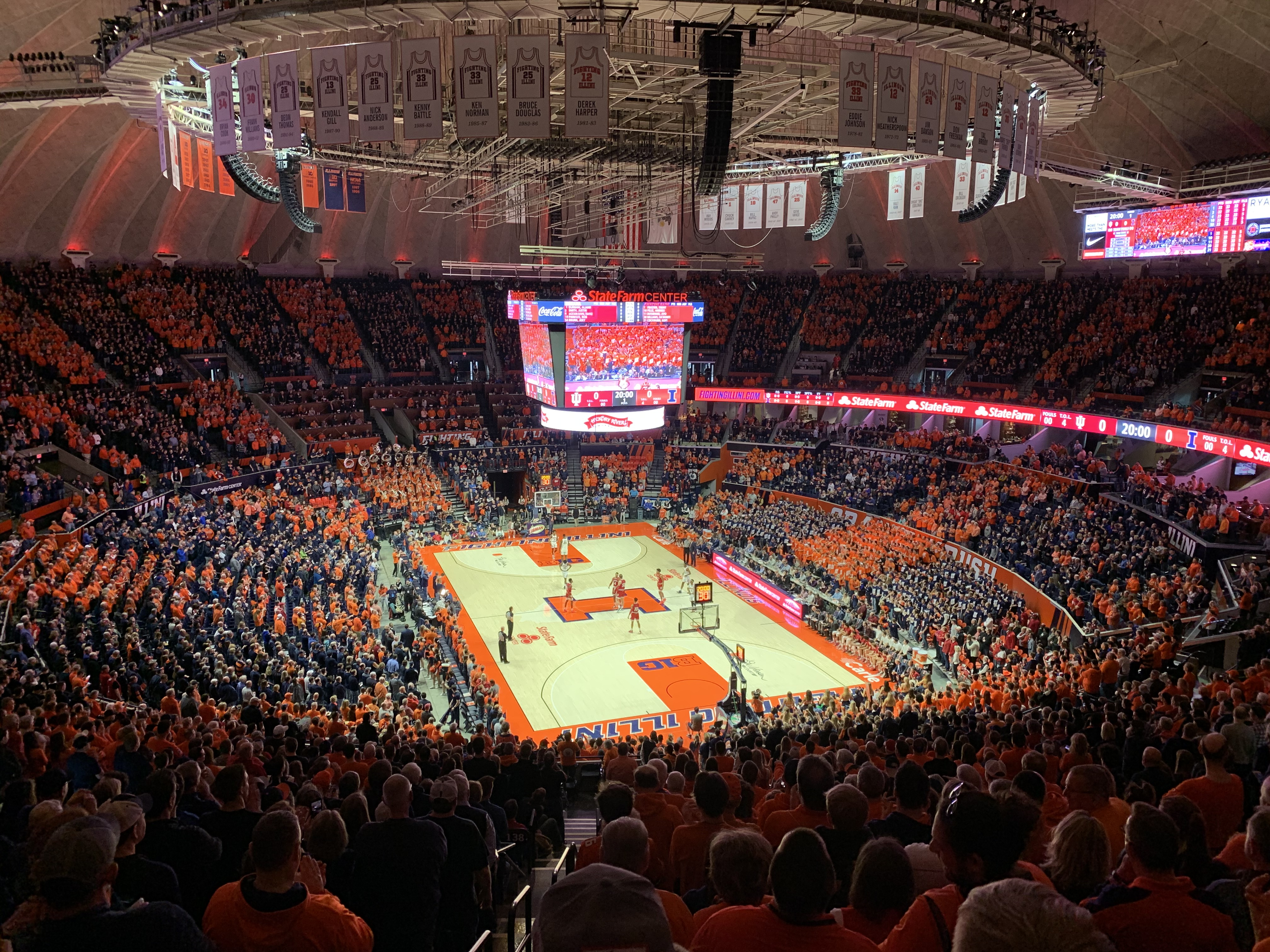
State Farm Center (Illinois)

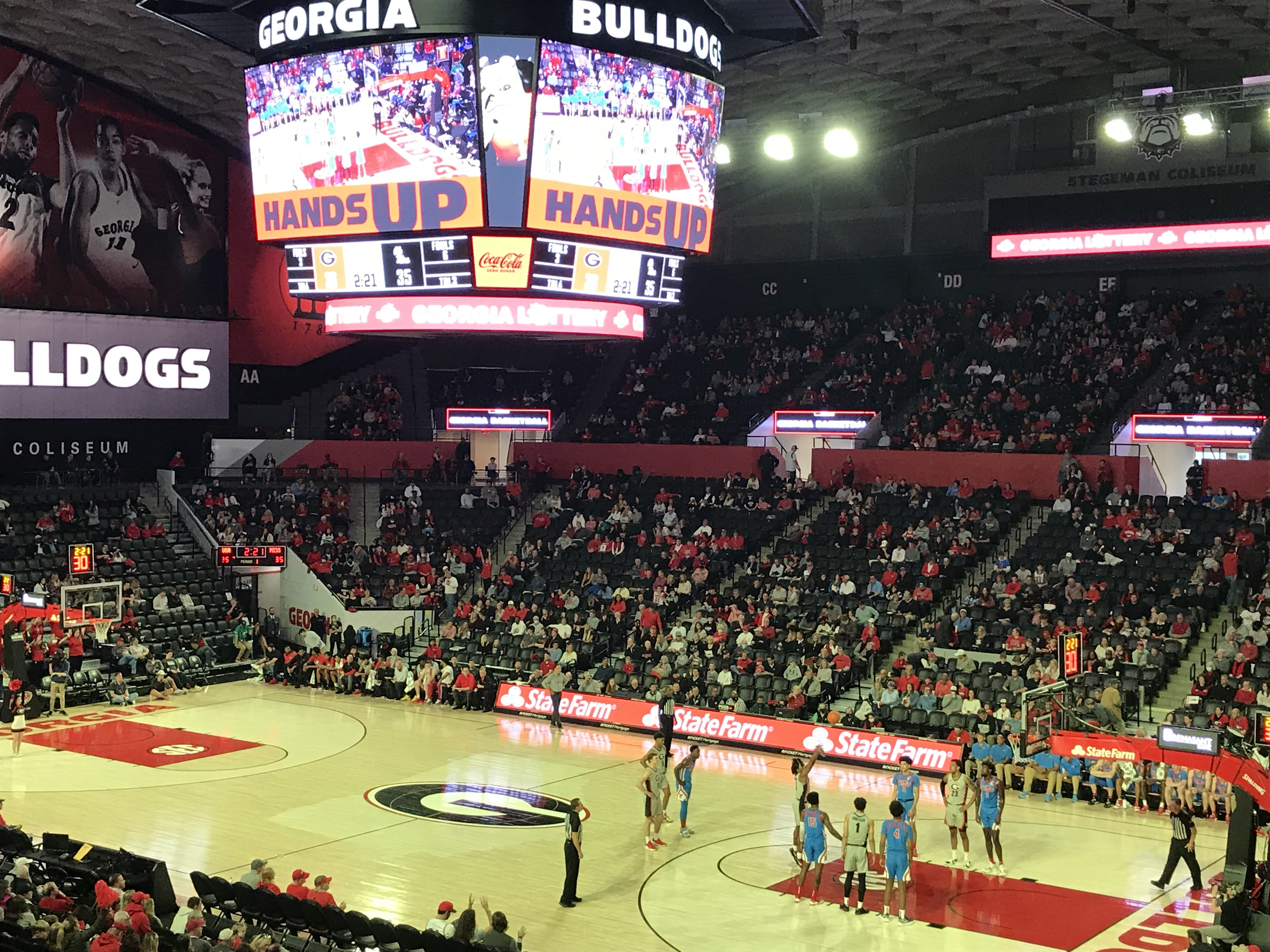
Stegeman Coliseum (Georgia)

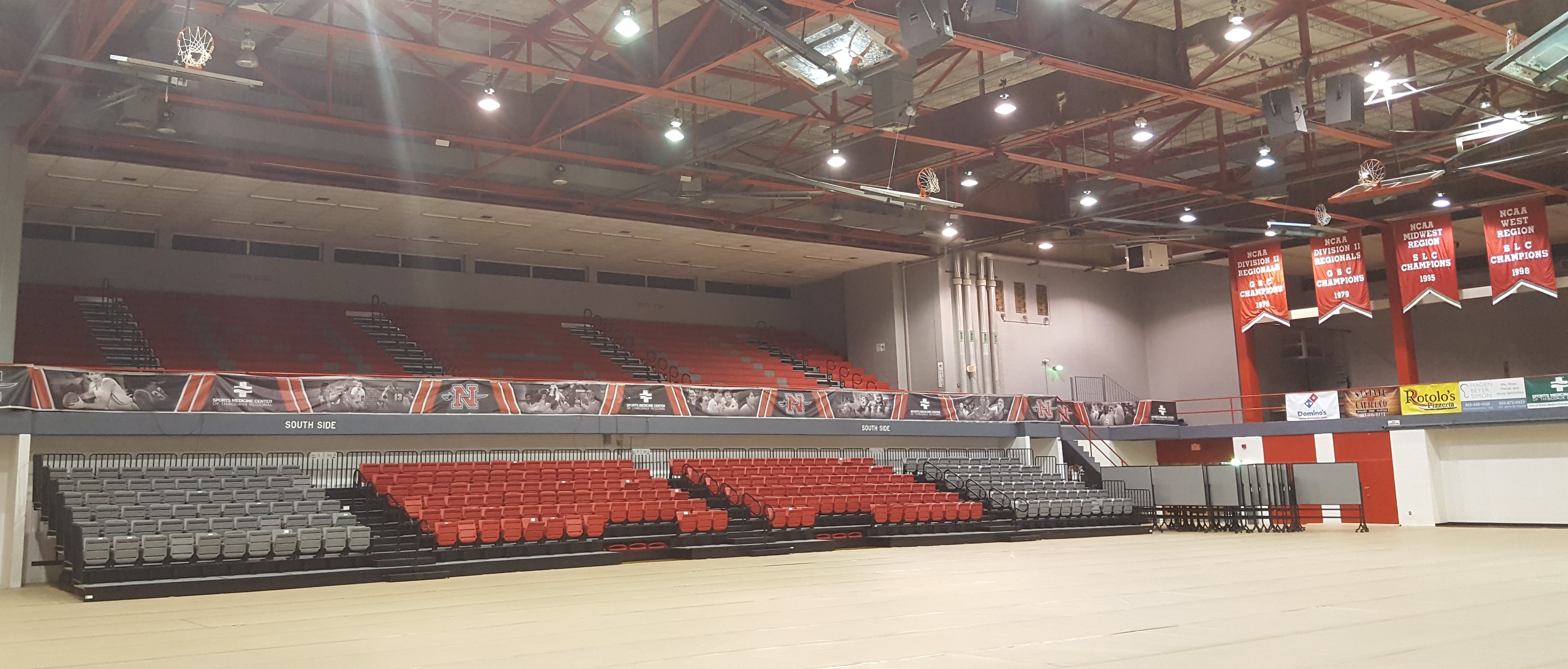
Stopher Gymnasium (Nicholls)

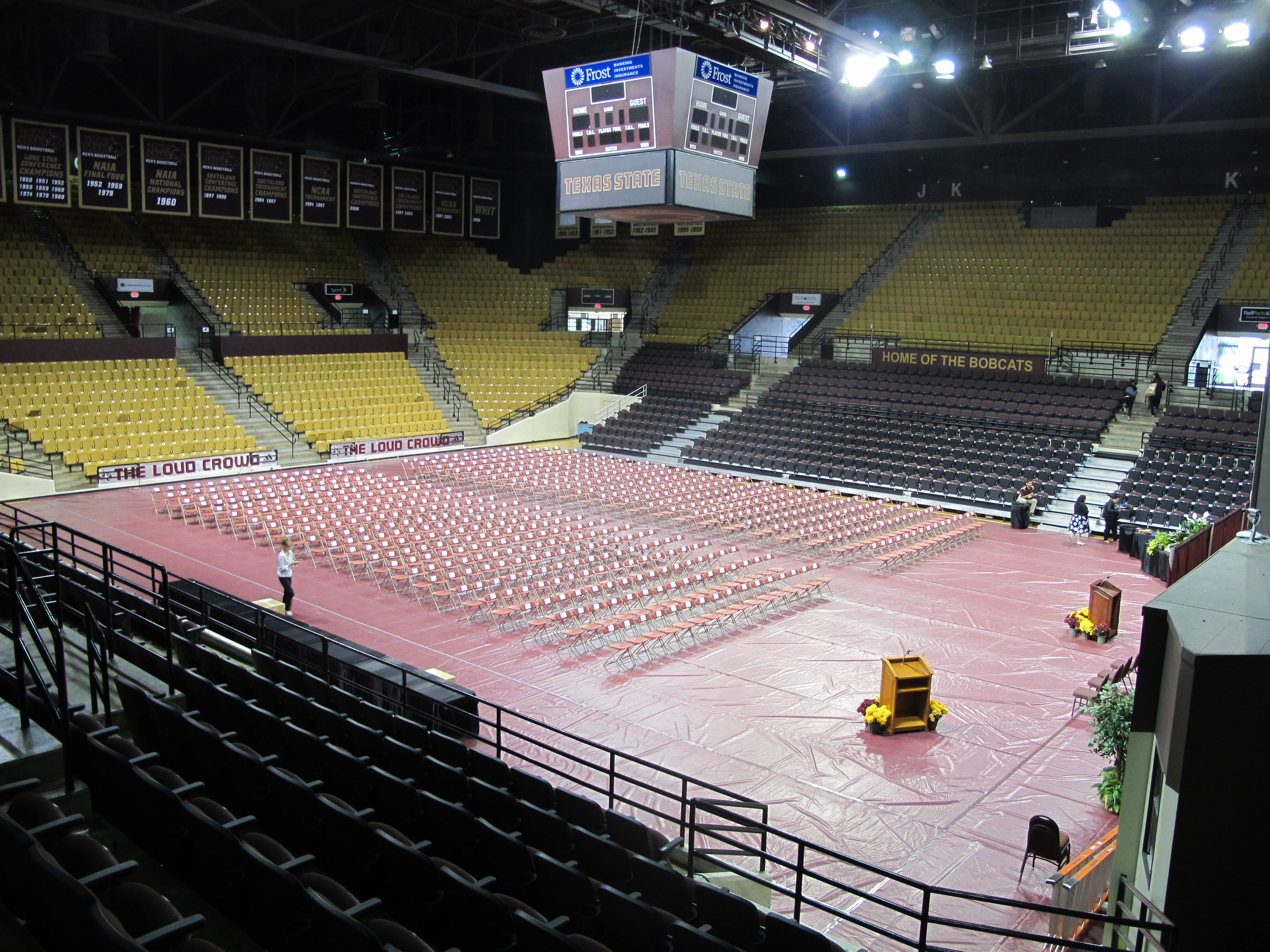
Strahan Arena (Texas State)

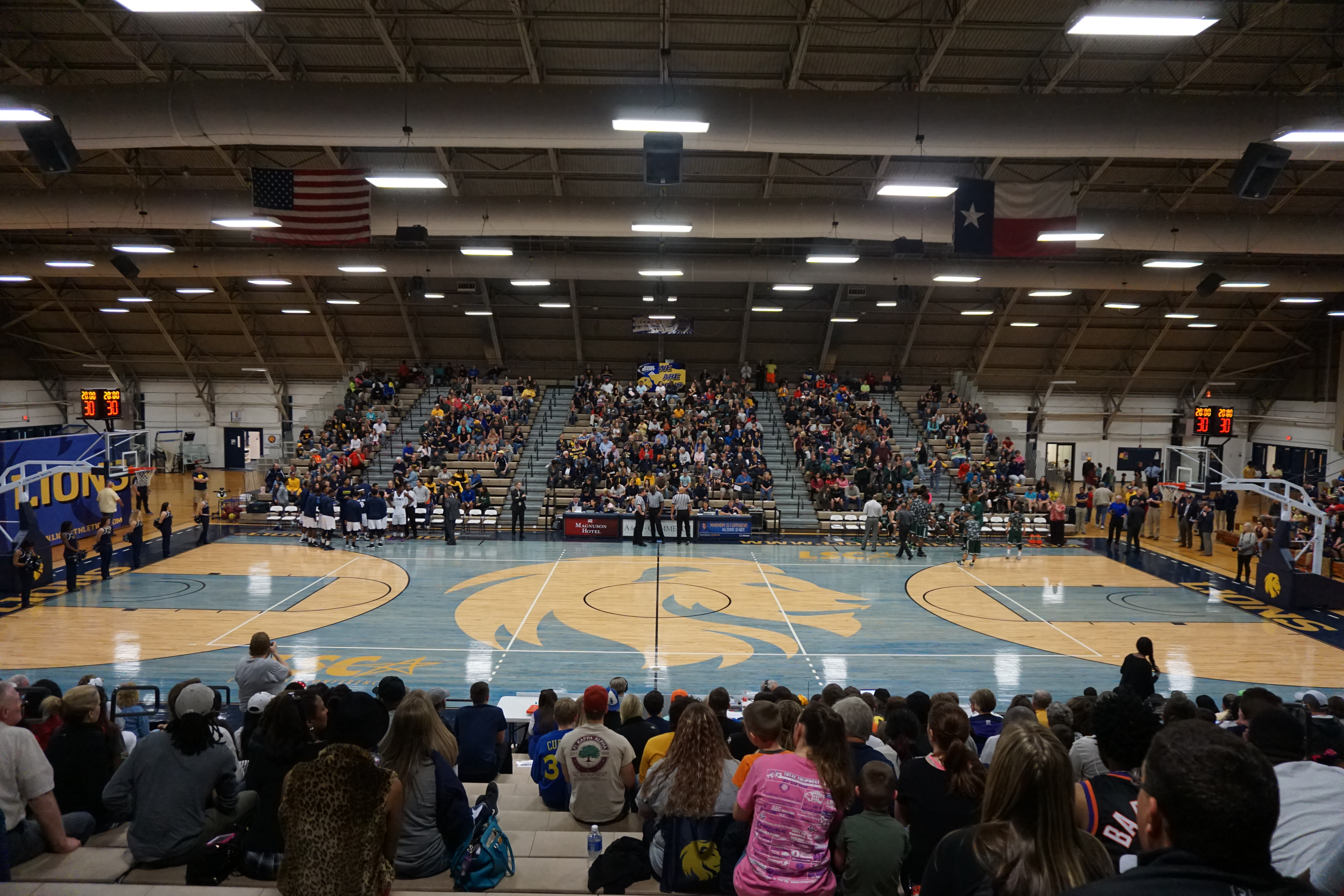
Texas A&M–Commerce Field House (Texas A&M–Commerce)

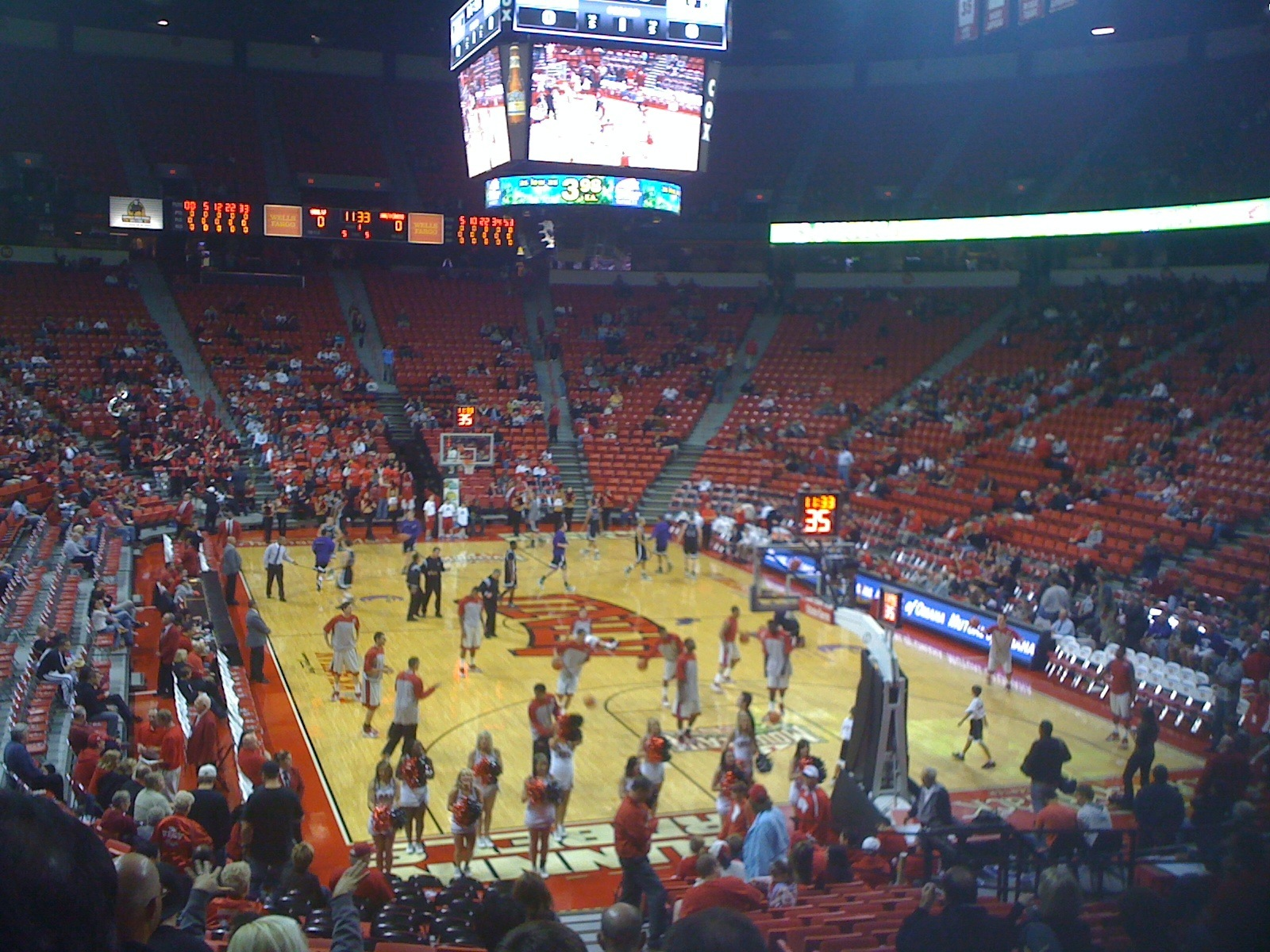
Thomas & Mack Center (UNLV)

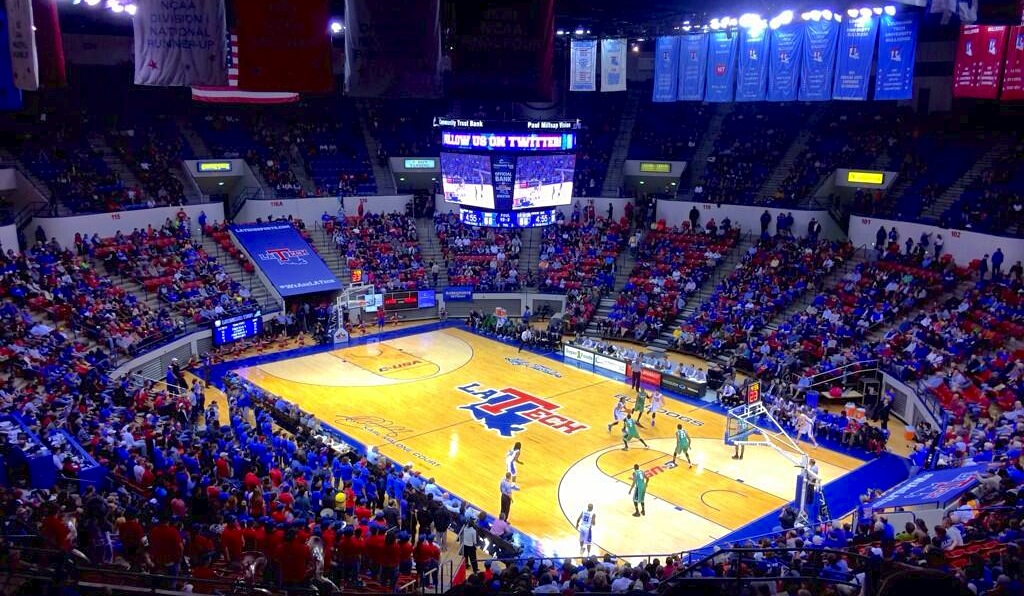
Thomas Assembly Center (Louisiana Tech)

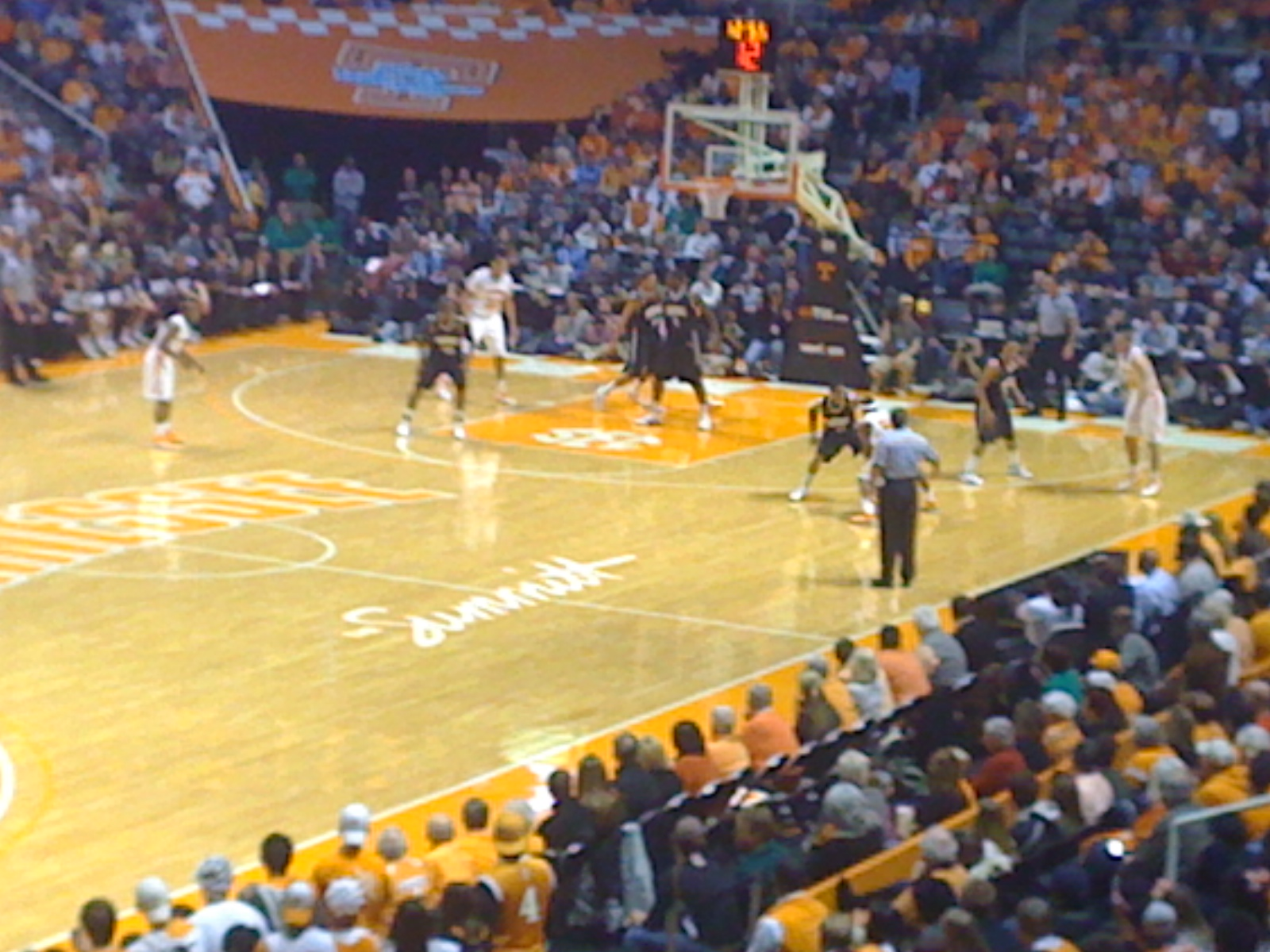
Thompson–Boling Arena (Tennessee)

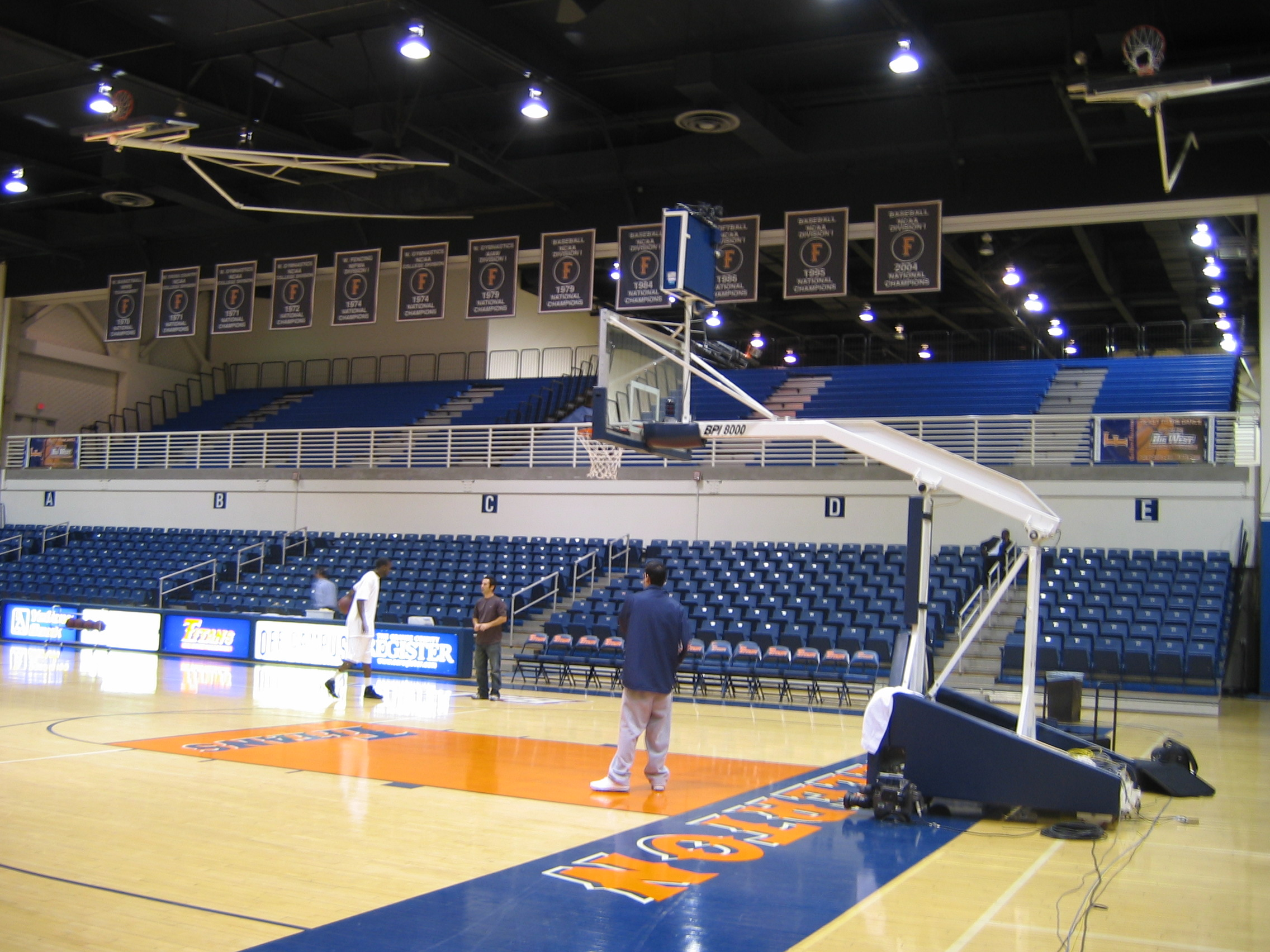
Titan Gym (Cal State Fullerton)

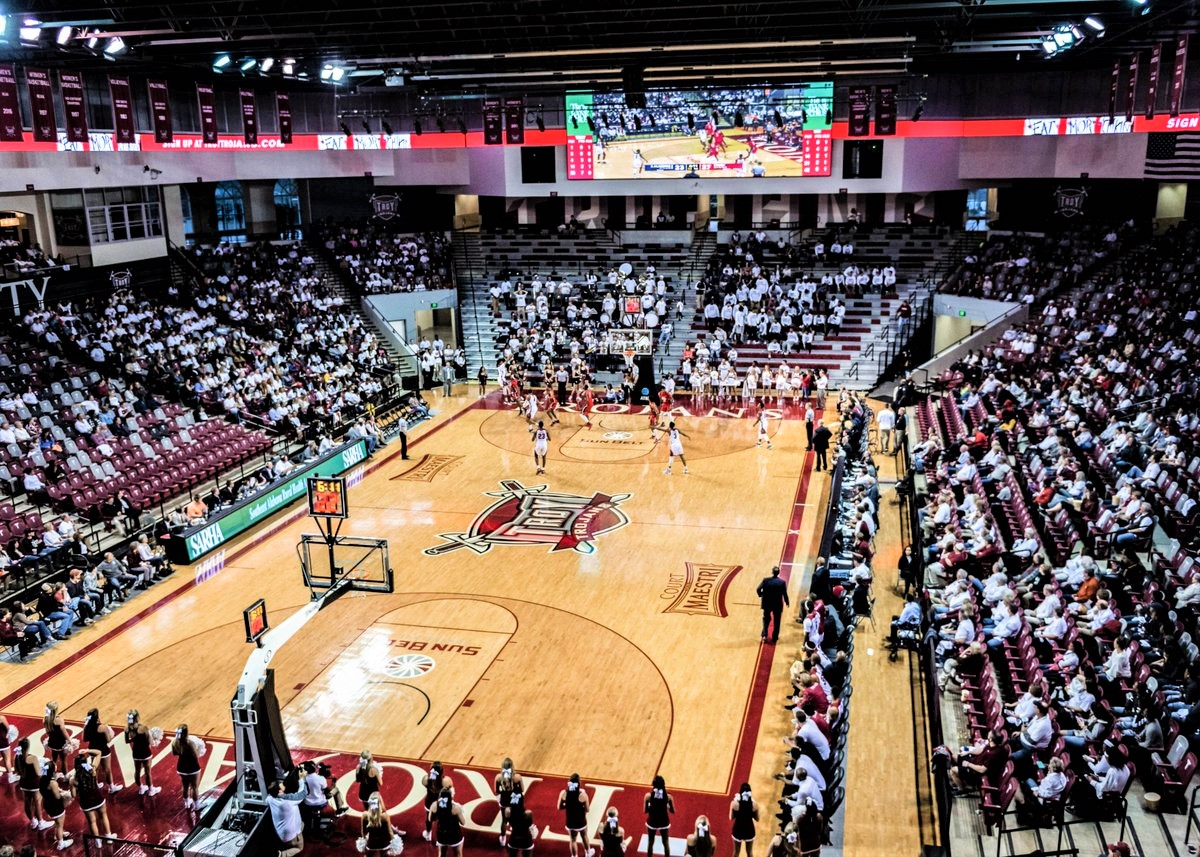
Trojan Arena (Troy)

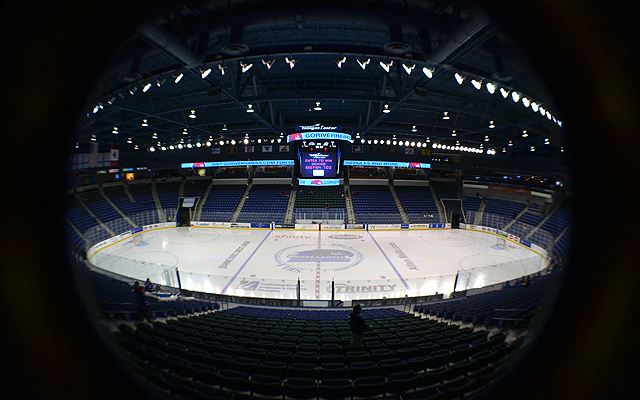
Tsongas Center (UMass Lowell)

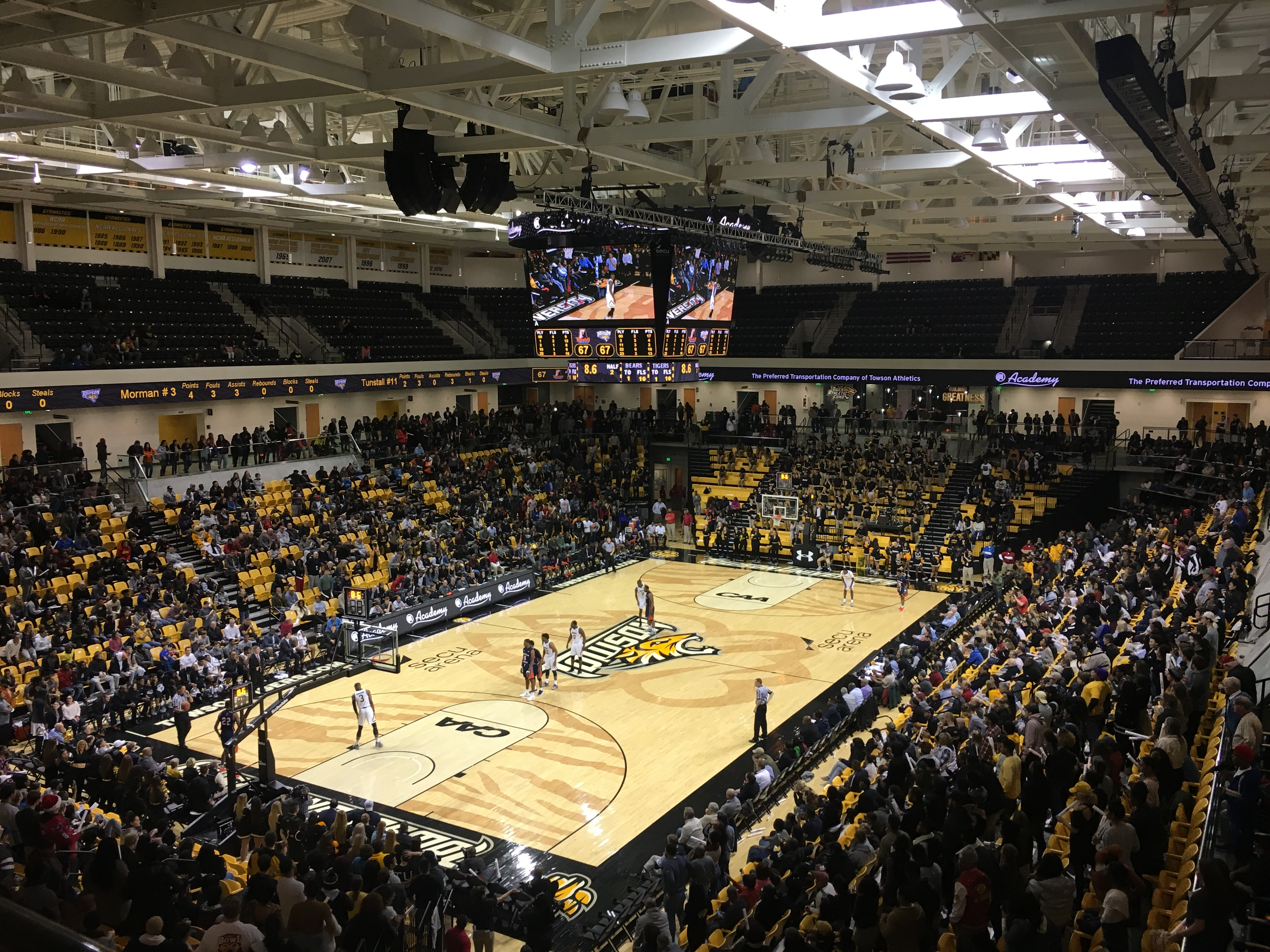
TU Arena (Towson)

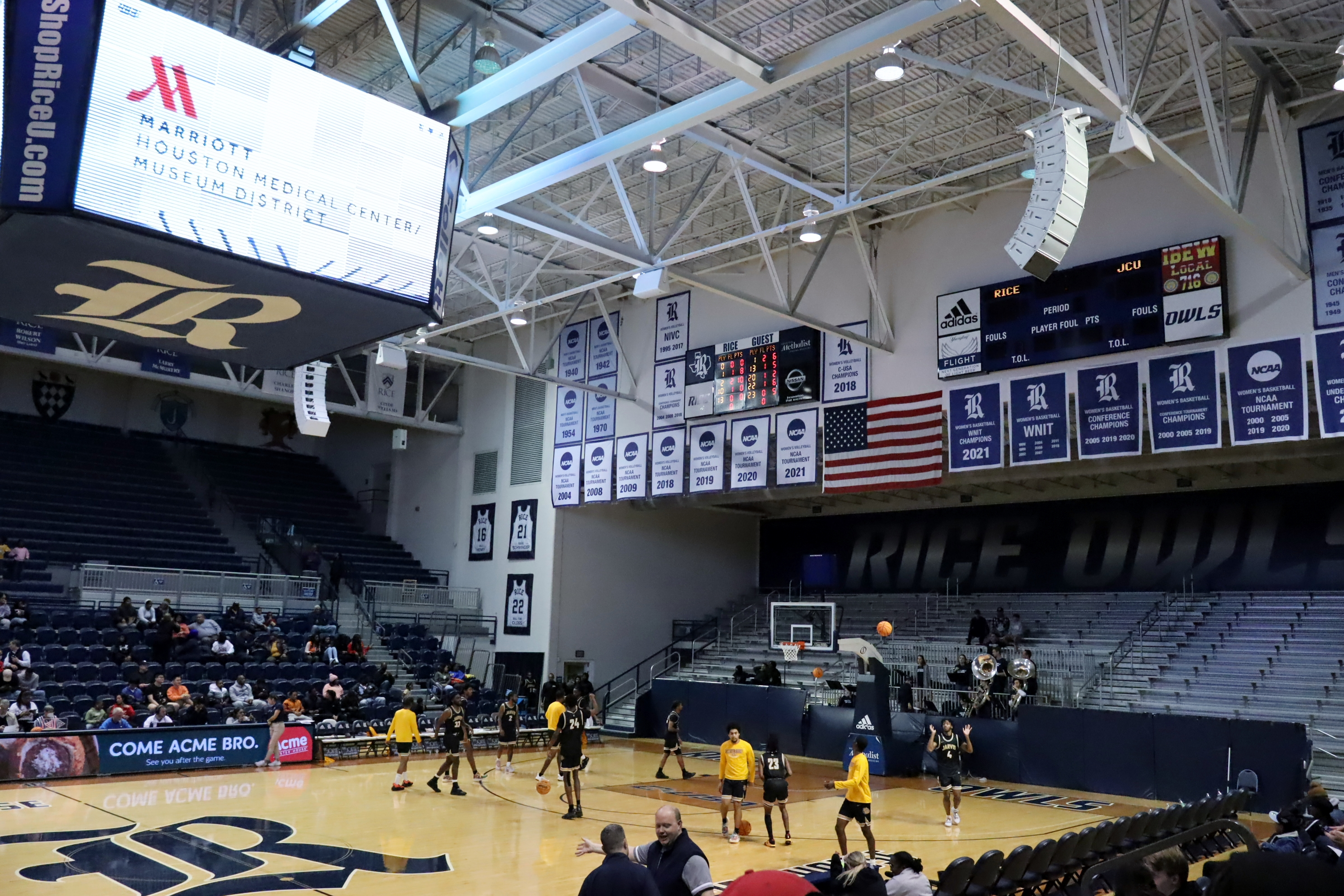
Tudor Fieldhouse (Rice)

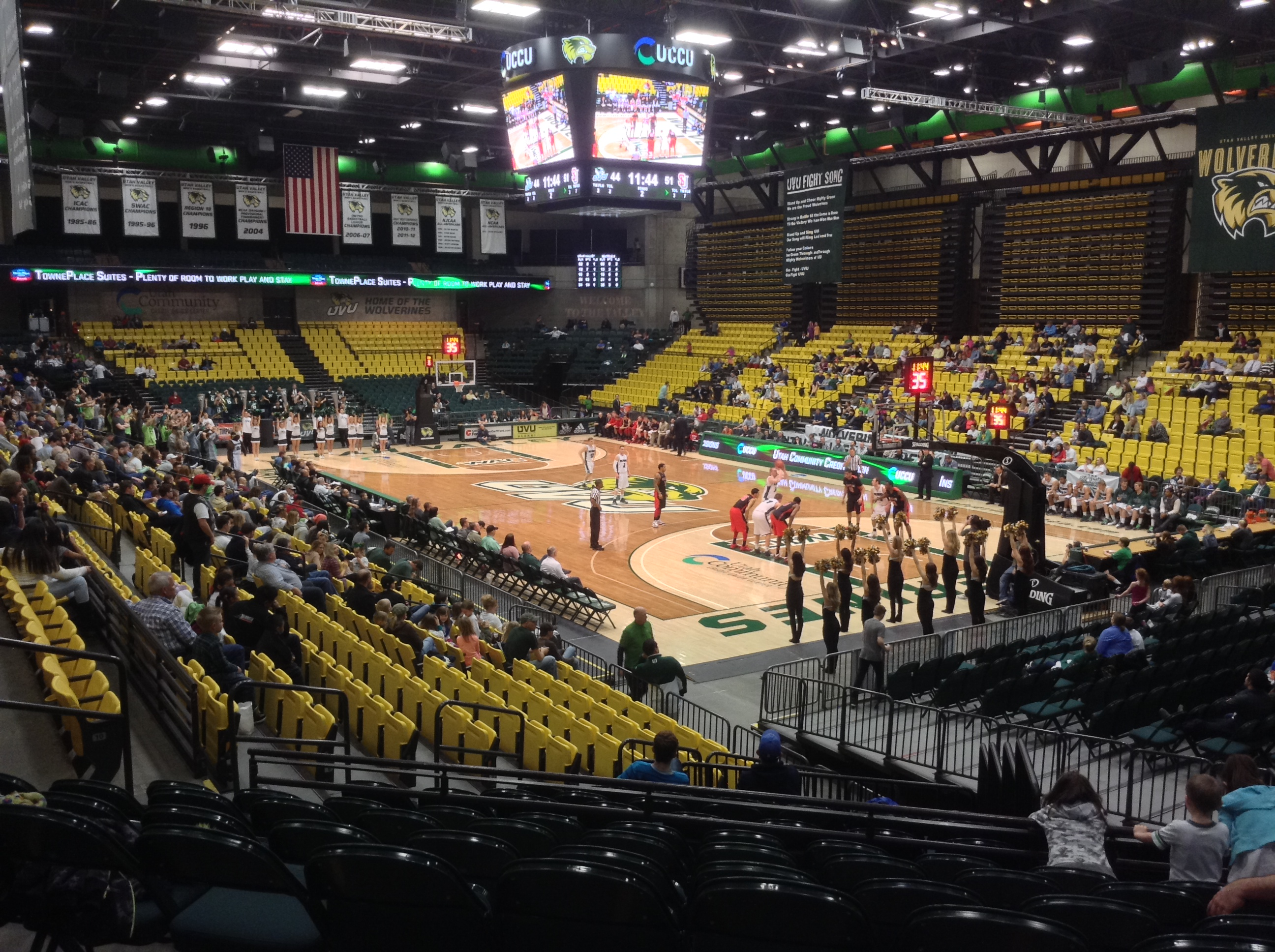
UCCU Center (Utah Valley)

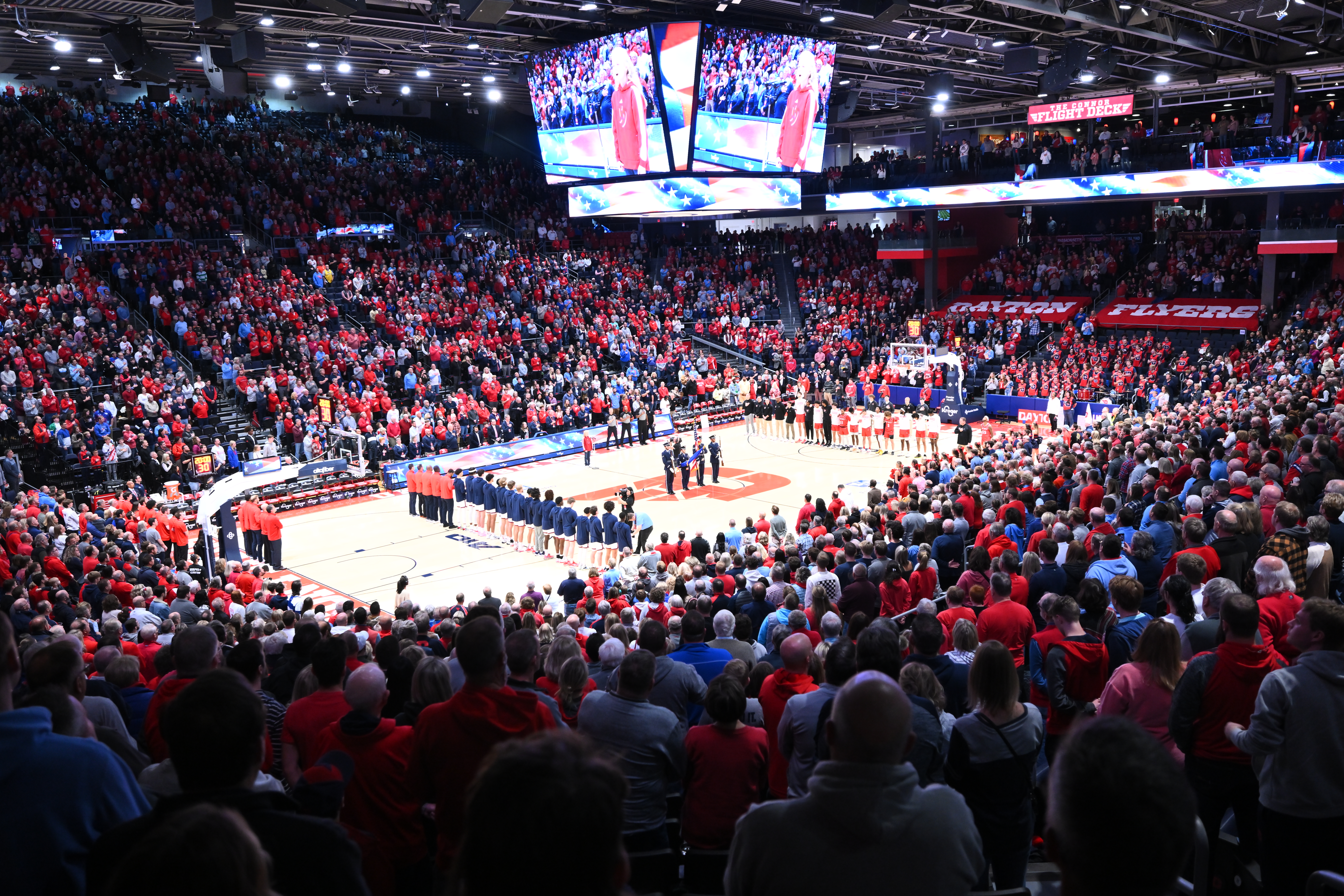
UD Arena (Dayton)

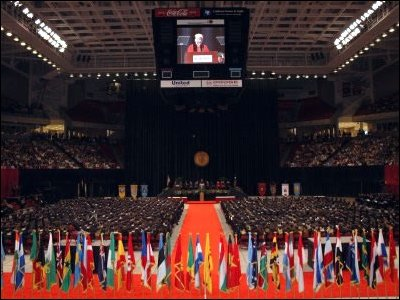
United Supermarkets Arena (Texas Tech)

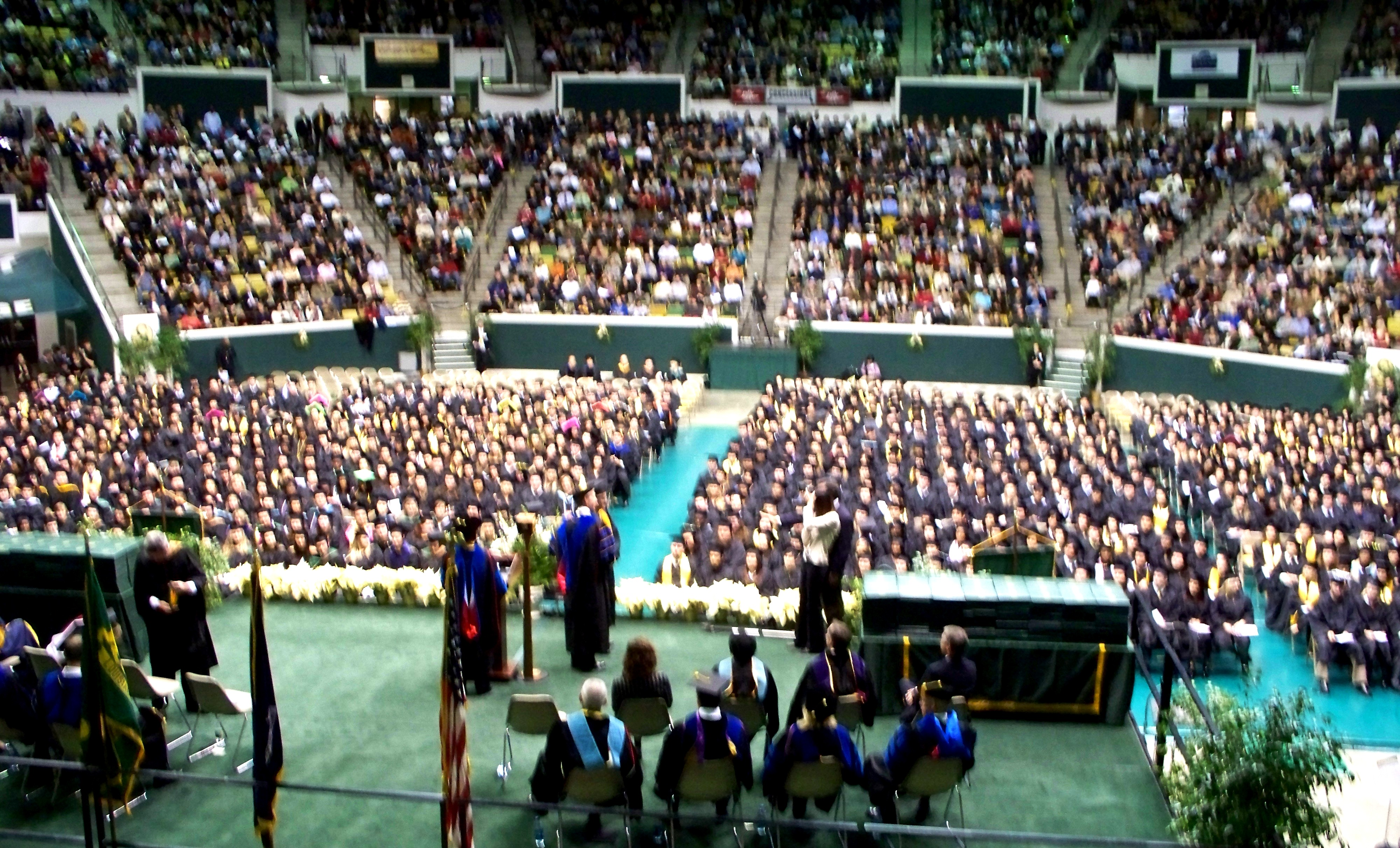
University Center (Southeastern Louisiana)

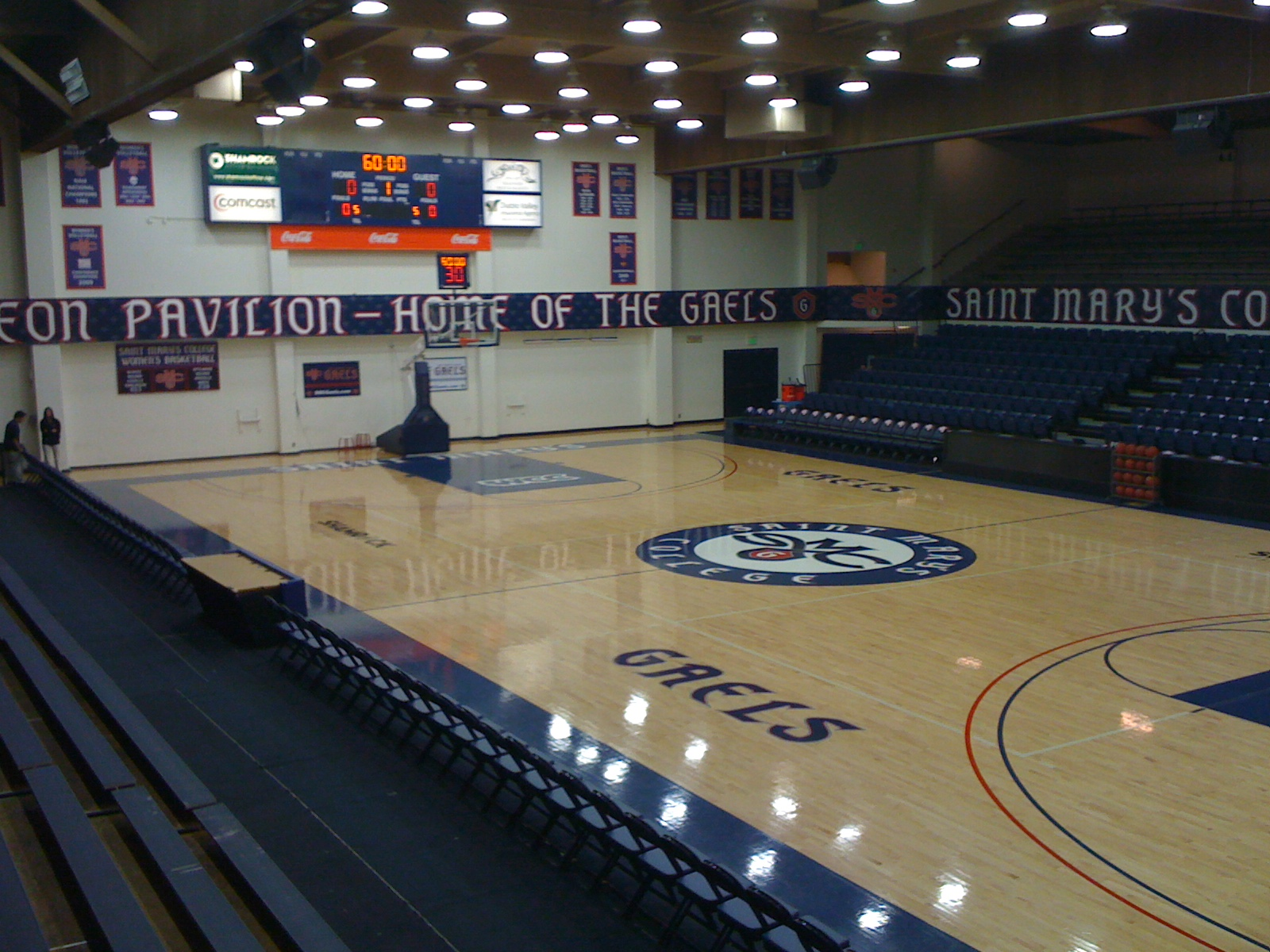
University Credit Union Pavilion (Saint Mary's)

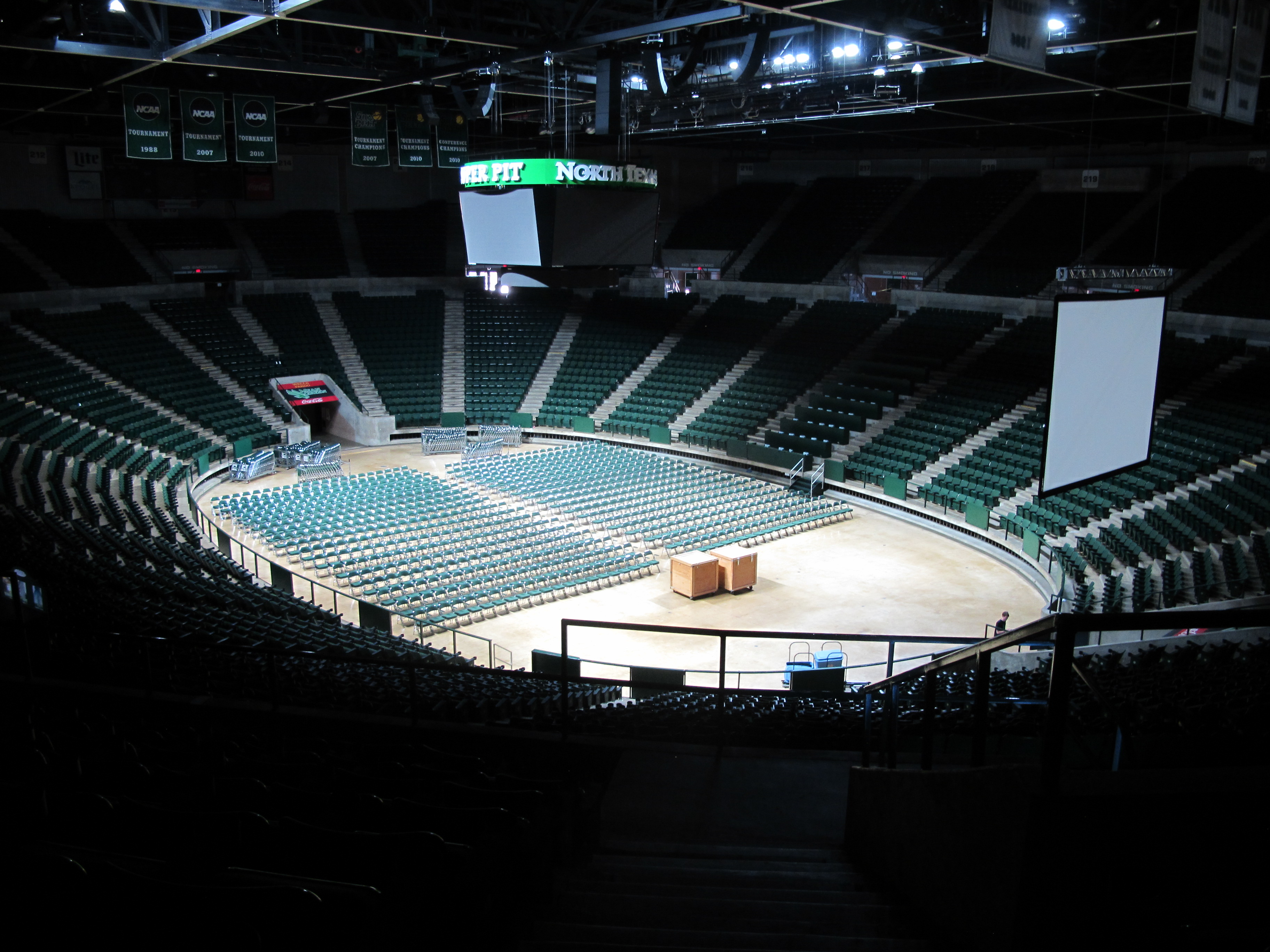
UNT Coliseum (North Texas)

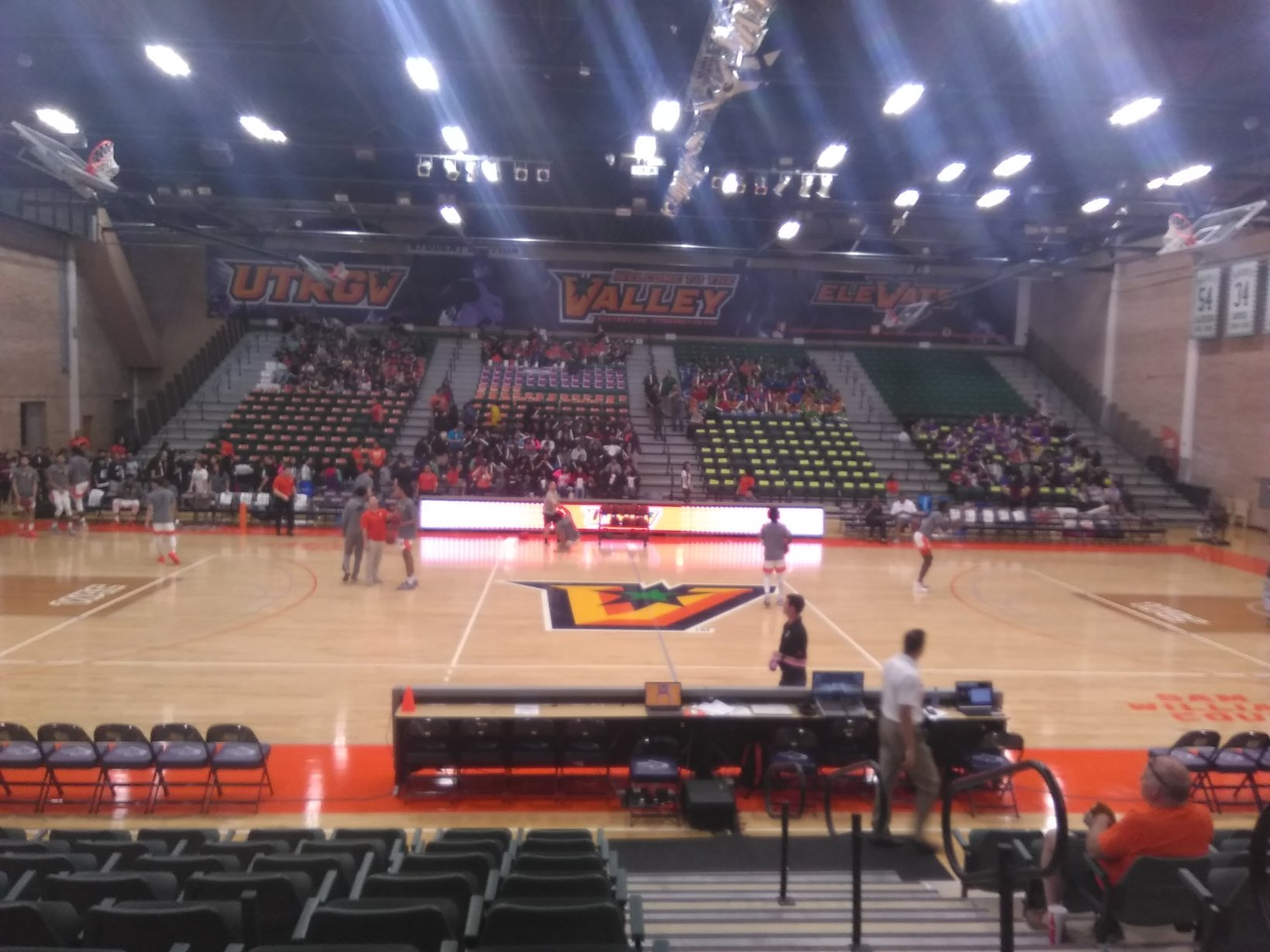
UTRGV Fieldhouse (UTRGV)

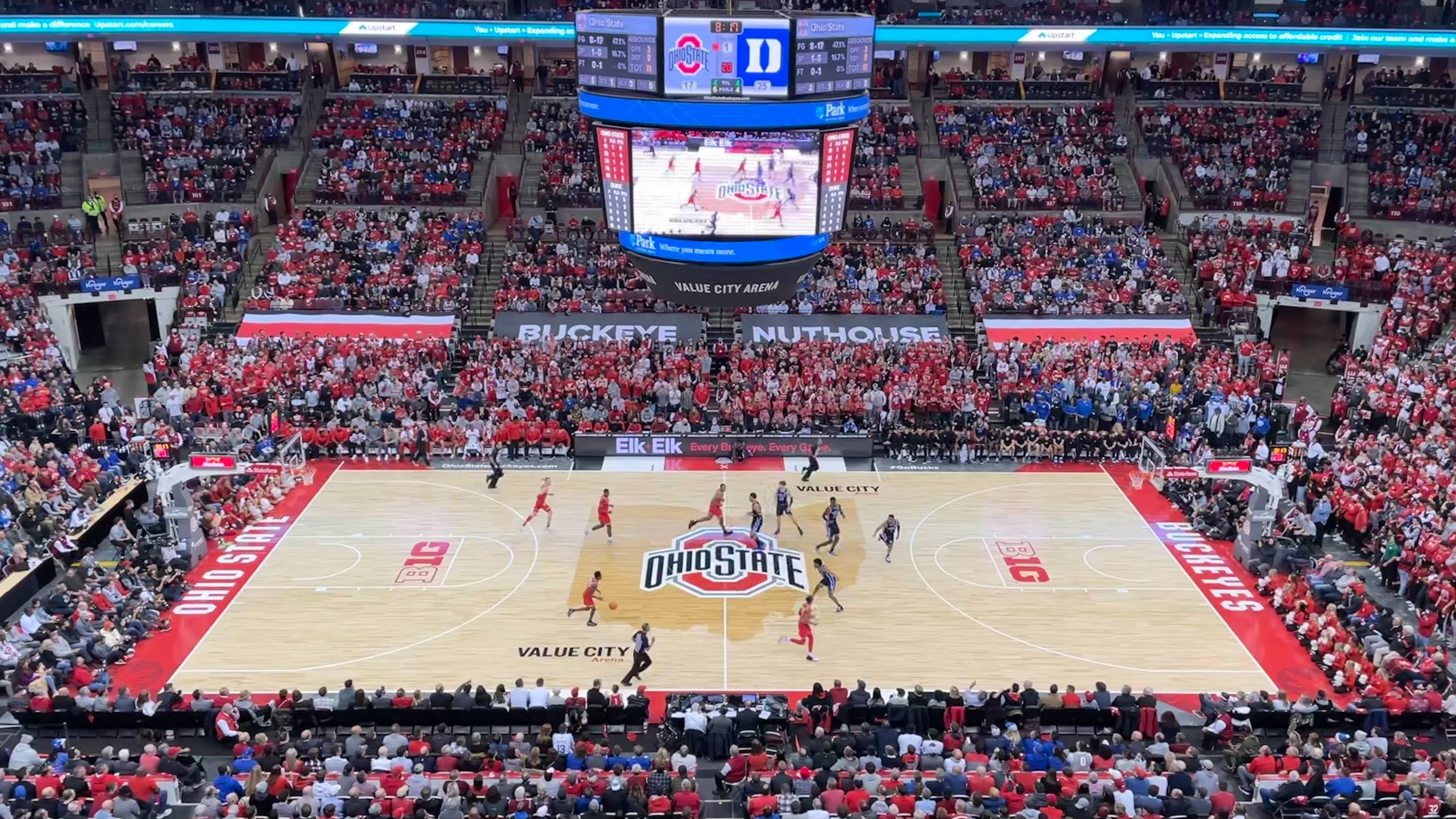
Value City Arena (Ohio State)

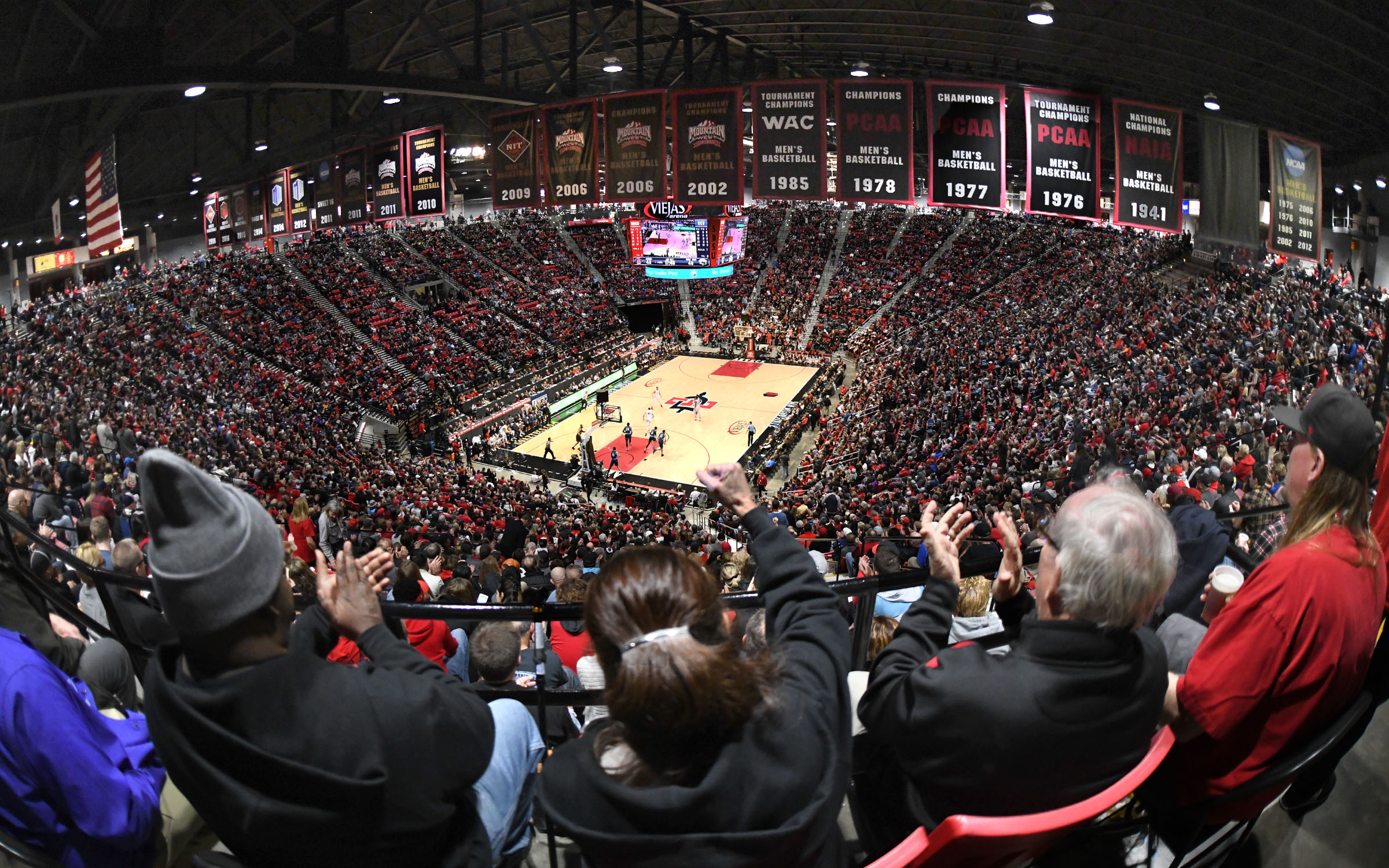
Viejas Arena (San Diego State)

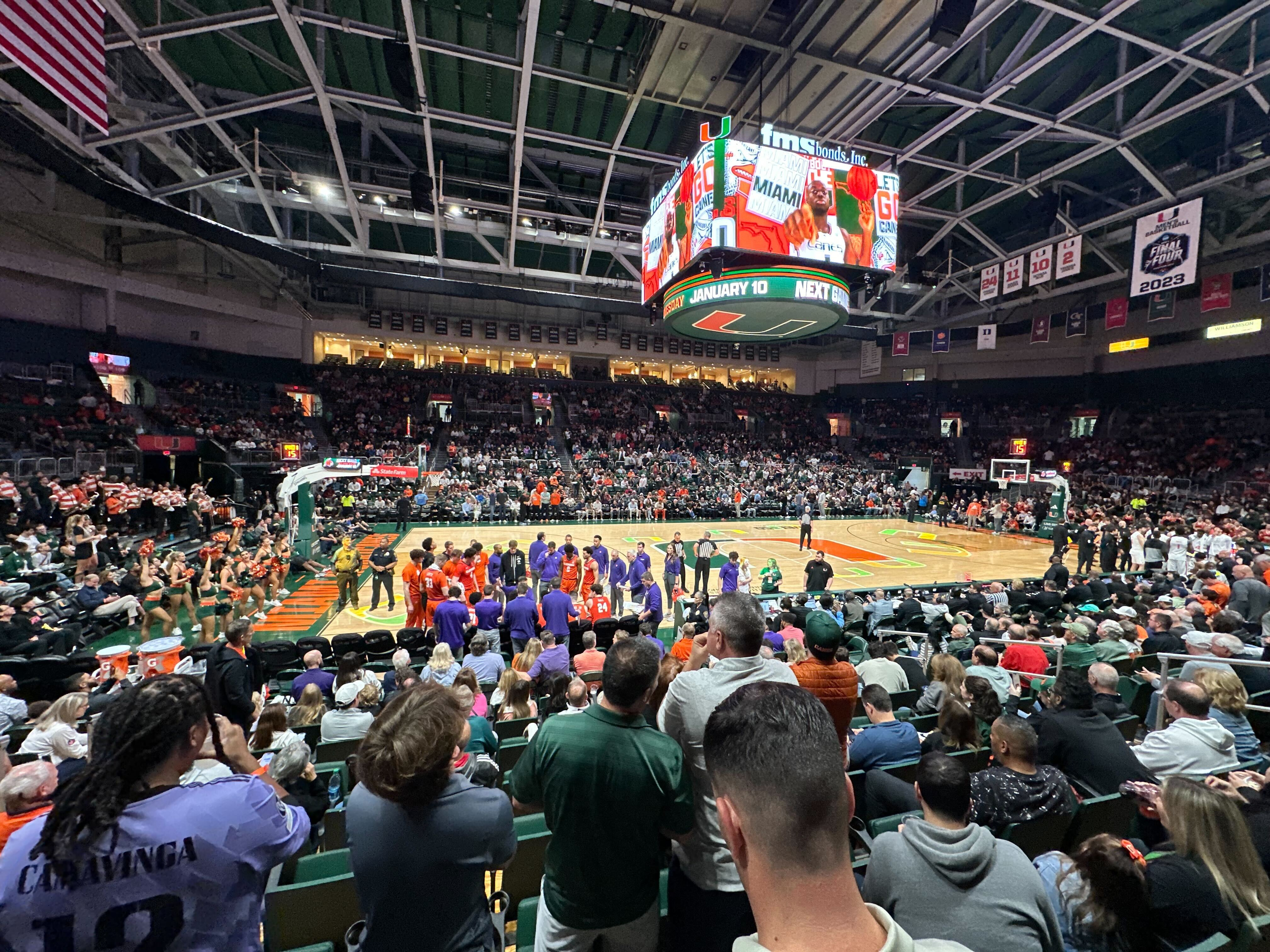
Watsco Center (Miami)

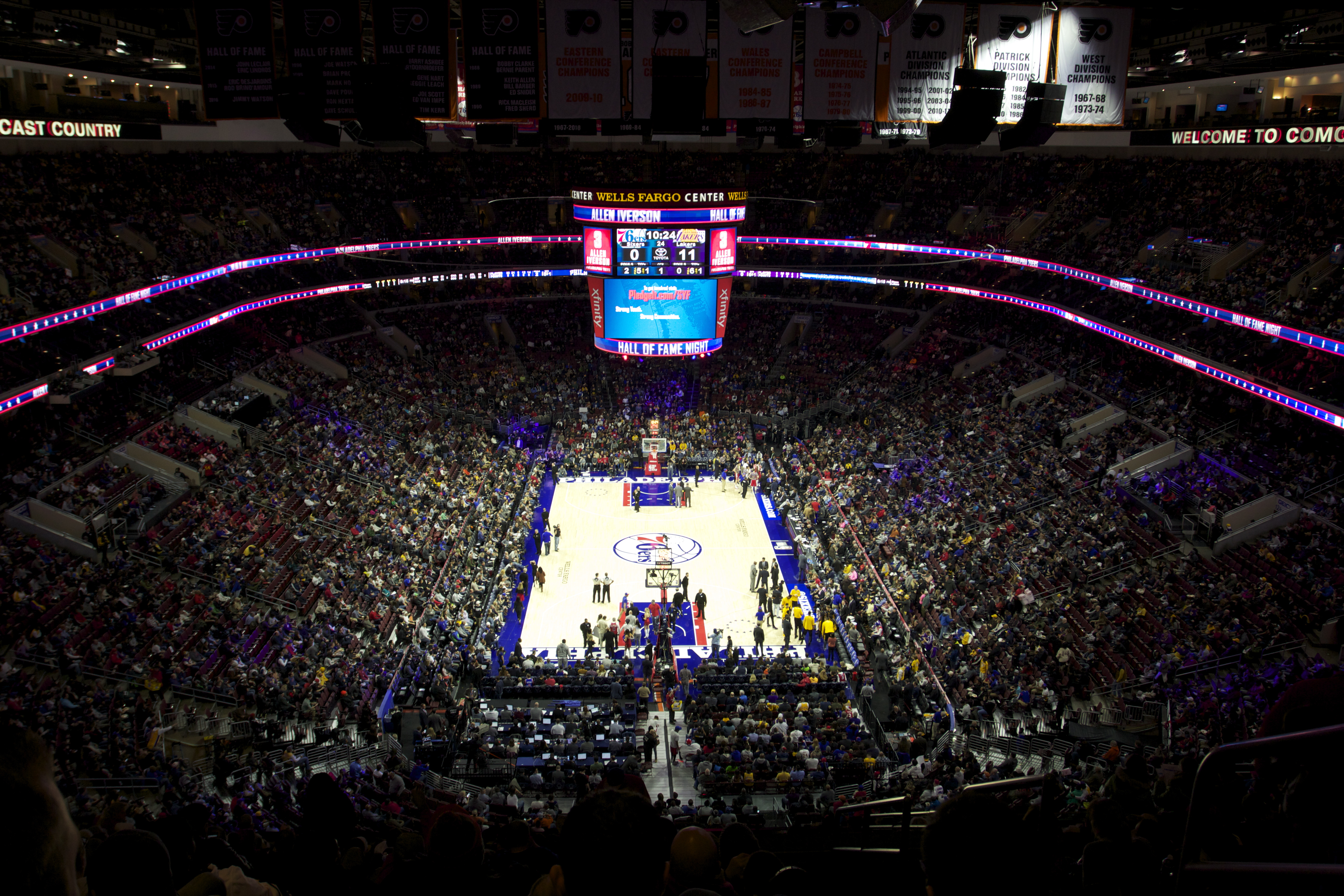
Xfinity Mobile Arena (Villanova)

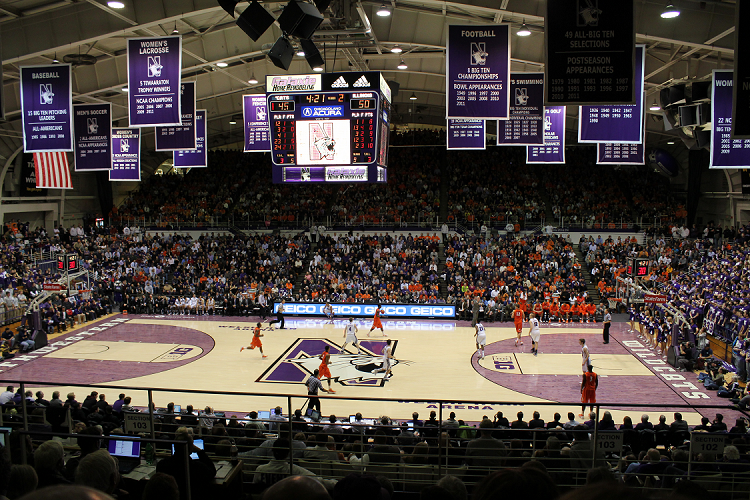
Welsh–Ryan Arena (Northwestern)

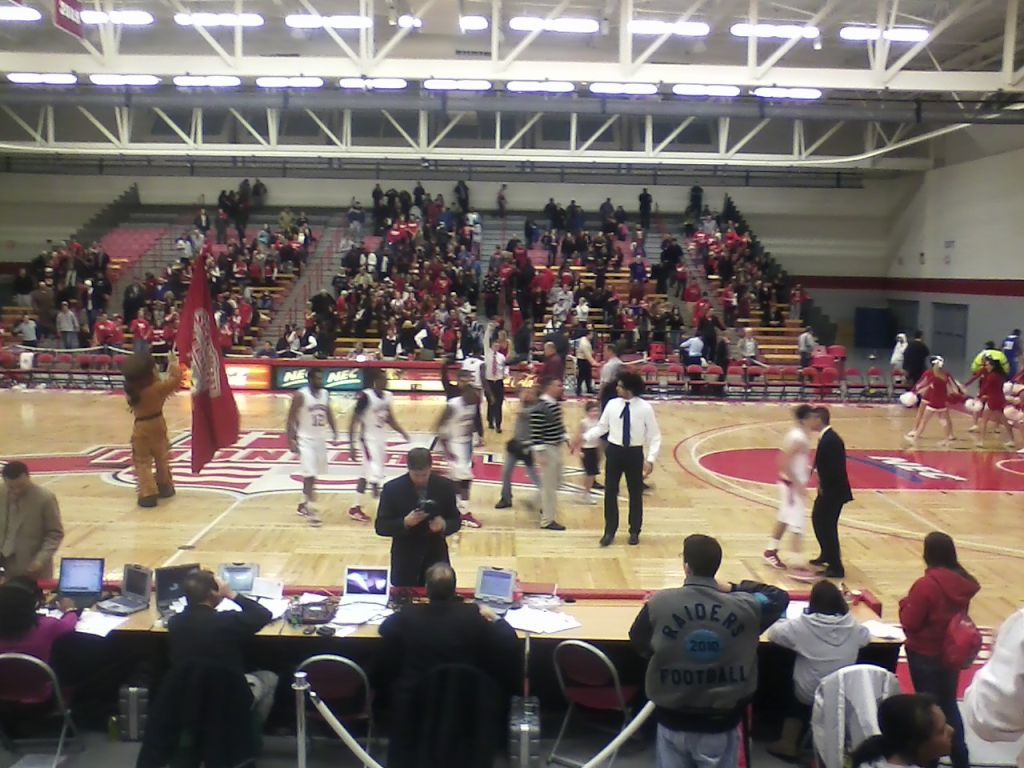
William H. Pitt Center (Sacred Heart)

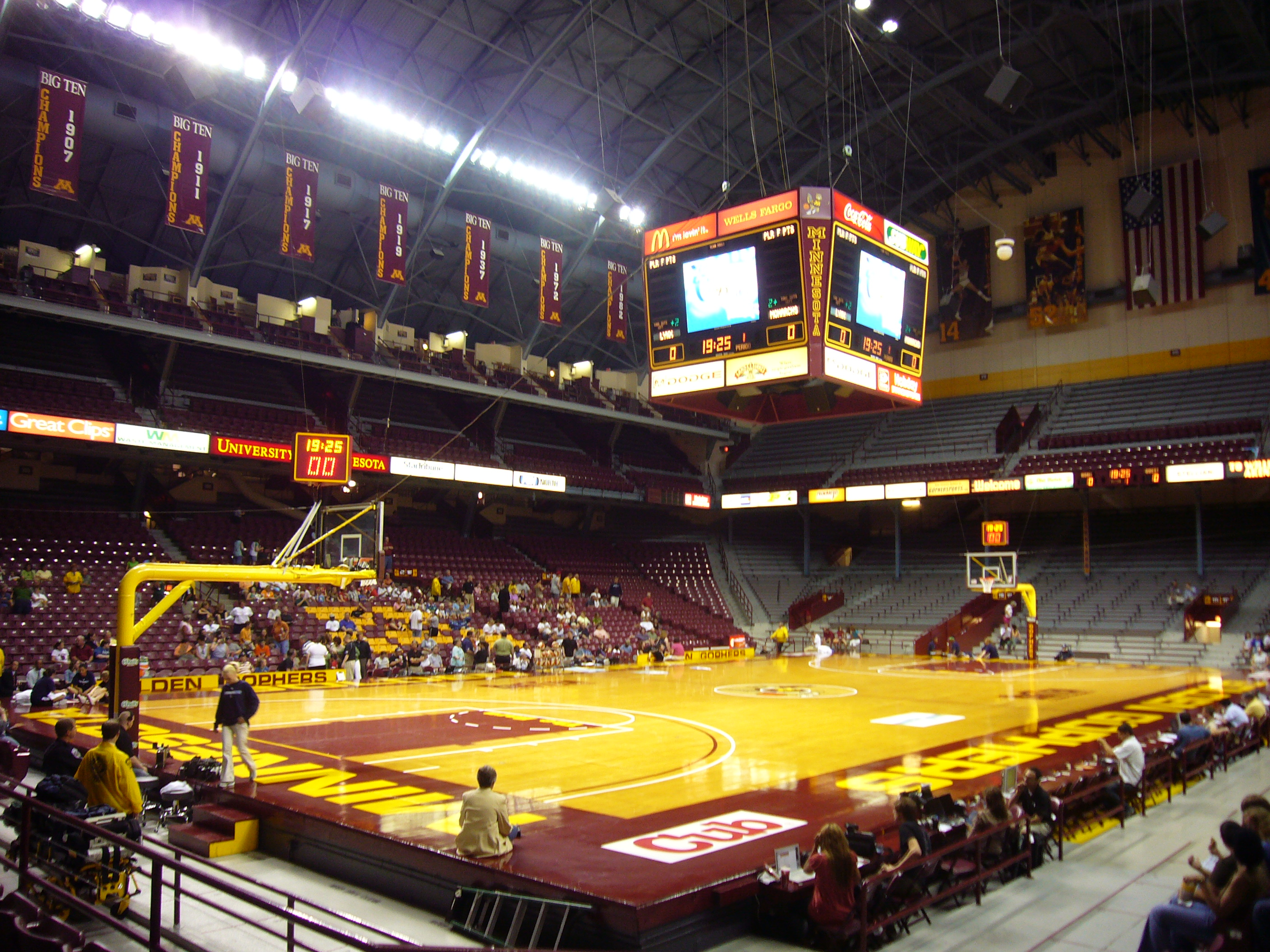
Williams Arena (Minnesota)

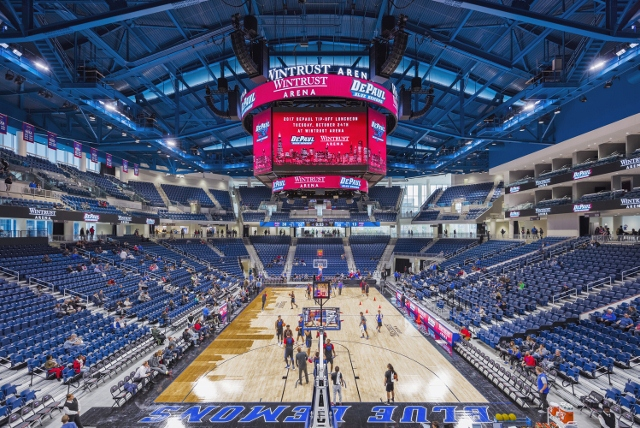
Wintrust Arena (DePaul)

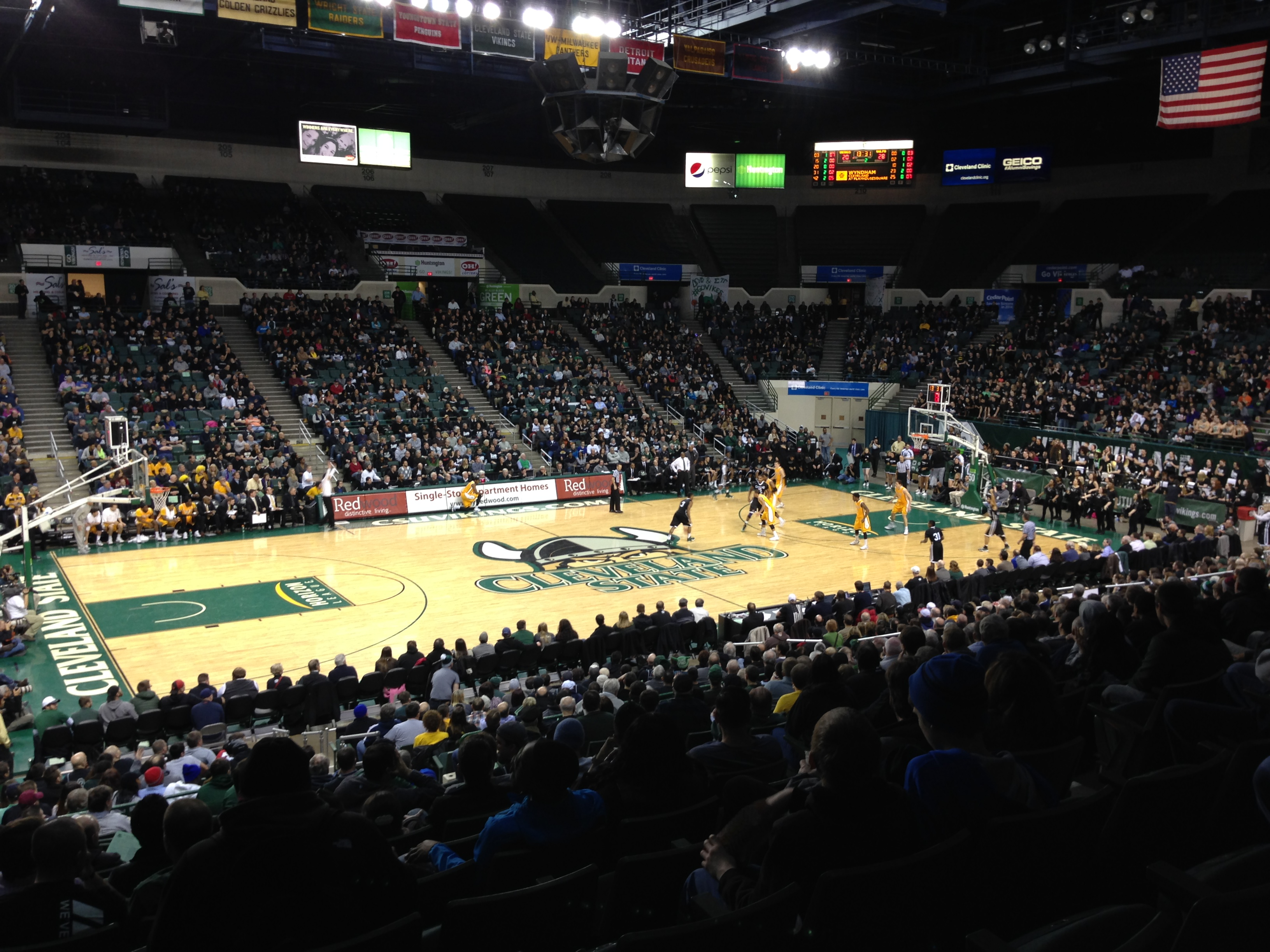
Wolstein Center (Cleveland State)

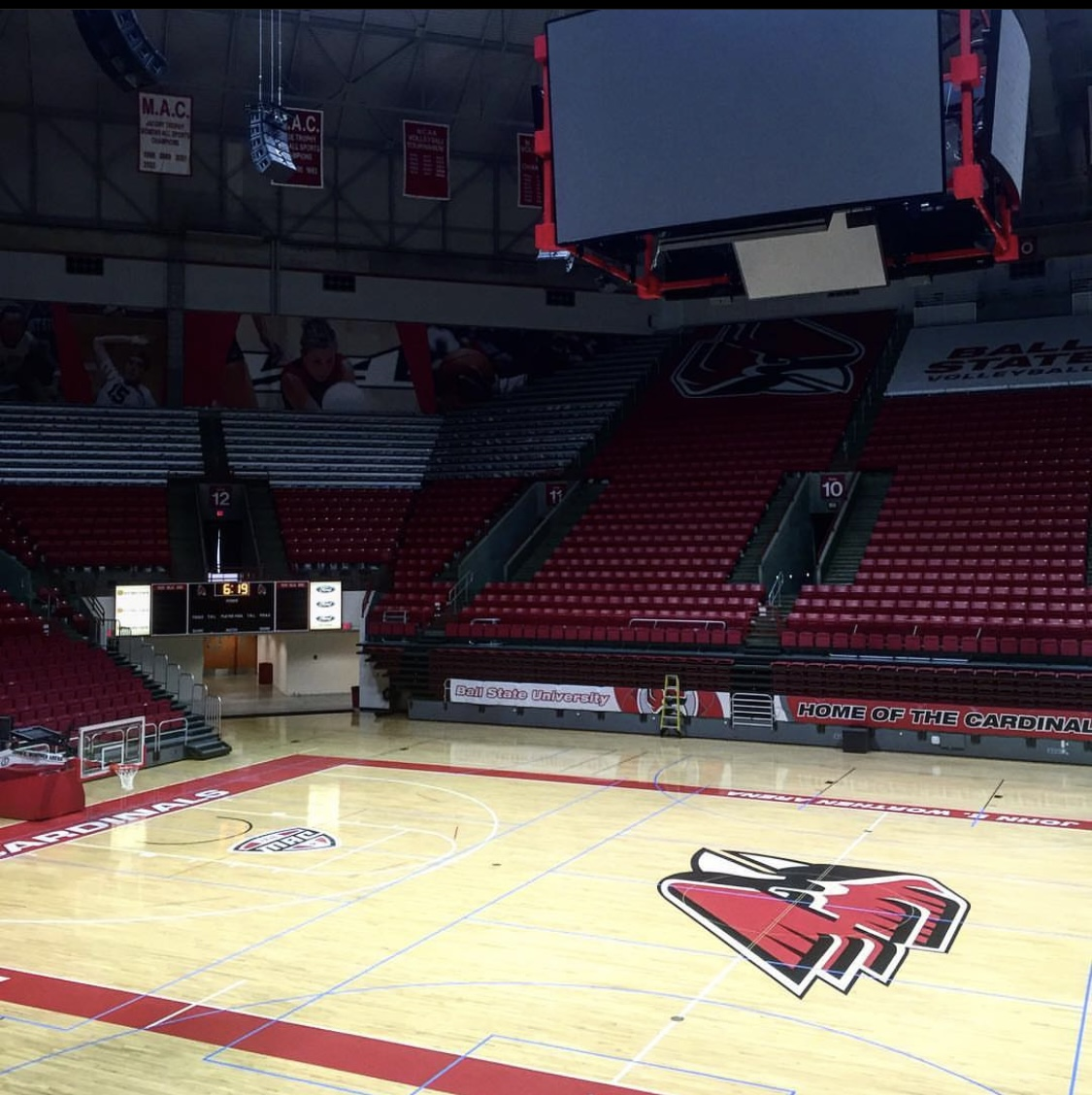
Worthen Arena (Ball State)

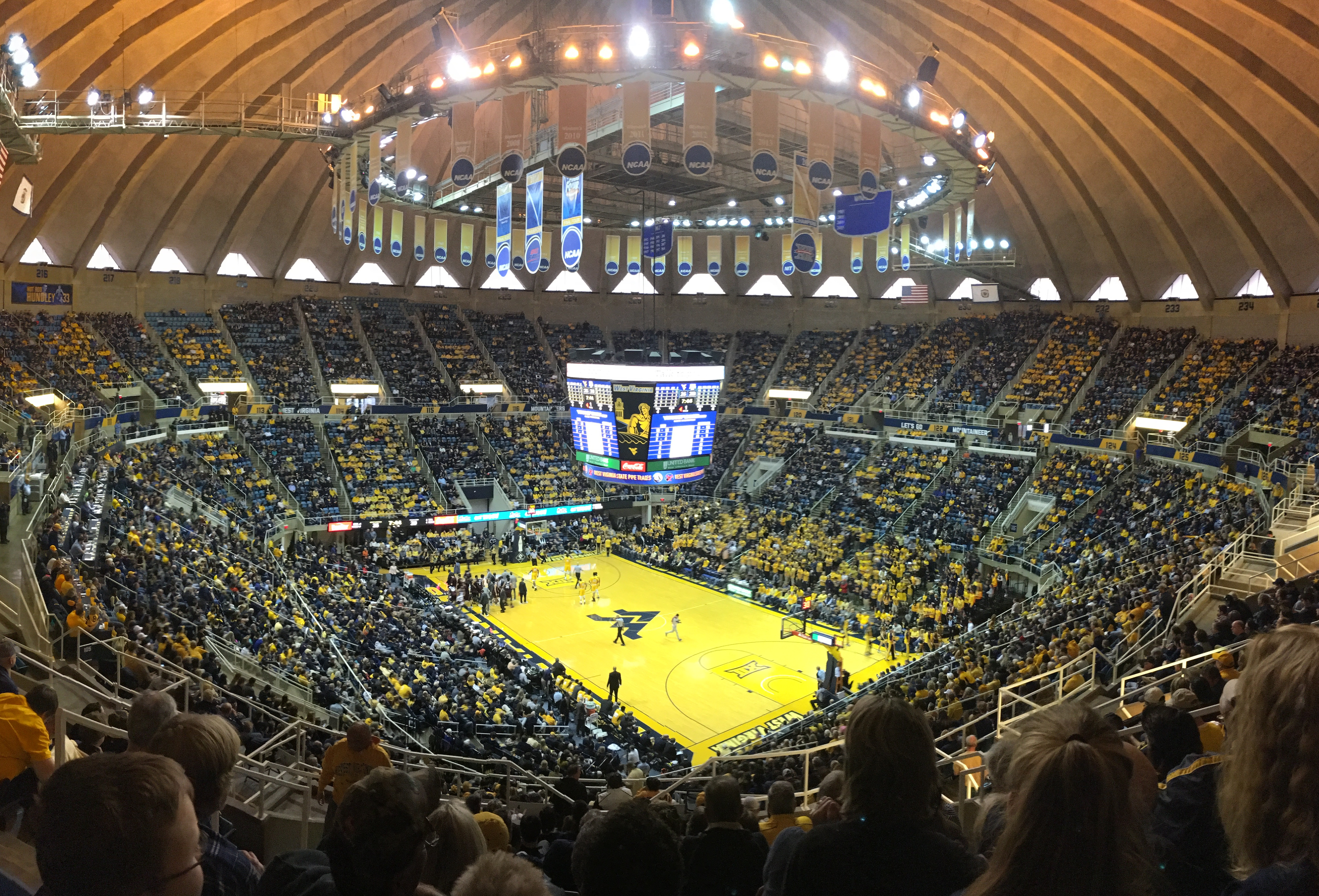
WVU Coliseum (West Virginia)

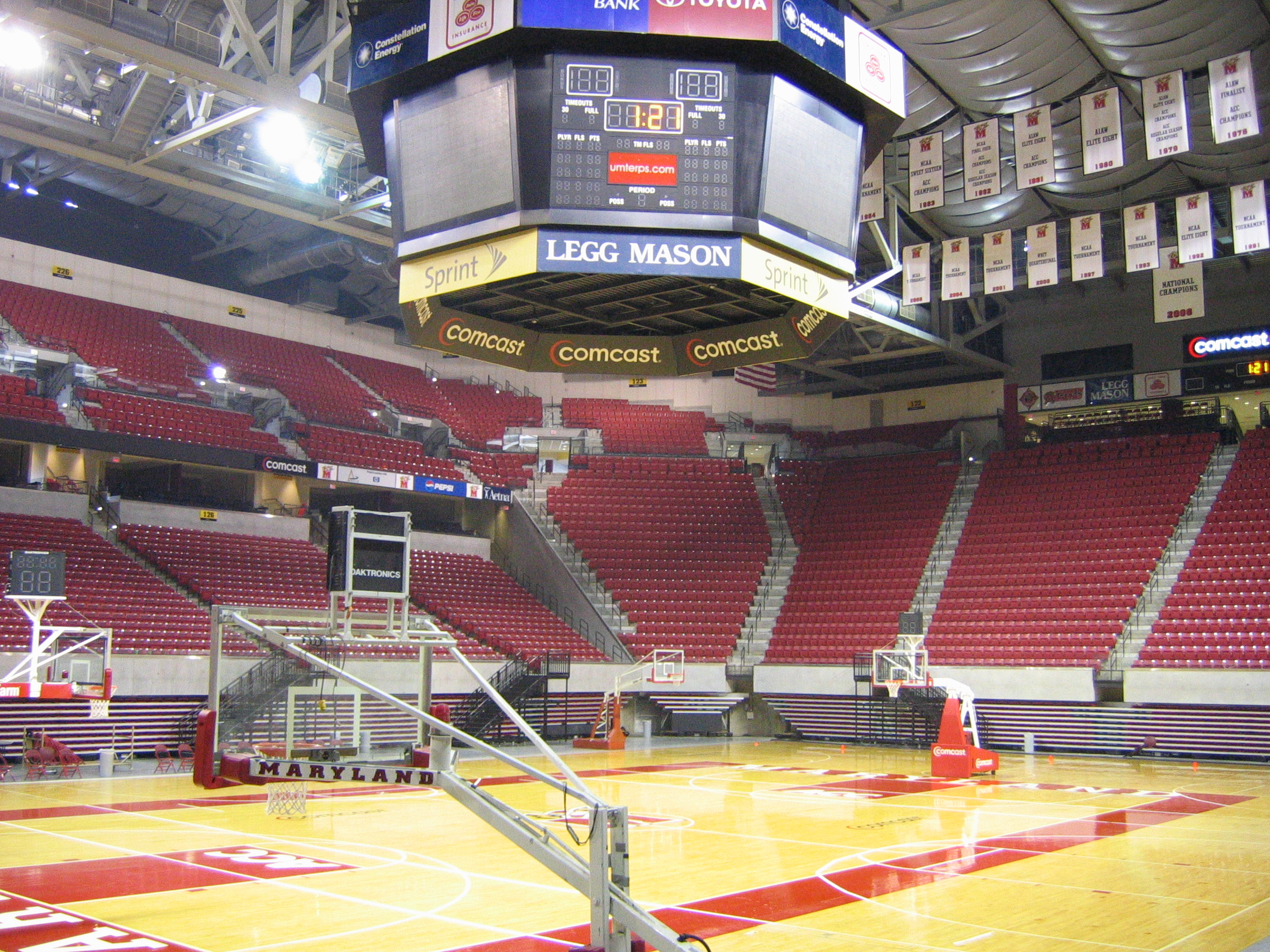
Xfinity Center (College Park, Maryland) (Maryland)

== See also ==
- List of NCAA Division II basketball arenas
- List of indoor arenas in the United States
- Lists of stadiums
