= List of Stony Brook Seawolves football seasons =

The Stony Brook Seawolves football team is the collegiate football team that represents Stony Brook University at the NCAA Division I level. The program participates in the Division I Football Championship Subdivision and currently competes in the twelve-member Colonial Athletic Association. The program plays its home games at Kenneth P. LaValle Stadium in Stony Brook, New York.

Stony Brook first fielded a varsity team at the Division III level in 1984 and rose to Division II in 1996. In 1999, the Seawolves became a Division I program, joining the Northeast Conference without offering scholarships until 2006. After a year of FCS independence, Stony Brook joined the Big South Conference and fully transitioned into a 63-scholarship program. In the summer of 2012, the program announced its admission into the Colonial Athletic Association.

== Seasons ==
Year	Coach	Overall	Conference	Standing	Bowl/playoffs	Coaches^{#}	AP^{°}
Stony Brook Patriots (NCAA Division III independent) (1984–1987)
1984	Sam Kornhauser	4–5					
1985	Sam Kornhauser	6–4					
1986	Sam Kornhauser	5–4					
1987	Sam Kornhauser	4–5					
Stony Brook Patriots (Liberty Football Conference) (1988–1991)
1988	Sam Kornhauser	5–4	4–2	3rd			
1989	Sam Kornhauser	3–7	1–4	T–5th			
1990	Sam Kornhauser	1–8	1–4	5th			
1991	Sam Kornhauser	6–4	2–3	4th			
Stony Brook Patriots/Seawolves (Freedom Football Conference) (1992–1995)
1992	Sam Kornhauser	6–4	2–3	5th			
1993	Sam Kornhauser	6–3	3–2	3rd			
1994	Sam Kornhauser	7–4	4–2	3rd			
1995	Sam Kornhauser	7–3	3–2	T–3rd			
Stony Brook Seawolves (NCAA Division III independent) (1996)
1996	Sam Kornhauser	6–4					
Stony Brook Seawolves (Eastern Football Conference) (1997–1998)
1997	Sam Kornhauser	4–6	4–4				
1998	Sam Kornhauser	3–7	3–5				
Stony Brook Seawolves (Northeast Conference) (1999–2005)
1999	Sam Kornhauser	5–5	4–3	4th			
2000	Sam Kornhauser	2–8	1–7	8th			
2001	Sam Kornhauser	3–6	3–5	T–5th			
2002	Sam Kornhauser	8–2	5–2	T–2nd			
2003	Sam Kornhauser	6–4	4–3	T–3rd			
2004	Sam Kornhauser	3–7	2–5	7th			
2005	Sam Kornhauser	6–4	5–2	T–1st			
Stony Brook Seawolves (Northeast Conference) (2006)
2006	Chuck Priore	5–6	5–2	2nd			
Stony Brook Seawolves (NCAA Division I FCS independent) (2007)
2007	Chuck Priore	6–5					
Stony Brook Seawolves (Big South Conference) (2008–2012)
2008	Chuck Priore	5–6	3–2	2nd			
2009	Chuck Priore	6–5	5–1	T–1st			
2010	Chuck Priore	6–5	5–1	T–1st			
2011	Chuck Priore	9–4	6–0	1st	L FCS Playoffs Second Round	18	16
2012	Chuck Priore	10–3	5–1	T–1st	L FCS Playoffs Second Round	10	13
Stony Brook Seawolves (Colonial Athletic Association) (2013–present)
2013	Chuck Priore	5–6	3–5	T–8th			
2014	Chuck Priore	5–7	4–4	T–5th			
2015	Chuck Priore	5–5	3–5	T–7th			
2016	Chuck Priore	5–6	4–4	T–6th			
2017	Chuck Priore	10–3	7–1	2nd	L FCS Playoffs Second Round	10	11
2018	Chuck Priore	7–5	5–3	T–3rd	L FCS Playoffs First Round	16	18
2019	Chuck Priore	5–7	2–6	11th			
2020	Chuck Priore	1–3	1–3	T–5th (North)			
2021	Chuck Priore	5–6	4–4	T–4th			
2022	Chuck Priore	2–9	1–7	T–12th			
2023	Chuck Priore	0–10	0–8	T–12th			
2024	Billy Cosh	8–4	5–3	T–6th			
2025	Billy Cosh	6–6	4–4	T–7th			
Sam Kornhauser:		105–110	57–62				
Chuck Priore:		97–101	63–57				
Billy Cosh:		14–10	9–7				
Total:		216–221 (.494)					
National championship Conference title Conference division title or championship game berth
