= 2024 Stony Brook Seawolves football team =

American college football season

2024 Stony Brook Seawolves football
- Conference: CAA Football

Ranking
- STATS: No. 24
- Record: 8–4 (5–3 CAA)
- Head coach: Billy Cosh (1st season)
- Offensive coordinator: Anthony Davis (1st season)
- Defensive coordinator: Scott Lewis (1st season)
- Home stadium: Kenneth P. LaValle Stadium

2024 Coastal Athletic Association Football Conference standings
	Conf.			Overall
Team	W		L	W		L
No. 15 Richmond +^	8	–	0	10	–	3
No. 9 Rhode Island* +^	7	–	1	11	–	3
No. 12 Villanova ^	6	–	2	10	–	4
Delaware*	6	–	2	9	–	2
No. 23 New Hampshire ^	6	–	2	8	–	5
Stony Brook	5	–	3	8	–	4
Towson	5	–	3	7	–	5
Elon	5	–	3	6	–	6
William & Mary	4	–	4	7	–	5
Monmouth	4	–	4	6	–	6
Maine	3	–	5	5	–	7
Albany	2	–	6	4	–	8
Hampton	2	–	6	5	–	7
Campbell	1	–	7	3	–	9
Bryant	0	–	8	2	–	10
North Carolina A&T	0	–	8	1	–	11
+ – Conference co-champions; ^ – FCS playoff participant; * Delaware ineligible for rankings and 2024 FCS playoffs due to transition to the FBS. Richmond and Rhode Island named co-champions as Rhode Island's only CAA loss was to Delaware.; Rankings from STATS Poll

The 2024 Stony Brook Seawolves football team represented Stony Brook University as a member of the Coastal Athletic Association Football Conference (CAA Football) during the 2024 NCAA Division I FCS football season. The Seawolves were led by first-year head coach Billy Cosh. Stony Brook played their home games at Kenneth P. LaValle Stadium located in Stony Brook, New York.

Under Cosh, Stony Brook recorded its most wins since 2017, its first winning season since 2018 and its highest FCS national ranking since 2018. He would win CAA Coach of the Year in his first season. Stony Brook started the year 8–2 before losing its final two games and being listed as one of the first four teams out of the 2024 FCS playoffs.

== Season ==
On November 13, 2023, Stony Brook fired head coach Chuck Priore after an 0–10 season, the first winless season in school history. Billy Cosh was hired as his successor on December 13.

On September 7, 2024, Stony Brook beat Stonehill 37–10, and it was the program's first win in 672 days.

On October 19, 2024, quarterback Tyler Knoop threw for six touchdowns in a 52–24 win over Towson, breaking the previous program single-game record of five. He went 34-for-40 with 387 yards, the fifth-most passing yards by a quarterback in Stony Brook history. Following the win, Stony Brook was ranked No. 24 in the FCS Coaches poll for the first time since 2019.

On October 26, 2024, Stony Brook defeated No. 16 William & Mary 35–13 on Homecoming. It was the program's first win over a ranked opponent since 2021.

On November 9, 2024, Stony Brook beat Albany 24–6 in the Battle for the Golden Apple to win the trophy for the first time since 2021.

== Schedule ==
Date	Time	Opponent	Rank	Site	TV	Result	Attendance
August 31	5:00 p.m.	at Marshall*		Joan C. Edwards Stadium; Huntington, WV	ESPN+	L 3–45	25,032
September 7	3:30 p.m.	Stonehill*		Kenneth P. LaValle Stadium; Stony Brook, NY	FloSports	W 37–10	8,062
September 14	1:00 p.m.	at Fordham*		Coffey Field; Bronx, NY	ESPN+	W 27–21	3,112
September 21	5:00 p.m.	at Campbell		Barker-Lane Stadium; Buies Creek, NC	FloSports	W 24–17	4,023
September 28	3:30 p.m.	Morgan State*		Kenneth P. LaValle Stadium; Stony Brook, NY	FloSports	W 22–3	4,818
October 5	3:30 p.m.	No. 6 Villanova		Kenneth P. LaValle Stadium; Stony Brook, NY	FloSports	L 24–42	6,142
October 19	1:00 p.m.	at Towson		Johnny Unitas Stadium; Towson, MD	FloSports	W 52–24	3,916
October 26	3:30 p.m.	No. 16 William & Mary^{†}		Kenneth P. LaValle Stadium; Stony Brook, NY	SNY	W 35–13	7,599
November 2	1:00 p.m.	at Bryant	No. 20	Beirne Stadium; Smithfield, RI	FloSports	W 31–30 ^{OT}	5,200
November 9	1:00 p.m.	Albany	No. 17	Kenneth P. LaValle Stadium; Stony Brook, NY	FloSports	W 24–6	5,717
November 16	1:00 p.m.	at New Hampshire	No. 16	Wildcat Stadium; Durham, NH	FloSports	L 30–31	4,760
November 23	1:00 p.m.	Monmouth	No. 18	Kenneth P. LaValle Stadium; Stony Brook, NY	FloSports	L 47–55	5,263
*Non-conference game; ^{†}Homecoming; Rankings from STATS Poll released prior to the game; All times are in Eastern time

== Game summaries ==
=== at Marshall (FBS) ===
Game One – Stony Brook Seawolves (0–0) at Marshall Thundering Herd (FBS) (0–0) – Game summary

Quarter	1	2	3	4	Total
Seawolves	0	0	3	0	3
Thundering Herd (FBS)	7	10	7	21	45

at Joan C. Edwards Stadium • Huntington, WV

- Date: August 31, 2024
- Game time: 5:00 PM
- Game weather: Sunny • Temperature: 76 °F (24 °C)
- Game attendance: 25,032
- Referee: Jeremy Parker
- TV announcers (ESPN+): Mark Martin (play-by-play) and Carl Lee (analyst)

Game information

First quarter

- (2:33) MRSH – A. J. Turner 80 yard run, Rece Verhoff kick (Drive: 1 play, 80 yards, 0:11; Marshall 7–0)

Second quarter

- (4:17) MRSH – Rece Verhoff 45 yard field goal (Drive: 10 plays, 42 yards, 4:11; Marshall 10–0)
- (1:38) MRSH – Elijah Metcalf 9 yard pass from Stone Earle, Rece Verhoff kick (Drive: 4 plays, 43 yards, 0:31; Marshall 17–0)

Third quarter

- (11:49) MRSH – Elijah Metcalf 28 yard pass from Stone Earle, Rece Verhoff kick (Drive: 9 plays, 75 yards, 3:11; Marshall 24–0)
- (4:15) SB – Enda Kirby 39 yard field goal (Drive: 12 plays, 39 yards, 4:52; Marshall 24–3)

Fourth quarter

- (14:07) MRSH – Christian Fitzpatrick 67 yard pass from Braylon Braxton, Rece Verhoff kick (Drive: 2 plays, 75 yards, 0:41; Marshall 31–3)
- (10:14) MRSH – Carl Chester 7 yard pass from Braylon Braxton, Rece Verhoff kick (Drive: 7 plays, 61 yards, 2:58; Marshall 38–3)
- (3:45) MRSH – Bralon Brown 16 yard pass from Cole Pennington, Rece Verhoff kick (Drive: 9 plays, 86 yards, 3:39; Marshall 45–3)

Statistics	STBK	MRSH
First downs	15	27
Plays–yards	80–252	68–549
Rushes–yards	47–94	36–259
Passing yards	158	290
Passing: Comp–Att–Int	18–33–1	21–32–0
Time of possession	35:38	24:22

Team	Category	Player	Statistics
Stony Brook	Passing	Malachi Marshall	10/20, 96 yards, 1 INT
Stony Brook	Rushing	Roland Dempster	13 carries, 37 yards
Stony Brook	Receiving	Jayce Freeman	2 receptions, 58 yards
Marshall	Passing	Braylon Braxton	7/11, 141 yards, 2 TD
Marshall	Rushing	A. J. Turner	8 carries, 119 yards, 1 TD
Marshall	Receiving	Christian Fitzpatrick	4 receptions, 97 yards, 1 TD

=== Stonehill ===
Game Two – Stonehill Skyhawks (0–0) vs Stony Brook Seawolves (0–1) – Game summary

Quarter	1	2	3	4	Total
Skyhawks	0	0	10	0	10
Seawolves	17	6	14	0	37

at Kenneth P. LaValle Stadium, Stony Brook, NY

- Date: Saturday September 7, 2024
- Game time: 3:30 PM
- Game weather: Sunny
- Game attendance: 8,062
- Referee: Cory Hansen
- TV announcers (FloSports): Jonny Wincott (play-by-play), Brandon London (analyst) and Nick DeLuca (sideline)

Game information

First quarter

- (13:06) SBU – Roland Dempster 17-yard run, Enda Kirby kick (Drive: 6 plays, 75 yards, 1:54; Stony Brook 7–0)
- (11:18) SBU – Roland Dempster 15-yard run, Enda Kirby kick (Drive: 2 plays, 30 yards, 0:27; Stony Brook 14–0)
- (6:43) SBU – Enda Kirby 40-yard field goal (Drive: 8 plays, 16 yards, 3:07; Stony Brook 17–0)

Second quarter

- (2:10) SBU – Cole Bunicci 63-yard pass from Malachi Marshall (Drive: 4 plays, 81 yards, 1:36; Stony Brook 23–0)

Third quarter

- (11:34) SHC – Danny Hurley 21-yard field goal (Drive: 10 plays, 71 yards, 3:26; Stony Brook 23–3)
- (7:52) SBU – Roland Dempster 3-yard run, Enda Kirby kick (Drive: 8 plays, 75 yards, 3:36; Stony Brook 30–3)
- (5:45) SBU – Sebastian Regis 69-yard fumble recovery, Enda Kirby kick (Stony Brook 37–3)
- (4:04) SHC – Cole Clark 3-yard pass from Ashur Carraha, Danny Hurley kick (Drive: 4 plays, 5 yards, 1:30; Stony Brook 37–10)

Fourth quarter

No scoring plays

Statistics	STO	STBK
First downs	21	20
Total yards	382	421
Rushing yards	146	260
Passing yards	236	161
Passing: Comp–Att–Int	18–36–2	9–16–0
Time of possession	29:26	29:06

Team	Category	Player	Statistics
Stonehill	Passing	Ashur Carraha	18/36, 236 yards, 2 INT, 1 TD
Stonehill	Rushing	Ashur Carraha	10 carries, 70 yards
Stonehill	Receiving	Cody Ruff	6 receptions, 105 yards
Stony Brook	Passing	Malachi Marshall	9/16, 161 yards, 1 TD
Stony Brook	Rushing	Roland Dempster	19 carries, 160 yards, 3 TD
Stony Brook	Receiving	Cole Bunicci	1 reception, 63 yards, 1 TD

=== at Fordham ===
Game Three – Stony Brook Seawolves (1–1) vs Fordham Rams (0–2) – Game summary

Quarter	1	2	3	4	Total
Seawolves	0	17	0	10	27
Rams	7	7	7	0	21

at Coffey Field, Bronx, NY

- Date: Saturday September 14, 2024
- Game time: 1:00 PM
- Game weather: Sunny • Temperature: 80 °F (27 °C) • Wind: NE at 8 miles per hour (13 km/h)
- Game attendance: 3,112
- Referee: Eric Lewis
- TV announcers (ESPN+): Andrew Bogusch (play-by-play) and Grant DelVecchio (analyst)

Game information

First quarter

- (2:05) FOR – C. J. Montes 11-yard run, Bennett Henderson kick (Drive: 8 plays, 78 yards, 3:22; Fordham 7–0)

Second quarter

- (14:19) SBU – Enda Kirby 34-yard field goal (Drive: 7 plays, 53 yards, 2:41; Fordham 7–3)
- (9:23) SBU – Jayden Cook 7-yard pass from Tyler Knoop, Enda Kirby kick (Drive: 9 plays, 74 yards, 3:37; Stony Brook 10–7)
- (6:49) FOR – Peter Chalhoub 6-yard interception, Bennett Henderson kick (Fordham 14–10)
- (1:36) SBU – Roland Dempster 1-yard run, Enda Kirby kick (Drive: 13 plays, 75 yards, 5:13; Stony Brook 17–14)

Third quarter

- (8:53) FOR – Alex Kemper 55-yard interception, Bennett Henderson kick (Fordham 21–17)

Fourth quarter

- (12:37) SBU – Brandon Boria 6-yard run, Enda Kirby kick (Drive: 6 plays, 80 yards, 2:16; Stony Brook 24–21)
- (8:34) SBU – Enda Kirby 41-yard field goal (Drive: 4 plays, 5 yards, 2:03; Stony Brook 27–21)

Statistics	STK	FOR
First downs	21	16
Total yards	432	257
Rushing yards	104	132
Passing yards	328	125
Passing: Comp–Att–Int	23–43–2	10–27–2
Time of possession	36:12	23:48

Team	Category	Player	Statistics
Stony Brook	Passing	Malachi Marshall	18/36, 268 yards, 1 INT
Stony Brook	Rushing	Brandon Boria	14 carries, 65 yards, 1 TD
Stony Brook	Receiving	R.J. Lamarre	7 receptions, 96 yards
Fordham	Passing	Jack Capaldi	6/18, 92 yards, 2 INT
Fordham	Rushing	Julius Loughridge	13 carries, 99 yards
Fordham	Receiving	K.J. Reed	3 receptions, 65 yards

=== at Campbell ===
Game Four – Stony Brook Seawolves (2–1) vs Campbell Fighting Camels (1–2) – Game summary

Quarter	1	2	3	4	Total
Seawolves	14	7	0	3	24
Fighting Camels	0	7	7	3	17

at Barker-Lane Stadium, Buies Creek, NC

- Date: Saturday September 21, 2024
- Game time: 5:00 PM
- Game weather: Sunny • Temperature: 83 °F (28 °C) • Wind: NW at 5 miles per hour (8.0 km/h)
- Game attendance: 4,023
- Referee: Tom Zetts
- TV announcers (FloSports): Evan Budrovich (play-by-play) and Jay Sonnhalter (analyst)

Game information

First quarter

- (11:04) SBU – Roland Dempster 2-yard run, Enda Kirby kick (Drive: 11 plays, 75 yards, 3:56; Stony Brook 7–0)
- (10:23) SBU – Roland Dempster 3-yard run, Enda Kirby kick (Drive: 2 plays, 9 yards, 0:37; Stony Brook 14–0)

Second quarter

- (10:10) SBU – Johnny Martin III 1-yard run, Enda Kirby kick (Drive: 10 plays, 57 yards, 4:35; Stony Brook 21–0)
- (6:06) CAM – Aiden Valdez 5-yard pass from Mike Chandler II, Connor Lytton kick (Drive: 8 plays, 66 yards, 4:00; Stony Brook 21–7)

Third quarter

- (11:38) CAM – Aiden Valdez 37-yard pass from Chad Mascoe, Connor Lytton kick (Drive: 7 plays, 75 yards, 3:22; Stony Brook 21–14)

Fourth quarter

- (2:06) SBU – Enda Kirby 39-yard field goal (Drive: 10 plays, 53 yards, 4:51; Stony Brook 24–14)
- (0:31) CAM – Connor Lytton 30-yard field goal (Drive: 9 plays, 59 yards, 1:31; Stony Brook 24–17)

Statistics	STBK	CAM
First downs	24	18
Total yards	384	336
Rushing yards	227	158
Passing yards	157	178
Passing: Comp–Att–Int	13–31–0	12–22–0
Time of possession	36:39	23:21

Team	Category	Player	Statistics
Stony Brook	Passing	Malachi Marshall	13/30, 157 yards
Stony Brook	Rushing	Roland Dempster	36 carries, 179 yards, 2 TD
Stony Brook	Receiving	Cole Bunicci	2 receptions, 35 yards
Campbell	Passing	Chad Mascoe	9/14, 160 yards, 1 TD
Campbell	Rushing	Allen Mitchell	5 carries, 46 yards
Campbell	Receiving	Sincere Brown	6 receptions, 63 yards

=== Morgan State ===
Game Five – Morgan State Bears (2–2) at Stony Brook Seawolves (3–1) – Game summary

Quarter	1	2	3	4	Total
Bears	3	0	0	0	3
Seawolves	0	16	6	0	22

at Kenneth P. LaValle Stadium • Stony Brook, NY

- Date: Saturday September 28, 2024
- Game time: 3:30 PM EST
- Game weather: Cloudy
- Game attendance: 4,818
- Referee: Alexander Randolph
- TV announcers (FloSports): Jonny Wincott (play-by-play), Brandon London (analyst) and Matt Levine (sideline)

Game information

First quarter

- (1:16) MORG – Beckett Leary 25-yard field goal (Drive: 7 plays, 74 yards, 3:29; Morgan State 3–0)

Second quarter

- (13:18) SBU – Roland Dempster 2-yard run (Drive: 9 plays, 72 yards, 2:54; Stony Brook 6–3)
- (6:34) SBU – Enda Kirby 28-yard field goal (Drive: 8 plays, 54 yards, 3:12; Stony Brook 9–3)
- (0:32) SBU – Roland Dempster 1-yard run, Enda Kirby kick (Drive: 8 plays, 44 yards, 2:35; Stony Brook 16–3)

Third quarter

- (9:22) SBU – Roland Dempster 4-yard run (Drive: 8 plays, 55 yards, 3:15; Stony Brook 22–3)

Fourth quarter

No scoring plays

Statistics	MORG	STBK
First downs	17	20
Total yards	259	428
Rushing yards	146	287
Passing yards	113	141
Passing: Comp–Att–Int	16–22–0	11–20–0
Time of possession	28:31	31:29

Team	Category	Player	Statistics
Morgan State	Passing	Duce Taylor	11/17, 70 yards
Morgan State	Rushing	Myles Miree	11 carries, 75 yards
Morgan State	Receiving	Malique Leatherbury	4 receptions, 25 yards
Stony Brook	Passing	Malachi Marshall	9/18, 132 yards
Stony Brook	Rushing	Roland Dempster	25 carries, 158 yards, 3 TD
Stony Brook	Receiving	Cal Redman	4 receptions, 62 yards

=== No. 6 Villanova ===
Game Six – No. 6 Villanova Wildcats (4–1) at Stony Brook Seawolves (4–1) – Game summary

Quarter	1	2	3	4	Total
No. 6 Wildcats	7	7	14	14	42
Seawolves	7	10	7	0	24

at Kenneth P. LaValle Stadium • Stony Brook, NY

- Date: Saturday October 5, 2024
- Game time: 3:30 PM EST
- Game weather: Sunny
- Game attendance: 6,142
- Referee: Paul Matt Overton
- TV announcers (FloSports): Jonny Wincott (play-by-play), Brandon London (analyst) and Matt Levine (sideline)

Game information

First quarter

- (9:24) SBU – Roland Dempster 9-yard run, Enda Kirby kick (Drive: 3 plays, 19 yards, 0:53; Stony Brook 7–0)
- (0:00) VIL – Lucas Kopecky 26-yard pass from Connor Watkins, Ethan Gettman kick (Drive: 6 plays, 92 yards, 3:03; Tied 7–7)

Second quarter

- (10:13) SBU – Roland Dempster 2-yard run, Enda Kirby kick (Drive: 11 plays, 75 yards, 4:47; Stony Brook 14–7)
- (3:03) VIL – David Avit 1-yard run, Ethan Gettman kick (Drive: 6 plays, 70 yards, 2:36; Tied 14–14)
- (0:00) SBU – Enda Kirby 24-yard field goal (Drive: 4 plays, 1 yard, 1:33; Stony Brook 17–14)

Third quarter

- (10:05) SBU – Roland Dempster 1-yard run, Enda Kirby kick (Drive: 9 plays, 66 yards, 4:48; Stony Brook 24–14)
- (7:08) VIL – David Avit 1-yard run, Ethan Gettman kick (Drive: 2 plays, 26 yards, 0:42; Stony Brook 24–21)
- (3:47) VIL – David Avit 59-yard run, Ethan Gettman kick (Drive: 3 plays, 80 yards, 1:22; Villanova 28–24)

Fourth quarter

- (8:40) VIL – David Avit 72-yard run, Ethan Gettman kick (Drive: 1 play, 72 yards, 0:11; Villanova 35–24)
- (2:26) VIL – Ja'briel Mace 21-yard run, Ethan Gettman kick (Drive: 9 plays, 64 yards, 5:05; Villanova 42–24)

Statistics	VILL	STBK
First downs	19	18
Total yards	432	310
Rushing yards	280	163
Passing yards	152	147
Passing: Comp–Att–Int	9–19–0	22–32–1
Time of possession	28:02	31:58

Team	Category	Player	Statistics
Villanova	Passing	Connor Watkins	9/19, 152 yards, TD
Villanova	Rushing	David Avit	13 carries, 183 yards, 4 TD
Villanova	Receiving	Jaylan Sanchez	3 receptions, 38 yards
Stony Brook	Passing	Tyler Knoop	22/32, 147 yards, INT
Stony Brook	Rushing	Roland Dempster	24 carries, 115 yards, 3 TD
Stony Brook	Receiving	Cal Redman	3 receptions, 50 yards

=== at Towson ===
Game Seven – Stony Brook Seawolves (4–2) vs Towson Tigers (3–3) – Game summary

Quarter	1	2	3	4	Total
Seawolves	14	14	10	14	52
Tigers	7	10	0	7	24

at Johnny Unitas Stadium, Towson, MD

- Date: Saturday October 19, 2024
- Game time: 1:00 PM EST
- Game weather: Sunny
- Game attendance: 3,916
- Referee: Bill McKeevar
- TV announcers (FloSports): Spiro Morekas (play-by-play), Gordy Combs (analyst)

Game information

First quarter

- (14:49) TOW – Devin Matthews 75-yard run, Keegan Vaughan kick (Drive: 1 play, 75 yards, 0:11; Stony Brook 7–0)
- (6:32) SBU – Jasiah Williams 10-yard pass from Tyler Knoop, Enda Kirby kick (Drive: 7 plays, 93 yards, 3:35; Tied 7–7)
- (3:12) SBU – Jasiah Williams 19-yard pass from Tyler Knoop, Enda Kirby kick (Drive: 4 plays, 54 yards, 1:51; Stony Brook 14–7)

Second quarter

- (14:09) TOW – Keegan Vaughan 30-yard field goal (Drive: 13 plays, 62 yards, 4:03; Stony Brook 14–10)
- (11:46) TOW – Tyrell Greene Jr. 1-yard run, Keegan Vaughan kick (Drive: 1 play, 1 yard, 0:04; Towson 17–14)
- (4:24) SBU – Cal Redman 7-yard pass from Tyler Knoop, Enda Kirby kick (Drive: 7 plays, 55 yards, 2:09; Stony Brook 21–17)
- (0:40) SBU – Jayce Freeman 21-yard pass from Tyler Knoop, Enda Kirby kick (Drive: 9 plays, 98 yards, 1:37; Stony Brook 28–17)

Third quarter

- (11:35) SBU – Jayce Freeman 22-yard pass from Tyler Knoop, Enda Kirby kick (Drive: 7 plays, 75 yards, 3:25; Stony Brook 35–17)
- (0:08) SBU – Enda Kirby 29-yard field goal (Drive: 16 plays, 84 yards, 9:17; Stony Brook 38–17)

Fourth quarter

- (12:57) SBU – Jasiah Williams 20-yard pass from Tyler Knoop, Enda Kirby kick (Drive: 1 play, 20 yards, 0:06; Stony Brook 45–17)
- (3:03) SBU – Johnny Martin 5-yard run, Enda Kirby kick (Drive: 12 plays, 55 yards, 8:24; Stony Brook 52–17)
- (0:14) TOW – Ike Daniels 35-yard run, Keegan Vaughan kick (Drive: 7 plays, 75 yards, 2:49; Stony Brook 52–24)

Statistics	STBK	TOW
First downs	30	15
Total yards	512	405
Rushing yards	125	247
Passing yards	387	158
Passing: Comp–Att–Int	34–40–0	12–20–1
Time of possession	37:04	22:56

Team	Category	Player	Statistics
Stony Brook	Passing	Tyler Knoop	34/40, 387 yards, 6 TD
Stony Brook	Rushing	Roland Dempster	16 carries, 103 yards
Stony Brook	Receiving	Jasiah Williams	9 receptions, 92 yards, 3 TD
Towson	Passing	Sean Brown	12/20, 158 yards, INT
Towson	Rushing	Tyrell Greene Jr.	16 carries, 115 yards, TD
Towson	Receiving	John Dunmore	3 receptions, 60 yards

=== No. 16 William & Mary ===
Game Eight – William & Mary Tribe (5–2) vs Stony Brook Seawolves (5–2) – Game summary

Quarter	1	2	3	4	Total
No. 16 Tribe	6	7	0	0	13
Seawolves	7	14	7	7	35

at Kenneth P. LaValle Stadium, Stony Brook, NY

- Date: Saturday October 26, 2024
- Game time: 3:30 PM EST
- Game weather: Sunny
- Game attendance: 7,599
- Referee: Todd Bowman
- TV announcers (SNY): Jonny Wincott (play-by-play), Brandon London (analyst) and Matt Levine (sideline)

Game information

First quarter

- (12:54) SBU – Jayce Freeman 70-yard pass from Tyler Knoop, Enda Kirby kick (Drive: 1 play, 70 yards, 0:10; Stony Brook 7–0)
- (0:13) W&M – Darius Wilson 1-yard run (Drive: 6 plays, 45 yards, 2:29; Stony Brook 7–6)

Second quarter

- (14:57) SBU – Roland Dempster 1-yard run, Enda Kirby kick (Drive: 8 plays, 56 yards, 3:22; Stony Brook 14–6)
- (3:46) SBU – A.J. Roberts 15-yard interception, Enda Kirby kick (Stony Brook 21–6)
- (0:34) W&M – Darius Wilson 28-yard run, Eric Bernstein kick (Drive: 5 plays, 82 yards, 0:47; Stony Brook 21–13)

Third quarter

- (8:23) SBU – Cal Redman 17-yard pass from Tyler Knoop, Enda Kirby kick (Drive: 13 plays, 75 yards, 6:37; Stony Brook 28–13)

Fourth quarter

- (9:31) SBU – Roland Dempster 3-yard run, Enda Kirby kick (Drive: 6 plays, 48 yards, 3:01; Stony Brook 35–13)

Statistics	W&M	STBK
First downs	15	23
Total yards	354	462
Rushing yards	120	222
Passing yards	234	240
Passing: Comp–Att–Int	17–26–4	15–26–1
Time of possession	27:19	32:41

Team	Category	Player	Statistics
William & Mary	Passing	Darius Wilson	14/19, 197 yards, 3 INT
William & Mary	Rushing	Bronson Yoder	14 carries, 65 yards
William & Mary	Receiving	JT Mayo	3 receptions, 67 yards
Stony Brook	Passing	Tyler Knoop	15/26, 240 yards, 2 TD, INT
Stony Brook	Rushing	Roland Dempster	27 carries, 144 yards, 2 TD
Stony Brook	Receiving	Jayce Freeman	3 receptions, 101 yards, TD

=== Bryant ===
Game Nine – No. 20 Stony Brook Seawolves (6–2) vs Bryant Bulldogs (2–6) – Game summary

Quarter	1	2	3	4	OT	Total
No. 20 Seawolves	10	7	7	0	7	31
Bulldogs	0	7	10	7	6	30

at Beirne Stadium, Smithfield, RI

- Date: Saturday November 2, 2024
- Game time: 1:00 PM EST
- Game weather: Sunny
- Game attendance: 5,200
- Referee: Todd Boys
- TV announcers (FloSports): Jake Zimmer (play-by-play) and Tim Lynch (analyst)

Game information

First quarter

- (11:11) SBU – Roland Dempster 5-yard run, Enda Kirby Kick (Drive: 9 plays, 75 yards, 3:49; Stony Brook 7–0)
- (5:04) SBU – Enda Kirby 36-yard field goal (Drive: 9 plays, 42 yards, 2:51; Stony Brook 10–0)

Second quarter

- (6:07) BRY – Landon Ruggieri 15-yard pass from Brennan Myer, Bryce Soli kick (Drive: 14 plays, 99 yards, 6:44; Stony Brook 10–7)
- (1:55) SBU – Johnny Martin 1-yard rn, Enda Kirby kick (Drive: 9 plays, 69 yards, 4:06; Stony Brook 17–7)

Third quarter

- (11:02) BRY – Bryce Soli 30-yard field goal (Drive: 9 plays, 62 yards, 3:58; Stony Brook 17–10)
- (9:16) SBU – Jayce Freeman 40-yard pass from Tyler Knoop, Enda Kirby kick (Drive: 5 plays, 69 yards, 1:40; Stony Brook 24–10)
- (9:04) BRY – Markiel Cockrell 75-yard run, Bryce Soli kick (Drive: 1 play, 75 yards, 0:12; Stony Brook 24–17)

Fourth quarter

- (13:32) BRY – Tristen Riley 19-yard pass from Brennan Myer, Bryce Soli kick (Drive: 3 plays, 25 yards, 1:15; Tied 24–24)

Overtime

- SBU – Roland Dempster 2-yard run, Enda Kirby kick (Drive: 4 plays, 25 yards; Stony Brook 31–24)
- BRY – Landon Ruggieri 25-yard pass from Brennan Myer, two-point conversion failed (Drive: 1 plays, 25 yards; Stony Brook 31–30)

Statistics	STBK	BRY
First downs	26	21
Total yards	432	443
Rushing yards	147	105
Passing yards	285	338
Passing: Comp–Att–Int	23–30–0	28–40–1
Time of possession	31:57	28:03

Team	Category	Player	Statistics
Stony Brook	Passing	Tyler Knoop	23/30, 285 yards, TD
Stony Brook	Rushing	Roland Dempster	25 carries, 107 yards, 2 TD
Stony Brook	Receiving	Jasiah Williams	10 receptions, 96 yards
Bryant	Passing	Brennan Myer	28/39, 338 yards, 3 TD, INT
Bryant	Rushing	Markiel Cockrell	4 carries, 79 yards, TD
Bryant	Receiving	Dylan Kedzior	9 receptions, 100 yards

=== Albany (rivalry) ===
Game Ten – Albany Great Danes (3–6) vs No. 17 Stony Brook Seawolves (7–2) – Game summary

Quarter	1	2	3	4	Total
Great Danes	0	6	0	0	6
No. 17 Seawolves	7	0	3	14	24

at Kenneth P. LaValle Stadium, Stony Brook, NY

- Date: Saturday November 9, 2024
- Game time: 1:00 PM EST
- Game weather: 50 °F (10 °C)
- Game attendance: 5,717
- Referee: Justin Ackley
- TV announcers (FloSports): Jonny Wincott (play-by-play), Brandon London (analyst) and Matt Levine (sideline)

Game information

First quarter

- (10:29) SBU – Roland Dempster 2-yard run, Enda Kirby kick (Drive: 10 plays, 80 yards, 2:14; Stony Brook 7–0)

Second quarter

- (13:39) ALB – Caden Burti 23-yard pass from Van Weber, John Opalko PAT failed (Drive: 6 plays, 51 yards, 2:55; Stony Brook 7–6)

Third quarter

- (8:49) SBU – Enda Kirby 41-yard field goal (Drive: 5 plays, 21 yards, 1:49; Stony Brook 10–6)

Fourth quarter

- (11:51) SBU – Jayce Freeman 20-yard pass from Tyler Knoop, Enda Kirby kick (Drive: 10 plays, 90 yards, 5:04; Stony Brook 17–6)
- (2:41) SBU – Roland Dempster 4-yard run, Enda Kirby kick (Drive: 6 plays, 33 yards, 3:54; Stony Brook 24–6)

Statistics	ALB	STBK
First downs	17	15
Total yards	365	321
Rushing yards	153	92
Passing yards	212	229
Passing: Comp–Att–Int	23–36–1	19–32–0
Time of possession	32:29	27:31

Team	Category	Player	Statistics
Albany	Passing	Van Weber	20/31, 201 yards, TD, INT
Albany	Rushing	Jojo Uga	17 carries, 56 yards
Albany	Receiving	Caden Burti	4 receptions, 68 yards, TD
Stony Brook	Passing	Tyler Knoop	19/32, 229 yards, TD
Stony Brook	Rushing	Roland Dempster	26 carries, 98 yards, 2 TD
Stony Brook	Receiving	Jasiah Williams	7 receptions, 74 yards, TD

=== at New Hampshire ===
Game Eleven – No. 16 Stony Brook Seawolves (8–2) vs New Hampshire Wildcats (6–4) – Game summary

Quarter	1	2	3	4	Total
No. 16 Seawolves	3	10	10	7	30
Wildcats	0	10	0	21	31

at Wildcat Stadium, Durham, NH

- Date: Saturday November 16, 2024
- Game time: 1:00 PM EST
- Game weather: Sunny, 55 °F (13 °C)
- Game attendance: 4,760
- Referee: Tom Zetts
- TV announcers (FloSports): Joel Wiel (play-by-play) and Evan Gray (analyst)

Game information

First quarter

- (4:08) SBU – Enda Kirby 24-yard field goal (Drive: 6 plays, 19 yards, 1:35; Stony Brook 3–0)

Second quarter

- (14:54) SBU – Enda Kirby 22-yard field goal (Drive: 4 plays, 4 yards, 1:13; Stony Brook 6–0)
- (11:06) UNH – Logan Tomlinson 5-yard pass from Seth Morgan, Nick Mazzie kick (Drive: 7 plays, 60 yards, 3:39; New Hampshire 7–6)
- (9:42) SBU – Jayce Freeman 30-yard pass from Tyler Knoop, Enda Kirby kick (Drive: 4 plays, 75 yards, 1:24; Stony Brook 13–7)
- (0:22) UNH – Nick Mazzie 22-yard field goal (Drive: 7 plays, 46 yards, 1:20; Stony Brook 13–10)

Third quarter

- (10:24) SBU – Cal Redman 14-yard pass from Tyler Knoop, Enda Kirby kick (Drive: 11 plays, 61 yards, 4:30; Stony Brook 20–10)
- (5:49) SBU – Enda Kirby 37-yard field goal (Drive: 10 plays, 41 yards, 3:02; Stony Brook 23–10)

Fourth quarter

- (14:56) SBU – Cole Bunicci 13-yard pass from Tyler Knoop, Enda Kirby kick (Drive: 9 plays, 67 yards, 4:01; Stony Brook 30–10)
- (12:24) UNH – Seth Morgan 24-yard run, Nick Mazzie kick (Drive: 8 plays, 55 yards, 2:26; Stony Brook 30–17)
- (9:37) UNH – Denzell Gibson 2-yard run, Nick Mazzie kick (Drive: 5 plays, 13 yards, 1:28; Stony Brook 30–24)
- (6:15) UNH – Joey Corcoran 15-yard pass from Seth Morgan kick, Nick Mazzie kick (Drive: 3 plays, 53 yards, 1:28; New Hampshire 31–30)

Statistics	STBK	UNH
First downs	17	21
Total yards	326	326
Rushing yards	132	63
Passing yards	194	263
Passing: Comp–Att–Int	17–27–0	27–40–1
Time of possession	24:55	35:05

Team	Category	Player	Statistics
Stony Brook	Passing	Tyler Knoop	17/27, 194 yards, 3 TD
Stony Brook	Rushing	Roland Dempster	21 carries, 85 yards
Stony Brook	Receiving	Cal Redman	5 receptions, 66 yards, TD
New Hampshire	Passing	Seth Morgan	27/40, 263 yards, 2 TD, INT
New Hampshire	Rushing	Denzell Gibson	17 carries, 64 yards, TD
New Hampshire	Receiving	Caleb Burke	6 receptions, 74 yards

=== Monmouth ===
Game Twelve – Monmouth Hawks (5–6) at No. 18 Stony Brook Seawolves (8–3) – Game summary

Quarter	1	2	3	4	Total
Hawks	14	28	7	6	55
No. 18 Seawolves	13	17	14	3	47

at Kenneth P. LaValle Stadium • Stony Brook, NY

- Date: Saturday November 23, 2024
- Game time: 1:00 PM EST
- Game weather: Cloudy, 47 °F (8 °C)
- Game attendance: 5,263
- Referee: Jeremy DeAngulo
- TV announcers (FloSports): Jonny Wincott (play-by-play), Brandon London (analyst) and Matt Levine (sideline)

Game information

First quarter

- (11:46) MON – Marcus Middleton 3-yard pass from Derek Robertson, Michael Calton Jr. kick (Drive: 9 plays, 75 yards, 3:14; Monmouth 7–0)
- (8:25) SBU – Enda Kirby 27-yard field goal (Drive: 9 plays, 71 yards, 3:19; Monmouth 7–3)
- (7:29) SBU – Brandon Boria 4-yard punt return, Enda Kirby (Stony Brook 10–7)
- (6:10) MON – Tra Neal 51-yard pass from Derek Robertson, Michael Calton Jr. kick (Drive: 5 plays, 75 yards, 1:19; Monmouth 14–10)
- (2:53) SBU – Enda Kirby 25-yard field goal (Drive: 8 plays, 54 yards, 3:13; Monmouth 14–13)

Second quarter

- (14:57) MON – Stone Ntoh 5-yard run, Michael Calton Jr. kick (Drive: 10 plays, 75 yards, 2:56; Monmouth 21–13)
- (10:03) SBU – Roland Dempster 13-yard pass from Tyler Knoop, Enda Kirby kick (Drive: 9 plays, 75 yards, 4:54; Monmouth 21–20)
- (8:54) MON – Derek Robertson 42-yard pass from Derek Robertson, Michael Calton Jr. kick (Drive: 3 plays, 75 yards, 1:03; Monmouth 28–20)
- (5:46) MON – Rodney Nelson 13-yard run, Michael Calton Jr. kick (Drive: 5 plays, 60 yards, 1:32; Monmouth 35–20)
- (1:54) SBU – Cal Redman 21-yard pass from Tyler Knoop, Enda Kirby kick (Drive: 9 plays, 65 yards, 3:52; Monmouth 35–27)
- (0:58) MON – Stone Ntoh 1-yard run, Michael Calton Jr. kick (Drive: 6 plays, 75 yards, 0:51; Monmouth 42–27)
- (0:00) SBU – Enda Kirby 35-yard field goal (Drive: 8 plays, 58 yards, 0:58; Monmouth 42–30)

Third quarter

- (10:54) SBU – Dez Williams 17-yard pass from Tyler Knoop, Enda Kirby kick (Drive: 10 plays, 75 yards, 4:06; Monmouth 42–37)
- (8:20) MON – Rodney Nelson 8-yard run, Michael Calton Jr. kick (Drive: 5 plays, 75 yards, 2:28; Monmouth 49–37)
- (1:26) SBU – Dez Williams 23-yard pass from Tyler Knoop, Enda Kirby kick (Drive: 8 plays, 54 yards, 3:14; Monmouth 49–44)

Fourth quarter

- (3:07) MON – Jack Neri 40-yard pass from Tra Neal (Drive: 3 plays, 58 yards, 1:29; Monmouth 55–44)
- (1:42) SBU – Enda Kirby 34-yard field goal (Drive: 7 plays, 37 yards, 1:20; Monmouth 55–47)

Statistics	MONM	STBK
First downs	31	31
Total yards	690	559
Rushing yards	114	128
Passing yards	576	431
Passing: Comp–Att–Int	29–46–0	38–55–1
Time of possession	25:49	34:11

Team	Category	Player	Statistics
Monmouth	Passing	Derek Robertson	28/45, 536 yards, 3 TD
Monmouth	Rushing	Rodney Nelson	8 carries, 44 yards, 2 TD
Monmouth	Receiving	TJ Speight	7 receptions, 151 yards
Stony Brook	Passing	Tyler Knoop	37/53, 408 yards, 3 TD, INT
Stony Brook	Rushing	Roland Dempster	20 carries, 95 yards
Stony Brook	Receiving	Daz Williams	11 receptions, 134 yards, 2 TD

== Ranking movements ==
Ranking movements Legend: ██ Increase in ranking ██ Decrease in ranking — = Not ranked RV = Received votes
	Week													
Poll	Pre	1	2	3	4	5	6	7	8	9	10	11	12	Final
STATS FCS	—	—	—	—	RV	RV	RV	RV	RV	20	17	16	18	
Coaches	—	—	—	—	RV	RV	RV	RV	24	20	18	17	20	
