= Miguel Maysonet =

American football player (born 1989)

Profile
- Position: Running back

Personal information
- Born: December 13, 1989 (age 36); Puerto Rico
- Listed height: 5 ft 10 in (1.78 m)
- Listed weight: 210 lb (95 kg)

Career information
- High school: Riverhead (NY)
- College: Stony Brook
- NFL draft: 2013: undrafted

Career history
- Philadelphia Eagles (2013)*; Cleveland Browns (2013)*; Indianapolis Colts (2013)*; San Diego Chargers (2013)*; New York Jets (2013)*; Washington Redskins (2013)*; Pittsburgh Steelers (2014)*; Buffalo Bills (2015)*
- * Offseason or practice squad member only
- Stats at Pro Football Reference

Miguel Maysonet (born December 13, 1989) is a former American football running back. He was signed by the Philadelphia Eagles as an undrafted free agent in 2013. He played college football at Stony Brook.

== Early life ==
He attended Riverhead High School. He was named 2009 New York State Gatorade Player of the Year. He won the 2008 Hansen Award in which names the top football player in Suffolk County.

During a game against winless Smithtown East, he did fumble once caused by Defensive Tackle Alex Coymen

== Professional career ==
=== 2013 NFL Combine ===
Pre-draft measurables
Height	Weight	40-yard dash	10-yard split	20-yard split	20-yard shuttle	Three-cone drill	Vertical jump	Broad jump	Bench press
5 ft 9 in (1.75 m)	209 lb (95 kg)	4.62 s	1.56 s	2.71 s	4.31 s	7.01 s	31.5 in (0.80 m)	8 ft 11 in (2.72 m)	21 reps
All values from NFL Combine

=== Philadelphia Eagles ===
On April 27, 2013, Maysonet signed with the Philadelphia Eagles as an undrafted free agent. On May 20, he was released by the Eagles.

=== Cleveland Browns ===
On May 21, 2013, Maysonet was claimed off waivers by the Cleveland Browns. He was later released by the Browns on August 31.

=== Indianapolis Colts ===
On September 16, 2013, Maysonet was signed to the Indianapolis Colts' practice squad, but was released on September 26.

=== San Diego Chargers ===
On October 1, 2013, Maysonet was signed by the San Diego Chargers to their practice squad. He was released by San Diego on October 9.

=== New York Jets ===
Maysonet was signed to the New York Jets' practice squad on October 15, 2013. He was released by New York on October 22.

=== Washington Redskins ===
On December 10, 2013, Maysonet signed with the Washington Redskins' practice squad.

=== Pittsburgh Steelers ===
On January 7, 2014, Maysonet signed with the Pittsburgh Steelers on a reserve/future contract. The Steelers released Maysonet on August 26.

=== Buffalo Bills ===
On October 16, 2015, Maysonet was signed by the Buffalo Bills to their practice squad. On November 3, he was released by Buffalo.
