= Timon Parris =

American football player (born 1995)

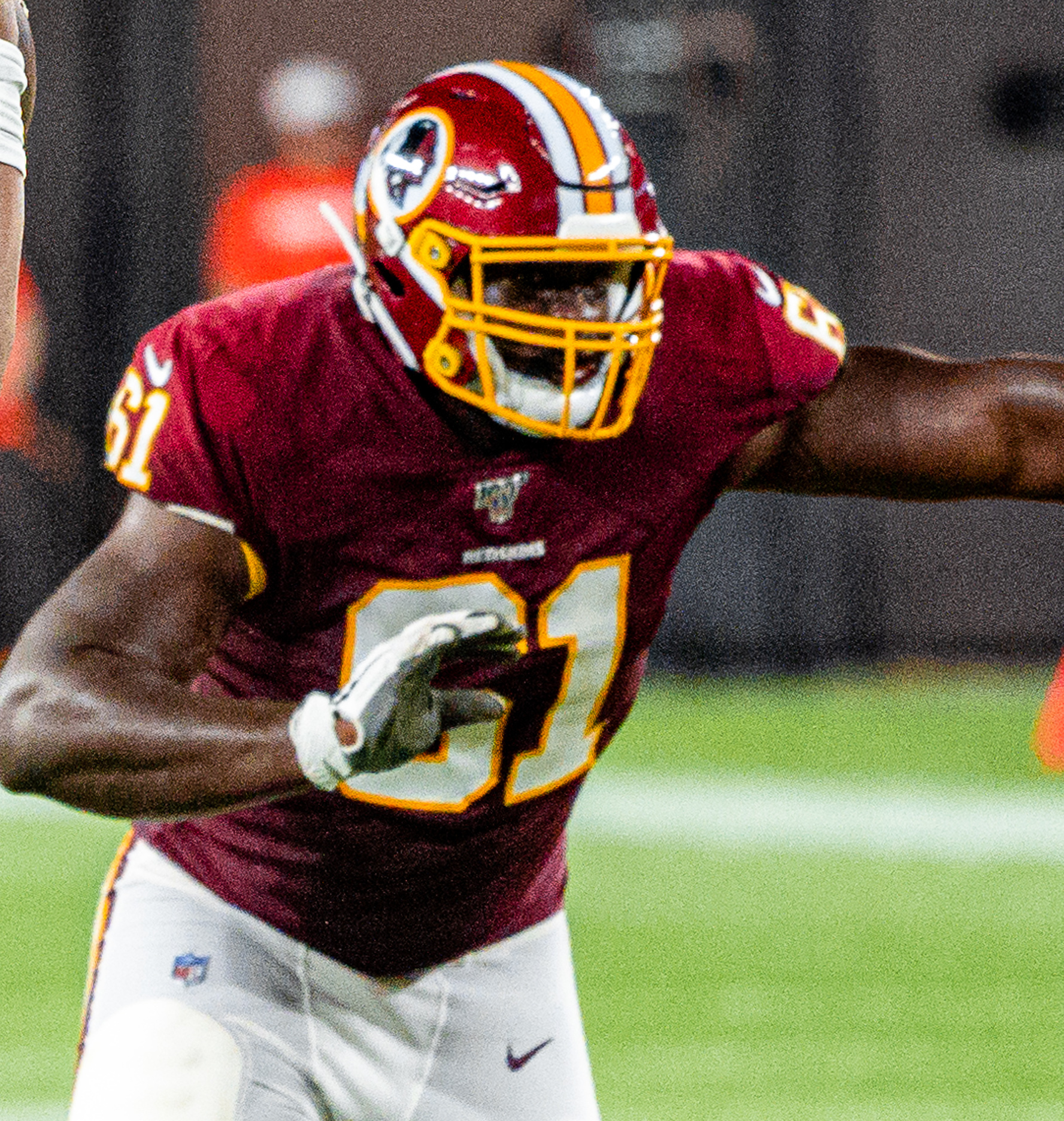
- Parris with the Washington Redskins in 2019

Profile
- Position: Offensive tackle

Personal information
- Born: September 11, 1995 (age 31); Elmont, New York, U.S.
- Listed height: 6 ft 6 in (1.98 m)
- Listed weight: 320 lb (145 kg)

Career information
- High school: Floral Park Memorial (Floral Park, New York)
- College: Stony Brook (2013–2017)
- NFL draft: 2018: undrafted

Career history
- Washington Redskins (2018–2019); Atlanta Falcons (2020); Cleveland Browns (2020)*; Washington Football Team (2020)*; Miami Dolphins (2021)*; Minnesota Vikings (2021–2022)*
- * Offseason or practice squad member only

Awards and highlights
- 3× First-team All-CAA (2015–2017); FCS All-American (2017)

Career NFL statistics
- Games played: 4
- Games started: 0
- Stats at Pro Football Reference

Timon Parris (born September 1, 1995) is an American former professional football player who was an offensive tackle in the National Football League (NFL). He played college football for the Stony Brook Seawolves and was signed as an undrafted free agent by the Washington Redskins in 2018.

== Early life ==
Parris was born in Elmont, New York, and grew up in Floral Park, New York. He attended Floral Park Memorial High School, where he was a member of the basketball, football and track & field teams. He played both offensive and defensive line for the Knights and was named All-Nassau County as a senior.

== College career ==
Parris joined the Stony Brook Seawolves football team as a walk-on and eventually earned a scholarship. He redshirted his freshman season and became a starter at tackle for the Seawolves as a redshirt freshman. Overall, Parris started 41 games for Stony Brook and was named first-team All-CAA in each of his final three seasons and was an FCS All-American as a redshirt senior.

== Professional career ==
=== Washington Redskins ===
Parris signed with the Washington Redskins as an undrafted free agent on April 28, 2018. He was cut by the Redskins at the end of training camp and subsequently re-signed to the team's practice squad on September 2, 2018. Parris was promoted to the Redskins' active roster on December 21, 2018, after Austin Howard was placed on injured reserve. Parris made his NFL debut on December 22, 2018, in a 25–16 loss to the Tennessee Titans.

Parris was waived on August 31, 2019, but was signed to the practice squad the following day. He was promoted to the active roster on December 14, 2019, after the Indianapolis Colts attempted to sign him off the Redskins practice squad. Parris played in three games on special teams in 2019. Parris was waived by Washington on September 5, 2020.

=== Atlanta Falcons ===
Paris was claimed off waivers by the Atlanta Falcons on September 6, 2020, before being waived on September 15, 2020.

=== Cleveland Browns ===
Parris was signed to the Cleveland Browns' practice squad on October 13, 2020, but was released on November 9, 2020.

=== Washington Football Team ===
Parris rejoined the Washington Football Team's practice squad on December 1, 2020. His practice squad contract with the team expired after the season on January 18, 2021.

=== Miami Dolphins ===
On May 20, 2021, Parris signed with the Miami Dolphins. He was waived on June 14, 2021, and re-signed with the team on July 19, 2021. He was waived on August 17, 2021.

=== Minnesota Vikings ===
On October 26, 2021, Parris signed to the Minnesota Vikings practice squad. He was placed on the reserve/COVID-19 list on November 8 and activated on November 16. He signed a reserve/future contract with the Vikings on January 10, 2022. He was waived on August 29.
