= Chris Cooper (safety) =

American gridiron football player (born 1994)

No. 39
- Position: Safety

Personal information
- Born: March 17, 1994 (age 32); Mount Vernon, New York, U.S.
- Listed height: 5 ft 10 in (1.78 m)
- Listed weight: 200 lb (91 kg)

Career information
- High school: Iona Prep (New Rochelle)
- College: Stony Brook
- NFL draft: 2018: undrafted

Career history
- Indianapolis Colts (2018); Cincinnati Bengals (2018)*; Kansas City Chiefs (2018)*; Atlanta Falcons (2019); Denver Broncos (2020)*; Tampa Bay Buccaneers (2021); St. Louis BattleHawks (2023); BC Lions (2024)*
- * Offseason or practice squad member only

Awards and highlights
- Second-team All-CAA (2017)
- Stats at Pro Football Reference
- Stats at CFL.ca

Chris Cooper (born March 17, 1994) is an American former professional football defensive back. He played college football at Stony Brook.

== Early life ==
Cooper was born in Mount Vernon, New York. After his freshman year of high school, he transferred from Mount Vernon High School, known more as a basketball powerhouse, to Iona Prep in order to focus more on developing his football skills. In his senior season at Iona Prep, he was named first-team all-state and first-team All-CHSAA (Catholic High School Athletic Association).

In the summer of 2013, after his senior year of high school, Cooper was badly injured while doing construction work after a large iron water pipe rolled off a shelf and struck him in the head, back and leg. He required eight staples and broke two bones in his leg. Cooper, who planned to attend Proctor Academy prep school in the fall to play football, instead had to undergo months of rehab. He took classes at Westchester Community College in the winter and played spring and fall football at ASA College in Brooklyn.

== College career ==
As a sophomore, Cooper transferred to Stony Brook prior to the 2015 season, joining fellow Iona Prep classmate Synceir Malone. He played in nine games as a cornerback. He was moved to strong safety before his junior season, starting all 11 games and finishing fifth on the team with 52 tackles. Cooper began to generate NFL buzz in his senior season, starting as he recorded nine tackles against FBS South Florida and Heisman Trophy candidate Quinton Flowers in Stony Brook's season opener. He finished the season fourth on the team with 81 tackles as well as recording an interception. He was also named second-team All-Conference.

Cooper began to earn more attention when he earned an invite to participate in the Tropical Bowl and ran a 4.43-second 40-yard dash on Stony Brook's Pro Day, with 16 teams expressing interest in him. He also completed 17 reps on the bench press and had a 35-inch vertical.

== Professional career ==
=== Indianapolis Colts ===
Cooper received multiple calls during the sixth and seventh rounds of the 2018 NFL draft, but was ultimately undrafted. After the draft, he was offered free agent contracts by the Seattle Seahawks, Washington Redskins and Indianapolis Colts. Cooper ultimately signed with the Colts because he believed his chances of making the 53-man roster were highest there. He recorded three tackles in preseason before suffering a concussion in the final game. He was placed on injured reserve and released in September.

=== Cincinnati Bengals ===
Cooper signed to the Bengals' practice squad on December 18, 2018. His practice squad contract expired on January 7, 2019.

=== Kansas City Chiefs ===
On January 8, 2019, Cooper signed to the Chiefs' practice squad for the postseason.

=== Atlanta Falcons ===
On April 12, 2019, Cooper signed a two-year, $1.08 million contract with the Falcons. In the preseason, he recorded 14 tackles. He was waived on August 31 but signed to the team's practice squad. Cooper was promoted to the active 53-man roster for the Falcons' season finale against the Tampa Bay Buccaneers. Cooper was placed on the reserve/COVID-19 list on August 9, 2020 and activated on August 11. The Falcons released Cooper during final roster cuts on September 5.

=== Denver Broncos ===
Cooper signed to the Broncos' practice squad on October 13, 2020. In January, he re-signed with the Broncos on a reserve/futures contract but was released on June 8, 2021 after the Broncos signed Peter Kalambayi.

=== Tampa Bay Buccaneers ===
Cooper signed with the Buccaneers on July 25, 2021. He made the final 53-man roster after impressing in preseason on special teams. He was waived on September 10, 2021 and signed to the practice squad three days later. He was released on December 28. He signed a reserve/future contract with the Buccaneers on February 3, 2022.

On August 30, 2022, Cooper was waived by the Buccaneers.

=== St. Louis BattleHawks ===
The St. Louis BattleHawks selected Cooper in the seventh round of the 2023 XFL Supplemental Draft on January 1, 2023. He was not part of the roster after the 2024 UFL dispersal draft on January 15, 2024.

=== BC Lions ===
On January 19, 2024, Cooper signed with the BC Lions. He was released on June 2, 2024.
