= Billy Cosh =

American football player and coach (born 1992)

Current position
- Title: Head coach
- Team: Stony Brook
- Conference: CAA
- Record: 19–13

Biographical details
- Born: March 5, 1992 (age 34); Minneapolis, Minnesota, U.S.

Playing career
- 2010: Kansas State
- 2011: James Madison
- 2012: Butler (KS)
- 2013–2014: Houston
- Position: Quarterback

Coaching career (HC unless noted)
- 2015: Concord (QB)
- 2016–2017: Indiana (GA)
- 2018–2019: VMI (WR)
- 2020–2021: VMI (OC/QB)
- 2022: Richmond (OC/QB)
- 2023: Western Michigan (OC/QB)
- 2024–present: Stony Brook

Head coaching record
- Overall: 19–13

Accomplishments and honors

Awards
- CAA Coach of the Year (2024)

William C. Cosh (born March 5, 1992) is an American college football coach. He is currently the head football coach for Stony Brook University.

== Early life ==
Cosh was born in Minnesota. At the time, his father Chris Cosh was the defensive line coach for the University of Minnesota football team. The Cosh family moved constantly as Chris changed coaching jobs often. By the time Billy was in high school, they settled in Maryland as Chris was the defensive coordinator for the Maryland Terrapins from 2006 to 2008.

== Playing career ==
Cosh attended Arundel High School from 2006 to 2009. He became the starting quarterback in his junior year, where he broke seven state records throughout the season including most passing yards (3,909) and most touchdown passes (56) in a season. In his senior year, he threw for 3,913 yards and 56 touchdowns, setting state records for career attempts (909), completions (594), passing yards (7,433) and touchdowns (112).

Cosh first committed to Kansas State, where his father Chris was the defensive coordinator. He redshirted his freshman season. He transferred to James Madison after the season, following a visit from their head coach Mickey Matthews which convinced him there was an opportunity for him there. However, he was at the bottom of the quarterback depth chart and did not play. Cosh would regret his first transfer as "a rash decision." In 2012, he transferred to Butler Community College but tore his ACL in the NJCAA junior college championship game, ending a season where he threw for 2,856 yards and 25 touchdowns.

He committed to Houston in December 2012. He was cleared to return in July 2013. In 2014, Cosh made his NCAA debut, completing five of nine passes for 32 yards in three games.

== Coaching career ==
Cosh became his coaching career at Concord. He served as a graduate assistant and quarterbacks coach for Indiana from 2016 to 2017. Then, he was hired at VMI, where he was the wide receivers coach before being promoted to offensive coordinator and quarterbacks coach, leading their "Pro Raid" offense. After four seasons, he was named Richmond's offensive coordinator. In his one season at Richmond, the Spiders had a top 20 offensive SP+ rating and advanced to the second round of the FCS playoffs. Cosh was hired by Western Michigan as their offensive coordinator before the 2023 season.

On December 13, 2023, Cosh was named the third head coach in Stony Brook Seawolves history. At 31 years old, Cosh became the second-youngest current Division I head football coach. He won his first game as a head coach on September 7, 2024, against Stonehill, a 37–10 victory for Stony Brook. It was the program's first win in 672 days. On October 26, 2024, Cosh's Seawolves defeated the 15th-ranked William and Mary Tribe 35–13, the program's first win against a ranked opponent since 2021. Cosh was named the 2024 AFCA Regional Coach of the Year. He also won Coastal Athletic Association (CAA) Coach of the Year. Stony Brook recorded its most wins since 2017, its first winning season since 2018 and its highest FCS national ranking since 2018.

== Personal life ==
Cosh is the son of football coach Chris Cosh, who served as defensive coordinator on multiple FBS college football teams. His older brother J.J. played college football for the Midshipmen of the United States Naval Academy from 2007 to 2011 and is currently a scout for the Chicago Bears.

Cosh met his wife Kelsey at the University of Houston. Their first child, a daughter, was born in 2023.

== Head coaching record ==
Year	Team	Overall	Conference	Standing	Bowl/playoffs	STATS^{#}
Stony Brook Seawolves (Coastal Athletic Association Football Conference) (2024–present)
2024	Stony Brook	8–4	5–3	T–6th		24
2025	Stony Brook	6–6	4–4	T–7th		
2026	Stony Brook	5–3	3–1			
Stony Brook:		19–13	12–8			
Total:		19–13				
