= Stony Brook Seawolves football =

Intercollegiate American football team for Stony Brook University

2026 Stony Brook Seawolves football team
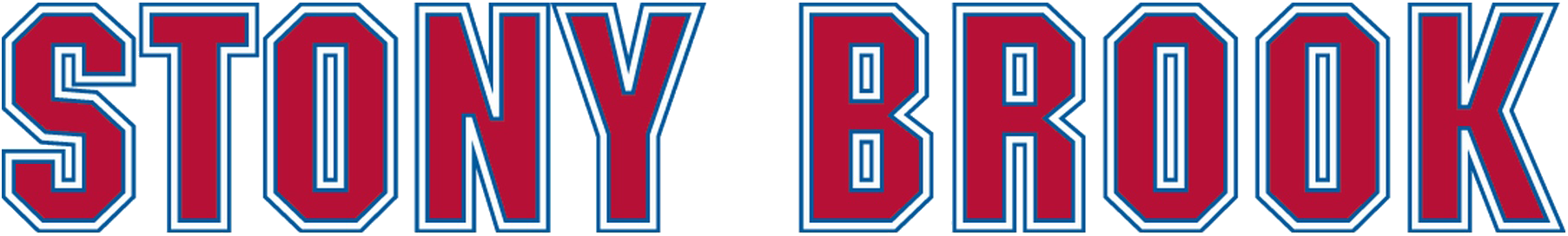
- First season: 1984; 42 years ago
- Athletic director: Shawn Heilbron
- Head coach: Billy Cosh; 2nd season, 14–10 (.583)
- Location: Stony Brook, New York
- Stadium: Kenneth P. LaValle Stadium (capacity: 12,300)
- NCAA division: Division I FCS
- Conference: CAA Football
- Colors: Red, blue, and gray
- All-time record: 214–221–2 (.492)

Conference championships
- NEC: 2005 Big South: 2009, 2010, 2011, 2012
- Rivalries: Albany (rivalry)

Uniforms
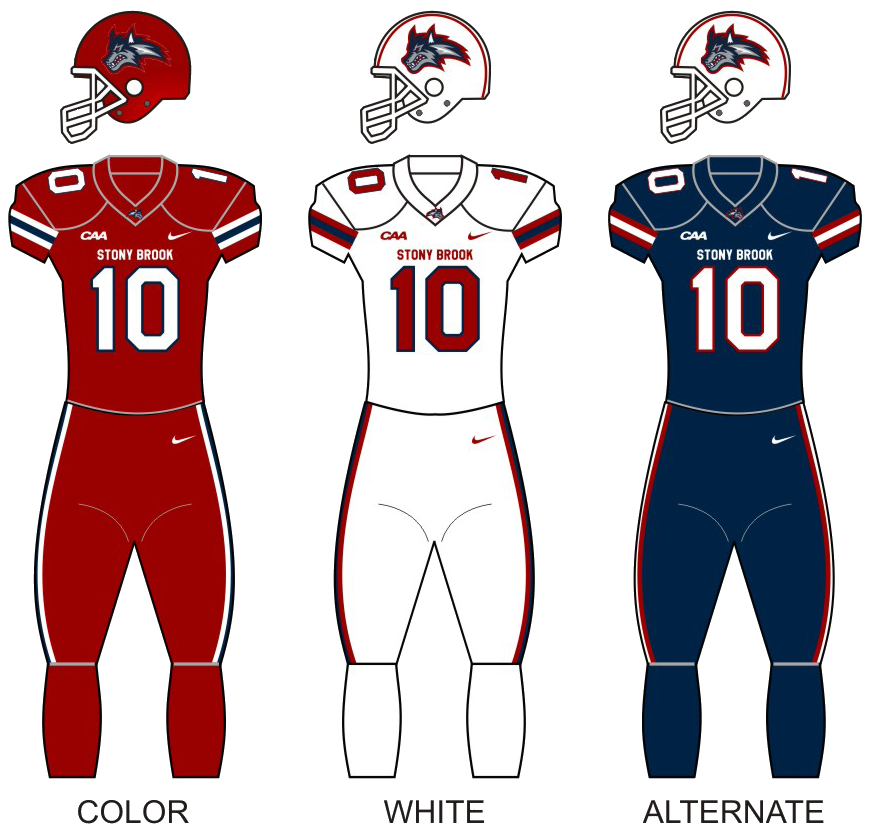
- Fight song: Fight Song, "Go, Fight, Win"
- Mascot: Wolfie the Seawolf
- Marching band: The Spirit of Stony Brook Marching Band
- Uniform outfitter: Nike
- Website: stonybrookathletics.com/football

The Stony Brook Seawolves football program represents Stony Brook University in college football at the NCAA Division I Football Championship Subdivision (FCS) level, competing in CAA Football. The Seawolves play at the 12,300-seat Kenneth P. LaValle Stadium in Stony Brook, New York.

Stony Brook first fielded a varsity team at the Division III level in 1984 and rose to Division II in 1996. In 1999, the Seawolves became a Division I program, joining the Northeast Conference without offering scholarships until 2006. After a year of FCS independence, Stony Brook joined the Big South Conference and fully transitioned into a 63-scholarship program. In the summer of 2012, the program announced its admission into CAA Football.

Since transitioning to Division I, the Seawolves have amassed five conference championships, including four straight from 2009 to 2012. They have participated in the Division I FCS playoffs four times and advanced to the second round three times. In 2012, they had their best performing season, winning a program-record ten games. After struggling in their first few CAA Football seasons, the Seawolves finished 10–3 in 2017 to finish in second place in the division, and returned to the playoffs in 2018.

In 2015, New York Giants tight end Will Tye became Stony Brook's first player to reach the NFL.

== History ==
Stony Brook first fielded varsity football in the 1983 season when its athletic teams were known as the Patriots. The football team transitioned into Division I in 1999 after leaving the Eastern Football Conference. In 2002, the 8,300 seat Kenneth P. LaValle Stadium opened as the new home of Seawolves football. The program joined the Northeast Conference in 1999 and participated as an associate member until 2006. It transitioned to a fully funded FCS program from 2006 until 2008 providing the maximum scholarship allowance of 63. In 2008 Stony Brook joined the Big South Conference. In the summer of 2012, the program announced its admission into the Colonial Athletic Association. In 2017, the stadium was expanded to add further 2,000 seats, which along with a standing capacity of at least 2,000, gives the stadium a total capacity of 12,300.

=== Early days (1984–1998) ===
After Stony Brook University's growth saw its enrollment rise to over 16,000 students, the athletic department started taking shape with the steady development of its collegiate programs. Football was one of them, and Stony Brook initiated competition against regional universities and fellow SUNY members schools. Stony Brook fielded varsity football for the first time in the 1983 season playing their first game against SUNY Maritime on September 18, 1983 but it was in 1984 when the team started playing a predominantly Division III schedule, and stats where first recorded by the NCAA. By 1985, Stony Brook did not schedule club teams for the first time.

In 1988, Stony Brook joined its first ever conference, the Liberty Football Conference in NCAA Division III, where it stayed until 1991. The Liberty Football Conference was a New York-only league where Stony Brook played again teams such as Hofstra, St. John's and Iona. Stony Brook left for the Freedom Football Conference in 1992, where it had winning seasons every year. When Stony Brook announced plans to transition to Division I in all sports, it joined Division II's Eastern Football Conference in 1997 for two years.

=== Starting Division I, joining and leaving NEC (1999–2007) ===
Stony Brook entered Division I football in 1999, participating in the Northeast Conference until 2006. Kenneth P. LaValle Stadium, then known as Seawolves Stadium, began construction in April 2000 and opened on September 14, 2002. Stony Brook beat St. John's 34–9 in the first game at LaValle Stadium, returning the opening kickoff for a touchdown. The Seawolves went 8–2 (5–2 NEC) in 2002 but struggled to replicate its success in following years. Head coach Sam Kornhauser announced before the season that 2005 would be his last at Stony Brook. On the final play of the year, Stony Brook won its first NEC co-championship with a 6–4 (5–2 NEC) season.

Stony Brook transitioned into a scholarship team with full funding beginning in 2006 and Chuck Priore was named the Seawolves' second head coach in program history. In Priore's first season, Stony Brook awarded the equivalent of 27 scholarships to 38 players and began broadcasting its games on 90.1 WUSB-FM, the campus radio station. Priore hosted a Sunday night talk show on WUSB-FM. Stony Brook played a harder schedule, facing Hofstra, No. 1 New Hampshire and No. 9 UMass. They lost their first four games of the season but won four straight in conference only to lose their title hopes to Central Connecticut.

Despite signing a contract to remain in the NEC through 2010, Stony Brook left to become an FCS independent in 2007 because it wanted to offer the FCS-maximum 63 scholarships instead of the NEC's limit of 30. The Seawolves were able to schedule No. 20 Richmond, No. 6 Youngstown State, No. 14 Hofstra and No. 24 Elon and finished 6–5.

=== Rise to FCS prominence in Big South (2008–2012) ===
Stony Brook joined the Big South in 2008, which offered 63 scholarships. After winning the season opener 42–26 against Colgate, the Seawolves lost their next five, including 33–0 to Liberty in the conference opener, but won four of their last five to finish their first Big South season 5–6 (3–2 Big South). The ESPN radio show Mike & Mike coined the name "The Battle for the Butter" for Stony Brook's game against Maine, which the Seawolves lost 28–13. In 2009, Stony Brook won its first share of the Big South title by winning five of six conference games, including upsetting Liberty 36–33 in the season finale.

In December 2009, cross-island rival Hofstra announced the immediate folding of its football program. Hofstra running back duo Miguel Maysonet and Brock Jackolski both transferred to Stony Brook in the offseason. The 2010 season saw Stony Brook schedule its first game against an FBS opponent, losing 59–14 to South Florida despite leading for the entire first quarter. While Stony Brook won its first five conference games by at least two scores, they lost 54–28 to Liberty in the season finale, settling for a share of its second straight share of the Big South title but not the automatic bid to the FCS Playoffs, which Coastal Carolina won by allowing the least points in conference play.

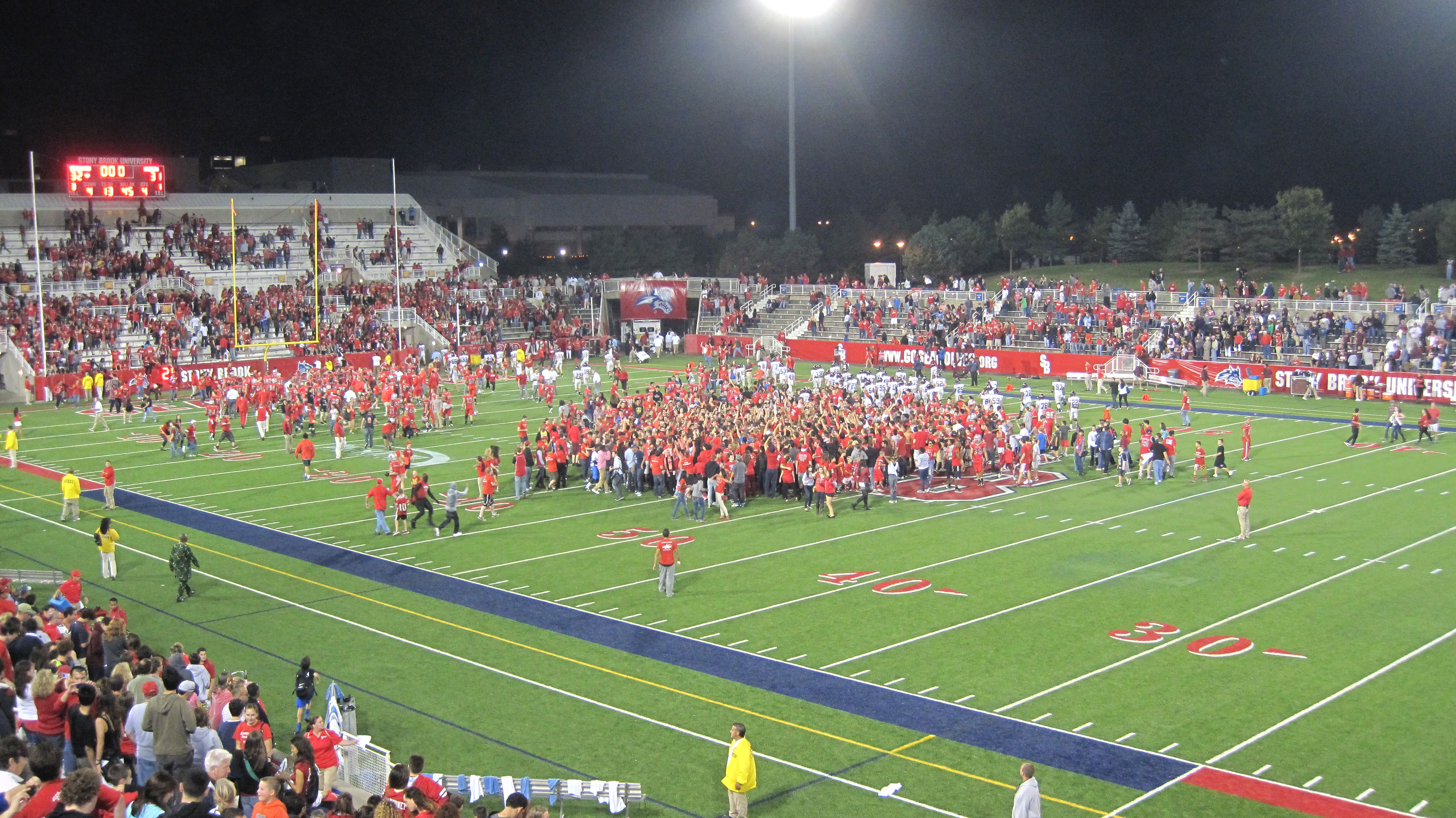
Stony Brook fans storm the field after beating Colgate 32–31 during Homecoming in 2012.

Stony Brook lost its first two games in 2011 to FBS teams, falling to UTEP 31–24 in overtime after allowing 21 unanswered points and being routed 35–7 by Buffalo. The Seawolves fell to 0–3 by losing to Brown 21–20 in the home opener. Then, Stony Brook began a program-record nine-game winning streak, beating Lafayette 37–20 in the conference opener and scoring at least 40 points in each game for the rest of the regular season. The Seawolves set the Big South single-game points record by crushing Gardner-Webb 76–28 and defeated Liberty 41–31 in the de facto Big South Championship Game to earn the conference's automatic bid to the FCS playoffs, Stony Brook's first. In the first round of the 2011 FCS Playoffs, Stony Brook paired up against in-state rivals Albany, coming back from an 18-point deficit to defeat the Great Danes 31–28 in front of a then-record-setting crowd of 8,286, capped off by a game-sealing interception from safety Dominick Reyes. In the second round, Stony Brook lost 34–27 to top-seeded Sam Houston State to end the season at 9–4 (6–0 Big South).

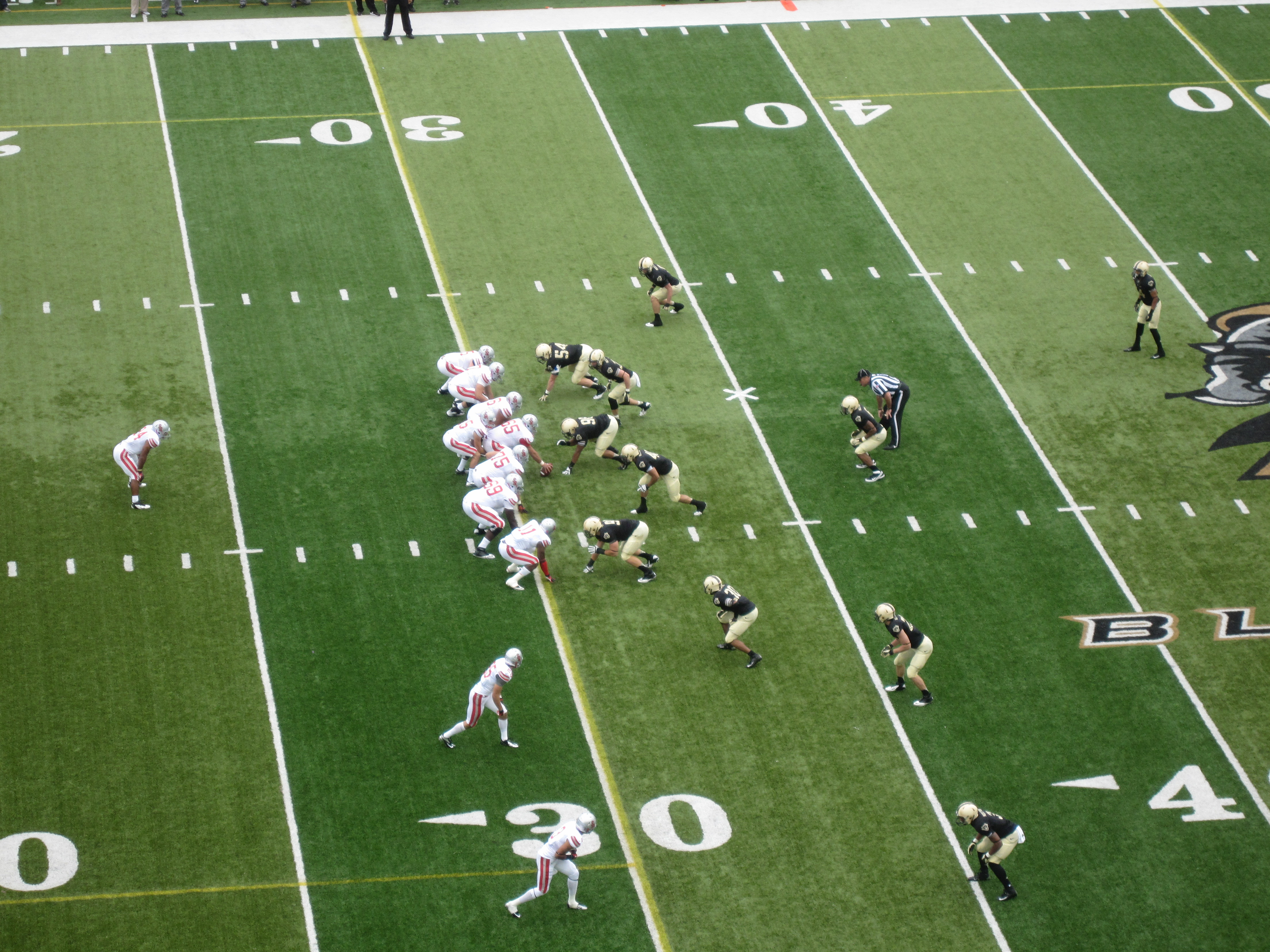
Stony Brook defeated Army 23–3 in 2012 for its first win against an FBS team.

Before the 2012 season, the Seawolves added several FBS transfers, including Iowa's Marcus Coker, Maryland's Adrian Coxson, and Minnesota's Leston Simpson. In addition, the Dubin Family Athletic Performance Center opened in the early summer. Stony Brook started 2–0 and then led for most of the first half against FBS Syracuse, but lost 28–17. The Seawolves broke their attendance record with 10,278 in a 32–31 comeback win over Colgate during Homecoming. Stony Brook made history in Week 5 by defeating Army 23–3. It was the program's first victory against an FBS opponent. The Seawolves opened Big South play on a high note and rode a seven-game winning streak to a No. 6 ranking in the FCS national polls, the highest in school history. Stony Brook lost the season finale 28–14 to Liberty, giving Coastal Carolina the autobid, but won a share of the Big South title for the fourth straight year. Stony Brook was granted an at-large bid to the FCS Playoffs for the team's second consecutive appearance.

The Seawolves beat Villanova 20–10 at home in the first round but lost 16–10 to third-seeded Montana State in the second round to end their season at 10–3 (5–1 Big South). The team's ten wins were the most in program history. Stony Brook graduated running back Miguel Maysonet, the Big South and the school's all-time leader in rushing yards (4,725) and rushing touchdowns (48). Maysonet ran for 1,964 yards and 23 touchdowns in 2012 but finished in second place behind Old Dominion quarterback Taylor Heinicke for the Walter Payton Award, given to the top FCS player in the country.

=== CAA Football era (2013–present) ===
In July 2012, rumors surfaced in the media of Stony Brook being a target for CAA Football. In early August, the CAA confirmed that Stony Brook, along with in-state rival Albany, would join CAA Football for the 2013 season.

==== Struggling to adjust (2013–2016) ====
Stony Brook scheduled matches against FBS Boston College and Buffalo for 2013, but Boston College pulled out. Stony Brook beat Rhode Island 24–0 in their first CAA game but lost their CAA home opener to No. 3 Towson. In the first edition of the Empire Clash against Albany with both teams in the CAA, Stony Brook won 24–3 in the season finale to end the season 5–6 (3–5 CAA).

The 2014 season began with losses to non-conference opponents Bryant and FBS UConn, and Stony Brook's record stood at 1–4 by the end of September. A three-game winning streak brought them back to .500, but they would lose three of their final four games, including the season finale at Albany, to end the season with a 5–7 record.

Stony Brook began their 2015 season with a match against FBS Toledo, but the game was suspended and canceled due to severe thunderstorms. While they won their first two games, including an upset against No. 13 New Hampshire, the Seawolves would go on to lose five in a row, all to conference opponents. Stony Brook won the final three games of the season but still ended with a record of 5–5 (3–3 CAA).

In 2016, Stony Brook won their season opener against No. 19 North Dakota before losing the next game to FBS Temple, who were led by head coach Matt Rhule. In Week 3, Stony Brook upset No. 2 ranked Richmond, pulling off a 42–14 victory at home. The surprise win helped the Seawolves earn a No. 20 ranking in the FCS STATS poll the next week, the team's first ranking since 2013. However, they were upset at home the next week by Sacred Heart, losing 38–10. Stony Brook would win their next three games to improve to 5–2 and an undefeated 4–0 in conference. Their season nosedived from there, as the Seawolves lost the final four games of the season to finish 5–6 (4–4 CAA). Stony Brook did not have a single winning season in any of their first four years in the CAA.

==== Back to the playoffs (2017–2018) ====
Before the 2017 season started, Stony Brook was predicted to finish 8th out of 12 in the CAA. While they lost the season opener at No. 19 FBS-ranked South Florida, Stony Brook ended the season with a 10–3 record, going 7–1 in CAA play to finish in second place behind James Madison. Their lone conference loss came at home against Delaware. In the regular season finale, Stony Brook won 20–19 at Maine on a Hail Mary which was caught in the end zone as time expired in the fourth quarter; the pass was ranked No. 1 on SportsCenter's Top 10 Plays. Stony Brook received an at-large bid to the FCS Playoffs, beating Lehigh 59–29 in the first round before losing to James Madison in the second round by a score of 26–7. The season was the Seawolves' most successful since 2012 as they won more than five games for the first time since joining the CAA. Stony Brook finished the regular season ranked No. 10 in the FCS STATS poll, the team's highest since a No. 6 ranking in 2012.

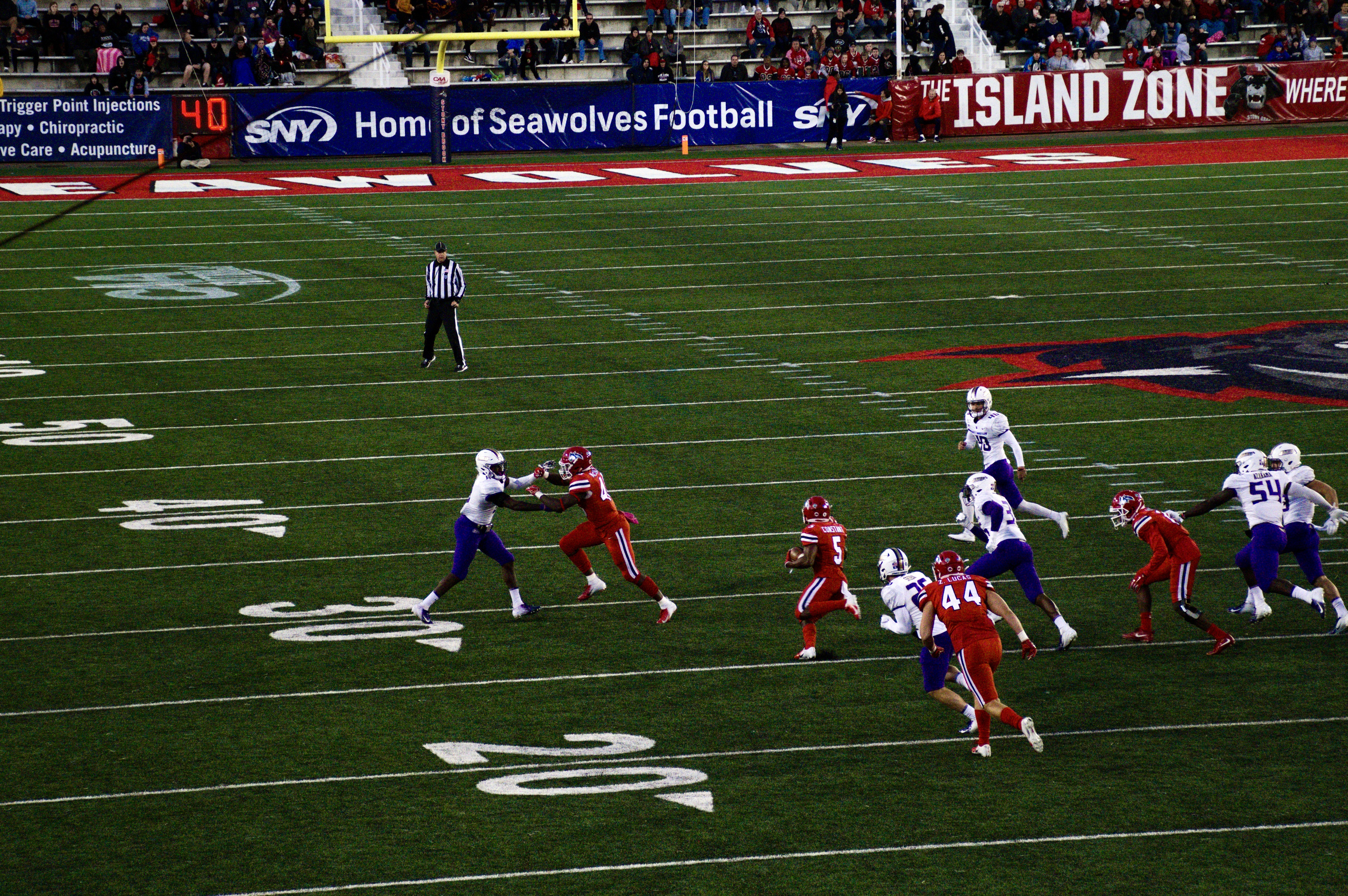
Stony Brook playing James Madison in 2019, the most attended game in program history.

Stony Brook began their 2018 season with a 38–0 road loss against FBS opponent Air Force. The team would rebound, winning their next four games including a 29–27 comeback victory against Villanova after trailing 21–0 in the second quarter. The team was upset on the road by Towson but beat New Hampshire 35–7 and Rhode Island 52–14. A major upset bid against No. 3 James Madison fell short 13–10, but Stony Brook came out of the bye week by toppling first-place Delaware 17–3. In the final game of the season, No. 10 Stony Brook was massively upset on the road, losing 25–23 to last-place Albany in a rivalry game that was decided on a last-second field goal. Regardless, Stony Brook still earned an at-large berth to the FCS Playoffs after finishing 7–4 (5–3 CAA), where they lost 28–14 to Southeast Missouri State in the first round.

==== End of Priore's tenure (2019–2023) ====
Stony Brook began 2019 with a 4–1 record, losing only to FBS Utah State and future first-round NFL quarterback Jordan Love. The team set a new attendance record with 12,812 during Homecoming in a 45–38 OT loss to No. 2 James Madison. The Seawolves upset No. 5 Villanova 36–35 but lost six of their last seven games of the season to end 5–7 (2–6 CAA). The 2020 season was played in spring 2021 due to the COVID-19 pandemic, where Stony Brook went 1–3 against all CAA teams and saw its final two games canceled because of opponents' outbreaks.

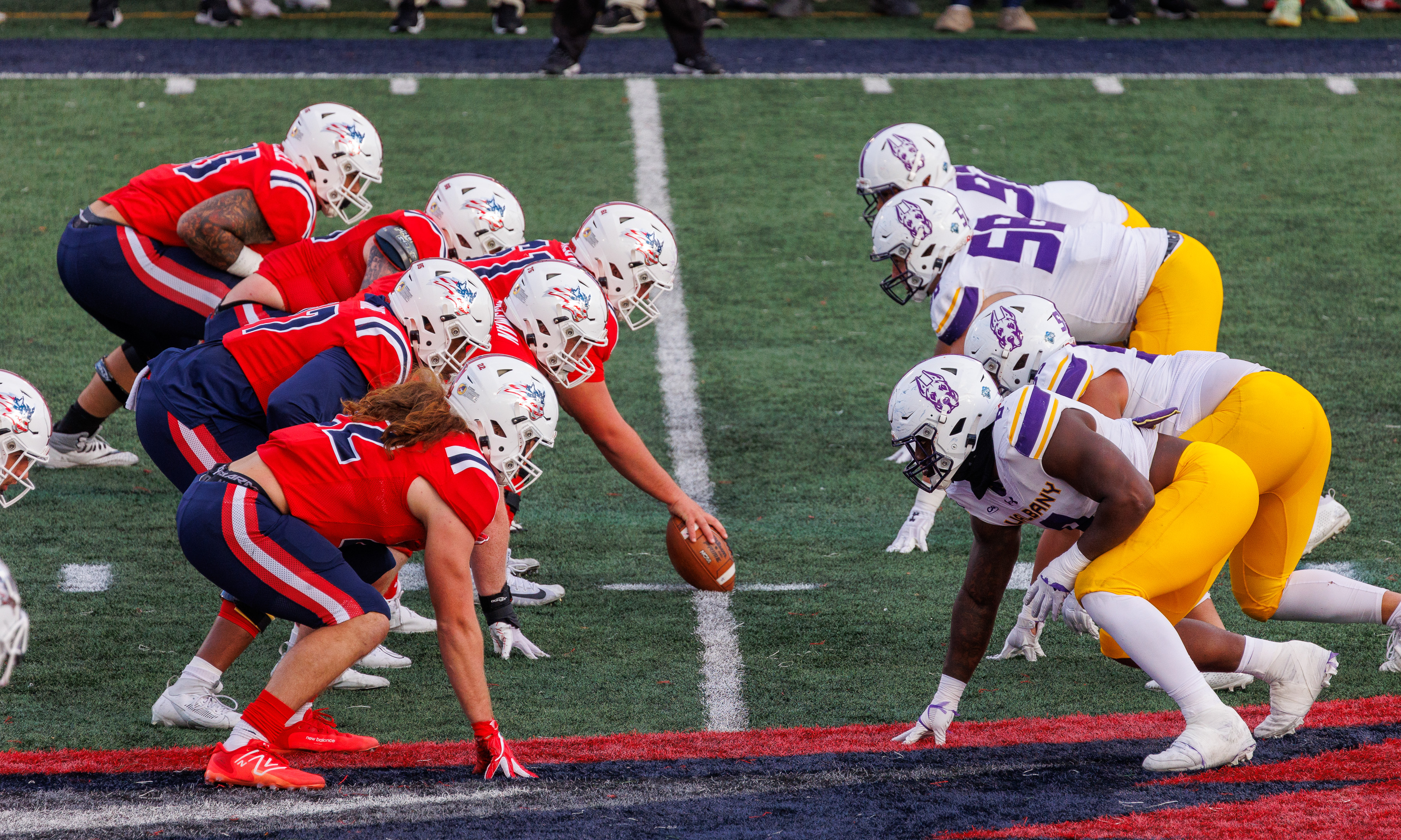
Priore's last game coaching the Seawolves was against the Albany Great Danes on November 11, 2023

In 2021, Stony Brook started 1–5 for the first time since 2008. In one of those losses, the Seawolves trailed by only 10 points at halftime against No. 4 FBS Oregon. Stony Brook won four of its last five games, including a 34–17 upset of No. 14 Delaware. However, Stony Brook still missed the playoffs for a third straight season with a 5–6 (4–4 CAA) record. In 2022, Stony Brook finished with a program-worst 2–9 record, but managed to outdo themselves in futility in 2023 by going 0–10 for the first winless season in program history. Priore was fired days after season's end, ending his 18-year tenure as Stony Brook's head coach with a 97–101 record and five straight losing seasons.

==== Billy Cosh era (2024–present) ====
On December 13, 2023, Billy Cosh was hired as the third head coach in program history.

== Conference affiliations ==
Stony Brook began play as a Division III program in 1984, transitioned to Division II in 1996, and finally ascended to Division I in 1999.

- Division III Independent (1984–1987)
- Liberty Football Conference (1988–1991)
- Freedom Football Conference (1992–1995)
- Division II Independent (1996)
- Eastern Football Conference (1997–1998)
- Northeast Conference (1999–2006)
- FCS Independent (2007)
- Big South Conference (2008–2012)
- CAA Football (2013–present)

== Championships ==
The Seawolves won their first Division I Conference Championship in the 2005 season while playing in the Northeast Conference with an end of the season record of 6–4 (5–2). In 2009, the Seawolves were named co-conference champions of the Big South Conference after finishing 6–5 (5–0) but did not earn a bid to the FCS Playoffs. In 2010, Stony Brook repeated as co-champions of the Big South after a 6–5 (5–1) season, but did not receive a bid to the FCS Playoffs after losing their season finale to the Liberty Flames 54–28. The Seawolves won their third consecutive Big South title, and first outright, in 2011, finishing with a 9–4 (6–0) record and earning their first trip to the FCS Playoffs after beating Liberty 41–31 in the Big South Championship. In 2012, the Seawolves won their fourth consecutive Big South championship, amassing a 10–3 (5–1) record.

=== Conference championships ===
Year	Coach	Conference	Overall Record	Conference Record
2005†	Sam Kornhauser	Northeast Conference	6–4	5–2
2009†	Chuck Priore	Big South Conference	6–5	5–1
2010†	Chuck Priore	Big South Conference	6–5	5–1
2011	Chuck Priore	Big South Conference	9–4	6–0
2012†	Chuck Priore	Big South Conference	10–3	5–1

† Co-champions

== Postseason ==
The Seawolves have appeared in the NCAA Division I Football Championship (FCS) playoffs four times. Their combined record is 3–4.

Year	Round	Opponent	Result
2011	First Round; Second Round	Albany; Sam Houston State	W 31–28; L 27–34
2012	First Round; Second Round	Villanova; Montana State	W 20–10; L 10–16
2017	First Round; Second Round	Lehigh; James Madison	W 59–29; L 7–26
2018	First Round	Southeast Missouri State	L 14–28

== Head coaches ==
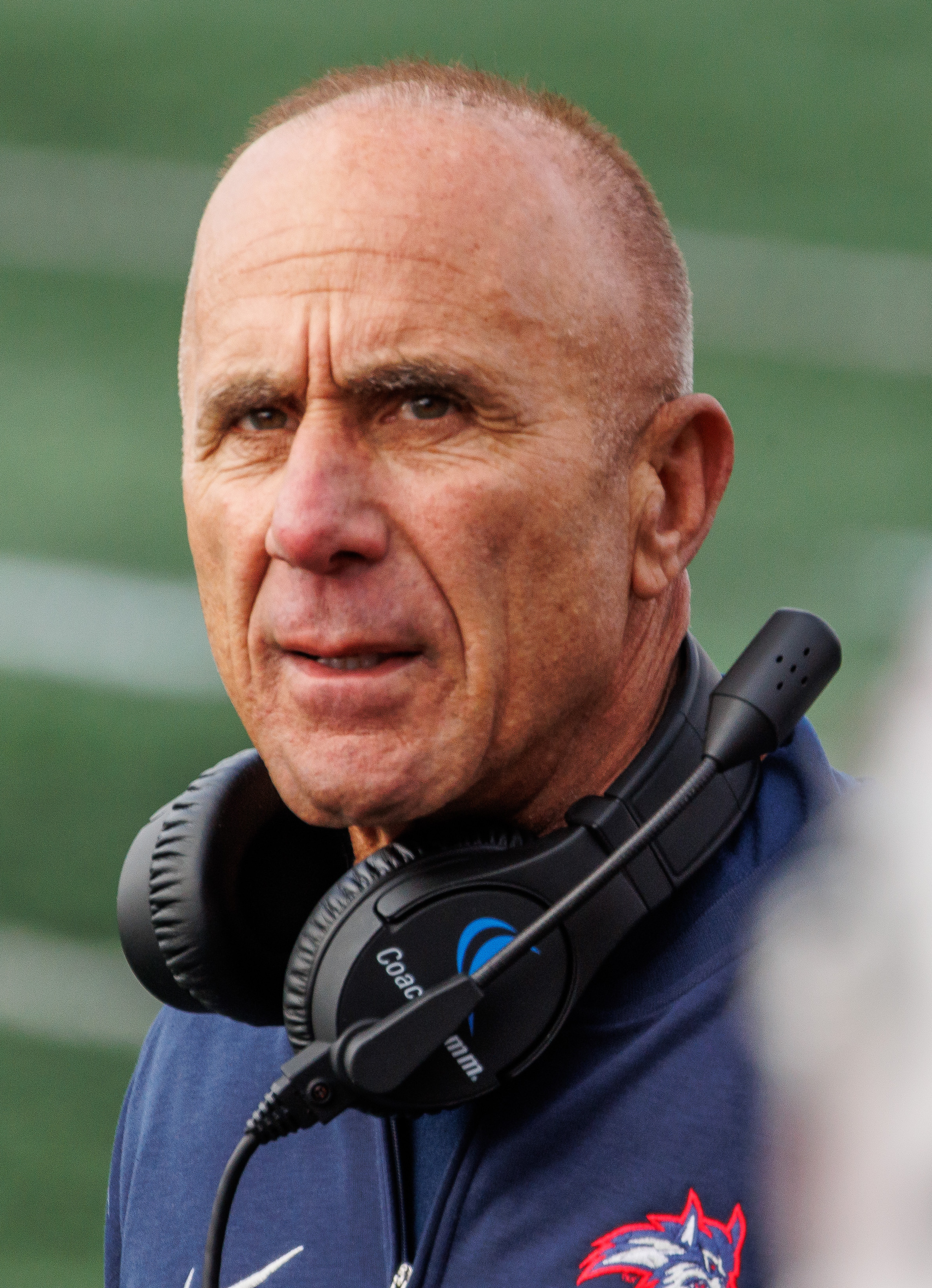
Chuck Priore, coach 2006–2023

Stony Brook has been led by the following head coaches.

Coach	Tenure	Record	Pct.
Sam Kornhauser	1984–2005	105–110	.488
Chuck Priore	2006–2023	97–101	.490
Billy Cosh	2024–present	14-10	.583

== Rivalries ==
- Albany

Albany, Stony Brook's in-state rival, first played the Seawolves in 1995 when both programs were at the Division II level. The two teams played each other annually from 1995 to 2007 before meeting again in the first round of the FCS Playoffs in 2011, where Stony Brook won 31–28. The rivalry was renewed beginning in 2013 after both Stony Brook and Albany joined the CAA; from then on, the rivalry was known as the Empire Clash. Beginning in 2015, the winner is awarded the Golden Apple trophy in the Battle for the Golden Apple. Each team alternates hosting the game each season, which is traditionally the last game of the CAA conference schedule for both teams.

== Facilities ==
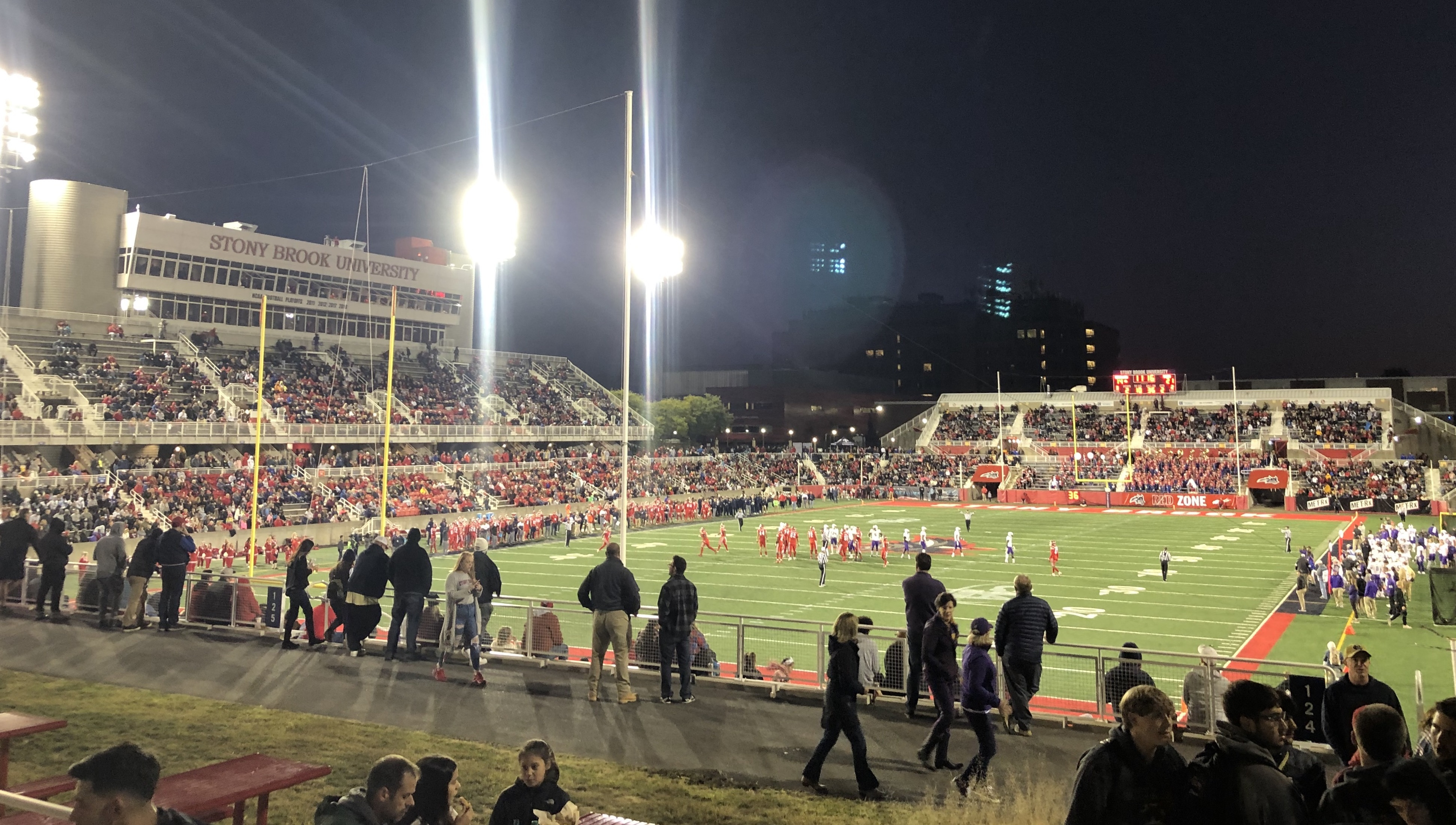
Kenneth P. LaValle Stadium during a sold-out Homecoming in 2019

=== Kenneth P. LaValle Stadium ===
Built in 2002, LaValle Stadium is the on-campus home of the Stony Brook Seawolves football team. LaValle Stadium has a seating capacity of 12,300. It was constructed with a cost of approximately $22 million and it is the largest outdoor facility in Suffolk County. It was named after the New York state senator who was instrumental in getting the funding for the stadium. The stadium is also shared with the school soccer and lacrosse teams. In October 2012, it was reported that the University has allocated $5.7 million for the addition of at least 2,000 seats to LaValle Stadium, which would bring the capacity up to 10,300. The expansion was completed in the summer of 2017. A further standing capacity of at least 2,000 gives the stadium a total capacity of 12,300.

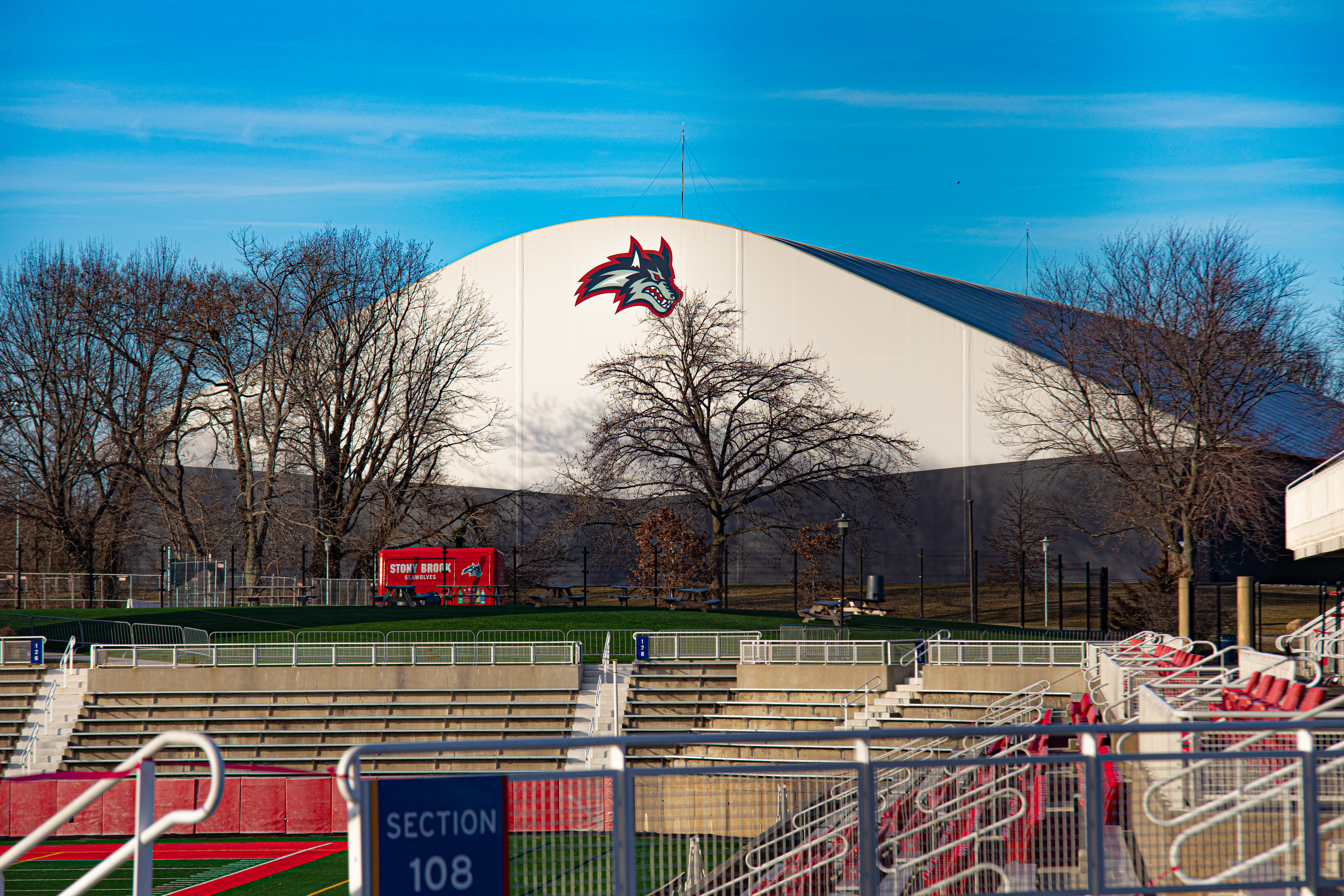
The Stony Brook Indoor Training Center

=== Dubin Family Athletic Performance Center ===
In February 2011 it was announced that a new strength and conditioning center will be erected in the north side of the Stony Brook indoor Sports Complex. It will be a 8,000-square-foot (740 m^{2}) facility set to be completed during the fall 2011. In Spring 2012, the facility was inaugurated. The facility provides the Seawolves with a world-class fitness facility and is named after alumnus Glenn Dubin, who donated over $4.3 million for the construction of the project, the largest athletic donation in the SUNY system. Dubin is an alumnus of Stony Brook who graduated in 1978.

=== Stony Brook Indoor Training Center ===
In 2020, the Stony Brook Indoor Training Center opened. It is a 106,000-square-foot facility that measures 180 feet wide, 315 feet long and 70 feet tall and is located 150 yards from Kenneth P. LaValle Stadium. The Dubin family announced a $5 million pledge for the funding of the structure.

== Notable alumni ==
NFL players

Name	Years	Round	Position	Teams
Will Tye	2015–2017	—	TE	New York Giants, New York Jets
Victor Ochi	2016	—	LB	New York Jets
Timon Parris	2018–2019	—	OT	Washington Redskins, Atlanta Falcons
Chris Cooper	2019, 2021	—	S	Atlanta Falcons, Tampa Bay Buccaneers
Sam Kamara	2021-2024	—	LB	Chicago Bears, Cleveland Browns
Gavin Heslop	2021	—	CB	Seattle Seahawks
Tyrone Wheatley, Jr.	2023-2024	-	OL	New England Patriots, Atlanta Falcons

Notable in other fields

- Dominick Reyes, DB, UFC fighter

== Program records ==
=== Career ===
Record	Amount	Player	Years
Passing yards	7,937	Timm Schroeder	1991–95
Passing touchdowns	68	Timm Schroeder	1991–95
Rushing yards	4,725	Miguel Maysonet	2010–12
Rushing touchdowns	48	Miguel Maysonet	2010–12
Receiving yards	2,404	Glenn Saenz	1992–96
Receiving touchdowns	28	Glenn Saenz	1992–96
Tackles	323	Aden Smith	1999–02
Sacks	32.5	Victor Ochi	2012–15
Interceptions	22	Paul Kylap	1985–88

=== Single season ===
Record	Amount	Player	Year
Passing yards	2,495	T.J. Moriarty	2004
Passing touchdowns	25	Timm Schroeder	1995
Rushing yards	1,964	Miguel Maysonet	2012
Rushing touchdowns	21	Miguel Maysonet	2012
Receiving yards	1,388	Kevin Norrell	2012
Receiving touchdowns	15	Kevin Norrell	2012
Tackles	140	Aden Smith	2002
Sacks	22.0	Joseph Lawrence	1994
Interceptions	8	Paul Emmanuel	1984

== History vs. FBS opponents ==
Year	Opponent	Result
2010	South Florida	L 14–59
2011	UTEP; Buffalo	L 24–31 ^{OT} L 7–35
2012	Syracuse; Army	L 17–28; W 23–3
2013	Buffalo	L 23–26 ^{5OT}
2014	UConn	L 17–19
2015	Toledo	Canceled
2016	Temple	L 0–38
2017	No. 19 (FBS) South Florida	L 17–31
2018	Air Force	L 0–38
2019	Utah State	L 7–62
2020	Florida Atlantic	Canceled
2020	Western Michigan	Canceled
2021	No. 4 (FBS) Oregon	L 7–48
2022	UMass	L 3–20
2023	Arkansas State	L 7–31
2024	Marshall	L 3–45
2025	San Diego State	L 0–42
2026	Ball State	

== Future non-conference opponents ==
Announced schedules as of March 31, 2026.

2026	2027	2028	2029
at Delaware State	at UMass	Delaware State	at Western Michigan
Lindenwood	at Northern Illinois	at Buffalo	
at Ball State			
at Fordham			
