= Albany–Stony Brook football rivalry =

American college football rivalry

Albany–Stony Brook Football Rivalry
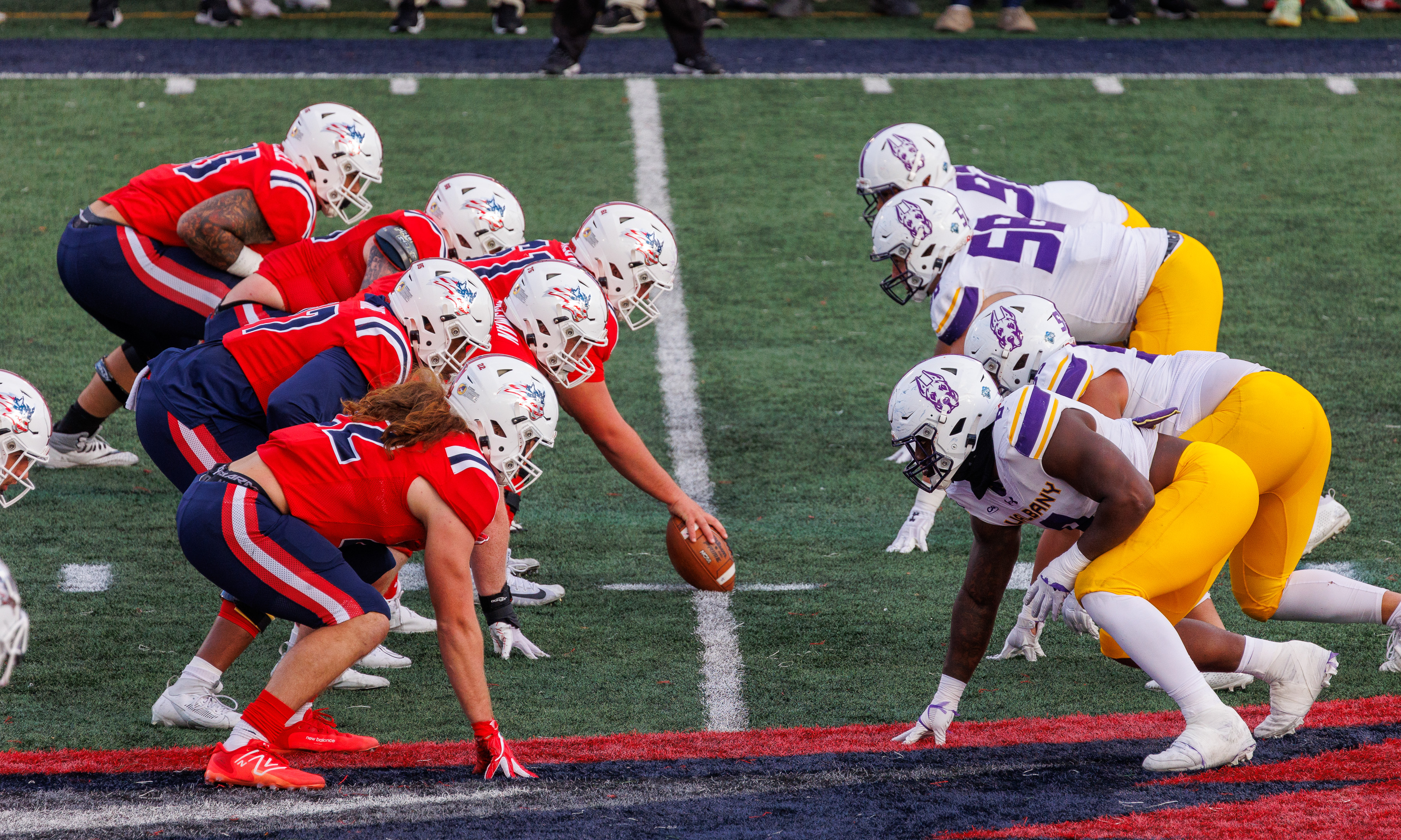
- The Great Danes beat the Seawolves, 38–20, in 2023

- Albany Great Danes Stony Brook Seawolves
- Sport: Football
- First meeting: November 18, 1995; Stony Brook, 40–21
- Latest meeting: October 17, 2026; Albany, 48–31
- Trophy: The Golden Apple Trophy

Statistics
- Total meetings: 28
- All-time series: Albany leads, 16–12
- Trophy series: Tie, 6–6
- Largest victory: Albany, 59–14 (2022)
- Longest win streak: Albany, 6 (1996–2001)
- Current win streak: Albany, 1 (2026–present)

Locations of Albany and Stony Brook

The Albany–Stony Brook football rivalry, also known as the Battle for the Golden Apple and the Empire Clash is an American college football rivalry between the Albany Great Danes and the Stony Brook Seawolves. Both teams represent university centers of the State University of New York, and since 2013 have competed together as members of CAA Football, the legally separate football league operated by the multi-sports Colonial Athletic Association (CAA). The two teams have met 28 times on the football field, with Albany currently holding a 16–12 edge in the all-time series. Albany leads the series 13–11 since 1999, when both programs moved up to Division I.

Since 2013, when both programs joined CAA Football together, they have been meeting yearly as part of their conference schedule. The rivalry game was coined the "Empire Clash" in 2013 during their first CAA Football game against each other. Starting in 2015, the winner of the game is awarded The Golden Apple Trophy. The game is traditionally played on the final week of the regular season.

Albany plays home games at Bob Ford Field at Tom & Mary Casey Stadium (capacity 8,500, grass surface, located in Albany, NY) and Stony Brook plays home games at Kenneth P. LaValle Stadium (capacity 12,300, artificial turf surface, located in Stony Brook, NY).

== History ==
The winner of each year's game is awarded the "Golden Apple" trophy. The trophy was first awarded in 2015, when Stony Brook defeated Albany 20–2 at Kenneth P. LaValle Stadium in the final week of the regular season.

Stony Brook and Albany began playing each other regularly beginning in 2013, when both schools joined CAA Football. This led to the origin of the "Empire Clash" nickname, as Stony Brook turned to its fanbase to help provide a moniker for the rivalry.

Both Stony Brook head coach Chuck Priore and Albany head coach Greg Gattuso admitted to feeling skeptical about the idea of the Golden Apple trophy when it was first introduced, but have since embraced the importance of its meaning to the teams and their fanbases.

The rivalry game is known to have implications on the FCS playoffs; in 2018, Albany defeated No. 10 Stony Brook 25–23 on a last-second field goal for its first conference win of the season, leading Stony Brook to settle for an at-large berth. In 2019, Albany defeated Stony Brook 31–26 to secure one of the last at-large berths in the playoffs.

=== Notable games ===
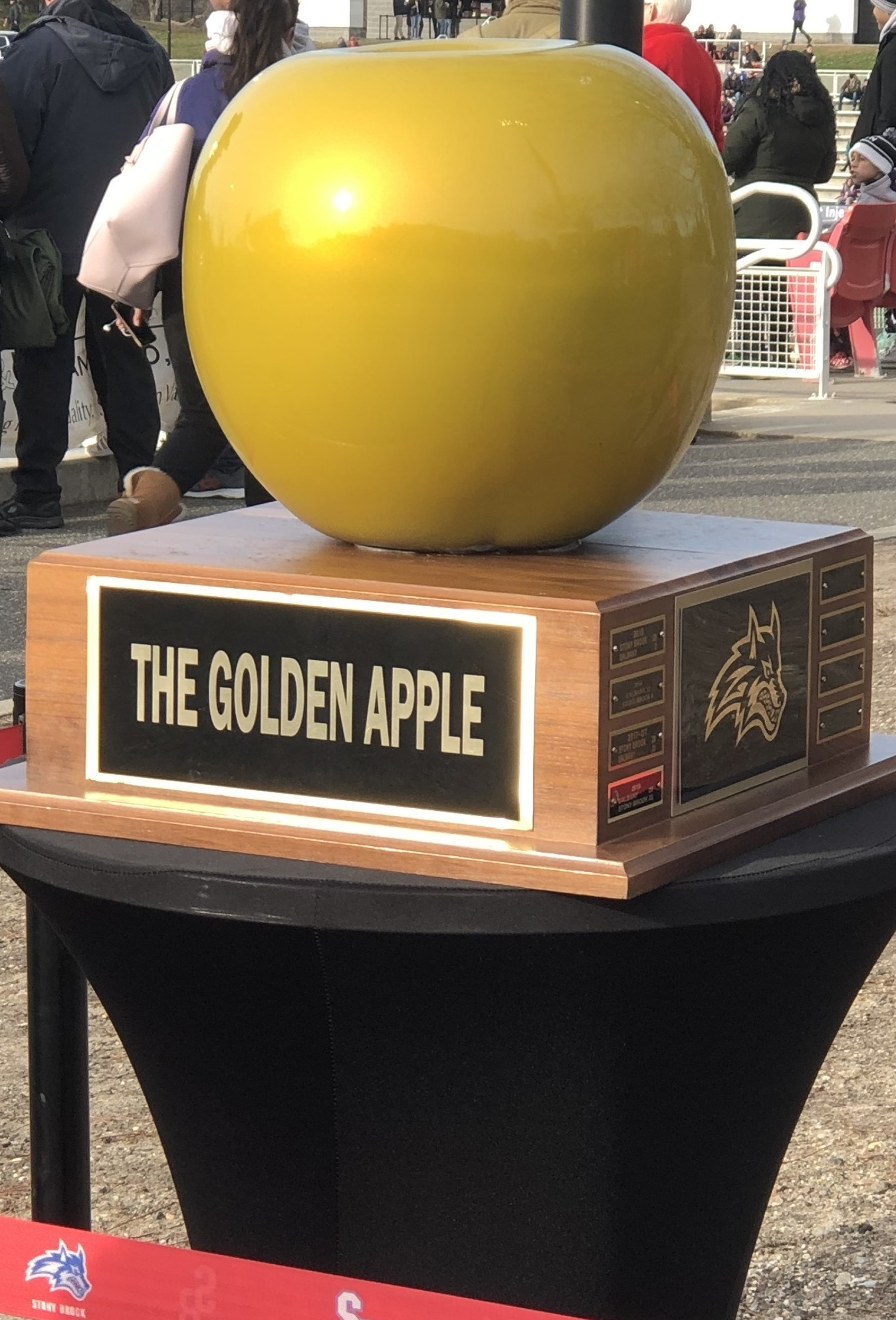
The Golden Apple trophy

In 2011, the two teams met in the first round of the FCS playoffs; it was both Stony Brook's and Albany's first playoff appearance. Albany led 28–10 in the third quarter before Stony Brook scored 21 unanswered points to take a 31–28 lead. Albany drove down to Stony Brook's three-yard line with less than a minute remaining in the fourth quarter before Stony Brook safety Dominick Reyes intercepted Albany quarterback Dan Di Lella in the end zone to secure the win for the Seawolves. The win was Stony Brook's first playoff victory. Stony Brook played in the Big South Conference and Albany played in the Northeast Conference at the time.

== Game results ==
Albany victories	Stony Brook victories

No.	Date	Location	Winner	Score
1	November 18, 1995^{A}	Albany, NY	Stony Brook	40–21
2	October 19, 1996^{A}	Stony Brook, NY	Albany	19–12
3	October 18, 1997^{A}	Albany, NY	Albany	30–23
4	October 17, 1998^{A}	Stony Brook, NY	Albany	42–16
5	October 2, 1999	Albany, NY	Albany	44–21
6	September 30, 2000	Stony Brook, NY	Albany	47–14
7	September 29, 2001	Albany, NY	Albany	28–18
8	September 28, 2002	Stony Brook, NY	Stony Brook	24–20
9	October 25, 2003	Albany, NY	Albany	40–7
10	October 23, 2004	Stony Brook, NY	Albany	27–22
11	October 8, 2005	Albany, NY	Stony Brook	7–3
12	October 7, 2006	Stony Brook, NY	Stony Brook	33–21
13	October 6, 2007	Albany, NY	Albany	24–23
14	November 26, 2011^{B}	Stony Brook, NY	Stony Brook	31–28
15	November 23, 2013	Stony Brook, NY	Stony Brook	24–3
16	November 22, 2014	Albany, NY	Albany	27–17
17	November 21, 2015	Stony Brook, NY	Stony Brook	20–2
18	November 19, 2016	Albany, NY	Albany	13–6
19	November 4, 2017	Stony Brook, NY	Stony Brook	28–21^{OT}
20	November 17, 2018	Albany, NY	Albany	25–23
21	November 23, 2019	Stony Brook, NY	Albany	31–26
22	March 27, 2021	Albany, NY	Stony Brook	21–7
23	November 20, 2021	Stony Brook, NY	Stony Brook	36–14
24	October 29, 2022	Albany, NY	Albany	59–14
25	November 11, 2023	Stony Brook, NY	Albany	38–20
26	November 9, 2024	Stony Brook, NY	Stony Brook	24–6
27	October 4, 2025	Albany, NY	Stony Brook	47–12
28	October 17, 2026	Stony Brook, NY	Albany	48–31
Series: Albany leads 16–12
Note:^{A} pre-Division I Note:^{B} 2011 FCS 1st Round Playoff Game; Source:

== See also ==
- List of NCAA college football rivalry games
