= Kenneth P. LaValle Stadium =

Football stadium in Stony Brook, New York

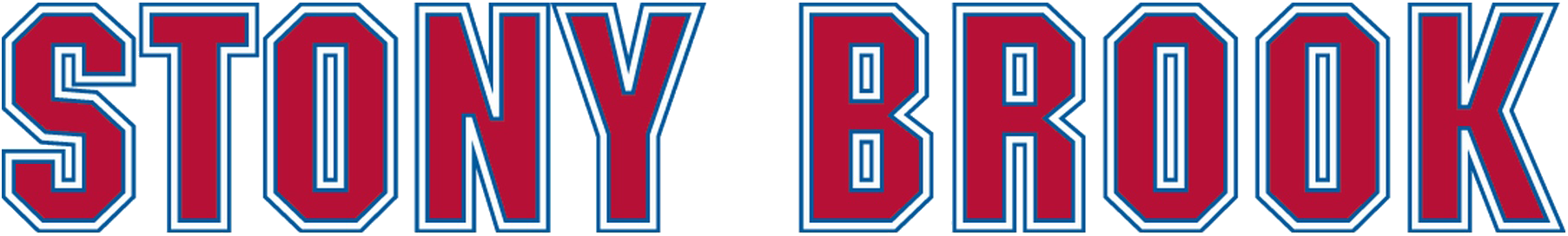

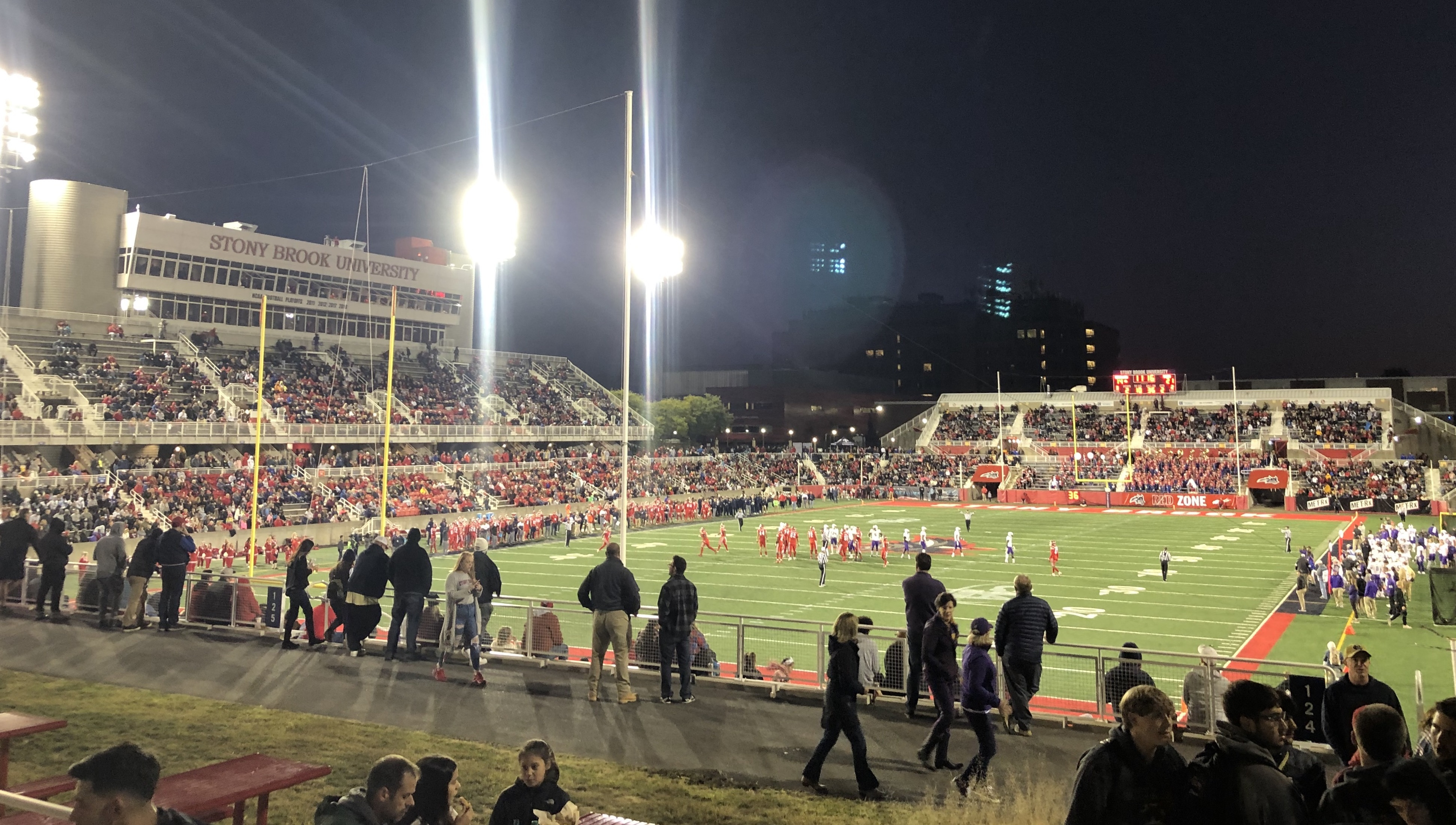
- The stadium during a football game in 2019
- Interactive map of Kenneth P. LaValle Stadium
- Former names: Seawolves Stadium (2002)
- Location: 100 Nicolls Road; Stony Brook, NY 11794
- Coordinates: 40°55′08″N 73°07′27″W
- Owner: Stony Brook University
- Operator: Stony Brook Athletics
- Capacity: 10,300 (2002–16); 12,300 (2017–present)
- Surface: FieldTurf
- Current use: Football; Soccer; Lacrosse

Construction
- Groundbreaking: October 25, 1999
- Opened: September 14, 2002
- Cost: $22 million ($39.4 million in 2025 dollars)
- Architect: Dattner Architects
- Structural engineer: Severud Associates
- Services engineers: Henderson Engineers, Inc.
- General contractor: The Tyree Organization

Tenants
- Stony Brook Seawolves (NCAA) teams: (2002–present); football; men's and women's soccer; men's and women's lacrosse

Website
- stonybrookathletics.com/stadium

The Kenneth P. LaValle Stadium is the main stadium for Stony Brook University in Stony Brook, New York, United States. Construction began in 2000 at a cost of approximately $22 million. With a capacity of 12,300 people (10,300 seating and 2,000 standing), it is the largest outdoor facility in Suffolk County. The stadium is home to the Division I Stony Brook Seawolves and their football, men's and women's soccer, men's and women's lacrosse teams.

The stadium opened on September 14, 2002. It was named in honor of New York state senator Kenneth LaValle on October 19, 2002. LaValle played a key role in the development and creation of the stadium. The stadium consists of a three-tier press box on the east side, as well as six luxury suites, a press box, television and radio booths, and a camera deck on the roof. Its most recent expansion came in 2017, with the addition of 2,000 seats in the north end zone and a new concessions and restrooms facility.

LaValle Stadium has hosted the 2006 and 2010 NCAA Division I Men's Lacrosse Championship quarterfinals, as well as the 2011, 2012 and 2018 NCAA Division I Women's Lacrosse Championship final fours and title games. The stadium also regularly hosts the Nassau and Suffolk County high school football championships.

LaValle Stadium was listed at No. 22 on a 2012 Yahoo! Sports list of "College Football's Top 25 Toughest Places to Play".

== History ==
As Stony Brook planned its transition to Division I from Division III, a new football stadium was immediately deemed necessary to replace Seawolves Field, a 1,000-seat bleacher stadium with muddy sinkholes that had existed since 1984. The first proposal in 1994 called for a $4 million multi-use stadium for football and lacrosse. However, 500 professors petitioned Governor Mario Cuomo to stop the stadium from being built along with Stony Brook's transition to Division I, because they worried a new stadium would add more traffic to the Three Villages, attract a rowdy crowd on weekends and take money from academic programs.

Construction on a new stadium began in 2000. Originally slated to cost $12 million, the final structure cost $22 million and was fully supported by Stony Brook president Shirley Strum Kenny, who said she was "serious about the athletic program, serious about Division I", and expected Stony Brook to became "important" and "a contender."

"Seawolves Stadium" opened on September 14, 2002, as the Stony Brook Seawolves football team faced the St. John's Red Storm in Stony Brook's first game as a Division I program. Stony Brook won 34–9, and the opening kickoff was returned for a touchdown by the Seawolves. At the time of its opening, the 8,136-seat stadium was the largest in Suffolk County, a record that is still held today.

On October 19, 2002, the date of Stony Brook's Homecoming game against Sacred Heart, the stadium was renamed the Kenneth P. LaValle Stadium in honor of New York state senator Kenneth P. LaValle, a key figure in the development and creation of the $22 million facility. Before its opening, the Stony Brook Director of Marketing and Promotions for Athletics had opened up the possibility of renaming the stadium for a corporate partnership or a former president of Stony Brook University.

Public criticism of the stadium's name occurred in 2009 after LaValle voted against the legalization of gay marriage in New York and in 2019 when LaValle voted against a ban on gay conversion therapy.

=== Expansions ===
In October 2012, Stony Brook University allocated $5.7 million for the addition of at least 2,000 seats to LaValle Stadium, bringing the seating capacity from 8,300 to 10,300, with a standing capacity of 2,000 bringing the stadium's total capacity to 12,300.

New York governor Andrew Cuomo vetoed a $22 million upgrade to the stadium in 2015, money which was originally allocated for a "computational biomedicine visualization and drug development magnet facility." The Senate had attempted to change the usage of the funds in the state budget as the intended programs no longer existed.

An expansion was completed in the summer of 2017 and added 2,000 seats in the north end zone, as well as a new concessions and restrooms facility. Before the 2018 season, a new turf field was installed in LaValle Stadium, also adding red end zones and a new midfield logo.

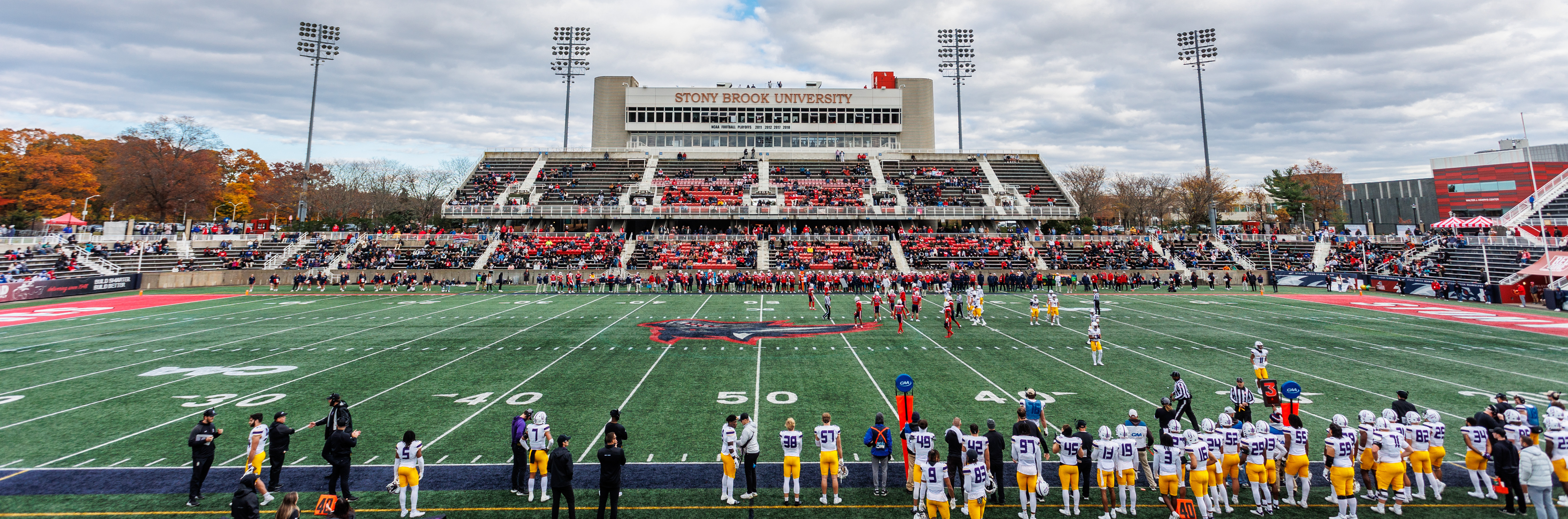
November 11, 2023: Golden Apple Trophy game against rival Albany Great Danes

== Events hosted ==
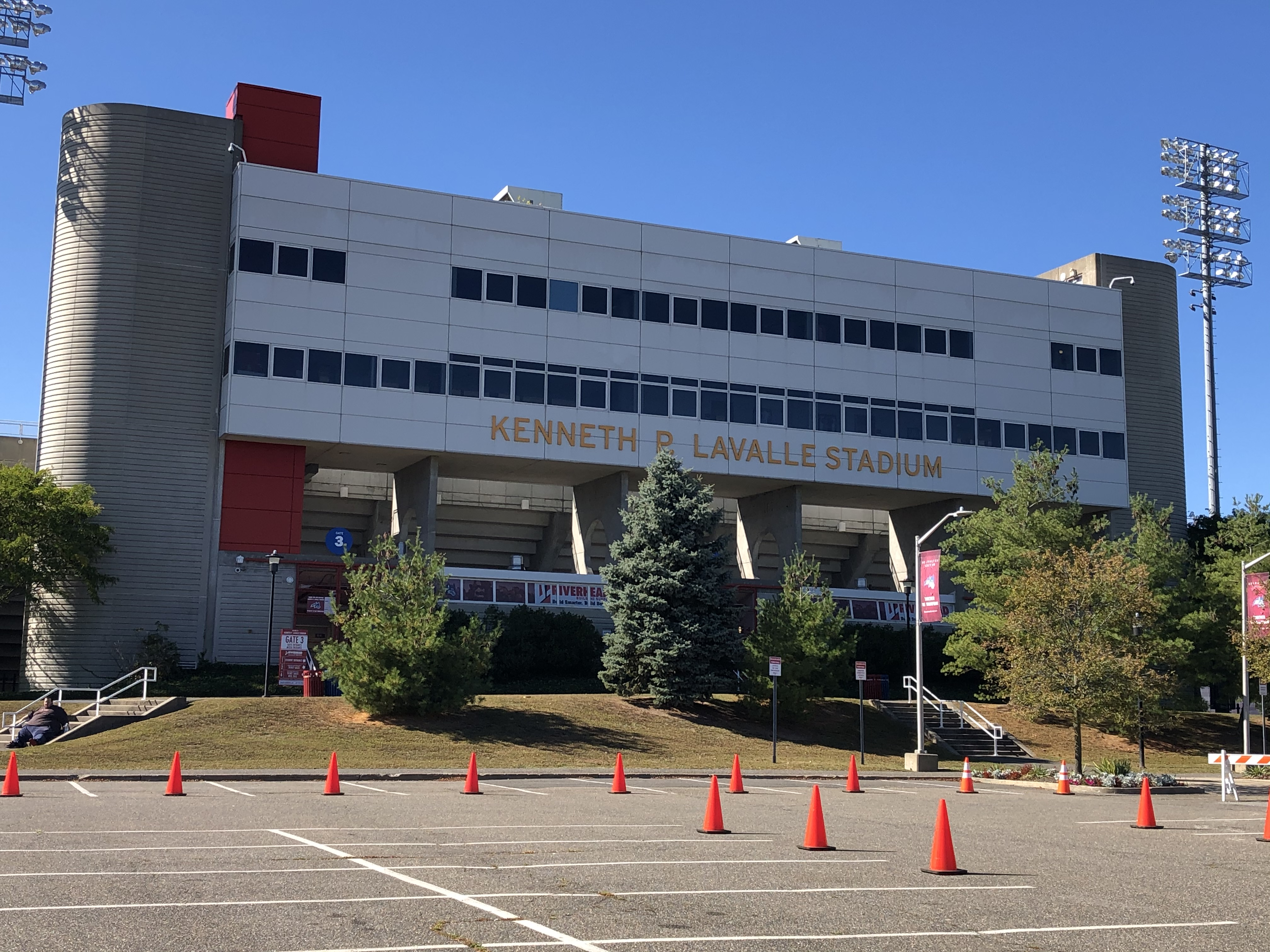
The front entrance of LaValle Stadium

In October 2005, LaValle Stadium was chosen to be the host site for the two North Region contests in the 2006 NCAA Men's Lacrosse Championship tournament, with both of the games aired on ESPN2. It was the first time that Stony Brook had hosted any NCAA postseason championship even since the program's move to Division I in 1999. A sold-out crowd of 8,335 attended the events. Stony Brook was again chosen to host the North Region games in the 2011 NCAA Men's Lacrosse Championship tournament quarterfinals.

A sold-out crowd of 10,024 watched the 2010 NCAA Division I Men's Lacrosse Championship quarterfinals at LaValle Stadium, where No. 8-seeded Stony Brook fell 10–9 to No. 1-seeded Virginia, falling one goal short of the Final Four.

LaValle Stadium first hosted the Final Four and championship game of the NCAA women's lacrosse tournament in 2011, after three consecutive seasons of being held at Towson University's Johnny Unitas Stadium. A crowd of 8,011 witnessed Northwestern beat Maryland in the title game. The event resulted in 20,000 people visiting the Stony Brook region and $100,000 in hotel revenue. Stony Brook was chosen to host the 2012 Final Four as well. The Final Four returned to Stony Brook in 2018.

LaValle Stadium was set to host three games of the 2020 Premier Lacrosse League (PLL) season, including a nationally televised game on NBC in June, but due to the COVID-19 pandemic, the league held its season in a bubble in Utah instead.

== Attendance records ==
The most attended game in Kenneth P. LaValle Stadium history occurred on October 5, 2019, when 12,812 showed up for a Homecoming game against James Madison in which Stony Brook lost, 45–38, in overtime.

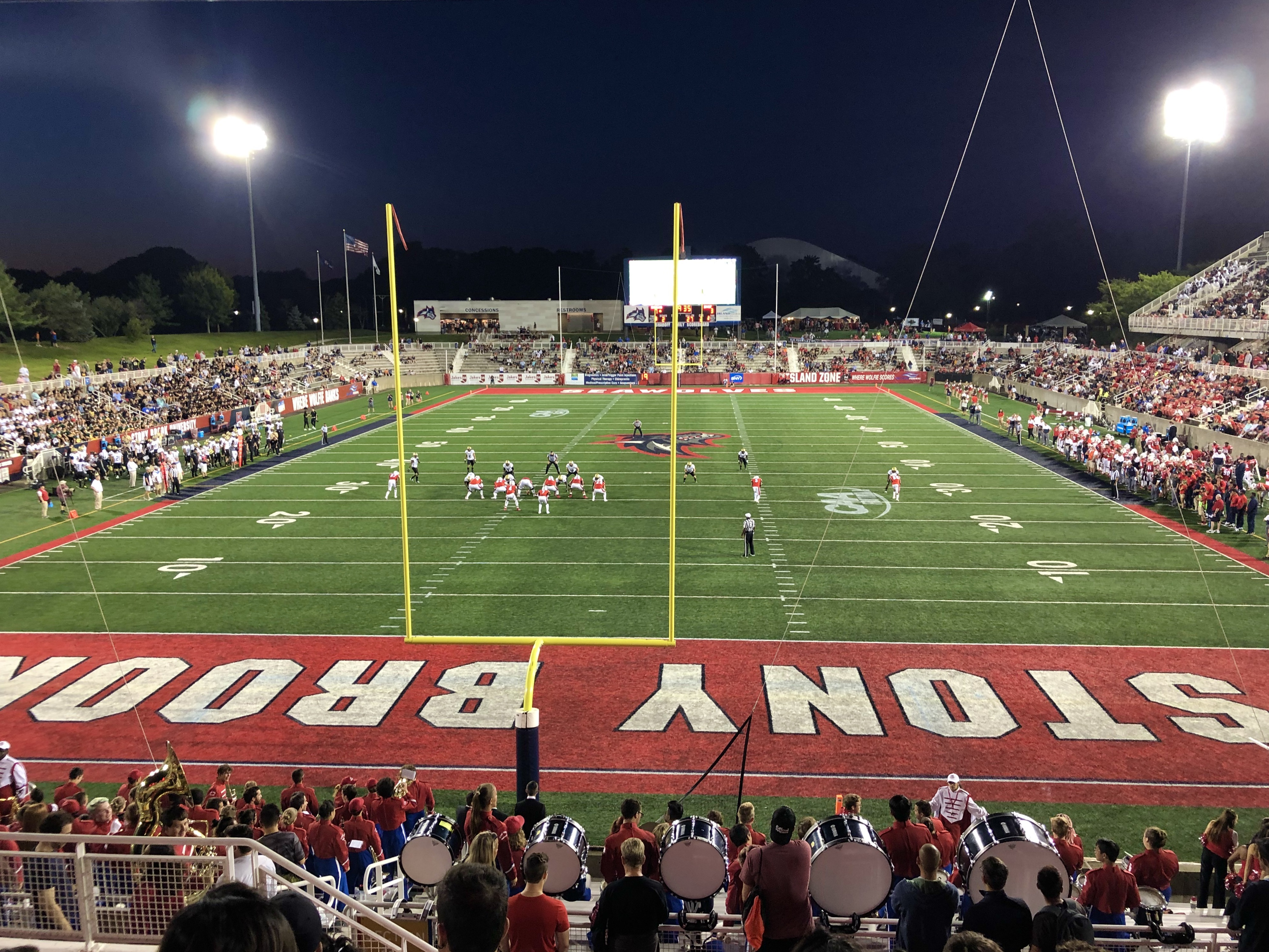
LaValle Stadium in 2019

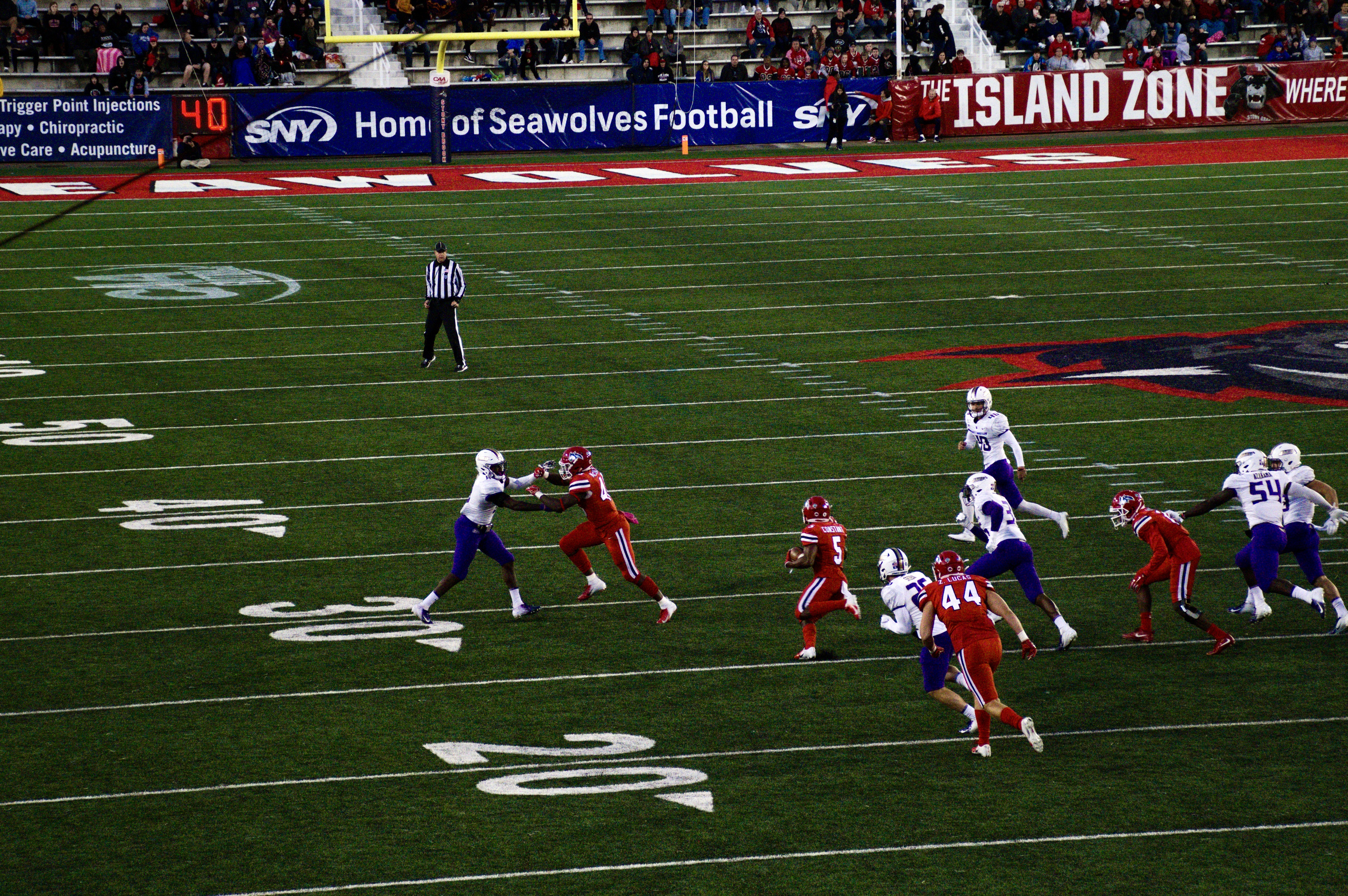
LaValle Stadium during its most-attended game

Highest attendance at Kenneth P. LaValle Stadium (football)
Rank	Attendance	Date	Game result
1	12,812	October 5, 2019*	24 Stony Brook 38, 2 James Madison 45 (OT)
2	12,701	October 20, 2018*	18 Stony Brook 52, Rhode Island 14
3	12,311	October 14, 2017*	Stony Brook 38, 12 New Hampshire 24
4	12,221	October 15, 2016*	Stony Brook 14, Rhode Island 3
5	12,177	October 17, 2015*	Stony Brook 14, Towson 21
6	11,301	September 27, 2014*	Stony Brook 21, William & Mary 27 (OT)
7	11,224	October 5, 2013*	Stony Brook 21, Bryant 13
8	11,132	August 31, 2023	Stony Brook 13, 22 Delaware 37
9	10,278	September 22, 2012*	Stony Brook 32, Colgate 31
10	10,252	August 28, 2014	Stony Brook 7, Bryant 13
11	10,250	October 23, 2021*	Stony Brook 27, Richmond 14
12	9,652	August 29, 2019	Stony Brook 35, Bryant 10
13	8,286	November 26, 2011	22 Stony Brook 31, Albany 28
14	8,278	September 24, 2011*	Stony Brook 37, Lafayette 20
15	8,132	September 14, 2002	Stony Brook 34, St. John's 9
16	8,102	September 16, 2017	Stony Brook 45, Sacred Heart 7
17	8,062	September 7, 2024	Stony Brook 37, Stonehill 10
18	7,896	November 19, 2011	Stony Brook 41, 16 Liberty 31
19	7,859	September 28, 2013	Stony Brook 21, 3 Towson 35
20	7,833	September 24, 2016	20 Stony Brook 10, Sacred Heart 38

Asterisks indicate Homecoming games.

== See also ==
- List of NCAA Division I FCS football stadiums
