= CAA women's soccer tournament =

American college women's soccer tournament

- Conference soccer championship
- Sport: College soccer
- Conference: Coastal Athletic Association
- Number of teams: 6
- Format: Single-elimination tournament
- Current stadium: Campus Sites (Higher Seed)
- Played: 1995–present
- Last contest: 2026
- Current champion: UNC Wilmington (2nd title)
- Most championships: Hofstra; William & Mary (8 titles each)
- TV partner: FloFC
- Official website: caasports.com/wsoc

The CAA women's soccer tournament is the conference championship tournament in soccer for the Coastal Athletic Association (CAA). The tournament has been held every year since 1995. It is a single-elimination tournament and seeding is based on regular season records. The winner, declared conference champion, receives the conference's automatic bid to the NCAA Division I women's soccer championship.

== Champions ==
Key

- (1) — Title number
- a.e.t. — Match went to extra time
- p – Match decided by a penalty shootout after extra time
- – Winning team also won regular season

=== By year ===
Ed.	Year	Champion	Score	Runner-up	Venue / city	MVP	Ref.
1	1995	James Madison (1)	2–0	William & Mary	Sentara Park • Harrisonburg, VA	Stacy Bilodeau, James Madison	
2	1996	William & Mary (1)	2–0	George Mason	UNCW Soccer Stadium • Wilmington, NC	Missy Wycinski, William & Mary	
3	1997	William & Mary (2)	1–0	George Mason	George Mason Stadium • Fairfax, VA	Anna Cook, William & Mary	
4	1998	William & Mary (3)	1–0	Richmond	Old Dominion Soccer Complex • Virginia Beach, VA	Whitney Paynter, William & Mary	
5	1999	William & Mary (4)	2–1	Richmond	Old Dominion Soccer Complex • Virginia Beach, VA	Missy Wycinski, William & Mary	
6	2000	William & Mary (5)	1–0 (a.e.t.)	George Mason	Old Dominion Soccer Complex • Virginia Beach, VA	Kim Newell, William & Mary	
7	2001	William & Mary (6)	2–1	James Madison	Old Dominion Soccer Complex • Virginia Beach, VA	Lindsey Vanderspiegel, William & Mary	
8	2002	James Madison (2)	2–0	George Mason	Old Dominion Soccer Complex • Virginia Beach, VA	Teri Joyce, James Madison	
9	2003	William & Mary (7)	2–0	VCU	Hofstra University Soccer Stadium • Hempstead, NY	Nikki Villott, William & Mary	
10	2004	VCU (1)	3–1	William & Mary	Sports Backers Stadium • Richmond, VA	Jennifer Woodie	
11	2005	Hofstra (1)	1–0	VCU	Sports Backers Stadium • Richmond, VA	Sue Weber, Hofstra	
12	2006	Old Dominion (1)	3–2 (a.e.t.)	James Madison	Old Dominion Soccer Complex • Virginia Beach, VA	Shavon Knight, Old Dominion	
13	2007	Hofstra (2)	1–0	VCU	Old Dominion Soccer Complex • Virginia Beach, VA	Sue Weber, Hofstra	
14	2008	Northeastern (1)	1–0 (a.e.t.)	Hofstra	Albert–Daly Field • Williamsburg, VA	Jenna Lucchesi, Northeastern	
15	2009	UNC Wilmington (1)	1–0	James Madison	Parsons Field • Brookline, MA	Erin Pardini, UNC Wilmington	
16	2010	James Madison (3)	2–0	Hofstra	Hofstra University Soccer Stadium • Hempstead, NY	Diane Wszalek, James Madison	
17	2011	William & Mary (8)	1–0 (a.e.t.)	VCU	Albert–Daly Field • Williamsburg, VA	Tara Connors, William & Mary	
18	2012	Hofstra (3)	2–1 (a.e.t.)	UNCW	Albert–Daly Field • Williamsburg, VA	Emily Morphitis, Hofstra	
19	2013	Northeastern (2)	3–1	James Madison	Sentara Park • Harrisonburg, VA	Hanna Terry, Northeastern	
20	2014	Northeastern (3)	2–0	Hofstra	Parsons Field • Brookline, MA	Mackenzie Dowd, Northeastern	
21	2015	James Madison (4)	3–2	William & Mary	Hofstra University Soccer Stadium • Hempstead, NY	Ashley Herndon, James Madison	
22	2016	Northeastern (4)	3–0	Drexel	Parsons Field • Brookline, MA	Hannah Rosenblatt, Northeastern	
23	2017	Hofstra (4)	2–1	Northeastern	Hofstra University Soccer Stadium • Hempstead, NY	Kristin Desmond, Hofstra	
24	2018	Hofstra (5)	1–0	James Madison	Sentara Park • Harrisonburg, VA	Madeline Anderson, Hofstra	
25	2019	Hofstra (6)	5–1	James Madison	Hofstra University Soccer Stadium • Hempstead, NY	Lucy Porter, Hofstra	
26	2020	Elon (1)	1–0	UNCW	Tiger Field • Towson, MD	Carson Jones, Elon	
27	2021	Hofstra (7)	2–1	Northeastern	Rudd Field • Elon, NC	Lucy Porter, Hofstra	
28	2022	Hofstra (8)	2–1 (a.e.t.)	Northeastern	Parsons Field • Brookline, MA	Anja Suttner, Hofstra	
29	2023	Towson (1)	2–1	Monmouth	Tiger Field • Towson, MD	Riley Melendez, Towson	
30	2024	Stony Brook (1)	2–1	Monmouth	Hesse Field • West Long Branch, NJ	Linn Beck, Stony Brook	
31	2025	Elon (2)	1–1 (6–5 p)	Stony Brook	Kenneth P. LaValle Stadium • Stony Brook, NY	Katie Bisgrove, Elon	
32	2026	UNCW (2)	3–1	Towson	UNCW Soccer Stadium • Wilmington, NC	Allie Planeaux, UNCW	

=== By school ===
As of 2026 Tournament

School	W	L	T	Pct.	Finals	Titles	Winning years
American	1	4	0	.200	0	0	—
Campbell	0	0	0	–	0	0	—
Charleston	1	4	0	.200	0	0	—
Delaware	1	8	3	.208	0	0	—
Drexel	2	5	1	.313	1	0	—
East Carolina	0	4	1	.100	0	0	—
Elon	5	4	2	.545	2	2	2020, 2025
Georgia State	0	1	0	.000	0	0	—
Hampton	0	0	0	–	0	0	—
Hofstra	22	15	4	.585	11	8	2005, 2007, 2012, 2017, 2018, 2019, 2021, 2022
George Mason	10	10	3	.500	4	0	—
James Madison	25	20	1	.554	10	4	1995, 2002, 2010, 2015
Monmouth	3	3	1	.500	2	0	—
Northeastern	13	10	5	.554	7	4	2008, 2013, 2014, 2016
Old Dominion	5	8	3	.406	1	1	2006
Richmond	4	4	0	.500	2	0	—
Stony Brook	5	3	1	.611	3	2	2024
Towson	4	3	0	.571	2	1	2023
VCU	7	13	3	.370	5	1	2004
William & Mary	29	12	7	.677	11	8	1996, 1997, 1998, 1999, 2000, 2001, 2003, 2011
UNC Wilmington	9	16	5	.383	4	2	2009, 2026

Teams in italics no longer sponsor women's soccer in the CAA.
