= 2016 Colonial Athletic Association women's soccer season =

Colonial Athletic Association
- Season: 2016

2016 Colonial Athletic Association women's soccer standings
	Conf.						Overall
Team	W		L		T	PCT	W		L		T	PCT
Northeastern ‍†‍‡‍^{y}	7	–	2	–	0	.778	14	–	7	–	1	.659
Drexel ‍‍‍	4	–	2	–	3	.611	9	–	7	–	4	.550
James Madison ‍‍‍	5	–	4	–	0	.556	9	–	11	–	0	.450
UNC Wilmington ‍‍‍	4	–	3	–	2	.556	10	–	5	–	4	.632
William & Mary ‍‍‍	4	–	4	–	1	.500	10	–	8	–	2	.550
Charleston ‍‍‍	3	–	3	–	3	.500	10	–	7	–	3	.575
Hofstra ‍‍‍	4	–	5	–	0	.444	10	–	7	–	1	.583
Delaware ‍‍‍	3	–	5	–	1	.389	4	–	13	–	1	.250
Towson ‍‍‍	3	–	6	–	0	.333	6	–	12	–	1	.342
Elon ‍‍‍	2	–	5	–	2	.333	7	–	9	–	3	.447
† – Conference champion ‡ – 2016 CAA Tournament champion y – Invited to the NCAA tournament As of 2016-11-17; Rankings from NSCAA

The 2016 Colonial Athletic Association women's soccer season was the 13th season in the conference since its inaugural season in 1993.

== Changes from 2015 ==
- None

== Teams ==
=== Stadia and locations ===
Team	Location	Stadium	Capacity
Charleston Cougars	Charleston, South Carolina	Patriots Point Soccer Stadium	2,200
Delaware Fighting Blue Hens	Newark, Delaware	Delaware Mini Stadium	1,500
Drexel Dragons	Philadelphia, Pennsylvania	Vidas Field	2,750
Elon Phoenix	Elon, North Carolina	Rudd Field	2,000
Hofstra Pride	Hempstead, New York	Hofstra Soccer Stadium	2,000
James Madison Dukes	Harrisonburg, Virginia	University Park	1,500
Northeastern Huskies	Boston, Massachusetts	Parsons Field	7,000
Towson Tigers	Towson, Maryland	Albert-Daly Field	2,271
UNC Wilmington Seahawks	Wilmington, North Carolina	UNCW Soccer Stadium	1,000
William & Mary Tribe	Williamsburg, Virginia	Albert-Daly Field	2,271

== Regular season ==
=== Rankings ===
Legend
Increase in ranking
Decrease in ranking
Not ranked previous week

		Pre	Wk 2	Wk 3	Wk 4	Wk 5	Wk 6	Wk 7	Wk 8	Wk 9	Wk 10	Wk 11	Wk 12	Wk 13	Final
Charleston	C														
Delaware	C														
Drexel	C														
Elon	C														
Hofstra	C														
James Madison	C														
Northeastern	C														
Towson	C														
UNC Wilmington	C														
William & Mary	C														

== Postseason ==
=== CAA tournament ===
Semifinals
1
4
2
3

Final

=== NCAA tournament ===
Seed	Region	School	1st round	2nd round	3rd round	Quarterfinals	Semifinals	Championship

== All-CAA awards and teams ==
2016 CAA Women's Soccer Individual Awards
Award	Recipient(s)
Player of the Year	
Coach of the Year	
Defensive Player of the Year	
Rookie of the Year	

2016 CAA Women's Soccer All-Conference Teams
First Team	Second Team	Rookie Team

== See also ==
- 2016 NCAA Division I women's soccer season
- 2016 CAA Women's Soccer Tournament
- 2016 Colonial Athletic Association men's soccer season
