= 2022 CAA women's soccer tournament =

- Classification: Division I
- Teams: 8
- Matches: 7
- Attendance: 2,390
- Site: Campus Sites, Hosted by Higher Seed
- Champions: Hofstra (8th title)
- Winning coach: Simon Riddiough (7th title)
- MVP: Anja Suttner (Hofstra)
- Broadcast: FloSports

2022 Colonial Athletic Association women's soccer standings
	Conf.						Overall
Team	W		L		T	PCT	W		L		T	PCT
Monmouth ‍†‍‍	6	–	1	–	2	.778	13	–	2	–	3	.806
Drexel ‍‍‍	5	–	2	–	2	.667	11	–	3	–	5	.711
Northeastern ‍‍‍	5	–	2	–	2	.667	10	–	6	–	4	.600
Elon ‍‍‍	5	–	3	–	1	.611	9	–	6	–	3	.583
Towson ‍‍‍	4	–	1	–	4	.667	12	–	3	–	5	.725
Stony Brook ‍‍‍	4	–	2	–	3	.611	7	–	8	–	4	.474
William & Mary ‍‍‍	3	–	3	–	3	.500	7	–	8	–	4	.474
Hofstra ‍‍‡‍^{y}	3	–	4	–	2	.444	10	–	8	–	4	.545
UNC Wilmington ‍‍‍	3	–	4	–	2	.444	7	–	7	–	3	.500
Charleston ‍‍‍	2	–	4	–	3	.389	8	–	7	–	3	.528
Delaware ‍‍‍	1	–	6	–	2	.222	2	–	11	–	5	.250
Hampton ‍‍‍	0	–	9	–	0	.000	2	–	14	–	1	.147
† – Conference champion ‡ – 2022 CAA Tournament champion y – Invited to the NCAA Tournament; As of December 6, 2022; Rankings from United Soccer Coaches Poll; Source:Colonial Athletic Association

The 2022 CAA women's soccer tournament was the postseason women's soccer tournament for the Colonial Athletic Association held from October 27 through November 5, 2022. The Quarterfinals and Semifinals of the tournament were hosted by the first and second seed and the final was hosted by the highest remaining seed. The eight-team single-elimination tournament consisted of two rounds based on seeding from regular season conference play. The defending champions were the Hofstra Pride, who successfully defendeded their title, despite being the eighth and final team to qualify for the tournament. Hofstra won the tournament by defeating Northeastern 2–1 in overtime the final. The conference tournament title was the eighth overall for the Hofstra women's soccer program and the seventh overall for head coach Simon Riddiough. Both Hofstra and Riddiough have won five of the last six CAA Tournaments. As tournament champions, Hofstra earned the CAA's automatic berth into the 2022 NCAA Division I women's soccer tournament.

== Seeding ==
Eight Colonial Athletic Association schools participated in the tournament. Teams were seeded by conference record. Multiple tiebreakers were required to determine seedings. The first tiebreaker was for the second and third seeds between Drexel and Northeastern who finished the regular season with identical 5–2–2 records. Drexel won the tiebreaker and was awarded hosting rights for two Quarterfinals and a Semifinal game as the second seed. Elon and Towson both finished the season with sixteen points and Elon won the tiebreaker to be the fourth seed. Finally there was a tiebreaker for the eighth and final seed between Hofstra and UNC Wilmington who both finished with 3–4–2 regular season records. Hofstra won the regular season matchup between the two teams 2–1 on October 13, and qualified for the tournament as the eighth seed.

Seed	School	Conference Record	Points
1	Monmouth	6–1–2	20
2	Drexel	5–2–2	17
3	Northeastern	5–2–2	17
4	Elon	5–3–1	16
5	Towson	4–1–4	16
6	Stony Brook	4–2–3	15
7	William & Mary	3–3–3	12
8	Hofstra	3–4–2	8

== Bracket ==
Quarterfinals; October 27
1	Monmouth	1 (4)
8	Hofstra (pen.)	1 (5)
4	Elon	1
5	Towson	2
2	Drexel	2
7	William & Mary	1
3	Northeastern	2
6	Stony Brook	1

Semifinals; October 30
8	Hofstra	2
5	Towson	0
2	Drexel	0
3	Northeastern	2

Championship; November 5
8	Hofstra (a.e.t.)	2
3	Northeastern	1

== Schedule ==
=== Quarterfinals ===
October 27	#2 Drexel	2–1	#7 William & Mary	Philadelphia, PA
2:00 p.m. ET	Delaney Lappin 50', 60'; Tori Yost (yellow card) 68'	Report	42' Cricket Basa	Stadium: Vidas Field; Attendance: 506; Referee: David Breckner; Assistant referees: Hector Rueda; Stefan Borota; Fourth official: Michael Weber

October 27	#1 Monmouth	1–1 (a.e.t.) (4–5 p)	#8 Hofstra	West Long Branch, NJ
3:00 p.m. ET	Jesi Rossman (yellow card) 9'; Summer Reimet 62'	Report	10' Anja Suttner	Stadium: Hesse Field; Attendance: 219; Referee: Greg DaMello; Assistant referees: DaQing Song; Ryan Clauss; Fourth official: Jan Halaska
	Penalties
	Chloe Ferreira (penalty scored); Rachel Ludwick (penalty scored); Maddison Perna (penalty scored); Lauren Karabin (penalty scored); Summer Reimet (penalty missed); Alexa Correa (penalty missed); Lauren Bruno (penalty missed)		(penalty scored) Anja Suttner; (penalty scored) Gabriella Marte; (penalty scored) Aimee Hodgson; (penalty missed) Millie Davies; (penalty scored) Allison Mendes; (penalty missed) Matilda Liljefors; (penalty scored) Krista Agostinello

October 27	#3 Northeastern	2–1	#6 Stony Brook	Philadelphia, PA
5:30 p.m. ET	Vivian Akyirem 14', 59'	Report	(yellow card) 31' Gabby Daniels; 71' (pen.) Reilly Rich; (yellow card) 89' Morayo Adenegan	Stadium: Vidas Field; Attendance: 158; Referee: Nickrod Fateh; Assistant referees: Larry Urwiler; Timmothy Bramble; Fourth official: Dustin Nguyen

October 27	#4 Elon	1–2	#5 Towson	West Long Branch, NJ
7:00 p.m. ET	Kennedy Jones (yellow card) 82'; Katie Lowe 88'	Report	22' Nia Christopher; 75' Phoebe Canoles; (yellow card) 88' Krista Louro	Stadium: Hesse Field; Attendance: 92; Referee: Mike DeFelice; Assistant referees: Brendan Quinn; Andrew Laplante; Fourth official: George Evanego

=== Semifinals ===
October 30	#2 Drexel	0–2	#3 Northeastern	Philadelphia, PA
2:00 p.m. ET	Delaney Lappin (yellow card) 61'	Report	(yellow card) 22', (goal) 51', 86' Vivian Akyirem; (yellow card) 33' Megan Putvinski; (yellow card) 60' Nina Dooley; (yellow card) 74' Team; (yellow card) 75' Jessie Hunt	Stadium: Vidas Field; Attendance: 427; Referee: Lucas Feathers; Assistant referees: Hector Rueda; Jay Hutchinson; Fourth official: Andrew Eitel

October 30	#5 Towson	0–2	#8 Hofstra	West Long Branch, NJ
2:00 p.m. ET	Rebecca Grobseibl (yellow card) 68'	Report	11' (pen.) Olivia Pearse; 55' Thorhildur Thorhallsdottir	Stadium: Hesse Field; Attendance: 123; Referee: Franco Somma; Assistant referees: Frank Severo; Wilmer Melendez; Fourth official: Jan Halaska

=== Final ===
November 5	#3 Northeastern	1–2 (a.e.t.)	#8 Hofstra	Brookline, MA
	Alexis Legowski 80', (yellow card) 83'	Report	61' Ellen Halseth; 109' Krista Agostinello	Stadium: Parsons Field; Attendance: 865; Referee: Shaun Papperman; Assistant referees: Danny Marques; Anthony Pedolzky; Fourth official: John Luk

== Statistics ==
=== Goalscorers ===
There were 18 goals scored in 7 matches, for an average of 2.57 goals per match (as of November 5, 2022).

4 goals

- Vivian Akyirem – Northeastern

2 goals

- Delaney Lappin – Drexel

1 goal

- Katie Lowe – Elon
- Krista Agostinello – Hofstra
- Ellen Halseth – Hofstra
- Olivia Pearse – Hofstra
- Anja Suttner – Hofstra
- Thorhildur Thorhallsdottir – Hofstra
- Summer Reimet – Monmouth
- Alexis Legowski – Northeastern
- Reilly Rich – Stony Brook
- Phoebe Canoles – Towson
- Nia Christopher – Towson
- Cricket Basa – William & Mary

== All-Tournament team ==
Player	Team
**Anja Suttner**	Hofstra
Krista Agostinello	Hofstra
Annabel Hoffman	Hofstra
Cailey Welch	Hofstra
Vivian Akyirem	Northeastern
Porter Dooley	Northeastern
Alexis Legowski	Northeastern
Delaney Lappin	Drexel
Madison Maxwell	Drexel
Nia Christopher	Towson
Riley Melendez	Towson

MVP in bold
