= 2023 CAA women's soccer tournament =

- Classification: Division I
- Teams: 6
- Matches: 5
- Attendance: 2,277
- Site: Campus Sites, Hosted by Higher Seed
- Champions: Towson (1st title)
- Winning coach: Katherine Vettori (1st title)
- MVP: Riley Melendez (Towson)
- Broadcast: FloFC

2023 Coastal Athletic Association women's soccer standings
	Conf.						Overall
Team	W		L		T	PCT	W		L		T	PCT
Towson ‍†‍‡‍^{y}	9	–	1	–	2	.833	15	–	3	–	2	.800
Hofstra ‍‍‍	9	–	2	–	1	.792	12	–	5	–	1	.694
Monmouth ‍‍‍	8	–	2	–	2	.750	11	–	6	–	2	.632
Northeastern ‍‍‍	6	–	2	–	4	.667	8	–	4	–	6	.611
William & Mary ‍‍‍	6	–	3	–	3	.625	9	–	4	–	7	.625
Stony Brook ‍‍‍	4	–	4	–	4	.500	6	–	6	–	6	.500
UNC Wilmington ‍‍‍	4	–	5	–	3	.458	5	–	9	–	3	.382
Delaware ‍‍‍	2	–	3	–	7	.458	5	–	5	–	8	.500
Drexel ‍‍‍	3	–	6	–	3	.375	7	–	8	–	3	.472
Campbell ‍‍‍	2	–	4	–	6	.417	4	–	6	–	7	.441
Charleston ‍‍‍	2	–	6	–	4	.333	2	–	10	–	5	.265
Elon ‍‍‍	2	–	7	–	3	.292	3	–	9	–	5	.324
Hampton ‍‍‍	0	–	12	–	0	.000	0	–	18	–	0	.000
† – Conference champion ‡ – 2023 CAA Tournament champion y – Invited to the NCAA Tournament; As of December 5, 2023; Rankings from United Soccer Coaches Poll; Source: Coastal Athletic Association

The 2023 CAA women's soccer tournament was the postseason women's soccer tournament for the Coastal Athletic Association held from October 26 through November 4, 2023. The First Round and Semifinals of the tournament were hosted by the first and second seed and the final was hosted by the highest remaining seed. The six-team single-elimination tournament consisted of three rounds based on seeding from regular season conference play. The defending champions were the Hofstra Pride, who were unable to defend their title, falling to Monmouth in the Semifinals. Towson won the tournament by defeating Monmouth in the Final, 2–1. The conference tournament title was the first overall for the Towson women's soccer program and the first for head coach Katherine Vettori. As tournament champions, Towson earned the CAA's automatic berth into the 2023 NCAA Division I women's soccer tournament.

== Seeding ==
Six Coastal Athletic Association schools participated in the tournament. Teams were seeded by conference record. No tiebreakers were required as all teams finished with unique regular season conference records. Towson won the regular season title for the first time in program history.

Seed	School	Conference Record	Points
1	Towson	9–1–2	29
2	Hofstra	9–2–1	28
3	Monmouth	8–2–2	26
4	Northeastern	6–2–4	22
5	William & Mary	6–3–3	21
6	Stony Brook	4–4–4	16

== Bracket ==
Quarterfinals; October 26
4	Northeastern	1 (6)
5	William & Mary (pen.)	1 (7)
3	Monmouth	3
6	Stony Brook	0

Semifinals; October 29
1	Towson	1
5	William & Mary	0
2	Hofstra	1
3	Monmouth (a.e.t.)	2

Championship; November 4
1	Towson	2
3	Monmouth	1

== Schedule ==
=== First Round ===
October 26	#3 Monmouth	3–0	#6 Stony Brook	Hempstead, NY
4:00 p.m. ET	Marisa Tava 75'; Liza Suydam 83'; Chloe Messer 85'	Report	(yellow card) 89' Kerry Pearson	Stadium: Hofstra Stadium; Attendance: 100; Referee: Greg Demello; Assistant referees: Bruno Mozzo; Giovanni Lepore; Fourth official: Jason Silver

October 26	#4 Northeastern	1–1 (a.e.t.) (6–7 p)	#5 William & Mary	Towson, MD
7:00 p.m. ET	Vivian Akyirem 79', (yellow card) 94'	Report	30' Ivey Crain	Stadium: Tiger Field; Attendance: 227; Referee: John McCloskey; Assistant referees: Conor McCloskey; Michael Kelley
	Penalties
	Jessie Hunt (penalty scored); Megan Putvinski (penalty scored); Vivian Akyirem (penalty scored); Maggie Cochran (penalty scored); Faith Rosenblatt (penalty scored); Holland Stam (penalty scored); Addison Davis (penalty missed)		(penalty scored) Jillian O'Toole; (penalty scored) Nicole Sellers; (penalty scored) Kayleigh Shackford; (penalty scored) Lindsay Wilson; (penalty scored) Elaina Longjohn; (penalty scored) Kenna Zier; (penalty scored) Zoe Doughty

=== Semifinals ===
October 29	#1 Towson	1–0	#5 William & Mary	Towson, MD
1:00 p.m.	Jacey Miller (yellow card) 24'; Nia Christopher 87'	Report	(yellow card) 76' Jillian O'Toole; (yellow card) 85' Leah Iglesias	Stadium: Tiger Field; Attendance: 727; Referee: Mike De Felice; Assistant referees: Hugo Menguy; Ryan Meyer; Fourth official: Eric Bray

October 29	#2 Hofstra	1–2 (a.e.t.)	#3 Monmouth	Hempstead, NY
1:00 p.m.	Thorhildur Thorhallsdottir 22'; Millie Davies (yellow card) 64'	Report	76' Liza Suydam; 108' Summer Reimet	Stadium: Hofstra Stadium; Attendance: 201; Referee: Leah Hayes; Assistant referees: Greg Muhs; Chris Muhs; Fourth official: Jan Halaska

=== Final ===
November 5	#1 Towson	2–1	#3 Monmouth	Towson, MD
1:00 p.m. ET	Nia Christopher 24'; Phoebe Canoles 80'	Report	16' Chloe Ferriera; (yellow card) 55' Team	Stadium: Tiger Field; Attendance: 1,022; Referee: David Breckner; Assistant referees: Jason Blight; Conor McCloskey; Fourth official: Peter Dhima

== Statistics ==
=== Goalscorers ===
There were 12 goals scored in 5 matches, for an average of 2.4 goals per match (as of November 5, 2023).

2 goals

- Liza Suydam – Monmouth
- Nia Christopher – Towson

1 goal

- Thorhildur Thorhallsdottir – Hofstra
- Chloe Ferriera – Monmouth
- Chloe Messer – Monmouth
- Summer Reimet – Monmouth
- Marisa Tava – Monmouth
- Vivian Akyirem – Northeastern
- Phoebe Canoles – Towson
- Ivey Crain – William & Mary

== All-Tournament team ==
Player	Team
Phoebe Canoles	Towson
Nia Christopher	Towson
Maja Hansson	Towson
**Riley Melendez**	Towson
Lauren Bruno	Monmouth
Liza Suydam	Monmouth
Marisa Tava	Monmouth
Millie Davies	Hofstra
Dagny Run Petursdottir	Hofstra
Ginny Delacruz	William & Mary
Nicole Sellers	William & Mary

MVP in bold
