= 2025 CAA women's soccer tournament =

American college soccer tournament

- Classification: Division I
- Teams: 6
- Matches: 5
- Site: Campus Sites (Higher Seed)
- Champions: Elon (2nd title)
- Winning coach: Neil Payne (2nd title)
- MVP: Katie Bisgrove (Elon)
- Broadcast: ESPN+

2025 Coastal Athletic Association women's soccer standings
	Conf.						Overall
Team	W		L		T	PCT	W		L		T	PCT
North
Monmouth ‍†‍‍	5	–	3	–	1	.611	10	–	6	–	2	.611
Stony Brook ‍‍‍	5	–	4	–	0	.556	12	–	6	–	2	.650
Hofstra ‍‍‍	3	–	3	–	3	.500	6	–	5	–	7	.528
Towson ‍‍‍	3	–	3	–	3	.500	5	–	5	–	6	.500
Northeastern ‍‍‍	2	–	4	–	3	.389	3	–	7	–	6	.375
Drexel ‍‍‍	2	–	5	–	2	.333	3	–	7	–	8	.389
South
UNC Wilmington ‍†‍‍	7	–	0	–	2	.889	11	–	3	–	4	.722
William & Mary ‍‍‍	5	–	2	–	2	.667	7	–	7	–	4	.500
Elon ‍‍‡‍^{y}	4	–	2	–	3	.611	11	–	3	–	7	.690
Charleston ‍‍‍	4	–	3	–	2	.556	8	–	6	–	3	.559
Campbell ‍‍‍	2	–	4	–	3	.389	4	–	7	–	5	.406
Hampton ‍‍‍	0	–	9	–	0	.000	5	–	12	–	1	.306
† – Conference champion ‡ – 2025 CAA Tournament champion y – Invited to the NCAA Tournament; As of December 9, 2025; Rankings from United Soccer Coaches Poll; Source: Coastal Athletic Association

The 2025 CAA women's soccer tournament was the postseason women's soccer tournament for the Coastal Athletic Association that was held from October 30 to November 9, 2025. The five-match tournament had the quarterfinals and semifinals hosted by the higher seeds of the North and South Divisions, while the final was hosted by the highest remaining seed. The six-team single-elimination tournament consisted of three rounds based on seeding from regular season conference play. The defending champions were Stony Brook, who won their first title in the previous season. Stony Brook failed to defend their title, as they were defeated by Elon on penalties in the final. It was the second title for Elon and for head coach Neil Payne.

As tournament champions, Elon earned the CAA's automatic berth into the 2025 NCAA Division I women's soccer tournament.

== Seeding ==
The top three teams of the North and South Divisions in the regular season earned a spot in the tournament. Teams were seeded based on their regular season conference records. The #1 seeds from the two divisions received a bye into the semifinals.

=== North Division ===
A tiebreaker was required in the North Division to determine whether Hofstra or Towson would take the third seed, as both teams finished with a 3–3–3 record. Hofstra and Towson drew their regular season meeting 1–1 on September 28. Hofstra secured the third North Division seed thanks to their better record against Stony Brook in the regular season, as Hofstra won 3–2 on October 26, while Towson were defeated 3–1 on October 2.

Seed	School	Conference Record	Points
1	Monmouth	5–3–1	16
2	Stony Brook	5–4–0	15
3	Hofstra	3–3–3	12

=== South Division ===
No tiebreakers were required for the South Division, as each team finished with a unique regular season record.

Seed	School	Conference Record	Points
1	UNC Wilmington	7–0–2	23
2	William & Mary	5–2–2	17
3	Elon	4–2–3	15

== Bracket ==
Quarterfinals; Thursday, Oct. 30
N2	Stony Brook (a.e.t.)	2
N3	Hofstra	1
S2	William & Mary	0
S3	Elon	1

Semifinals; Sunday, Nov. 2
N1	Monmouth	0
N2	Stony Brook	1
S1	UNC Wilmington	0 (5)
S3	Elon (pen.)	0 (6)

Final; Sunday, Nov. 9
N2	Stony Brook	1 (5)
S3	Elon (pen.)	1 (6)

== Schedule ==
=== Quarterfinals ===
October 30, 2025	N#2 Stony Brook	2–1 (a.e.t.)	N#3 Hofstra	Stony Brook, NY
14:00 EST	Reilly Rich 31', 100' (pen.)	Report	Mathilde Braithwaite 56'	Stadium: Kenneth P. LaValle Stadium; Attendance: 82; Referee: Kieran Foley; Assistant referees: Wilmer Melendez; Bobby Baldwin; Fourth official: Sean Lyons

October 30, 2025	S#2 William & Mary	0–1	S#3 Elon	Williamsburg, VA
19:00 EST		Report	Ashlee Brehio 5'	Stadium: Martin Family Stadium at Albert-Daly Field; Attendance: 403; Referee: Brian Miller; Assistant referees: Mark Remsa; Josh Pitt; Fourth official: Ryan Williams

=== Semifinals ===
November 2, 2025	N#1 Monmouth	0–1	N#2 Stony Brook	West Long Branch, NJ
13:00 EST		Report	Hannah Maracina 23'; Eva Sprewell (yellow card) 73' (yellow-red card) 75'	Stadium: Hesse Field on The Great Lawn; Attendance: 497; Referee: Zachary Smith; Assistant referees: Kenny Freeman; Erik Backstrom; Fourth official: Alexander Wang

November 2, 2025	S#1 UNC Wilmington	0–0 (a.e.t.) (5–6 p)	S#3 Elon	Wilmington, NC
13:00 EST	Ava Chuderewicz (yellow card) 18'; Rachel Fry (yellow card) 92'	Report	Jordan Green (yellow card) 7'; Jess Beck (yellow card) 37'; Gabby Hoschek (yellow card) 105'	Stadium: UNCW Soccer Stadium; Attendance: 656; Referee: David Erbacher; Assistant referees: Rick Rogers; Aaron Hormuth; Fourth official: Eion Dockery
	Penalties
	Lindsay Lenhard (penalty scored); Viktoria Hankova (penalty scored); Megumi Umemoto (penalty scored); Kayla Adams (penalty scored); Taylor O'Brien (penalty scored); Hailey Longwell (penalty missed)		(penalty scored) Gabby Hoschek; (penalty scored) Ava Hellner; (penalty scored) Ashlee Brehio; (penalty scored) Lauren McCauley; (penalty scored) Jess Beck; (penalty scored) Isabel DiPrima

=== Final ===
November 9, 2025	N#2 Stony Brook	1–1 (a.e.t.) (5–6 p)	S#3 Elon	Stony Brook, NY
13:00 EST	89'; Hedvig Helling (yellow card) 109'	Report	Isa Murdock 68'	Stadium: Kenneth P. LaValle Stadium; Attendance: 406; Referee: Shaun Papperman; Assistant referees: Brendan Quinn; Greg Muhs; Fourth official: Dave Breckner
	Penalties
	Reilly Rich (penalty scored); Linn Beck (penalty missed); Abigail Roche (penalty scored); Sammy Hannwacker (penalty scored); Leah Rifas (penalty scored); Hannah Maracina (penalty scored); Ashley Manor (penalty missed)		(penalty missed) Gabby Hoschek; (penalty scored) Ava Hellner; (penalty scored) Ashlee Brehio; (penalty scored) Lauren McCauley; (penalty scored) Jess Beck; (penalty scored) Isabel DiPrima; (penalty scored) Abby Brinker

== Statistics ==
=== Goalscorers ===
There were 7 goals scored in 5 matches, for an average of 1.4 goals per match (as of November 9, 2025).

2 goals

- Reilly Rich – Stony Brook

1 goal

- Mathilde Braithwaite – Hofstra
- Ashlee Brehio – Elon
- Hannah Maracina – Stony Brook
- Isa Murdock – Elon

== All Tournament Team ==
Player	Team
**Katie Bisgrove**	Elon
Linn Beck	Stony Brook
Ashlee Brehio	Elon
Alyssa Chuderewicz	UNC Wilmington
Loren Gehret	Monmouth
Grace Gelhaus	Elon
Ashley Lavrich	Monmouth
Macy Lutz	UNC Wilmington
Isa Murdock	Elon
Reilly Rich	Stony Brook
Abigail Roche	Stony Brook

MVP in bold
