= 2017 CAA women's soccer tournament =

- Classification: Division I
- Teams: 6
- Matches: 5
- Attendance: 1,618
- Site: Hofstra University Soccer Stadium; Hempstead, New York (Semifinals & Final)
- Champions: Hofstra (4th title)
- Winning coach: Simon Riddiough (3rd title)

2017 Colonial Athletic Association women's soccer standings
	Conf.						Overall
Team	W		L		T	PCT	W		L		T	PCT
Hofstra ‍†‍‡‍^{y}	9	–	0	–	0	1.000	15	–	4	–	2	.762
Drexel ‍‍‍	6	–	2	–	1	.722	11	–	7	–	1	.605
Northeastern ‍‍‍	5	–	1	–	3	.722	13	–	6	–	3	.659
James Madison ‍‍‍	4	–	5	–	0	.444	9	–	10	–	0	.474
William & Mary ‍‍‍	3	–	4	–	2	.444	8	–	10	–	2	.450
College of Charleston ‍‍‍	3	–	5	–	1	.389	8	–	9	–	1	.472
Elon ‍‍‍	2	–	4	–	3	.389	9	–	6	–	4	.579
Delaware ‍‍‍	3	–	6	–	0	.333	6	–	10	–	2	.389
Towson ‍‍‍	2	–	6	–	1	.278	5	–	11	–	3	.342
UNC Wilmington ‍‍‍	2	–	6	–	1	.278	6	–	11	–	2	.368
† – Conference champion ‡ – 2017 CAA Tournament champion y – Invited to the NCAA Tournament; As of November 10, 2017; Rankings from United Soccer Coaches Poll; Source:Colonial Athletic Association

The 2017 CAA women's soccer tournament was the postseason women's soccer tournament for the Colonial Athletic Association held from October 29 through November 5, 2017. The tournament quarterfinals were held at campus sites, while the semifinals and final took place at Hofstra University Soccer Stadium in Hempstead, New York. The six-team single-elimination tournament consisted of three rounds based on seeding from regular season conference play. The defending champions were the Northeastern Huskies, but they failed to defend their title, losing 2–1 to the Hofstra Pride in the final. The conference tournament title was the fourth for the Hofstra women's soccer program and the third for head coach Simon Riddiough.

== Bracket ==
Quarterfinals; Sunday, Oct. 29
4	James Madison	3
5	William & Mary	4
3	Northeastern	6
6	Charleston	0

Semifinals; Friday, Nov. 3
1	Hofstra	1
5	William & Mary	0
2	Drexel	0
3	Northeastern	2

Final; Sunday, Nov. 5
1	Hofstra	2
3	Northeastern	1

== Schedule ==
=== First Round ===
October 29, 2017	#3 Northeastern	6–0	#6 Charleston	Brookline, Massachusetts
1:00 p.m. EDT	Nicole Gorman 4', 46'; Hannah Lopiccolo 6'; Hannah Rosenblatt 63', 89'; Emily Evangelista 85'	Report		Stadium: Parsons Field; Attendance: 176; Referee: Jeffrey Davis; Assistant referees: Luis Cutely; Jessica Remmes

October 29, 2017	#4 James Madison	3–4	#5 William & Mary	Harrisonburg, Virginia
1:00 p.m. EDT	Kylie Hegemier 41'; Ginger Deel 59'; Haley Crawford 69'	Report	5' Sami Grasso; 13' Mackenzie Kober; 54' Rachel Moore; 76' Elysse Branton	Stadium: Sentara Park; Attendance: 206; Referee: Ryan White; Assistant referees: Paul Radlinski; Tony Tribotti

=== Semifinals ===
November 3, 2017	#2 Drexel	0–2	#3 Northeastern	Hempstead, New York
4:30 p.m. EDT		Report	25' Lizzie George; 30' Hannah Rosenblatt	Stadium: Hofstra University Soccer Stadium; Referee: Mike Stutt; Assistant referees: Mike Schatzel; Bill Dittmar; Fourth official: Joe Manfre

November 3, 2017	#1 Hofstra	1–0	#5 William & Mary	Hempstead, New York
7:00 p.m. EDT	Lucy Porter 63'	Report		Stadium: Hofstra University Soccer Stadium; Attendance: 823; Referee: Steve Ambrus; Assistant referees: Saam Jalayer; Mike Godi; Fourth official: Steve Levin

=== Final ===
November 5, 2017	#1 Hofstra	2–1	#3 Northeastern	Hempstead, New York
1:00 p.m. EST	Lucy Porter 2'; Jenn Buoncore 32'	Report	16' Kerri Zerfoss	Stadium: Hofstra University Soccer Stadium; Attendance: 413; Referee: Bill Dittmar; Assistant referees: Mike Schatzel; Mike Stutt; Fourth official: Joe Manfre

== Statistics ==
=== Goalscorers ===
3 Goals

- Hannah Rosenblatt – Northeastern

2 Goals

- Nicole Gorman – Northeastern
- Lucy Porter – Hofstra

1 Goal

- Elysse Branton – William and Mary
- Jenn Buoncore – Hofstra
- Haley Crawford – Northeastern
- Ginger Deel – Northeastern
- Emily Evangelista – Northeastern
- Sami Grasso – William and Mary
- Lizzie George – Northeastern
- Kylie Hegemier – James Madison
- Mackenzie Kober – William and Mary
- Hannah Lopiccolo – Northeastern
- Rachel Moore – William and Mary
- Kerri Zerfoss – Northeastern

== See also ==
- Colonial Athletic Association
- 2017 CAA Men's Soccer Tournament
