= 2019 CAA women's soccer tournament =

- Classification: Division I
- Teams: 6
- Matches: 5
- Attendance: 760
- Site: Campus sites, hosted by higher seed
- Champions: Hofstra (6th title)
- Winning coach: Simon Riddiough (5th title)
- MVP: Lucy Porter (Hofstra)
- Broadcast: FloSports

2019 Colonial Athletic Association women's soccer standings
	Conf.						Overall
Team	W		L		T	PCT	W		L		T	PCT
Hofstra ‍†‍‡‍^{y}	7	–	0	–	2	.889	16	–	4	–	2	.773
Delaware ‍‍‍	7	–	2	–	0	.778	12	–	7	–	0	.632
UNC Wilmington ‍‍‍	6	–	2	–	1	.722	10	–	6	–	1	.618
Northeastern ‍‍‍	5	–	3	–	1	.611	8	–	10	–	1	.447
Elon ‍‍‍	5	–	3	–	1	.611	12	–	6	–	2	.650
James Madison ‍‍‍	4	–	4	–	1	.500	9	–	12	–	1	.432
William & Mary ‍‍‍	3	–	5	–	1	.389	5	–	11	–	2	.333
Charleston ‍‍‍	2	–	7	–	0	.222	8	–	10	–	0	.444
Drexel ‍‍‍	1	–	7	–	1	.167	5	–	11	–	3	.342
Towson ‍‍‍	1	–	8	–	0	.111	4	–	13	–	1	.250
† – Conference champion ‡ – 2019 CAA Tournament champion y – Invited to the NCAA tournament As of December 9, 2019; Rankings from United Soccer Coaches Poll; Source:Colonial Athletic Association

The 2019 CAA women's soccer tournament was the postseason women's soccer tournament for the Colonial Athletic Association held from November 1 through November 9, 2019. The tournament was held at campus sites, with the higher seed hosting each game. The defending champions were the Hofstra Pride, who successfully defended their title, beating the James Madison Dukes 5–1 in the final. The conference tournament title was the sixth overall for the Hofstra women's soccer program and the fifth overall for head coach Simon Riddiough. Both Hofstra and Riddiough have won three straight CAA Tournaments.

== Bracket ==
Quarterfinals; Friday, Nov. 1
4	Northeastern	1
5	Elon	2
3	UNC Wilmington	2
6	James Madison	3

Semifinals; Sunday, Nov. 3
1	Hofstra	3
5	Elon	1
2	Delaware	2
6	James Madison	3^{OT}

Final; Saturday, Nov. 9
1	Hofstra	5
6	James Madison	1

== Schedule ==
=== First Round ===
November 1, 2019	#4 Northeastern	1–2	#5 Elon	Hempstead, NY
1:00 p.m. EST	Kayla McCauley 62'	Report	6' Hannah Doherty; 87' Jessica Carrieri	Stadium: Hofstra University Soccer Stadium; Attendance: 87; Referee: Michael Lee; Assistant referees: Victor Borges; Nate Penn; Fourth official: Alexandru Focea

November 1, 2019	#3 UNC Wilmington	2–3	#6 James Madison	Newark, DE
1:00 p.m. EST	Morgan Nanni 15', (yellow card) 29'; Ashley Johnson (yellow card) 85'; Audrey Harding 89'	Report	24' (pen.) Haley Crawford; (yellow card) 28' Phoebe Dinga; 48', (yellow card) 65' Ginger Deel; 50' Maia Foley; (yellow card) 61' Ashby Larkin; (yellow card) 73' Iris Rabot	Stadium: Grant Stadium; Attendance: 152; Referee: Mike De Felice; Assistant referees: Rich Barnes; Jay Hutchinson; Fourth official: Sharon Gingrich

=== Semifinals ===
November 3, 2019	#1 Hofstra	3–1	#5 Elon	Hempstead, NY
1:00 p.m. EST	Sabrina Bryan 2', 75'; Anja Suttner 38'; Megan Fisher (yellow card) 42'	Report	78' Carson Jones	Stadium: Hofstra University Soccer Stadium; Attendance: 278; Referee: Michael McBride; Assistant referees: Nate Penn; Tim Shaw; Fourth official: Sean Lyons

November 3, 2019	#2 Delaware	2–3 (a.e.t.)	#6 James Madison	Newark, DE
1:00 p.m. EST	Sara D'Appolonia 7'; Riley Dixon 18'	Report	13' Hannah Coulling; (yellow card) 72' Claire Meiser; 88' Ebony Wiseman; 99' Sophie Brause	Stadium: Grant Stadium; Attendance: 243; Referee: Matt Kreitzer; Assistant referees: Dilok Boonmema; Eric Rolf; Fourth official: John McCloskey

=== Final ===
November 9, 2019	#1 Hofstra	5–1	#6 James Madison	Hempstead, NY
1:00 p.m. EST	Lucy Porter 3', 88'; Megan Fisher 38'; Sabrina Bryan 47'; Lucy Shepherd 57'	Report	(yellow card) 52' Lily Stavisky; 68' Iris Rabot	Stadium: Hofstra University Soccer Stadium; Referee: Adam Kilpatrick; Assistant referees: Nate Penn; Keith Fisher; Fourth official: Sima Draguca

== Statistics ==
=== Goalscorers ===
3 goals

- Sabrina Bryan (Hofstra)

2 goals

- Lucy Porter (Hofstra)

1 goal

- Sophie Brause (James Madison)
- Jessica Carrieri (Elon)
- Hannah Coulling (James Madison)
- Haley Crawford (James Madison)
- Sara D'Appolonia (Delaware)
- Ginger Deel (James Madison)
- Riley Dixon (Delaware)
- Hannah Doherty (Elon)
- Megan Fisher (Hofstra)
- Maia Foley (James Madison)
- Audrey Harding (UNC Wilmington)
- Carson Jones (Elon)
- Kayla McCauley (Northeastern)
- Morgan Nanni (UNC Wilmington)
- Iris Rabot (James Madison)
- Lucy Shepherd (Hofstra)
- Anja Suttner (Hofstra)
- Ebony Wiseman (James Madison)

== All-Tournament team ==
Player	Team
Sabrina Bryan	Hofstra
Jordan Littleboy	Hofstra
**Lucy Porter**	Hofstra
Bella Richards	Hofstra
Ginger Deel	James Madison
Iris Rabot	James Madison
Ebony Wiseman	James Madison
Sara D'Appolonia	Delaware
Kamryn Stablein	Delaware
Hannah Doherty	Elon
Carson Jones	Elon

MVP in bold

== See also ==
- Colonial Athletic Association
- 2019 CAA Men's Soccer Tournament
