= 2021 CAA women's soccer tournament =

- Classification: Division I
- Teams: 4
- Matches: 3
- Attendance: 1,075
- Site: Rudd Field; Elon, NC
- Champions: Hofstra (7th title)
- Winning coach: Simon Riddiough (6th title)
- MVP: Lucy Porter (Hofstra)
- Broadcast: FloSports

2021 Colonial Athletic Association women's soccer standings
	Conf.						Overall
Team	W		L		T	PCT	W		L		T	PCT
UNC Wilmington ‍†‍‍	7	–	2	–	0	.778	11	–	4	–	1	.719
Hofstra ‍‍‡‍^{y}	6	–	2	–	1	.722	17	–	4	–	1	.795
James Madison ‍‍‍	6	–	3	–	0	.667	9	–	9	–	1	.500
Northeastern ‍‍‍	5	–	4	–	0	.556	9	–	9	–	1	.500
Elon ‍‍‍	4	–	3	–	2	.556	9	–	6	–	2	.588
Towson ‍‍‍	3	–	5	–	1	.389	8	–	7	–	3	.528
William & Mary ‍‍‍	2	–	4	–	3	.389	4	–	9	–	3	.344
Drexel ‍‍‍	2	–	5	–	2	.333	6	–	8	–	3	.441
Delaware ‍‍‍	2	–	5	–	2	.333	5	–	11	–	2	.333
College of Charleston ‍‍‍	2	–	6	–	1	.278	3	–	12	–	3	.250
† – Conference champion ‡ – 2021 CAA Tournament champion y – Invited to the NCAA Tournament; As of December 7, 2021; Rankings from United Soccer Coaches Poll; Source:Colonial Athletic Association

The 2021 CAA women's soccer tournament was the postseason women's soccer tournament for the Colonial Athletic Association held from November 4 through November 7, 2021. The tournament was held at Rudd Field in Elon, North Carolina. The four-team single-elimination tournament consisted of two rounds based on seeding from regular season conference play. The defending champions were the Elon Phoenix, who were unable to defend their title, after not qualifying for the tournament and finishing fifth in the regular season standings. The Hofstra Pride won the tournament by defeating Northeastern 2–1 in the final. The conference tournament title was the seventh overall for the Hofstra women's soccer program and the sixth overall for head coach Simon Riddiough. Both Hofstra and Riddiough have won four of the last five CAA Tournaments. As tournament champions, Hofstra earned the CAA's automatic berth into the 2021 NCAA Division I Women's Soccer Tournament.

== Seeding ==
Four CAA schools participated in the tournament. Teams were seeded by conference record. No tiebreakers were required as each team finished on a unique points total.

Seed	School	Conference Record	Points
1	UNC Wilmington	7–2–0	21
2	Hofstra	6–2–1	19
3	James Madison	6–3–0	18
4	Northeastern	5–4–0	15

== Bracket ==
Semifinals; Thursday, November 4
1	UNC Wilmington	0
4	Northeastern	1
2	Hofstra	1
3	James Madison	0

Final; Sunday, November 7
4	Northeastern	1
2	Hofstra	2

== Schedule ==
=== Semifinals ===
November 4, 2021	#1 UNC Wilmington	0–1	#4 Northeastern	Elon, NC
4:00 p.m. EST		Report	(yellow card) 23' Alexis Legowski; 88' Kayla McCauley	Stadium: Rudd Field; Attendance: 315; Referee: Mark Remsa; Assistant referees: Aaron Gallagher; Jude Carr; Fourth official: Justin Howard

November 4, 2021	#2 Hofstra	1–0	#3 James Madison	Elon, NC
7:30 p.m. EST	Miri Taylor (yellow card) 54'; Lucy Shepherd 67'	Report	(yellow card) 42' Team	Stadium: Rudd Field; Attendance: 413; Referee: JC Griggs; Assistant referees: Forrest Ambrose; David McPhun; Fourth official: Hudson Owens

=== Final ===
November 7, 2021	#2 Hofstra	2–1	#4 Northeastern	Elon, NC
1:00 p.m. EST	Lucy Shepherd 25'; Miri Taylor 59'; Olivia Pearse (yellow card) 74'	Report	18' Rose Kaefer; (yellow card) 62' Kayla McCauley; (yellow card) 79' Megan Putvinski	Stadium: Rudd Field; Attendance: 347; Referee: Matthew Kreitzer; Assistant referees: Jude Carr; Heath Hixson; Fourth official: Abbas Piran

== Statistics ==
=== Goalscorers ===
There were 5 goals scored in 3 matches, for an average of 1.67 goals per match (as of November 7, 2021).

2 goals

- Lucy Shepherd – Hofstra

1 goal

- Miri Taylor – Hofstra
- Rose Kaefer – Northeastern
- Kayla McCauley – Northeastern

== All-Tournament team ==
Player	Team
**Lucy Porter**	Hofstra
Jordan Littleboy	Hofstra
Lucy Shepherd	Hofstra
Miri Taylor	Hofstra
Alexis Legowski	Northeastern
Mikenna McManus	Northeastern
Julianne Ross	Northeastern
Audrey Harding	UNCW
Sophie Trepohl	UNCW
Brittany Munson	James Madison
Lexi Vanderlinden	James Madison

MVP in bold
