= 2018 CAA women's soccer tournament =

- Classification: Division I
- Teams: 6
- Matches: 5
- Attendance: 1,219
- Site: Campus sites
- Champions: Hofstra (5th title)
- Winning coach: Simon Riddiough (4th title)
- MVP: Madeline Anderson (Hofstra)
- Broadcast: None

2018 Colonial Athletic Association women's soccer standings
	Conf.						Overall
Team	W		L		T	PCT	W		L		T	PCT
James Madison ‍†‍‍	7	–	1	–	1	.833	11	–	8	–	1	.575
Northeastern ‍‍‍	7	–	2	–	0	.778	10	–	9	–	1	.525
Hofstra ‍‍‡‍^{y}	6	–	2	–	1	.722	16	–	5	–	1	.750
Charleston ‍‍‍	5	–	3	–	1	.611	11	–	8	–	1	.575
Drexel ‍‍‍	4	–	4	–	1	.500	7	–	7	–	5	.500
Delaware ‍‍‍	3	–	5	–	1	.389	4	–	12	–	2	.278
UNC Wilmington ‍‍‍	3	–	5	–	1	.389	9	–	6	–	1	.594
William & Mary ‍‍‍	3	–	5	–	1	.389	6	–	10	–	1	.382
Towson ‍‍‍	1	–	6	–	1	.188	4	–	12	–	3	.289
Elon ‍‍‍	1	–	7	–	1	.167	3	–	10	–	4	.294
† – Conference champion ‡ – 2018 CAA Tournament champion y – Invited to the NCAA tournament As of November 13, 2018; Rankings from United Soccer Coaches Poll; Source:Colonial Athletic Association

The 2018 CAA women's soccer tournament was the postseason women's soccer tournament for the Colonial Athletic Association held from October 26 to November 3, 2018. The tournament was held at campus sites, with the higher seed hosting each game. The defending champions were the Hofstra, who successfully defended their title, beating the James Madison Dukes 2–0 in the final. The conference tournament title was the fifth for the Hofstra women's soccer program and the fourth for head coach Simon Riddiough.

== Bracket ==
Quarterfinals; Friday, Oct. 26
4	Charleston	3
5	Drexel	2
3	Hofstra	1
6	Delaware	0

Semifinals; Sunday, Oct. 28
1	James Madison	2
4	Charleston	1
2	Northeastern	0
3	Hofstra	1

Final; Saturday, Nov. 3
1	James Madison	0
3	Hofstra	2

== Schedule ==
=== First round ===
October 26, 2018	#4 Charleston	3–2 (a.e.t.)	#5 Drexel	Harrisonburg, Virginia
1:00 p.m. EST	Laura Ortega 5' 104'; Maddie Brill-Edwards 52'	Report	Morgan Rees 69'; Kiera Hennessy 86'; Maggie Daeche (yellow card) 88'	Stadium: Sentara Park; Attendance: 131; Referee: Sergio Gonzalez; Assistant referees: Tony Tribotti; Shaun Agee

October 26, 2018	#3 Hofstra	1–0	#6 Delaware	Brookline, Massachusetts
1:00 p.m. EST	Sabrina Bryan 32'	Report		Stadium: Parsons Field; Attendance: 127; Referee: Krista McCann; Assistant referees: Leah Hayes; Jerry Hobbs

=== Semifinals ===
October 28, 2018	#1 James Madison	2–1	#4 Charleston	Harrisonburg, Virginia
1:00 p.m. EST	Stephanie Hendrie 11'; Haley Crawford 79'	Report	Raymara Barreto 15'	Stadium: Sentara Park; Attendance: 322; Referee: Michael Schatzel; Assistant referees: Mark Heisel; Anthony Tribotti; Fourth official: Andrew Halley

October 28, 2018	#2 Northeastern	0–1	#3 Hofstra	Brookline, Massachusetts
1:00 p.m. EST	Eve Goulet (yellow card) 75'; Valent Soares Gache (yellow card) 83'	Report	Lucy Porter 8'	Stadium: Parsons Field; Attendance: 178; Referee: Miguel Lara; Assistant referees: Devin Miller; Taha Nasser; Fourth official: Michael Correia

=== Final ===
November 3, 2018	#1 James Madison	0–2	#3 Hofstra	Harrisonburg, Virginia
1:00 p.m. EST	Stephanie Hendrie (yellow card) 32'; Phoebe Dinga (yellow card) 36'; Team (yellow card) 43'; Hannah McShea (yellow card) 73'; Lizzy Lazzaro (yellow card) 78'	Report	Lucy Porter 13'; Sabrina Bryan 56'	Stadium: Sentara Park; Attendance: 461; Referee: Sergio Gonzalez; Assistant referees: Anthony Tribotti; Kevin Allen; Fourth official: Andrew Halley

== Statistics ==
=== Goalscorers ===
2 Goals

- Sabrina Bryan – Hofstra
- Laura Ortega – Charleston
- Lucy Porter – Hofstra

1 Goal

- Raymara Barreto – Charleston
- Maddie Brill-Edwards – Charleston
- Haley Crawford – James Madison
- Stephanie Hendrie – James Madison
- Kiera Hennessy – Drexel
- Morgan Rees – Drexel

== All-Tournament team ==
Player	Team
Madeline Anderson	Hofstra (MVP)
Sabrina Bryan	Hofstra
Kelly Gerdes	Hofstra
Lucy Porter	Hofstra
Haley Crawford	James Madison
Ginger Deel	James Madison
Sarah Gordon	James Madison
Raymara Barreto	Charleston
Laura Ortega	Charleston
Eve Goulet	Northeastern
Mikenna McManus	Northeastern

== See also ==
- Colonial Athletic Association
- 2018 CAA Men's Soccer Tournament
