= 2016 CAA women's soccer tournament =

- Classification: Division I
- Teams: 6
- Matches: 5
- Site: Parsons Field; Brookline, Massachusetts (Semifinals & Final)
- Champions: Northeastern (4th title)
- Winning coach: Ashley Phillips (1st title)

2016 Colonial Athletic Association women's soccer standings
	Conf.						Overall
Team	W		L		T	PCT	W		L		T	PCT
Northeastern ‍†‍‡‍^{y}	7	–	2	–	0	.778	14	–	7	–	1	.659
Drexel ‍‍‍	4	–	2	–	3	.611	9	–	7	–	4	.550
James Madison ‍‍‍	5	–	4	–	0	.556	9	–	11	–	0	.450
UNC Wilmington ‍‍‍	4	–	3	–	2	.556	10	–	5	–	4	.632
William & Mary ‍‍‍	4	–	4	–	1	.500	10	–	8	–	2	.550
Charleston ‍‍‍	3	–	3	–	3	.500	10	–	7	–	3	.575
Hofstra ‍‍‍	4	–	5	–	0	.444	10	–	7	–	1	.583
Delaware ‍‍‍	3	–	5	–	1	.389	4	–	13	–	1	.250
Towson ‍‍‍	3	–	6	–	0	.333	6	–	12	–	1	.342
Elon ‍‍‍	2	–	5	–	2	.333	7	–	9	–	3	.447
† – Conference champion ‡ – 2016 CAA Tournament champion y – Invited to the NCAA tournament As of 2016-11-17; Rankings from NSCAA

The 2016 CAA women's soccer tournament is the postseason women's soccer tournament for the Colonial Athletic Association held from October 30 to November 6, 2016. The five match tournament was held at campus sites, with the semifinals and final held at Parsons Field in Brookline, Massachusetts. The six team single-elimination tournament consisted of three rounds based on seeding from regular season conference play. The James Madison Dukes were the defending tournament champions after defeating the William & Mary Tribe in the championship match.

== Bracket ==
First round Sunday, Oct. 30
3	James Madison	1
6	Charleston	0
4	UNC Wilmington	2 (4)
5	William & Mary	2 (5)

Semifinals; Friday, Nov. 4
2	Drexel	2
3	James Madison	0
1	Northeastern	3
5	William & Mary	0

Final; Sunday, Nov. 6
2	Drexel	0
1	Northeastern	3

== Schedule ==
=== First round ===
October 30, 2016	#3 James Madison	1–0	#6 Charleston	Harrisonburg, Virginia
1:00 p.m. EST	Colleen Gawkins 70'	Report		Stadium: Sentara Park; Referee: Michael Schatzel

October 30, 2016	#4 UNC Wilmington	2–2 (a.e.t.) (4–5 p)	#5 William & Mary	Wilmington, North Carolina
2:00 p.m. EST	Brittany Matsinger 29'; Callie McClain 50'	Report	Sarah Segan 18'; Elysse Branton 83'	Stadium: UNCW Soccer Stadium; Referee: Brian Bozard
	Penalties
	Serenity Waters (penalty missed); Brittany Cline (penalty scored); Madison Melnick (penalty scored); Callie McClain (penalty scored); Savannah Andrews (penalty scored); Baley Edwards (penalty missed)		(penalty scored) Haley Kavanaugh; (penalty scored) Clara Logsdon; (penalty scored) Rachel Moore; (penalty missed) Elysse Branton; (penalty scored) Arundel Miguelez; (penalty scored) Charlotte Hyland

=== Semi-finals ===
November 4, 2016	#2 Drexel	2–0	#3 James Madison	Brookline, Massachusetts
2:00 p.m. EST	Kiera Hennessy 30'; Shaelyn McCarty 43'	Report		Stadium: Parsons Field; Referee: James B. Triplett

November 4, 2016	#1 Northeastern	3–0	#5 William & Mary	Brookline, Massachusetts
5:30 p.m. EST	Hannah Rosenblatt 14'; Eve Goulet 30'; Valent Soares Gache 63'	Report		Stadium: Parsons Field; Referee: Michael Correia

=== Final ===
November 6, 2016	#1 Northeastern	3–0	#2 Drexel	Brookline, Massachusetts
2:30 p.m. EST	Hannah Rosenblatt 23'; Nicole Gorman 57'; Carina Deandreis 70'	Report		Stadium: Parsons Field; Referee: Neil Barbulescu
