= 2024 CAA women's soccer tournament =

- Classification: Division I
- Teams: 6
- Matches: 5
- Attendance: 1,510
- Site: Campus Sites, Hosted by Higher Seed
- Champions: Stony Brook (1st title)
- Winning coach: Tobias Bischof (1st title)
- MVP: Linn Beck (Stony Brook)
- Broadcast: FloFC

2024 Coastal Athletic Association women's soccer standings
	Conf.						Overall
Team	W		L		T	PCT	W		L		T	PCT
Monmouth ‍†‍‍	7	–	1	–	2	.800	12	–	3	–	5	.725
Stony Brook ‍†‍‡‍^{y}	7	–	1	–	2	.800	14	–	4	–	3	.738
Elon ‍‍‍	7	–	3	–	0	.700	13	–	4	–	1	.750
Hofstra ‍‍‍	5	–	3	–	2	.600	8	–	5	–	6	.579
Delaware ‍‍‍	4	–	2	–	4	.600	6	–	7	–	6	.474
Charleston ‍‍‍	4	–	2	–	4	.600	11	–	4	–	5	.675
Towson ‍‍‍	4	–	2	–	4	.600	6	–	4	–	9	.553
Campbell ‍‍‍	4	–	6	–	0	.400	6	–	9	–	3	.417
Northeastern ‍‍‍	2	–	4	–	4	.400	2	–	9	–	7	.306
William & Mary ‍‍‍	3	–	7	–	0	.300	8	–	10	–	0	.444
UNC Wilmington ‍‍‍	2	–	5	–	3	.350	4	–	9	–	5	.361
Drexel ‍‍‍	2	–	5	–	3	.350	4	–	9	–	4	.353
Hampton ‍‍‍	0	–	10	–	0	.000	3	–	14	–	1	.194
† – Conference champion ‡ – 2024 CAA Tournament champion y – Invited to the NCAA Tournament; As of December 10, 2024; Rankings from United Soccer Coaches Poll; Source: Coastal Athletic Association

The 2024 CAA women's soccer tournament was the postseason women's soccer tournament for the Coastal Athletic Association held from October 31 through November 9, 2024. The First Round and Semifinals of the tournament were hosted by the first and second seed and the final was hosted by the highest remaining seed. The six-team single-elimination tournament consisted of three rounds based on seeding from regular season conference play. The defending champions were the Towson, who were unable to defend their title, after not qualifying for the tournament. They finished in a three-way tie for fifth in the regular season standings, but lost the tiebreakers to not qualify for the tournament. Stony Brook won the tournament by defeating Monmouth in the Final, 2–1. The conference tournament title was the first overall for the Stony Brook women's soccer program and the first for head coach Tobias Bischof. Stony Brook had previously won three America East conference tournament titles, but this was their first CAA title after moving to the conference in 2022. As tournament champions, Stony Brook earned the CAA's automatic berth into the 2024 NCAA Division I women's soccer tournament.

== Seeding ==
The top six teams in the Coastal Athletic Association regular season standings earned a spot in the tournament and teams were seeded by regular season conference record. A tiebreaker was required to determine the first and second seeds as Monmouth and Stony Brook tied for first place with 7–1–2 conference records. The two teams tied their regular season matchup 2–2. Monmouth earned the first seed by virtue of their win over Hofstra. There was a three-way tie for fifth place between Charleston, Delaware, and Towson, as all teams finished 4–2–4. Delaware earned the fifth seed by way of record against highest ranking common opponent, Hofstra. Delaware won their regular season meeting 2–1 while the other two teams lost. Charleston earned the sixth, and final seed in the tournament by virtue of a better goal differential in league games (+5) while Towson had a +2 goal difference. Towson finished seventh and did not qualify for the tournament.

Seed	School	Conference Record	Points
1	Monmouth	7–1–2	23
2	Stony Brook	7–1–2	23
3	Elon	7–3–0	21
4	Hofstra	5–3–2	17
5	Delaware	4–2–4	16
6	Charleston	4–2–4	16

== Bracket ==
Quarterfinals; October 31
4	Hofstra (a.e.t.)	1
5	Delaware	0
3	Elon	2
6	Charleston	1

Semifinals; November 3
1	Monmouth	4
4	Hofstra	2
2	Stony Brook	2
3	Elon	1

Championship; November 9
1	Monmouth	1
2	Stony Brook	2

== Schedule ==
=== First Round ===
October 31, 2024	#3 Elon	2–1	#6 Charleston	Stony Brook, NY
4:00 EDT	Ashlee Brehio 62'; Grace Gelhaus 86'	Report	72' Caroline Fowlkes	Stadium: LaValle Stadium; Attendance: 118; Referee: Gregory DeMello; Assistant referees: Ricardo Barreto; Hector Rueda; Fourth official: Stephen Cope

October 31, 2024	#4 Hofstra	1–0 (a.e.t.)	#5 Delaware	West Long Branch, NJ
4:00 EDT	Millie Davies 93'	Report		Stadium: Hesse Field; Attendance: 109; Referee: Tony Russo; Assistant referees: Sami Card; Joseph Knoff; Fourth official: Erik Backstrom

=== Semifinals ===
November 3, 2024	#1 Monmouth	4–2	#4 Hofstra	West Long Branch, NJ
1:00 p.m. EST	Summer Reimet 11', 44'; Chloe Ferreira (yellow card) 35'; Loren Gehret 62'; Liza Suydam 90'	Report	(yellow card) 55', (goal) 82' Millie Davies; (yellow card) 62' Team; (yellow card) 63' Dagný Rún Pétursdóttir; 67' Louise Hayden; (yellow card) 87' Ellie Gough	Stadium: Hesse Field; Attendance: 290; Referee: Mike DeFelice; Assistant referees: Conor McCloskey; Max Moya; Fourth official: Michael McBride

November 3, 2024	#2 Stony Brook	2–1	#3 Elon	Stony Brook, NY
1:00 p.m. EST	Reilly Rich 30' (pen.); Linn Beck 40'; Luciana Setteducate (yellow card) 77'	Report	(yellow card) 53' Jordan Green; (yellow card) 63' Katie Lowe; (yellow card) 78' Ashlee Brehio; 88' Lauren McCauley	Stadium: LaValle Stadium; Attendance: 373; Referee: Leah Hayes; Assistant referees: Sami Card; Maria Gigante; Fourth official: Sean Lyons

=== Final ===
November 9, 2024	#1 Monmouth	1–2	#2 Stony Brook	West Long Branch, NJ
7:00 p.m. EST	Summer Reimet 79'	Report	(yellow card) 24' Kerry Pearson; 32' Luciana Setteducate; 55' Linn Beck	Stadium: Hesse Field; Attendance: 620; Referee: Greg DeMello; Assistant referees: Erik Backstrom; Kevin Rodrigo; Fourth official: Brendan Quinn

== Statistics ==
=== Goalscorers ===
There were 16 goals scored in 5 matches, for an average of 3.2 goals per match (as of November 9, 2024).

3 goals

- Summer Reimet – Monmouth

2 goals

- Linn Beck – Stony Brook
- Millie Davies – Hofstra

1 goal

- Ashlee Brehio – Elon
- Caroline Fowlkes – Charleston
- Loren Gehret – Monmouth
- Grace Gelhaus – Elon
- Louise Hayden – Hofstra
- Lauren McCauley – Elon
- Reilly Rich – Stony Brook
- Luciana Setteducate – Stony Brook
- Liza Suydam – Monmouth

== All-Tournament team ==
Player	Team
Ashlee Brehio	Elon
Grace Gelhaus	Elon
Millie Davies	Hofstra
Louise Hayden	Hofstra
Gabby Allen	Monmouth
Cassie Coster	Monmouth
Maddison Perna	Monmouth
**Linn Beck**	Stony Brook
Kerry Pearson	Stony Brook
Reilly Rich	Stony Brook
Luciana Setteducate	Stony Brook

MVP in bold
