= Chelsea Domond =

Haitian footballer (born 1999)

Personal information
- Full name: Chelsea Amanda Domond
- Date of birth: 19 December 1999 (age 26)
- Place of birth: Stamford, Connecticut, USA
- Height: 1.65 m (5 ft 5 in)
- Position: Right winger

Team information
- Current team: Panathinaikos

College career
Years	Team	Apps	(Gls)
2017–2021	Northeastern Huskies	69	(17)
2021–2022	Syracuse Orange	17	(5)

Senior career*
Years	Team	Apps	(Gls)
2023–2024	Panathinaikos	20	(8)
2024–2025	Olympique Marseille	7	(1)
2025–2026	Guingamp	15	(3)
2026–	Panathinaikos	1	(1)

International career^{‡}
2025–	Haiti	6	(1)
- * Club domestic league appearances and goals as of 20 September 2026 ‡ National team caps and goals as of 6 August 2025

Chelsea Amanda Domond (born 19 December 1999) is a professional footballer who plays as a forward for the Greek club Panathinaikos. She also previously played for Marseille, Guingamp as well as the Northeastern Huskies and Syracuse Orange teams. Born in the United States, she has made six appearances for the Haiti national team.

== Early life and education ==
Chelsea Amanda Domond was born on 19 December 1999 in Stamford, Connecticut to Clarita and Gerald Domond. She has one sister. Her first experience of soccer was when aged 4, her father enrolled her into Stamford house league soccer. She attended Westhill High School and played on the school's football team. Domond scored over 70 goals for the team, and was named as an All-State performer twice and an All-League honoree three times while at the school. She was also a recipient of the National Soccer Coaches Association of America (NSCAA) All-East Region in addition to being a U.S. Youth Soccer Olympic Development Program (ODP) All-Star in 2015, and a Hearst Connecticut Media All-Star the following year. During the school soccer off-season, Domond played on teams including Greenwich Spirit, Stamford Hurricanes and Yankee United.

Domond attended Northeastern University, where she earned an undergraduate degree in speech pathology and psychology, and played for their soccer team, the Northeastern Huskies. She played for the Huskies for four years, making 69 appearances with 17 goals and 9 assists. In 2021, Domond transferred to Syracuse University as part of a scholarship agreement to play for the Syracuse Orange women's soccer team while studying for her master's degree in speech-language pathology. She played on the team for two seasons.

== Club career ==
After six years of college soccer, Chelsea Domond signed her first professional contract with Greek club Panathinaikos in the summer of 2023. She was one of the key players in the club's third-place finish during its first season in the Greek A Division, scoring 8 goals in 20 appearances. Her performances earned her a place in the league's Team of the Season at the 2024 PSAPP awards.

On 26 July 2024, she transferred to French club Olympique Marseille, competing in the Seconde Ligue. She made her debut on 19 January 2025 against Saint-Malo and went on to score one goal in seven appearances. Marseille finished first in the league, securing promotion to the Première Ligue. On 31 October 2025, Domond joined Guingamp on loan, but a few days later she made the deal permanent after terminating her contract with Marseille. She scored four goals in 16 appearances. Guingamp finished last in the Seconde Ligue and were relegated at the end of the season.

On 4 August 2026, she returned to Panathinaikos.

== International career ==
Although born in the United States, Domond plays internationally for the Haiti national team. She made her debut for the team in 2025, and has currently appeared in six games, scoring one goal.

== Career statistics ==
As of 5 August 2026

=== College ===
Team	Season	NCAA Regular Season			Conference Tournament		NCAA Tournament		Total	
Team	Season	Division	Apps	Goals	Apps	Goals	Apps	Goals	Apps	Goals
Northeastern Huskies	2017	Div. I	19	3	3	0	—		22	3
Northeastern Huskies	2018	Div. I	18	3	1	0	—		19	3
Northeastern Huskies	2019	Div. I	16	7	1	0	—		17	7
Northeastern Huskies	2020	Div. I	10	3	1	1	—		11	4
Northeastern Huskies	Total		63	16	6	1	—		69	17
Syracuse Orange	2021	Div. I	—		—		—		0	0
Syracuse Orange	2022	Div. I	17	5	—		—		17	5
Syracuse Orange	Total		17	5	—		—		17	5
Career Total			80	21	6	1	—		86	22

=== Club ===
Appearances and goals by club, season and competition
Club	Season	League			National Cup		League Cup		Continental		Total	
Club	Season	Division	Apps	Goals	Apps	Goals	Apps	Goals	Apps	Goals	Apps	Goals
Panathinaikos	2023–24	Greek A Division	20	8	1	0	—		—		21	8
Olympique Marseille	2024–25	Seconde Ligue	6	1	1	0	—		—		7	1
Guingamp	2025–26	Seconde Ligue	15	3	—		1	1	—		16	4
Panathinaikos	2026–27	Greek A Division					—		—			
Career total			41	12	2	0	1	1	—		44	13

== Honours ==
=== Club ===
Olympique Marseille

- Seconde Ligue: 2024–25

=== Individual ===
- All-CAA Rookie Team: 2017
- All-CAA Third Team: 2018
- All-CAA Second Team: 2019
- NSCAA All-East Region Third Team: 2019
- All-CAA First Team: 2020
- PSAPP Team of the Season: 2023–24
