= Mikenna McManus =

American soccer player (born 1999)

Personal information
- Date of birth: July 26, 1999 (age 27)
- Height: 5 ft 6 in (1.68 m)
- Positions: Center back; left back

Youth career
- West Coast FC

College career
Years	Team	Apps	(Gls)
2017–2021	Northeastern Huskies	91	(8)

Senior career*
Years	Team	Apps	(Gls)
2022	Chicago Red Stars	1	(0)
2023	Þróttur Reykjavík	23	(1)
- * Club domestic league appearances and goals as of May 31, 2025

Mikenna McManus (born July 26, 1999) is an American former professional soccer player who played as a defender. She played college soccer for the Northeastern Huskies before playing professionally for the Chicago Red Stars of the National Women's Soccer League (NWSL) and Þróttur Reykjavík of the Besta deild kvenna.

== Early life ==
A native of Lake Forest, California, McManus attended El Toro High School and earned three varsity letters with its soccer team. In 2016, she helped El Toro win the Sea View League championship and was subsequently named to the All-League First Team. She also played club soccer for West Coast FC.

== College career ==
McManus played five seasons with the Northeastern Huskies. She made an immediate impact in her freshman year, starting in all but one of the 22 games she played in. The following season, she was named to the All-CAA second team after helping the Huskies' backline to 7 shutouts on the year. She had started all 22 of Northeastern's matches, leading the team in minutes played. On August 30, 2018, she tallied three assists in a single match as the Huskies beat Boston College in conference play.

As a junior, McManus was named third-team All-CAA. In late September 2019, she was recognized as the CAA's Defensive Player of the Week after scoring her first collegiate goal versus Towson and notching two assists as well. She went on to score three more goals over the course of the season, setting a career high for herself. Two of her four goals combined for a brace in a 4–0 victory over Elon. The next NCAA season was postponed and shortened due to the COVID-19 pandemic, but McManus still managed to find success, including her first All-CAA first team award.

In her fifth year, McManus continued to be effective on both sides of the field, leading her team with 4 goals and 3 assists. Northeastern advanced to the finals of the 2021 CAA tournament, but they were beaten by Hofstra in the championship match. McManus was named to the All-Tournament team for her performances.

== Club career ==
McManus registered for the 2022 NWSL Draft, but went undrafted. However, she received an invite to the Chicago Red Stars' preseason training camp after sending the club her college highlight reel. After training with the Stars for several months, McManus made the team's final roster. She made her professional debut on March 30, 2022, in an NWSL Challenge Cup draw with Racing Louisville FC. On July 2, she played in her first regular season game, coming on as a late substitute in a 3–0 win over NJ/NY Gotham FC. It would be her only NWSL appearance as she was waived at the end of the season by the Red Stars.

On March 11, 2023, McManus relocated to Iceland and signed with Þróttur Reykjavík of the Besta deild kvenna. She played 23 league games in her single season with the club and also had 2 appearances in the Icelandic Women's Football Cup. In Reykjavík's final game of the year, McManus scored her first professional goal to help seize third place from opponents Stjarnan.

== International career ==
McManus has been invited to train with the United States under-18 team.

== Style of play ==
McManus is capable of playing at center back, left back, and in positions higher up the field. She is comfortable in possession and can operate as a playmaker from the backline. While naturally right-footed, she is equally capable in using her left foot and uses her ambidexterity to serve up corner kicks in multiple different ways.

== Career statistics ==
=== Club ===
As of May 31, 2025

Appearances and goals by club, season and competition
Club	Season	League			Cup (Note: Includes the NWSL Challenge Cup and Icelandic Women's Football Cup)		Playoffs (Note: Includes NWSL Playoffs)		Total	
Club	Season	Division	Apps	Goals	Apps	Goals	Apps	Goals	Apps	Goals
Chicago Red Stars	2022	NWSL	1	0	1	0	0	0	2	0
Þróttur Reykjavík	2023	Besta deild kvenna	23	1	2	0	—		25	1
Career total			24	1	3	0	0	0	27	1
