= 2017 CAA men's soccer tournament =

- Classification: Division I
- Teams: 6
- Matches: 5
- Quarterfinals site: Higher seeds
- Semifinals site: Sentara Park; Harrisonburg, Virginia
- Finals site: Sentara Park; Harrisonburg, Virginia
- Champions: William & Mary (8th title)
- Winning coach: Chris Norris (2nd title)
- MVP: Antonio Bustamante (William & Mary)
- Broadcast: CAA.tv

2017 Colonial Athletic Association men's soccer standings
	Conf.					Overall
Team	W		L		T	W		L		T
James Madison	5	–	1	–	2	9	–	7	–	3
UNC Wilmington +	5	–	3	–	0	12	–	8	–	0
Charleston	3	–	1	–	4	8	–	6	–	4
Hofstra	3	–	1	–	4	6	–	6	–	6
William & Mary ‡	3	–	2	–	3	11	–	5	–	5
Elon	3	–	2	–	3	7	–	5	–	6
Delaware	2	–	4	–	2	5	–	7	–	4
Northeastern	1	–	6	–	1	3	–	12	–	3
Drexel	1	–	6	–	1	2	–	14	–	1
‡ – 2017 CAA Tournament champion + – Invited to the 2017 NCAA Division I Men's Soccer Championship; As of November 19, 2017; Rankings from United Soccer Coaches

The 2017 CAA men's soccer tournament, was the 35th edition of the tournament. It determined the Colonial Athletic Association's automatic berth into the 2017 NCAA Division I Men's Soccer Championship.

William & Mary won the CAA title for a record eighth time. The Tribe defeated UNC Wilmington 4–2 in the championship match. Tribe striker, Antonio Bustamante won the CAA Tournament MVP award.

== Seeding ==
The top six programs qualified for the CAA Tournament. The top two seeds, being the regular season champion and runner-up earned a bye to the semifinals of the tournament.

No.	School	W	L	T	PCT.	Pts.
1	James Madison	5	1	2	.750	17
2	UNCW	5	3	0	.625	15
3	Charleston	3	1	4	.625	13
4	Hofstra	3	1	4	.625	13
5	William & Mary	3	2	3	.563	12
6	Elon	3	2	3	.563	12

== Bracket ==
Quarterfinals; Saturday, November 4
4	Hofstra	1
5	William & Mary	2
3	Charleston	2
6	Elon	1

Semifinals; Friday, November 10
1	James Madison	0
5	William & Mary	1
2	UNCW (OT)	2
3	Charleston	1

Final; Sunday, November 12
5	William & Mary	4
2	UNCW	2

== Results ==
=== Quarterfinals ===
November 4
7:00 PM EST

^{No. 3} Charleston Cougars	2–1	^{No. 6} Elon Phoenix
Archer 28', 66'	Report	Agu 23'

CofC Soccer Stadium at Patriot's Point, Mount Pleasant, South Carolina
Attendance: 332
Referee: Derek Allison

November 4
7:00 PM EST

^{No. 4} Hofstra Pride	1–4	^{No. 5} William & Mary Tribe
Ramsay 27'	Report	Bustamante 6', 36', 54', 78'

HU Soccer Stadium, Hempstead, New York
Attendance: 329
Referee: Mike Godi

=== Semifinals ===
November 10
4:00 PM EST

^{No. 2} UNCW Seahawks	2–1 (a.e.t.)	^{No. 3} Charleston Cougars
Moncada 61'; Elveroth 100'	Report	Heffron 21'

Sentara Park, Harrisonburg, Virginia
Attendance: 125
Referee: Mike Stutt

November 10
7:00 PM EST

^{No. 1} James Madison Dukes	0–1	^{No. 5} William & Mary Tribe
	Report	Trott 25'

Sentara Park, Harrisonburg, Virginia
Attendance: 400
Referee: Bill Dittmar

=== Final ===
November 12
1:00 PM EST

^{No. 2} UNCW Seahawks	2–4	^{No. 5} William & Mary Tribe
Moncada 25'; Gianfortone 90'	Report	Ngoh 54'; Bustamante 66', 76', 78'

Sentara Park, Harrisonburg, Virginia
Attendance: 200
Referee: Peter Dhima

== Statistics ==
=== Top goalscorers ===
Rank	Player	College	Goals
1	(United States) Antonio Bustamante	William & Mary	4
2	(Trinidad and Tobago) Leland Archer	Charleston	2
3	(United States) Elijah Agu	Elon	1
3	(New Zealand) Oscar Ramsay	Hofstra	1

== All-Tournament team ==
- Antonio Bustamante (Most Outstanding Performer)
- Remi Frost, William & Mary
- Ryder Bell, William & Mary
- Riley Spain, William & Mary
- Julio Moncada, UNCW
- Phillip Goodrum, UNCW
- Emil Elveroth, UNCW
- TJ Bush, James Madison
- Yannick Franz, James Madison
- Leland Archer, Charleston
- Kevin Shields, Charleston

== See also ==
- 2017 CAA Women's Soccer Tournament
