= Lucy Shepherd =

English soccer player (born 1998)

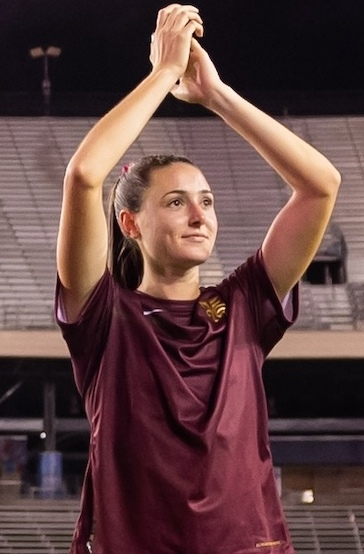
- Shepherd with Dallas Trinity in 2024

Personal information
- Date of birth: 14 November 1998 (age 27)
- Place of birth: Worcestershire, England
- Height: 5 ft 9 in (1.75 m)
- Position: Forward

Team information
- Current team: Portsmouth
- Number: 12

Youth career
- 2009–2017: Aston Villa

College career
| Years | Team | Apps | (Gls) |
| 2017–2021 | Hofstra Pride | 96 | (25) |

Senior career*
| Years | Team | Apps | (Gls) |
| 2022–2023 | London City Lionesses | 16 | (1) |
| 2023–2024 | Blackburn Rovers | 22 | (4) |
| 2024–2025 | Dallas Trinity | 21 | (1) |
| 2026– | Portsmouth | 0 | (0) |

International career
| 2014 | England U17 | 0 | (0) |
| 2016 | England U19 | 1 | (1) |
- * Club domestic league appearances and goals as of 02:09, 18 January 2026 (UTC)

Lucy Shepherd (born 14 November 1998) is an English professional football player who plays as a forward for Portsmouth. She played college soccer for Hofstra Pride. She has previously played for the London City Lionesses and Blackburn Rovers.

== Early life ==
Shepherd began her football career on boys' teams, where she was frequently the only girl. At age 12, a rule prohibiting girls from playing on boys' teams came into effect. During one of her last matches with the boys' team, a scout noticed her that ending up leading to her recruitment into Aston Villa's youth team.

Shepherd spent eight years with Aston Villa' and became the first Villa player to score in an FA Youth Cup final. She also played for the first team at Aston Villa for two years.

== College career ==
Shepherd joined the Hofstra Pride in 2017, a year after the team finished with a 4–5 record in the Colonial Athletic Association (now the Coastal Athletic Association; CAA). Over the next four seasons, Shepherd helped lead Hofstra to four consecutive CAA conference titles as well as helping Hofstra advance to the second round of the NCAA Women's Division I Tournament on three occasions.

== Club career ==
Shepherd was selected 23rd overall by the Washington Spirit in the 2022 NWSL Draft, becoming the second player in Hofstra's history to be drafted. She participated in Washington's preseason camp.

=== London City Lionesses, 2022–2023 ===
It was announced on 7 July 2022 that Shepherd joined the London City Lionesses on a free transfer. She made her debut on 21 August 2022 coming on as a substitute against Crystal Palace in the 56th minute for Karin Muya. She scored her first club goal against Crystal Palace on 15 January 2023. The Lionesses finished 3rd in the 2022–23 Women's Championship league table earning 45 points only 3 points behind league winners Bristol City.

=== Blackburn Rovers, 2023–2024 ===
On 22 August 2023, Shepherd joined Blackburn Rovers on a free transfer. Four days after signing with Blackburn, she made her club debut against Birmingham City. She scored her first goal in a Women's FA Cup match against Darwen FC on 10 December 2023. Two months later, she netted her first league goal for Blackburn in a 1–0 away victory against London City Lionesses, her former club. Shepherd was awarded Player of the Year.

=== Dallas Trinity FC, 2024–present ===
On 1 July 2024, Shepherd joined Dallas Trinity FC in preparation for the inaugural USL Super League season. She made her club debut in friendly against Barcelona on 30 August 2024. She made her league debut on 7 September 2024 against DC Power FC, coming in the 80th minute for Chioma Ubogagu. She got her first assist for Dallas six days later against Lexington. Shepherd scored her first club goal on 9 March 2025 against Brooklyn FC in a 6–0 home win at the Cotton Bowl.

== International career ==
=== Youth ===
Shepherd has represented England at the U17 and U19 levels. Shepherd was called up by head coach Mo Marley to join the England women's national under-19 team on 14 July 2016 for a friendly against United States. Later in October, Shepherd was called up again to participate in a friendly tournament hosted by Northern Ireland in preparation for the European Championship, which England won. Shepherd scored against the hosts in the second game of the tournament in a 5–0 victory.

== Personal life ==
Shepherd attended Alcester Grammar School as a child. She graduated with a Bachelors degree in finance from Hofstra.

== Career statistics ==
=== College ===
| College | Regular Season | | | | CAA Tournament | | NCAA Tournament | | Total | |
| College | Conference | Season | Apps | Goals | Apps | Goals | Apps | Goals | Apps | Goals |
|---|---|---|---|---|---|---|---|---|---|---|
| Hofstra Pride | CAA | 2017 | 17 | 3 | 2 | 0 | 1 | 0 | 20 | 3 |
| Hofstra Pride | CAA | 2018 | 18 | 3 | 3 | 0 | 2 | 1 | 23 | 4 |
| Hofstra Pride | CAA | 2019 | 18 | 5 | 2 | 1 | 2 | 0 | 22 | 6 |
| Hofstra Pride | CAA | 2020 | 9 | 4 | — | | — | | 9 | 4 |
| Hofstra Pride | CAA | 2021 | 18 | 8 | 2 | 2 | 2 | 0 | 22 | 8 |
| Career total | | | 80 | 21 | 9 | 3 | 7 | 1 | 96 | 25 |

=== Club ===
As of 12 October 2025

| Club | Season | League | | | National Cup (Note: Includes Women's FA Cup and FA Women's League Cup) | | Leagues Cup | | Total | |
| Club | Season | Division | Apps | Goals | Apps | Goals | Apps | Goals | Apps | Goals |
|---|---|---|---|---|---|---|---|---|---|---|
| Aston Villa | 2016 | Women's Championship | — | | — | | — | | 0 | 0 |
| Aston Villa | 2017 | Women's Championship | — | | — | | — | | 0 | 0 |
| London City Lionesses | 2022–23 | Women's Championship | 16 | 1 | 4 | 0 | — | | 20 | 1 |
| Blackburn Rovers W.F.C. | 2023–24 | Women's Championship | 22 | 4 | 6 | 3 | — | | 28 | 7 |
| Dallas Trinity FC | 2024–25 | USL Super League | 17 | 1 | — | | 1 (Note: Includes appearances in USL Super League playoffs) | 0 | 18 | 1 |
| Dallas Trinity FC | 2025–26 | USL Super League | 3 | 0 | — | | 0 | 0 | 3 | 0 |
| Career total | | | 58 | 6 | 10 | 3 | 1 | 0 | 68 | 9 |
