= Julija Kovaliova =

Lithuanian gymnast (born 1980)

- Full name: Julija Kovaliova
- Born: 20 December 1980 (age 45) Vilnius, Lithuanian SSR, Soviet Union
- Height: 5 ft 2 in (157 cm)

Gymnastics career
- Discipline: Women's artistic gymnastics
- Country represented: Lithuania
- College team: Towson Tigers (2002–2005)

Julija Kovaliova (born 20 December 1980) is a Lithuanian gymnast. She competed at the 2000 Summer Olympics.
