= UNCW Soccer Stadium =

Soccer stadium in Wilmington, North Carolina

Coordinates: 34°13′21″N 77°52′35″W

- Interactive map of UNCW Soccer Stadium
- Address: Wilmington, NC; United States
- Owner: UNCW
- Operator: UNCW Athletics
- Capacity: 3,000
- Type: Stadium
- Surface: Grass
- Current use: Soccer

Tenants
- UNC Wilmington Seahawks teams: men's and women's soccer; CAA women's soccer tournament (1996)

Website
- uncwsports.com/uncw-soccer-stadium

UNCW Soccer Stadium is a 3,000-capacity soccer-specific stadium located in Wilmington, North Carolina. The stadium is home to the University of North Carolina Wilmington Seahawks men's and women's soccer teams.

== History ==
UNCW Soccer Stadium hosted the 1996 CAA men's and women's soccer tournaments, as well as the semifinals of the 2008 and 2009 men's CAA tournament.

=== NCAA tournament ===
The stadium has hosted three UNCW men's soccer matches at the NCAA Division I men's soccer tournament:

| Date | Tourn. | Rival | Score | Ref. |
|---|---|---|---|---|
| 20 Nov | 2014 | Bucknell | 2–0 | |
| 16 Nov | 2017 | Presbyterian | 1–0 | |
| 15 Nov | 2018 | Furman | 0–0 (a.e.t.) (3–5 p) | |

=== CAA tournament ===
The stadium was the venue for the 1996 CAA women's soccer tournament final, where William & Mary defeated George Mason to win their first CAA tournament title.

| Year | Event | Team 1 | Score | Team 2 | Ref. |
|---|---|---|---|---|---|
| 1997 | CAA women's tournament final | William & Mary | 2–0 | George Mason | |

=== 2020 NCAA Tournament ===
UNCW Soccer Stadium was one of the host sites for the 2020 men's and women's NCAA soccer tournaments.
