= Hofstra University Soccer Stadium =

Stadium in Hempstead, New York

Captains Field
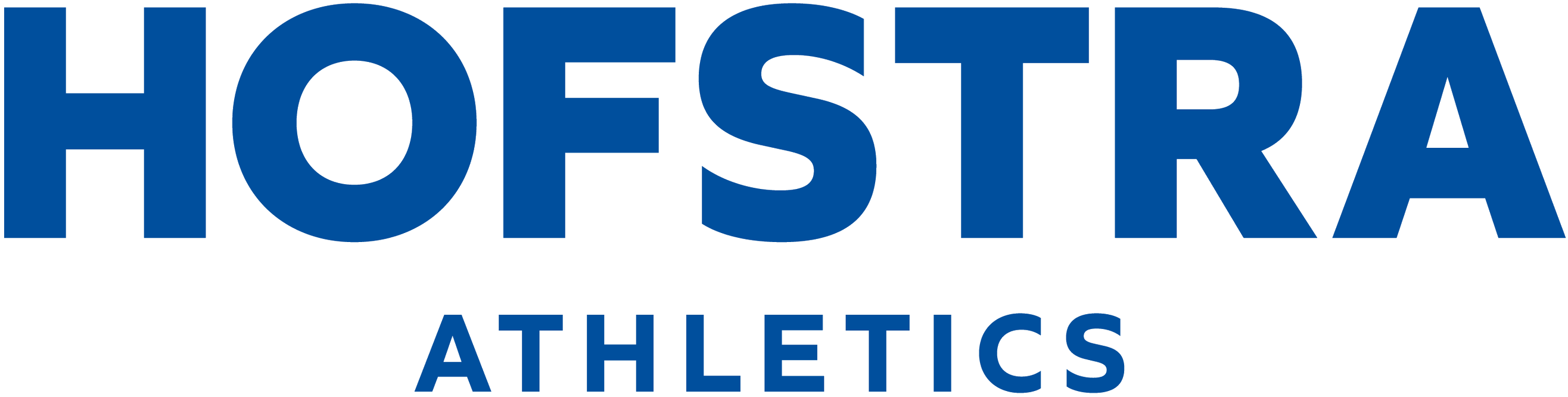
- Interactive map of Captains Field
- Former names: Hofstra Soccer Stadium (2003–2024)
- Location: 245 Hofstra Northern Blvd. Hempstead, New York 11549
- Coordinates: 40°43′6.549″N 73°35′55.1898″W
- Owner: Hofstra University
- Operator: Hofstra Univ. Athletics
- Capacity: 1,600
- Surface: FieldTurf
- Field size: 120 x 74 yards

Construction
- Built: 2003
- Opened: 2003; 23 years ago

Tenants
- Hofstra Pride (NCAA) teams: men's and women's soccer (2003–present); Professional teams: Long Island Rough Riders (USL2); New Amsterdam FC (NISA)

Website
- gohofstra.com/hofstra-soccer-stadium

Captains Field (previously Hofstra Soccer Stadium), is a 1,600-seat soccer-specific stadium on the campus of Hofstra University in Hempstead, New York. It is part of the Hofstra University sports complex. First opened in 2003, it is the home field of the Hofstra Pride men's and women's college soccer teams. As of 2021, Hofstra University Soccer Stadium was also home to NISA club New Amsterdam FC.

The stadium has hosted the first round of the NCAA Division I Men's Soccer Tournament games in 2005, 2006 and 2015.

== See also ==
- James M. Shuart Stadium
