= Stony Brook Seawolves women's soccer =

American college women's soccer team

- Founded: 1985
- University: Stony Brook University
- Head coach: Tobias Bischof (2019–present season)
- Conference: CAA; NCAA Division I Division
- Location: Stony Brook, New York (state), US
- Stadium: LaValle Stadium (capacity: 8,300)
- Nickname: Seawolves
- Colors: Red, blue, and gray
Home	Away

NCAA tournament appearances
- 2012, 2017, 2019, 2020–21, 2024

Conference tournament championships
- 2012, 2017, 2019, 2024

Conference regular season championships
- 2012, 2013, 2017, 2018, 2019, 2024

Stony Brook Seawolves women’s soccer is the NCAA Division I women’s soccer program representing Stony Brook University in Stony Brook, New York. The Seawolves compete in the Coastal Athletic Association and play their home matches at LaValle Stadium.

== History ==
The Stony Brook women’s soccer program was established in 1985. In 2012, the Seawolves earned their first America East Conference Tournament title by defeating Hartford in the final and securing an automatic bid to the NCAA Tournament for the first time in program history.

Stony Brook continued to contend in the America East, winning the conference tournament again in 2017 by beating Vermont 2–1 in the championship match. In 2019 the Seawolves captured the America East Tournament championship with a 2–1 victory over Hartford, marking their third tournament title.

After joining the Coastal Athletic Association, Stony Brook captured **its first CAA regular season and tournament championships in 2024** by finishing atop the conference and then defeating Monmouth 2–1 in the CAA Championship game to earn an NCAA Tournament berth.

== Conference Championships ==
- America East Conference Regular Season: 2012, 2013, 2017, 2018, 2019
- America East Conference Tournament: 2012, 2017, 2019
- CAA Regular Season: 2024
- CAA Tournament: 2024

== NCAA Tournament Appearances ==
Year	Round	Opponent	Result
2012	First Round	Maryland	L 0–2
2017	First Round	Penn State	L 0–7
2019	First Round	Penn State	L 1–3
2020	First Round	Ohio State	L 5–1
2024	First Round	Penn State	L 1–8

== Current roster ==
The following table lists the Stony Brook Seawolves women’s soccer roster for the 2026 season.

Note: Flags indicate national team as defined under FIFA eligibility rules; some limited exceptions apply. Players may hold more than one non-FIFA nationality.

No.	Pos.	Nation	Player
0	GK	USA	Kennady Steinagel
1	GK	GER	Jona Hennings
2	D	USA	Abigail Roche
3	F	NOR	Hedvig Helling
5	D	USA	Taylor Steinagel
6	M	SWE	Juni Einarsson
7	F	GER	Emily Lemke
8	D	SUI	Lisa Muller
9	M	CAN	Maya Corbett
10	M	CAN	Annalisa Colangelo
12	F	FIN	Eela Oljemark
13	D	USA	Sophia Racioppi
14	D	USA	Emanuelly Ferreira

No.	Pos.	Nation	Player
15	M	USA	Jamie Keens
17	F	USA	Mia Grove
18	D	USA	Camryn Goodman
19	F	USA	Ashley Bell
20	M	USA	Allison George
21	D	USA	Samantha Guckian
23	D	USA	Eva Sprewell
24	GK	USA	Marissa Read
25	F	USA	Natalie Bala
26	F	USA	Leah Rifas
29	D/F	USA	Olivia Mazziotti
30	D/F	USA	Nya Riggs
31	M/F	USA	Addison Brys

== Coaching staff ==
Name	Position	Tenure
Tobias Bischof	Head coach	2019–present
Karim Diallo	Assistant Coach	2021–present
Sydney Blomquist	Assistant Coach	2026–present
Curtis Copenhaver	Volunteer Assistant Coach	2025–present

== Home stadium ==
Stony Brook plays its home matches at LaValle Stadium, a multi-purpose facility on the Stony Brook campus with a seating capacity of approximately 8,300 spectators.
