= Monmouth Hawks =

Intercollegiate sports teams of Monmouth University

- University: Monmouth University
- Conference: Coastal Athletic Association (primary); Northeast Conference (bowling)
- NCAA: Division I (FCS)
- Athletic director: Jeff Stapleton
- Location: West Long Branch, New Jersey
- Varsity teams: 24
- Football stadium: Kessler Stadium
- Basketball arena: OceanFirst Bank Center
- Baseball stadium: Monmouth Baseball Field
- Mascot: Shadow
- Nickname: Hawks
- Colors: Midnight blue and white
- Website: monmouthhawks.com
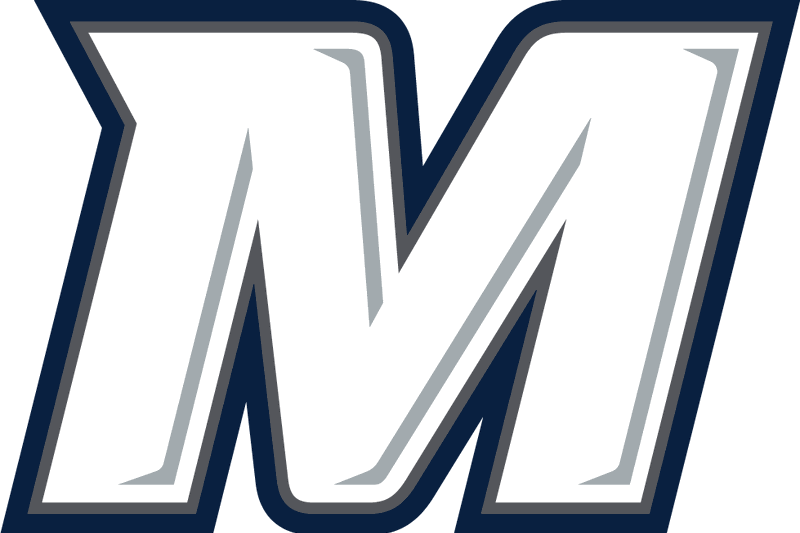

The Monmouth Hawks refer to the 23 sports teams representing Monmouth University in West Long Branch, New Jersey. The Hawks compete in the NCAA Division I and are members of the Coastal Athletic Association, joining on July 1, 2022. The football team became an FCS Independent for the 2013 season, and moved to the Big South Conference on July 1, 2014. The women's bowling program was a charter member of the Southland Bowling League, a single-sport conference formed in January 2015, but moved that sport to the Mid-Eastern Athletic Conference after the 2017–18 season, and returned to the Northeast Conference, in which Monmouth had been a full member from 1985 to 2013, as a single-sport member for 2024–25 and beyond.

On January 25, 2022, Monmouth announced it would leave the MAAC to join the Coastal Athletic Association, effective July 1, 2022. At that time, its football team left the Big South to join CAA Football, which is administered by the all-sports CAA but is legally a separate entity.

== Teams ==
Monmouth sponsors teams in ten men's and eleven women's NCAA sanctioned sports:

Men's sports	Women's sports
Baseball	Basketball
Basketball	Bowling (Note: Starting in 2024–25, bowling competes in the Northeast Conference.)
Cross country	Cross country
Football	Field hockey
Golf	Golf
Lacrosse	Lacrosse
Soccer	Rowing
Swimming	Soccer
Tennis	Softball
Track and field^{1}	Swimming
	Tennis
	Track and field^{1}
^{1} includes both indoor and outdoor
