= Parsons Field =

Stadium in Brookline, Massachusetts, US

Coordinates: 42°20′13″N 71°6′50″W

- Interactive map of Parsons Field
- Full name: Parsons Field and Friedman Diamond
- Address: Brookline, MA; United States
- Owner: Northeastern University
- Operator: Northeastern Univ. Athletics
- Capacity: 7,000
- Current use: Baseball; Football; Soccer; Lacrosse; Rugby

Construction
- Opened: 1933; 93 years ago

Tenants
- Northeastern Huskies (NCAA) teams: baseball; men's and women's soccer; men's and women's lacrosse; men's and women's rugby; High school teams; Brookline High School Warriors

Parsons Field and Friedman Diamond is a 7,000-seat multi-purpose stadium in Brookline, Massachusetts. It is home to the Northeastern University baseball, men's and women's soccer, men's and women's lacrosse, men's and women's rugby, as well as the Brookline High School Warriors football team. Additionally, the stadium was the home of the Northeastern Huskies football team until it was disbanded following the 2009 season. The capacity for baseball is 3,000. The facility opened in 1933.

Originally a public playground, Northeastern purchased the field (then known as Kent Street Field) from the YMCA's Huntington Prep School in 1930. In 1969, the University dedicated it to Edward S. Parsons, a former athlete, coach, and athletics director for the Huskies. The baseball diamond was named as the Friedman Diamond in 1988. In 1994, it hosted the America East Conference baseball tournament.

In its original configuration, the baseball diamond was situated in the current east end zone. Houses in left and center field were well within reach of hitters.

Northeastern added artificial turf to Parsons Field in 1972. At that time, the baseball diamond was relocated to its current position in the southern corner of the property, and the distances to the left and center field fences became 330 feet and 400 feet, respectively.

Parsons Field in 2026

== See also ==
- List of NCAA Division I baseball venues
