= Delaware Fightin' Blue Hens =

Intercollegiate sports teams of University of Delaware

- University: University of Delaware
- Nickname: Blue Hens
- NCAA: Division I
- Conference: CUSA (primary) List: AHA (women's ice hockey); ASUN (women's lacrosse + men's & women's swimming & diving); MAC (women's rowing); MPSF (field hockey); Summit (men's soccer); Atlantic 10 (men's lacrosse)
- Location: Newark, Delaware
- Varsity teams: 22
- Football stadium: Delaware Stadium
- Basketball arena: Bob Carpenter Center
- Ice hockey arena: Fred Rust Ice Arena
- Baseball stadium: Bob Hannah Stadium
- Softball stadium: Delaware Softball Diamond
- Soccer stadium: Stuart and Suzanne Grant Stadium
- Volleyball arena: Bob Carpenter Center
- Other venues: Delaware Field House
- Colors: Royal blue and gold
- Mascot: YoUDee
- Fight song: "The Delaware Fight Song"
- Website: bluehens.com

The Delaware Fightin' Blue Hens, alternately the Delaware Blue Hens, are the athletic teams of the University of Delaware (UD) of Newark, Delaware, in the United States. The Blue Hens compete in the Football Bowl Subdivision (FBS) of Division I of the National Collegiate Athletic Association (NCAA) as a member of Conference USA.

On November 28, 2023, UD and Conference USA (CUSA) jointly announced that UD would start a transition to the Division I Football Bowl Subdivision (FBS) in 2024 and join CUSA in 2025. UD continued to compete in both sides of the Coastal Athletic Association (CAA) in 2024–25; it was ineligible for the FCS playoffs due to NCAA rules for transitioning programs, but was eligible for all non-football CAA championships. Upon joining CUSA, UD has become eligible for all conference championship events except the football championship game; it will become eligible for that event upon completing the FBS transition in 2026. At the same time, UD also announced it would add one women's sport due to Title IX considerations, and would also be seeking conference homes for the seven sports that UD sponsors but CUSA does not. The new women's sport would later be announced as ice hockey; UD eventually joined Atlantic Hockey America for its first season of varsity play in 2025–26.

== Sports sponsored ==
Men's sports	Women's sports
Baseball	Basketball
Basketball	Cross country
Football	Field hockey
Golf	Golf
Lacrosse	Ice hockey
Soccer	Lacrosse
Swimming and diving	Rowing
Tennis	Soccer
	Softball
	Swimming and diving
	Tennis
	Track and field^{†}
	Volleyball
† – Track and field competes in both indoor and outdoor.

The Blue Hens have won twenty-two team CAA Championships since joining in 2001.

In January 2011, UD announced that men's cross country and outdoor track & field teams would be reclassified to club status, while women's golf would be added.

On November 20, 2016, the Delaware women's field hockey team won the 2016 NCAA Division I championship, defeating North Carolina, 3–2, under head coach Rolf van de Kerkhof.

=== Women's basketball ===
The 2000–01 Delaware team finished 26–5 overall and 17–1 in the America East Conference (where they were members from 1991 to 2001, before joining the CAA), and finished first in the regular season and won the conference tournament to qualify for their first NCAA bid. In the 2001 NCAA Women's Division I Basketball Tournament, they lost to the NC State Wolfpack team coached by the late Hall of Fame women's coach Kay Yow 76–57 in the first round. The 2006–07 Delaware team finished 26–5 overall and 16–2 in the CAA (3rd place) and earned a bid to the 2007 NCAA Women's Division I Basketball Tournament where they lost to the Michigan State Spartans coached by Joanne P. McCallie, who went on to coach at Duke from 2007 to 2020, by a score of 69–58.

The women's basketball team went undefeated in CAA play in the 2011–12 and 2012–13 seasons under head coach Tina Martin and All-American and future two-time WNBA MVP Elena Delle Donne. The 2011–12 team finished went 31–2 and undefeated in CAA play (18–0) to win the conference championship. They also won the CAA tournament to qualify for the CAA's automatic bid to the NCAA tournament, where the Fightin' Blue Hens won their first-round game against Arkansas–Little Rock (Note: Now athletically branded as Little Rock.) 73–42 before losing in the second round to Kansas 70–64. This win over UALR was the first by a Delaware women's team in NCAA tournament history. The 2012–13 team finished 32–4 overall, ranked #15 in the final AP poll. The 2012–13 team went undefeated in CAA play and also won the CAA tournament to qualify for the CAA's automatic bid to the NCAA tournament, where the Blue Hens won their first and second-round games against West Virginia (66–53) and North Carolina (78–69) before losing in the round of 16 to Kentucky (69–62). The 2012–23 team featured three seniors — Delle Donne (3,039 points, 5th all time in women's college basketball and a record at Delaware), Lauren Carra, and Danielle Parker (1,064 rebounds, also a career record at Delaware) — who scored 1,000 points during their careers, and point guard specialist Kayla Miller. This senior class, which includes Chelsea Craig and Jaquetta May, won more games (104) than any senior class in Delaware women's basketball history, and won two CAA championships.

Delaware women's cumulative NCAA tournament record is 3–4, the three wins being by the group of seniors Elena Delle Donne, Lauren Carra, Danielle Parker, Kayla Miller, Chelsea Craig and Jaquetta May who won 104 games together (some missing some games due to injuries).

=== Football ===
The Fighting Blue Hens football teams have won six national titles, including the 2003 NCAA Division I Football Championship. In 2007, the Delaware Blue Hens returned to the championship game, but were defeated by defending champion Appalachian State. In 2010 they were once again runners-up, that time to Eastern Washington.

Former head football coaches Bill Murray, Dave Nelson and Harold "Tubby" Raymond are College Football Hall of Fame inductees. Delaware is one of only two schools to have three straight head coaches inducted into the College Football Hall of Fame (Georgia Tech is the other).

=== Lacrosse ===
Delaware's first non-football NCAA National Championship came in 1983 for Women's Division I Lacrosse. The 2007 men's lacrosse program reached the final four of the NCAA Tournament for the first time in its history.

=== Soccer ===
The men's soccer team played in the 1968 and 1970 editions of the College Cup.

=== Women's ice hockey ===
In December 2023 it was announced Delaware would add one women's sport due to Title IX considerations. The new women's sport would later be announced as ice hockey, and Delaware was initially announced to be joining College Hockey America (CHA) for its first season of varsity play in 2025–26. However, by that time, CHA had already announced plans to merge with the men-only Atlantic Hockey Association after the 2023–24 season. In March 2024, Allison Coomey was named the inaugural head coach. On April 30, 2024, the merged conference was unveiled as Atlantic Hockey America, with Delaware joining on the previously announced 2025–26 schedule.

== Championships ==
=== NCAA national team championships ===
Delaware has won three NCAA Division I national team championships and one NCAA Division II national team championship:

Men (2)
- Football (Division I) (1): 2003
- Football (Division II) (1): 1979
Women (2)
- Field hockey (1): 2016
- Lacrosse (1): 1983

=== Other national team championships ===
Below are 13 national team titles that were not bestowed by the NCAA:

Men (4)
- AP College Division Football National Champions (3): 1946, 1971, 1972
- UPI College Division Football National Champions (3): 1963, 1971, 1972
Women (3)
- AIAW Lacrosse (Division II) (2): 1981, 1982
- IHSA Equestrian (1): 1997
Coed (6)
- Figure skating (6): 2002, 2011, 2013, 2014, 2015, 2016

=== Coastal Athletic Association conference team championships ===
Below are 35 CAA conference team titles that the Blue Hens have won since joining the CAA in 2001. In its final year as a member of the CAA (2024-25), field hockey, under head coach Rolf van de Kerkhof, was the only sport to garner the conference tournament championship title.

Men (12)
- Baseball (1): 2017
- Basketball (2): 2014, 2022
- Football (2): 2010, 2021 (spring)
- Lacrosse (5): 2007, 2010, 2011, 2022, 2023
- Soccer (2): 2011, 2016
Women (23)
- Basketball (3): 2012, 2013, 2022
- Field Hockey (12): 2004, 2009, 2013, 2014, 2015, 2016, 2017, 2019, 2020, 2021, 2022, 2024
- Golf (2): 2016, 2017
- Outdoor Track & Field (1): 2014
- Volleyball (5): 2007, 2008, 2010, 2011, 2023

== Notable non-varsity sports ==
=== Men's ice hockey ===
The men's ice hockey team is a club level college ice hockey program that plays its home games at the Fred Rust Ice Arena. The Fightin' Blue Hens are a member of the Eastern States Collegiate Hockey League, which plays at the American Collegiate Hockey Association Division I level. The Blue Hens won the 2012 ACHA Division 1 National Championship on March 7, 2012.

=== Men's crew ===
The men's club crew team was founded alongside the women's crew team by Coach Chuck Crawford, already well known for his 1972 World Championship in the Men's Lightweight 8+ and successful coaching career at Saint Joseph's Preparatory. The team has gained prominence in recent years, winning the Dad Vail Regatta lightweight freshmen eight event in 1993, 1994, and 2012 with the varsity lightweight eight winning bronze in 1994, and gold in 2013 and 2015. Since then, the lightweight program has gained national recognition; however, they are no longer racing via invitation in the Eastern Association of Rowing Colleges' championship, the EARC Sprints. For the heavyweight men, the varsity have reached the finals of the Dad Vail Regatta in 1994, 1995, 1996, 2006, 2010, and 2011 with the crews medaling in 1994, 1996, 2010, and 2011. The heavyweight freshmen won the Dad Vails title in 2008 and followed that with a silver in 2009 and a bronze in 2010.

=== Rugby ===
Founded in 1972, the University of Delaware Rugby Football Club plays in the East Conference of Division 1-A. Delaware are led by head coach Bjorn Haglid. Delaware reached the quarterfinals of the 2012 Collegiate Rugby Championship (CRC), the highest profile college rugby tournament in the country. The CRC is broadcast live on NBC, and is held every June at PPL Park in Philadelphia. Delaware reached the semifinals of the 2011 Las Vegas Invitational, the largest amateur rugby competition in the US, where they were led by star player Jimmy Kowalski. Delaware participated in the 2012 USA Rugby Sevens Collegiate National Championships where they finished third.

The rugby team was suspended by the university for five years after a 2013 I'm Shmacked party went out of control.

== Nickname ==
The athletic teams at Delaware are known as the Fightin' Blue Hens with a mascot named YoUDee. YoUDee is a Blue Hen Chicken, after the team names and the state bird of Delaware. YoUDee was elected into the mascot hall of fame in 2006 and is a seven-time UCA Open Division Mascot National Champion. At times, Delaware is also referred to as The Ass Kickin' Chickens.

== Intrastate competition ==
In November 2007, it was announced that the University of Delaware and Delaware State University would have their first football game against each other, the game being in the first round of the NCAA Division I Football Championship Subdivision playoffs. The game was played on November 23, with University of Delaware winning 44–7. Delaware was the victor in the teams' nine regular season match-ups (2009, 2011, 2012, 2013, 2014, 2016, 2017, 2019, and spring 2021).

== Fight song ==
"The Delaware Fight Song" first appeared in the Student Handbook in 1933. It was composed by alumnus George F. Kelly (Class of 1915).
