= UNC Wilmington Seahawks =

Intercollegiate sports teams of University of North Carolina Wilmington

- University: University of North Carolina Wilmington
- Nickname: Seahawks
- NCAA: Division I
- Conference: CAA (primary); Sun Belt (beach volleyball)
- Athletic director: Michael Oblinger
- Location: Wilmington, North Carolina
- Varsity teams: 19
- Basketball arena: Trask Coliseum
- Baseball stadium: Brooks Field
- Softball stadium: Boseman Field
- Soccer stadium: UNC Wilmington Soccer Stadium
- Other venues: Seahawk Natatorium (swimming and diving); Hanover Hall (volleyball)
- Colors: Teal, gold, and navy
- Mascot: Sammy C. Hawk
- Website: uncwsports.com

Colonial Athletic Association logo in UNC Wilmington's colors

The UNC Wilmington (UNCW) Seahawks are the varsity athletic teams representing the University of North Carolina Wilmington in Wilmington, North Carolina in intercollegiate athletics. The university sponsors eight teams for the men (baseball, basketball, cross country, golf, soccer, swimming and diving, tennis, and outdoor track & field only) and eleven for the women (basketball, cross country, golf, soccer, softball, swimming and diving, tennis, track & field (indoor and outdoor), volleyball, and beach volleyball). With the exception of beach volleyball (Sun Belt Conference), the Seahawks compete as a non-football member of NCAA Division I and are members of the Coastal Athletic Association.

== Sports sponsored ==
=== Individual teams ===
Men's sports	Women's sports
Baseball	Basketball
Basketball	Cross Country
Cross Country	Golf
Golf	Soccer
Soccer	Softball
Swimming & Diving	Swimming & Diving
Tennis	Tennis
Track & Field ^{1}	Track & Field ^{2}
	Volleyball
	Beach Volleyball
^{1}outdoor only – ^{2}indoor and outdoor

=== Baseball ===
UNC Wilmington won the Colonial Athletic Association's automatic bid to play in the NCAA regional playoffs in 2004, 2006, 2012, 2015, 2023 and 2024. In addition, the program received at-large bids to the NCAA Tournament in 2003, 2008 and 2016. UNCW set a Colonial Athletic Association record with four consecutive 40-win seasons from 2003–06 and set a school record with 44 victories in 2008, including a 21-game winning streak. The rich heritage of UNCW baseball began when the Seahawks captured the NCJAA 1961 and 1963 National Championships. The Seahawks have sent over 90 players to play professionally. UNCW has hosted the Colonial Athletic Association baseball tournament at Brooks Field eight consecutive years and 10 times overall.

=== Men's basketball ===
The UNC Wilmington basketball program moved to Division I in 1976-77. In 1984, the Seahawks joined the ECAC-South Conference (also known as the Colonial Athletic Association). In their first conference home game at Trask Coliseum the Seahawks defeated George Mason. The first appearance in a Colonial Athletic Association championship game came in 1987, just their third season of league play that saw them finish the regular season in 2nd place. UNCW appeared in three more Colonial Athletic Association title games (1989, 1996, 1998) before capturing their first championship in 2000 with a 57-47 win over Richmond. UNCW won the title again in 2006 by beating Hofstra, 78-67.

The Seahawks’ first votes in any Top 25 poll came early in the 1992-93 season. Other notable wins that captured the attention of pollsters included road wins at Miami (FL) and NC State (96-84). The first appearance in post-season play came in 1998 when they were selected for the NIT. They played again in the NIT in 2001.

==== Postseason Play ====
UNCW has made six appearances in the NCAA Tournament (2000, 2002, 2003, 2006, 2016, 2017), two in the NIT (1998, 2001), one in the CIT (2015) and one in the CBI (2022) in which the Seahawks won the CBI Championship.

In their first trip in 2000 they lost to the #2 seed Cincinnati, 64-47. In their second appearance in 2002, the 13th seeded Seahawks shocked the 4th seeded University of Southern California Trojans with a 93-89 overtime win. They were defeated by that year's tournament runner-up Indiana in the second round, 76-66. In 2003, they lost to Maryland on a last-second basket. Ironically, their close call losses in the tournaments for both seasons came at the hands of the two participants in the 2002 National Championship Game.

In 2006 the Seahawks earned a ninth seed in the Atlanta Regional as CAA conference champions, losing to #8 seed George Washington in overtime, 88-85. The Seahawks lost to #4 seed Duke (93-85) in 2016 as a 13 seed in the West Regional. In 2017, Virginia beat #12 seed UNCW (76-71) in the first round of the East Regional.

=== Men's soccer ===
The UNC Wilmington soccer team has appeared in four NCAA Tournaments, with their most recent appearance coming in 2018. They play their home matches at UNCW Soccer Stadium.

=== Women's basketball ===
The UNC Wilmington women's basketball program completed its 37th season of competition in 2010–11, including the last 25 as a member of the NCAA Division I ranks. The Seahawks began as a member of the Association for Intercollegiate Athletics for Women in 1973–74 and spent 10 years as a member until the association's disbandment following the 1982–83 season.

UNCW joined the National Association of Intercollegiate Athletics for one season, recording a program best mark of 22–6 that year before joining the NCAA Division I ranks as a member of the ECAC-South Conference in 1984 (the league changed its name to the Colonial Athletic Association in 1985).

The Seahawks have made two appearances in the Colonial Athletic Association championship game, falling both times to Old Dominion (92–49 in 2000 and 76–48 in 2002). UNCW's best regular-season finish came in 2010–11, when the Seahawks finished in a tie for second place with Old Dominion University, one game behind regular season champion James Madison.

=== Track and field ===
The men's and women's track & field programs have a long history of success including 11 Colonial Athletic Association Men's Team Championships, 168 Individual Champions, and 478 All-Colonial Athletic Association performances. The team has represented UNCW at the NCAA national level on 119 occasions, including nine times at the NCAA Finals. Anna Raynor was named an All-American in the javelin on three occasions. She also finished third at the USA National Championships in 2007 and competed at the US Olympic Trials in 2008. Seahawk track & field athletes have been named Colonial Athletic Association Most Valuable Athlete six times, and Colonial Athletic Association Athlete of the Year four times. Academically, they have earned U.S. Track & Field and Cross Country Coaches Association All-Academic individual (35x) and team (38x) recognition, as well as Colonial Athletic Association Scholar Athlete of the Year on four occasions.

=== Additional athletics ===
The men's swimming and diving team has won the Colonial Athletic Association title for 12 consecutive years, from 2002 through 2013. The men's tennis team has won the Colonial Athletic Association title twice in the last three years (2009, 2011) by defeating Virginia Commonwealth University. The men's golf team has won nine conference championships: 2004, 2005, 2011, 2012, 2013, 2018, 2019, 2023, and 2026. The women's golf team has won four conference championships: 2007, 2008, 2011, and 2012. UNC Wilmington also captured the men's and women's Colonial Athletic Association soccer titles in 2009.

UNC Wilmington introduced beach volleyball as a sponsored athletics offering in the spring of 2015 and participated in its first competitive season in the spring of 2016. UNCW joined the Coastal Collegiate Sports Association in 2016–17, and has since changed conferences twice—first to the ASUN Conference in 2021–22, and then to the Sun Belt Conference in 2022–23.

=== Sammy C. Hawk ===
"Sammy" is the official name of UNCW's costumed Seahawk mascot. The name "Sammy" was selected for its gender-neutral connotation.

In Hebrew, “Sammy” is a familiar form of the biblical name Samuel (שְׁמוּאֵל, Shmuel), meaning “God has heard.” UNCW's Seahawk is a mythical creature, born from the sun, who lives in the Atlantic Ocean as a fish. During the sports season the Seahawk is able to shapeshift into the form of a bird of prey to feast on the opponents. In order to transmutate Sammy needs the mystical basketball that was left in Wilmington during the "Blizzard" that hit the city in the early part of the 21st century bringing with it 3 championships.

== Off-Campus Housing ==
Students at UNC Wilmington have access to a variety of off-campus housing options in the Wilmington area. The proximity of the university to both downtown Wilmington and the beach makes the surrounding neighborhoods popular among the student population.

=== Seahawk Cove ===
Seahawk Cove is a prominent off-campus student housing community located near the UNCW campus. Designed with students in mind, Seahawk Cove offers a range of apartment-style units and amenities tailored to the needs of college students. The community provides features such as furnished units and social areas. Its location offers convenient access to the university, making it a popular choice among UNCW students seeking off-campus accommodations.
