= Towson Tigers =

Intercollegiate sports teams of Towson University

- University: Towson University
- NCAA: Division I (FCS)
- Conference: CAA (primary); EAGL (women's gymnastics)
- Athletic director: Steve Eigenbrot
- Location: Towson, Maryland
- Varsity teams: 19
- Football stadium: Johnny Unitas Stadium
- Basketball arena: SECU Arena
- Baseball stadium: John B. Schuerholz Park
- Nickname: Tigers
- Colors: Black and gold
- Mascot: Doc
- Fight song: Hail Towson
- Website: towsontigers.com
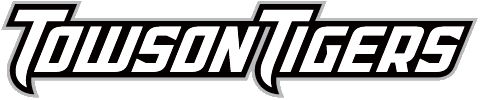

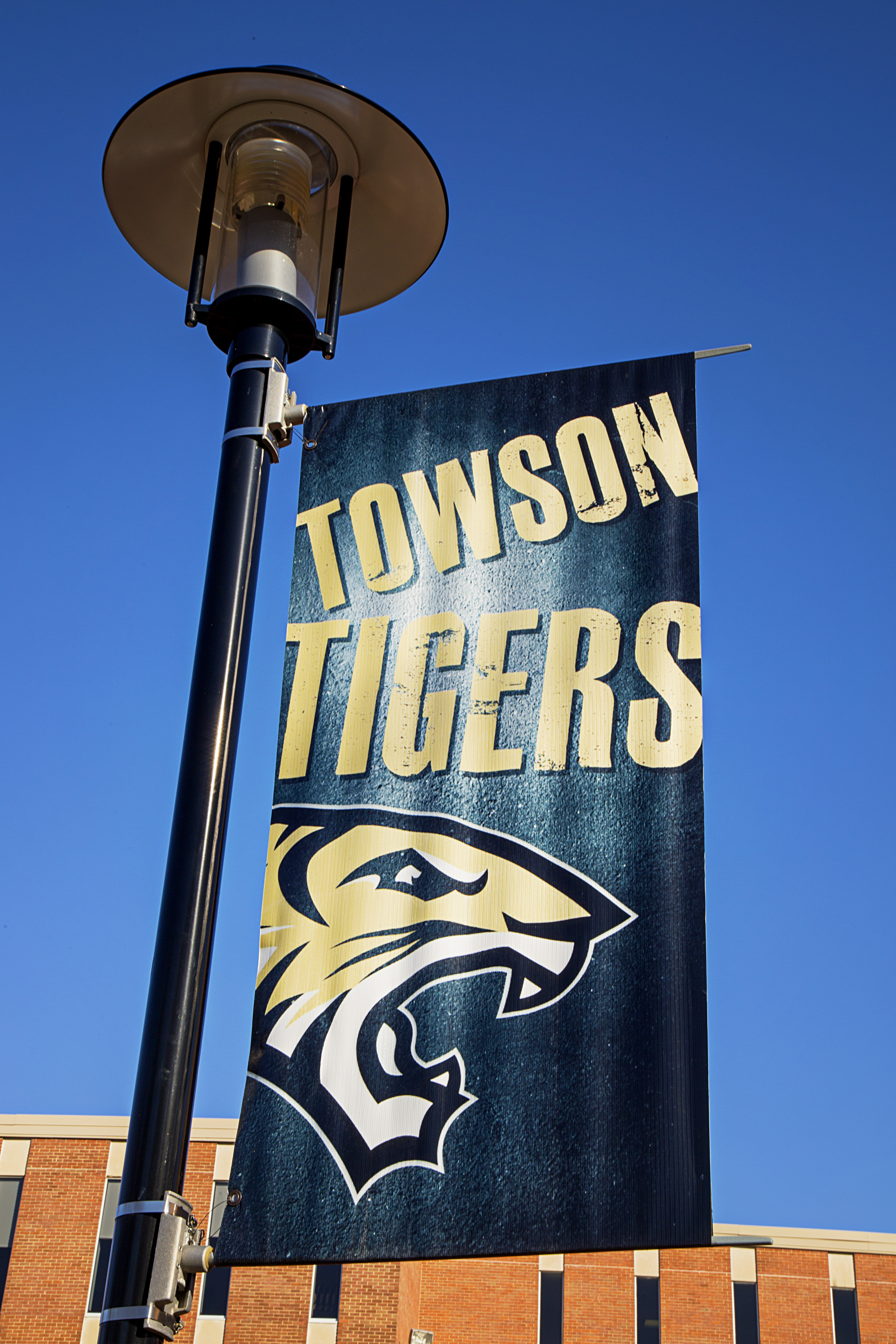
A Tigers banner on the Towson University campus

The Towson Tigers, formerly the Towson College Knights, are the athletics teams of Towson University. All of the major athletic teams compete in the Coastal Athletic Association with 19 Division I athletic teams (13 in women's sports, 6 in men's sports). Gymnastics competes in the EAGL conference, having rejoined the league in the Spring of 2012.

Since joining the CAA in 2001–02, the Tigers have won 16 league championships; the Tigers have won titles in football, baseball, men's lacrosse, women's lacrosse, men's soccer, men's golf, women's swimming and diving, and volleyball. In addition, the women's gymnastics program has captured six ECAC Championships (2005, 2006, 2007, 2008, 2009, 2010).

During an athletics history that traces its roots to the 1920s, Towson has sent teams and individual student-athletes to NCAA post-season competition in baseball, basketball, football, golf, gymnastics, lacrosse, soccer, swimming, track & field and volleyball.

In May 2011, the department broke ground on the SECU Arena, a 5,000-seat, state-of-the-art arena for basketball, volleyball and gymnastics. The arena was completed in May 2013 and opened in June of that year.

== Varsity teams ==
Towson University sponsors teams in six men's and thirteen women's NCAA sanctioned sports:

Men's sports	Women's sports
Baseball	Basketball
Basketball	Cross country
Football	Field hockey
Golf	Golf
Lacrosse	Gymnastics
Swimming & diving	Lacrosse
	Soccer
	Softball
	Swimming & diving
	Tennis
	Track & field^{1}
	Volleyball
^{1} – includes both indoor and outdoor.

- * = The gymnastics team competes in the Eastern College Athletic Conference.

Changes since 2000 to the men's programs include the elimination of several varsity sports in the 2003–04 school year: indoor track, outdoor track, cross country, tennis. Changes to the women's programs include the additions of golf in 2007. Men's soccer was shut down in 2013. The university's initial intention was to get rid of soccer and baseball programs, in order to save more than $800,000 a year.

== Football ==
The Tigers won the 2011 CAA Championship with a 7–1 conference record. Towson became the first team in NCAA history to compete in the playoffs at all three levels of competition in football (DI, DII and DIII). Following the 2011 season, Head Coach Rob Ambrose won the Eddie Robinson Award as the top college football coach in Division I Football Championship Subdivision (formerly Division I-AA), and Towson freshmen running back Terrance West won the inaugural Jerry Rice Award as the most outstanding freshman player in Division I Football Championship Subdivision.

== Basketball ==
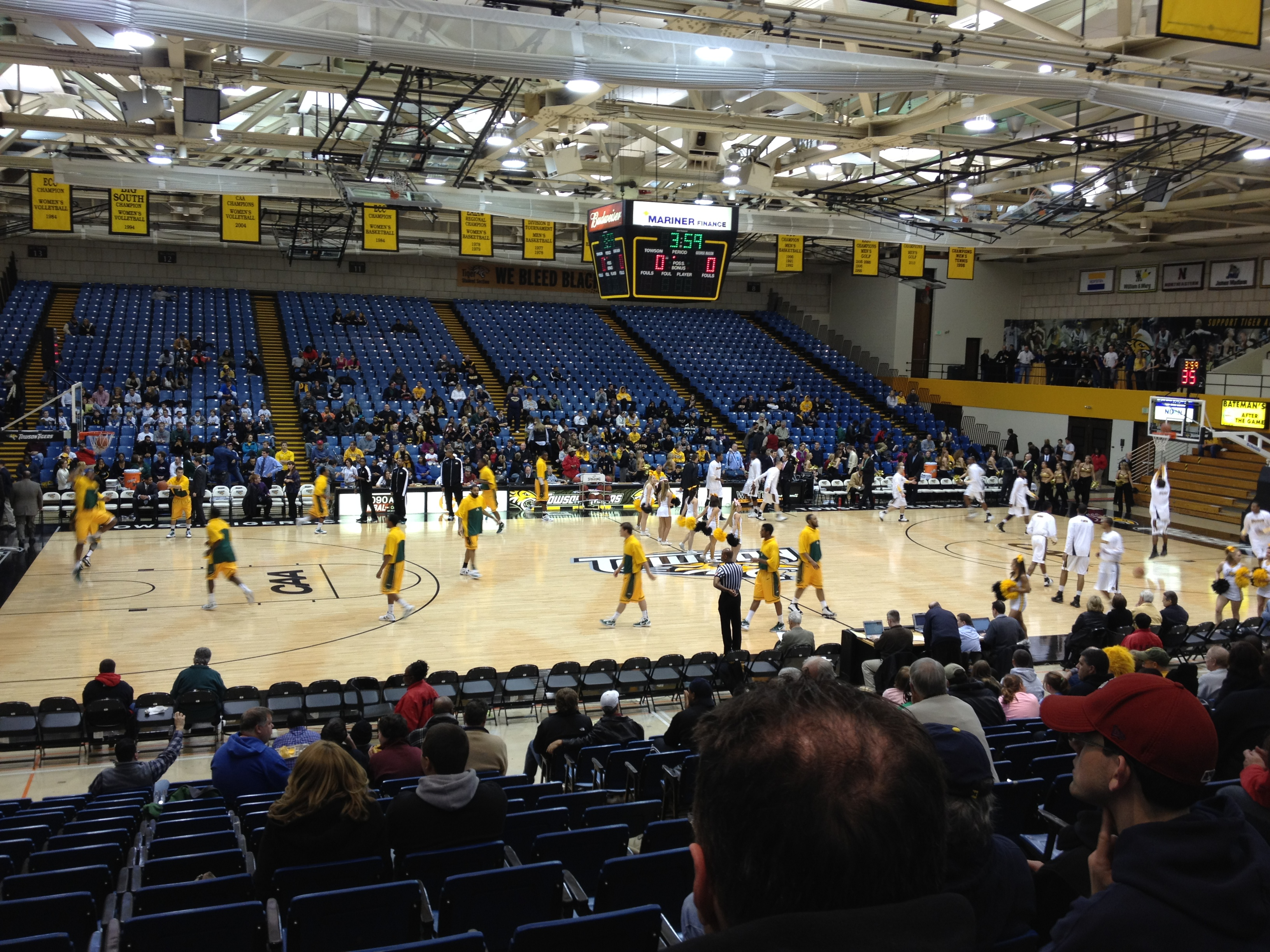
Towson Tigers men's basketball

== Lacrosse ==
Towson's men's lacrosse team is a nationally known program, regularly appearing in the NCAA tournament with two NCAA finals appearances to their credit. In 1974, the Tigers finished with a 14–1 record and won the Division II national title with an 18–17 overtime win over Hobart. The team also reached the finals of the 1991 NCAA Division I Men's Lacrosse Championship, and reached the semifinals of the 2001 NCAA Division I Men's Lacrosse Championship. The Tigers maintain an annual rivalry with the Loyola Greyhounds (see Loyola–Towson lacrosse rivalry).

== Notable non-varsity sports ==
=== Rugby ===
Founded in 1975, Towson University men's rugby club plays college rugby in Division 1AA in the MARC against local rivals from Maryland, DC, West Virginia and Pennsylvania. Towson rugby has been led by head coach Tony De Cesare, with assistance coach Tim Cahill.

In 2012, Towson reached the Division 2 national playoffs, defeating Boston University in the round of 16 and Colgate in the quarterfinals, before losing to Salisbury in the semifinals. Towson finished the 2012 season with a 14–5 record, ranked #5 in the nation in Division 2, with flyhalf Christian Lowe named to the All Division 2 team. In the 2013 season, Towson again reached the Division 2 national playoffs. Towson defeated Illinois State 34–19 in the round of 16, and defeated UNC-Wilmington 30–5 in the quarterfinals, before once again falling to rival Salisbury 23–10 in the semifinals.

== CAA Championship teams ==
=== Men's ===
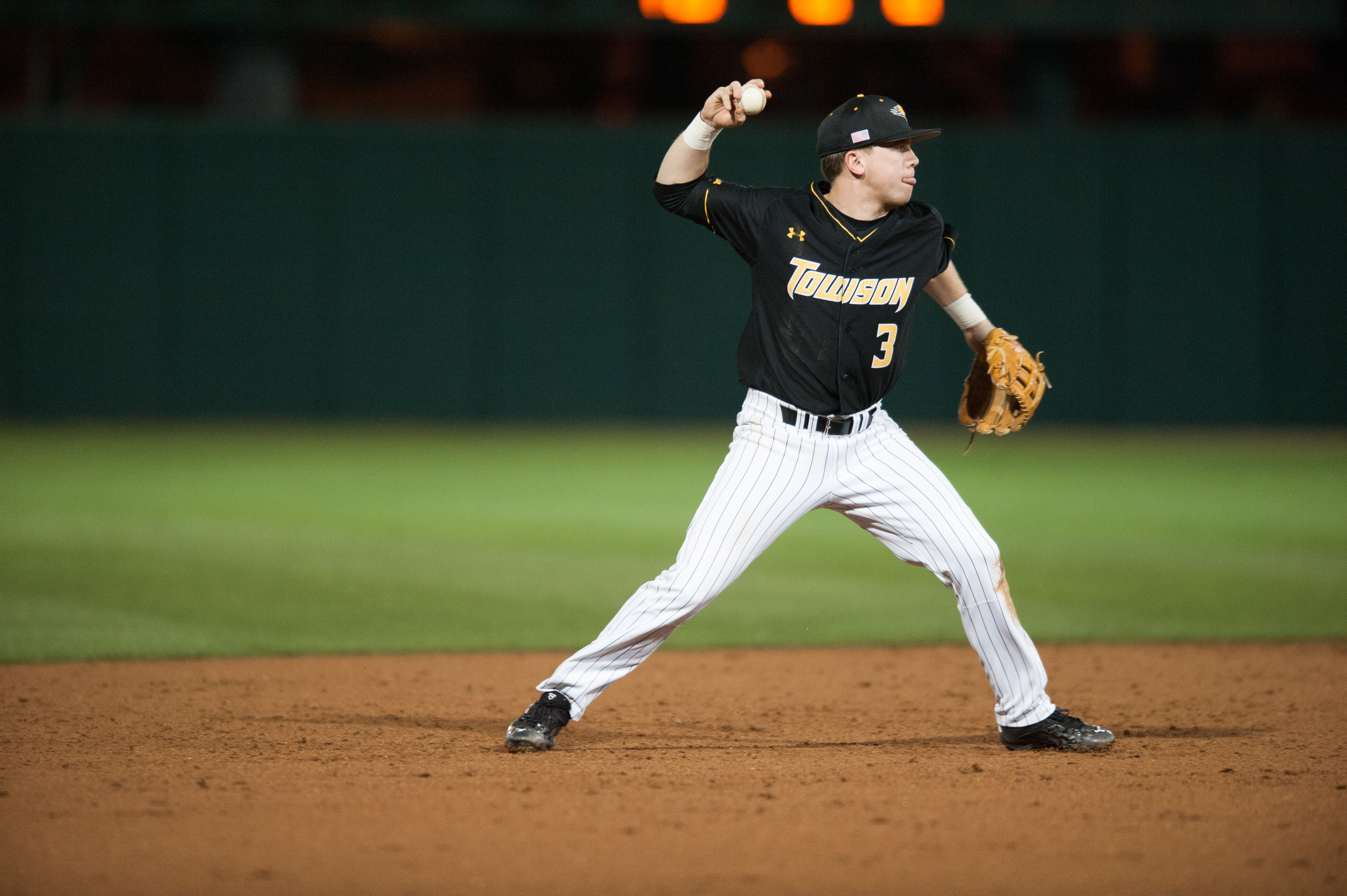
Towson Tigers baseball in 2015

Colonial Athletic Association logo in Towson's colors

- Baseball: 2013
- Football: 2011, 2012
- Golf: 2010
- Lacrosse: 2003, 2004, 2005, 2013, 2015, 2016, 2019
- Soccer: 2006
- Swimming & Diving: 2021

=== Women's ===
- Basketball: 2018–19
- Lacrosse: 2005, 2008, 2009, 2012, 2013, 2014, 2016
- Swimming and Diving: 2008, 2009, 2010, 2011, 2013, 2014, 2015
- Track & Field (outdoor): 2017
- Volleyball: 2004, 2019, 2020, 2021, 2022
- Soccer: 2023

== Notable athletes ==
=== Football ===
- Sean Landeta
- Dave Meggett
- Jermon Bushrod
- Terrance West
- Jordan Dangerfield
- Tye Smith

=== Baseball ===
- Chris Nabholz
- Casper Wells

=== Basketball ===
- Tamir Goodman
- Gary Neal
- Jerrelle Benimon

=== Men's soccer ===
- Phil Greatwich
- Pat Healey
- Machel Millwood
- Nigel Marples

=== Gymnastics ===
- Kacy Catanzaro
- Julija Kovaliova
