= Elon Phoenix women's soccer =

American college soccer team

- University: Elon University
- Head coach: Neil Payne
- Location: Elon, North Carolina, US
- Nickname: Phoenix
- Colors: Maroon and gold

NCAA tournament appearances
- 1999, 2020, 2025

Conference tournament championships
- 1991, 1992, 1993, 1995, 1996, 1999, 2020, 2025

The Elon Phoenix women's soccer team represents Elon University in NCAA Division I college soccer. The Phoenix are led by head coach Neil Payne.

== History ==
Elon women's soccer began play in the 1986 season.

The Phoenix have won conference titles in 1991, 1992, 1993, 1995, 1996, 1999, 2020, and 2025.

Their 1991, 1992, 1993, 1995, and 1996 conference titles were won as members of the South Atlantic Conference in Division II.

Elon joined the Big South Conference for the 1999 season and went on to win the conference title. They lost in the NCAA first round to Duke.

In 2020, Elon won the CAA conference championship in the COVID-19 impacted season. In the NCAA tournament they lost in the first round to Milwaukee.

In 2025, the Phoenix won their second CAA conference tournament championship, winning a 6–5 penalty shootout. They earned the CAA’s NCAA tournament autobid.
