= Northeastern Huskies women's soccer =

American college soccer team

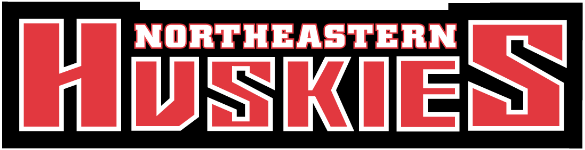
- Founded: 1996
- University: Northeastern University
- Head coach: Ashley Phillips (2nd season)
- Conference: CAA
- Location: Boston, Massachusetts, US
- Stadium: Parsons Field (capacity: 7,000)
- Nickname: Huskies
- Colors: Red and black

NCAA tournament Round of 32
- 2008, 2014

NCAA tournament appearances
- 2008, 2013, 2014, 2016

Conference tournament championships
- 2008, 2013, 2014, 2016

Conference regular season championships
- 2014

The Northeastern Huskies women's soccer team represents Northeastern University in NCAA Division I college soccer. The team belongs to the Colonial Athletic Association and plays home games at Parsons Field. The Huskies are currently led by second-year head coach Ashley Phillips. The team has an all-time record 183–185–46 (.498) through the 2016 season. The Huskies have made 4 appearances in the NCAA tournament with a combined record of 2–3, having made the tournament in 2008, 2013, 2014 and 2016.

== Head coaches ==
- Julia Claudio, 1996–98 (11–38–7 (.259))
- Ed Matz, 1999–2009 (99–91–25 (.518))
- Tracey Leone, 2010–2015 (59–49–14 (.541))
- Ashley Phillips, 2016–present (14–7–1 (.659))

== Record by year ==
Conference Regular Season Champions^{†}	Conference Tournament Champions^{‡}	Conference Regular Season & Tournament Champions^{♦}	National champions^{^}	Shared standing T

Season	Conference	Head coach	Season Results			Postseason result	
Season	Conference	Head coach	Overall	Conference	Conference Standings	Postseason result	
1996	Independent	Julia Claudio	5–10–2				
1997	America East	Julia Claudio	4–11–4	0–7–2	9th		
1998	America East	Julia Claudio	2–17–1	0–8–1	10th		
1999	America East	Ed Matz	6–13–1	2–7–0	8th		
2000	America East	Ed Matz	11–7–1	5–4–0	5th		
2001	America East	Ed Matz	7–6–4	3–5–3	9th		
2002	America East	Ed Matz	8–8–4	4–2–2	4th		
2003	America East	Ed Matz	11–8–0	5–4–0	5th		
2004	America East	Ed Matz	12–7–2	5–3–1	5th		
2005	Colonial Athletic Association	Ed Matz	6–12–1	3–8–0			
2006	Colonial Athletic Association	Ed Matz	9–6–4	5–3–3	3rd		
2007	Colonial Athletic Association	Ed Matz	4–11–3	2–7–2	12th		
2008‡	Colonial Athletic Association	Ed Matz	13–9–2	6–5–0	6th	NCAA 2nd Round	
2009†	Colonial Athletic Association	Ed Matz	12–4–3	7–1–3	1st		
2010	Colonial Athletic Association	Tracey Leone	9–8–1	4–6–1	7th		
2011	Colonial Athletic Association	Tracey Leone	9–10–2	5–5–1	7th		
2012	Colonial Athletic Association	Tracey Leone	9–9–1	7–3–0	4th		
2013‡	Colonial Athletic Association	Tracey Leone	6–9–6	5–2–2	3rd	NCAA First Round	
2014♦	Colonial Athletic Association	Tracey Leone	15–4–3	7–1–1	1st	NCAA 2nd Round	
2015	Colonial Athletic Association	Tracey Leone	11–8–1	4–4–1	5th		
2016	Colonial Athletic Association	Tracey Leone	Ashley Phillips	14–7–1	7–2	1st	NCAA 1st Round
2017	Colonial Athletic Association	Tracey Leone	Ashley Phillips	13–6–3	5–1–3	3rd	
