= Hofstra Pride =

Intercollegiate sports teams of Hofstra University

- University: Hofstra University
- Nickname: Pride
- NCAA: Division I
- Conference: Coastal Athletic Association (primary); EIWA (Wrestling)
- Athletic director: Rick Cole Jr.
- Location: Hempstead, New York
- Varsity teams: 19 (9 men's, 10 women's)
- Arena: Mack Sports Complex (4,223)
- Lacrosse stadium: James M. Shuart Stadium (13,000)
- Other venues: Nassau Veterans Memorial Coliseum
- Colors: Blue, white, and gold
- Mascot: Willie and Kate Pride
- Fight song: March On, Hofstra
- Website: gohofstra.com
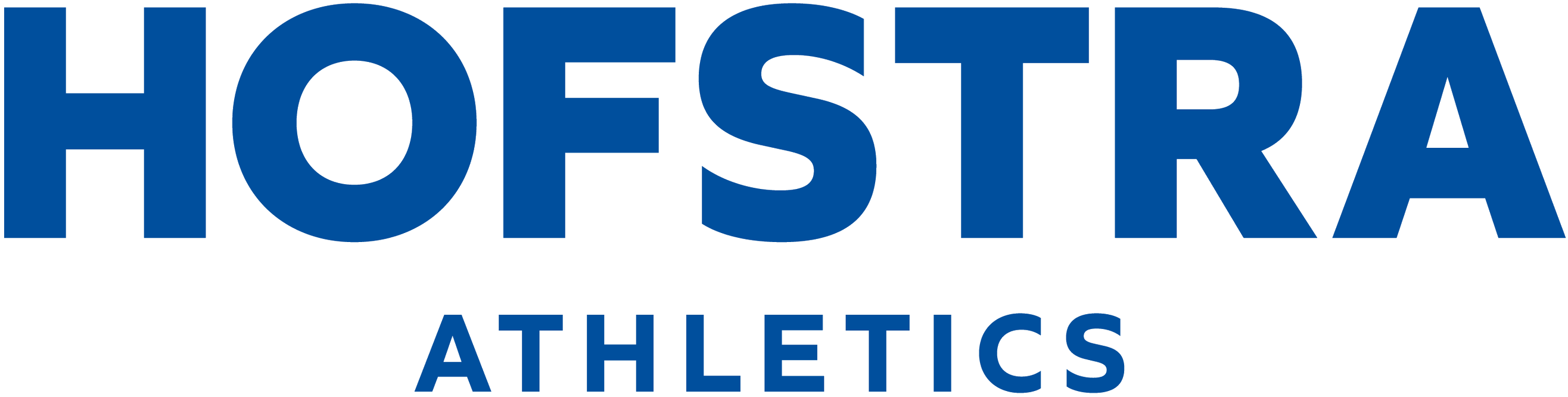

The Hofstra Pride (formerly the Hofstra Flying Dutchmen) are composed of 17 teams representing Hofstra University in intercollegiate athletics, including men and women's basketball, cross-country running, golf, lacrosse, soccer, tennis and track and field. Men's sports include baseball and wrestling. Women's sports include volleyball, field hockey, and softball. The Pride compete in the NCAA Division I and have been members of the Coastal Athletic Association in most sports since 2001. They were previously members of the America East Conference.

Until 2001, Hofstra's nickname was the Flying Dutchmen (shortened to simply "Dutchmen" or "Dutch"), a homage to the Dutch heritage of university founder William S. Hofstra. The Pride refer to the two lions on Hofstra's longtime logo, which school officials felt was more meaningful.

== Teams ==
Men's sports	Women's sports
Baseball	Basketball
Basketball	Cross country
Cross country	Field Hockey
Golf	Golf
Lacrosse	Lacrosse
Soccer	Softball
Tennis	Soccer
Track and field^{1}	Tennis
Wrestling	Track and field^{1}
	Volleyball
^{1} – includes both indoor and outdoor

=== Basketball ===
The men's basketball team experienced its most successful years in 2000 and 2001, winning back-to-back America East men's basketball tournament titles and making their first appearances in the Division I championship since the 1970s. Jimmy Hall played for the team in 2012–13. In 2020, Hofstra defeated Northeastern in the CAA championship by a score of 70-61 to claim their first conference title since departing from the America East. Despite punching their ticket to that year's NCAA tournament, the Pride would be unable to compete due to the tournament's cancellation amidst the Covid-19 pandemic. Speedy Claxton, the star on the 2000 team, was named the head coach the following year on April 7, 2021. Claxton would lead his alma mater back to the NCAA tournament in 2026, where the team would fall to Alabama 90-70 in the first round.

=== Baseball ===
The Hofstra Pride baseball team represents Hofstra University in NCAA Division I college baseball. The team plays its home games at University Field in Hempstead, New York. The Pride qualified for its first NCAA Division I baseball tournament in 2022 by winning the CAA baseball tournament.

=== Wrestling ===
The Hofstra University Pride Wrestling team competes in the Eastern Intercollegiate Wrestling Association in the NCAA Division I Wrestling Championships.

In 1977, Hofstra wrestler Nick Gallo won the NCAA National Championship in the 126 lb weight class and was a member of the 1976 and 1980 U.S. Olympic Freestyle Wrestling teams. He was also given the title "Most Outstanding Wrestler" in the 1977 NCAA Division I Wrestling Championships.

Dennis Papadatos is the current head coach. The Pride wrestling team competes on campus in the Mack Sports Complex. Former Pride wrestler Chris Weidman was a 2-time NCAA Division I All-American (6th in 2006 & 3rd in 2007, both at 197 lb) and is a prior UFC Middleweight Champion. Hofstra can claim 30 All-American honors among 19 wrestlers through 2018.

Hofstra's wrestling team was formerly a member of the CAA like all other Pride teams until the CAA ended sponsorship of wrestling in 2013.

== Discontinued sports ==
=== Football ===
The school fielded a football team from 1937 to 2009, when the sport was cancelled due to costs and declining attendance. The team was an associate member of the Atlantic 10 Conference from 2001 until 2009. Funds previously used for the football program went into the creation of the medical school, and enhancing a variety of programs, including hard sciences and engineering.

== Conference history ==
- Metropolitan New York Conference (1942–1943)
- East Coast Conference (1965–1994) (some sports competed as independents)
- North Atlantic Conference/America East Conference (1994–2001)
- Coastal Athletic Association (2001–present) (football competed in the A-10 until 2006)

== References in popular culture ==
Two of Bill Cosby's early comedy albums include routines about a game between the now-defunct Hofstra football team and Temple University. The routines are "TV Football" (from I Started Out as a Child) and its expanded re-telling "Hofstra" (from Why Is There Air?).

An entire episode of Everybody Loves Raymond was devoted to a main character, Frank Barone, catching a record-setting field goal ball kicked by a Hofstra player at a game against Northeastern that Ray Barone predicted to be a "tickle fight".

== See also ==
- List of NCAA Division I non-football programs
