= List of U.S. state birds =

A map of the U.S. showing in red which states and territories have an official state bird.

Below is a list of U.S. state birds as designated by each state's, district's or territory's government.

The selection of state birds began with Kentucky adopting the northern cardinal in 1926. It continued when the legislatures for Alabama, Florida, Maine, Missouri, Oregon, Texas and Wyoming selected their state birds after a campaign was started by the General Federation of Women's Clubs to name official state birds in the 1920s. The last state to officially adopt its bird was New York in 1970.

Pennsylvania never chose an official state bird, but did choose the ruffed grouse as the state game bird. Alaska, California, and South Dakota permit hunting of their state birds. Alabama, Georgia, Massachusetts, Missouri, Oklahoma, South Carolina, and Tennessee have designated an additional "state game bird" for the purpose of hunting. The northern cardinal is the state bird of seven states, followed by the western meadowlark as the state bird of six states.

The District of Columbia designated the wood thrush as district bird in 1938. Of the five inhabited territories of the United States, American Samoa and Puerto Rico are the only ones without territorial birds.

== State birds ==
State, district, or territory	Bird	Scientific name	Picture	Year
Alabama	Yellowhammer (northern flicker)	Colaptes auratus		1927
Alaska	Willow ptarmigan	Lagopus lagopus		1955
American Samoa	None, although the bald eagle is displayed on the flag.	—N/a	—N/a	—N/a
Arizona	Cactus wren	Campylorhynchus brunneicapillus		1931
Arkansas	Northern mockingbird	Mimus polyglottos		1929
California	California quail	Callipepla californica		1931
Colorado	Lark bunting	Calamospiza melanocorys		1931
Connecticut	American robin	Turdus migratorius		1943
Delaware	Blue Hen Chicken	Gallus gallus domesticus		1939
District of Columbia	Wood thrush	Hylocichla mustelina		1938
Florida	Northern mockingbird	Mimus polyglottos		1927
Georgia	Brown thrasher	Toxostoma rufum		1928
Guam	Guam rail (ko'ko')	Gallirallus owstoni		2000
Hawaii	Nene (Hawaiian goose)	Branta sandvicensis		1957
Idaho	Mountain bluebird	Sialia currucoides		1931
Illinois	Northern cardinal	Cardinalis cardinalis		1929
Indiana	Northern cardinal	Cardinalis cardinalis		1933
Iowa	Eastern goldfinch (American goldfinch)	Spinus tristis tristis		1933
Kansas	Western meadowlark	Sturnella neglecta		1933
Kentucky	Northern cardinal	Cardinalis cardinalis		1926
Louisiana	Eastern brown pelican	Pelecanus occidentalis		1966
Maine	Chickadee	Poecile, species not specified (de facto Poecile atricapillus)		1927
Maryland	Baltimore oriole	Icterus galbula		1947
Massachusetts	Black-capped chickadee	Poecile atricapillus		1941
Michigan	American robin	Turdus migratorius		1931
Minnesota	Common loon	Gavia immer		1961
Mississippi	Northern mockingbird	Mimus polyglottos		1944
Missouri	Eastern bluebird	Sialia sialis		1927
Montana	Western meadowlark	Sturnella neglecta		1941
Nebraska	Western meadowlark	Sturnella neglecta		1929
Nevada	Mountain bluebird	Sialia currucoides		1967
New Hampshire	Purple finch	Haemorhous purpureus		1957
New Jersey	Eastern goldfinch (American goldfinch)	Spinus tristis tristis		1935
New Mexico	Greater roadrunner	Geococcyx californianus		1949
New York	Eastern bluebird	Sialia sialis		1970
North Carolina	Northern cardinal	Cardinalis cardinalis		1943
North Dakota	Western meadowlark	Sturnella neglecta		1947
Northern Mariana Islands	Mariana fruit-dove	Ptilinopus roseicapilla		?
Ohio	Northern cardinal	Cardinalis cardinalis		1933
Oklahoma	Scissor-tailed flycatcher	Tyrannus forficatus		1951
Oregon	Western meadowlark (state songbird) (Note: The western meadowlark was proclaimed the state bird of Oregon by Governor I. L. Patterson in 1927, but the Legislative Assembly never adopted it as official state bird. In 2017, the western meadowlark was made the official state songbird and the osprey was made the official state raptor.)	Sturnella neglecta		1927; 2017
Pennsylvania	Ruffed grouse (state game bird) (Note: The ruffed grouse was named Pennsylvania's "state game bird" per 1931 Act 234.)	Bonasa umbellus		1931
Puerto Rico	Puerto Rican spindalis (de facto)	Spindalis portoricensis		—
Rhode Island	Rhode Island Red	Gallus gallus domesticus		1954
South Carolina	Carolina wren	Thryothorus ludovicianus		1948
South Dakota	Ring-necked pheasant	Phasianus colchicus		1943
Tennessee	Northern mockingbird	Mimus polyglottos		1933
Texas	Northern mockingbird	Mimus polyglottos		1927
Utah	California gull	Larus californicus		1955
Vermont	Hermit thrush	Catharus guttatus		1941
Virgin Islands	Bananaquit	Coereba flaveola		1970
Virginia	Northern cardinal	Cardinalis cardinalis		1950
Washington	Willow goldfinch (American goldfinch)	Spinus tristis salicamans		1951
West Virginia	Northern cardinal	Cardinalis cardinalis		1949
Wisconsin	American robin	Turdus migratorius		1949
Wyoming	Western meadowlark	Sturnella neglecta		1927

== Other state birds ==
Map showing in red which U.S. states and territories have designated a state bird in addition to their official state bird

In addition to having a state bird, some states have chosen a state game bird (or state wild game bird), a state waterfowl (or state duck), a state raptor, a state migratory bird, or a bird as their state symbol of peace.

State	State bird	Scientific name	Photography	Year
Alabama	Wild turkey (state game bird)	Meleagris gallopavo		1980
Delaware	Red knot (state migratory bird)	Calidris canutus		2025
Georgia	Bobwhite quail (state game bird)	Colinus virginianus		1970
Idaho	Peregrine falcon (state raptor)	Falco peregrinus		2004
Massachusetts	Wild turkey (state game bird)	Meleagris gallopavo		1991
Michigan	Wood duck (state duck)	Aix sponsa		2026
Mississippi	Wood duck (state waterfowl)	Aix sponsa		1974
Missouri	Bobwhite quail (state game bird)	Colinus virginianus		2007
New Hampshire	Red-tailed hawk (state raptor)	Buteo jamaicensis		2019
Oklahoma	Wild turkey (state game bird)	Meleagris gallopavo		1990
Oregon	Osprey (state raptor)	Pandion haliaetus		2017
Pennsylvania	Ruffed grouse (state game bird)	Bonasa umbellus		1931
South Carolina	Northern mockingbird (former state bird)	Mimus polyglottos		1939 – 1948
South Carolina	Wild turkey (state wild game bird)	Meleagris gallopavo		1976
South Carolina	Wood duck (state duck)	Aix sponsa		2009
South Carolina	Prothonotary warbler (state migratory bird)	Protonotaria citrea		2026
Tennessee	Bobwhite quail (state wild game bird)	Colinus virginianus		1987
Wisconsin	Eastern mourning dove (state symbol of peace)	Zenaida macroura carolinensis		1971

== States with the same state bird ==
Some state birds are shared between multiple states. Of the 50 states, a total of 32 do not have a unique state bird.

Northern cardinal Western meadowlark Northern mockingbird American robin American goldfinch Chickadee Chicken Eastern bluebird Mountain bluebird Unique state bird

Bird	# of states
Northern cardinal	7
Western meadowlark	6
Northern mockingbird	5 (Note: and formerly South Carolina)
Wild turkey (state game bird or wild game bird)	4
American robin	3
Bobwhite quail (state game bird or wild game bird)	3
American goldfinch	3 (Note: 2 as "eastern goldfinch", 1 as "willow goldfinch")
Wood duck (state waterfowl or duck)	3
Chickadee	2 (Note: 1 as "black-capped chickadee", 1 as "chickadee")
Chicken	2 (Note: 1 as "Rhode Island Red", 1 as "Delaware Blue Hen")
Eastern bluebird	2
Mountain bluebird	2

== See also ==
- List of U.S. state dinosaurs
