= YoUDee =

Mascot of the University of Delaware

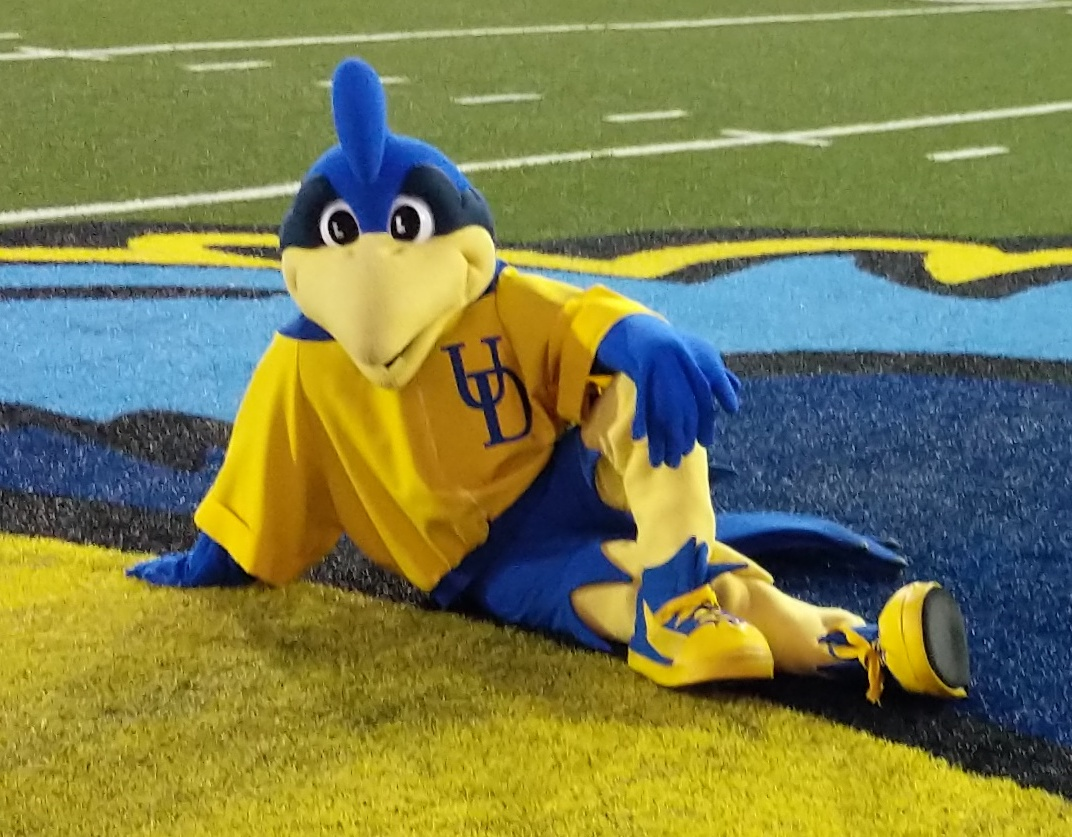
- YoUDee reclining on Raymond Field
- University: University of Delaware
- Conference: CUSA
- Description: Blue Hen Chicken
- First seen: 1993
- Related mascot(s): Baby Blue, Air YouDee
- Hall of Fame: 2006

YoUDee (pronounced yoo-dee) is a mascot of the University of Delaware, along with Baby Blue. It is an anthropomorphic "fighting Blue Hen", and its species is the blue hen, as the state bird of Delaware. While YoUDee appears masculine and can have male or female performers, it is "officially androgynous", "neither female or male".

According to the University of Delaware, YoUDee's colors are Blue and Gold because its great-great-great-grandfather was awarded the gold medal for Valor during the Battle of Trenton in the American Revolutionary War. The men in the company commanded by Captain Jonathan Caldwell actually carried Blue Hens with them into combat in order to hold cockfights in their spare time. It is said that the men under Capt. Caldwell had bravery in battles that was comparable to their fighting blue hen chickens.

== History ==
=== Pre-YoUDee ===
In 1911, the University of Delaware adopted the Blue Hen as its official mascot.

In the 1930s, the initial physical mascot was a live blue chicken that was tended to by members of the cheerleading team. It is unclear if it was a blue hen, or a chicken with blue feathers, as it is believed there are no true descendants of "fighting blue hens of Revolutionary War times."

Starting in 1950, several costumed "Fightin' Blue Hen" mascots existed. Little is known about them besides the fact that they were "a variety of light and dark blue suits." Few photographs of them can be found. All of the costumes were presumably retired before YoUDee appeared.

One reader of The News Journal in Wilmington requested that one of the old mascot's costume should be displayed in the nearby Bob Carpenter Center. This reader was not alone, as a petition with over 1,000 signatures circulated the state of Delaware, demanding the same. The Athletics Department responded and objected to the petition on the grounds that there was no room for it, and that "it would be inappropriate." Articles from the time indicated that at football games, the old mascots were ridiculed and pelted with items such as "marshmallows" and "batteries" by students on a frequent basis. It is unclear if this was a recurring skit coordinated by the mascot team, or represented student emotions at the time.

Costumed University of Delaware mascots before YoUDee

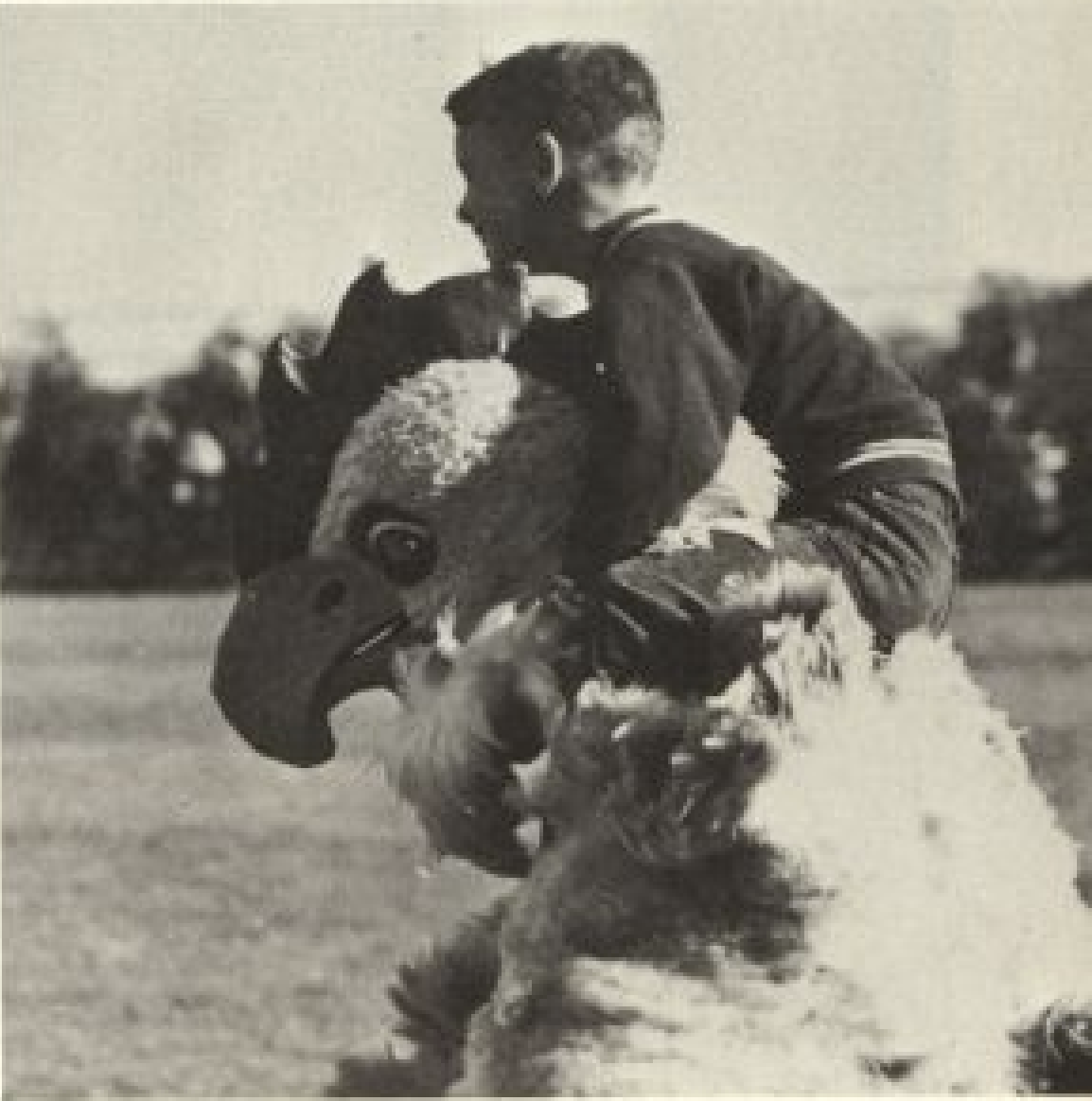
Blue Hen Yearbook, 1966

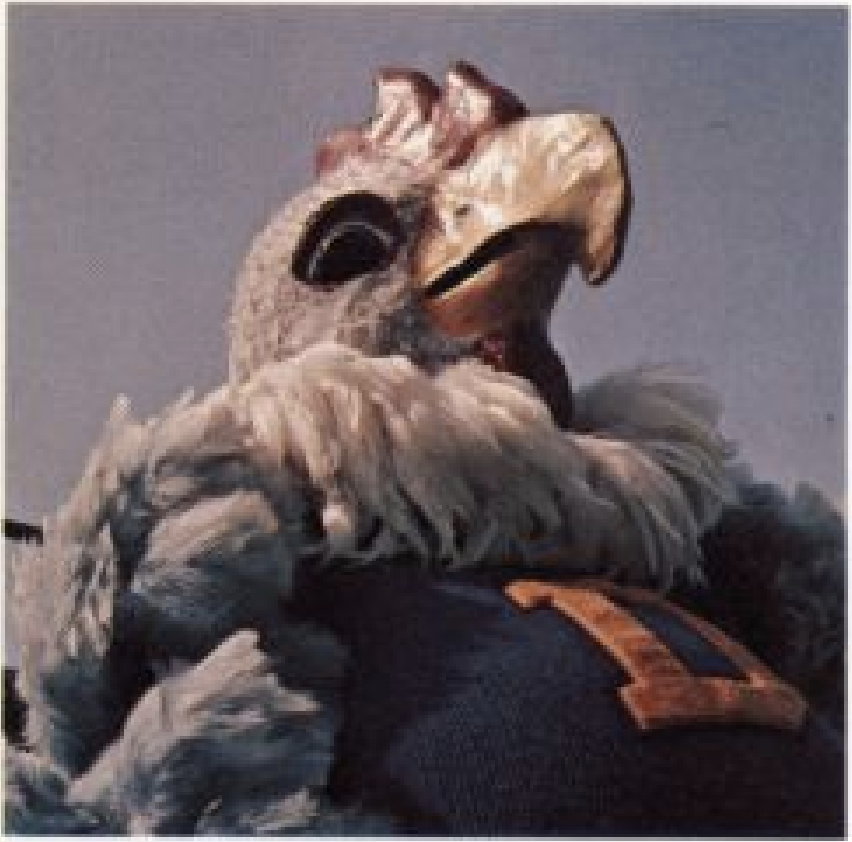
Blue Hen Yearbook, 1970

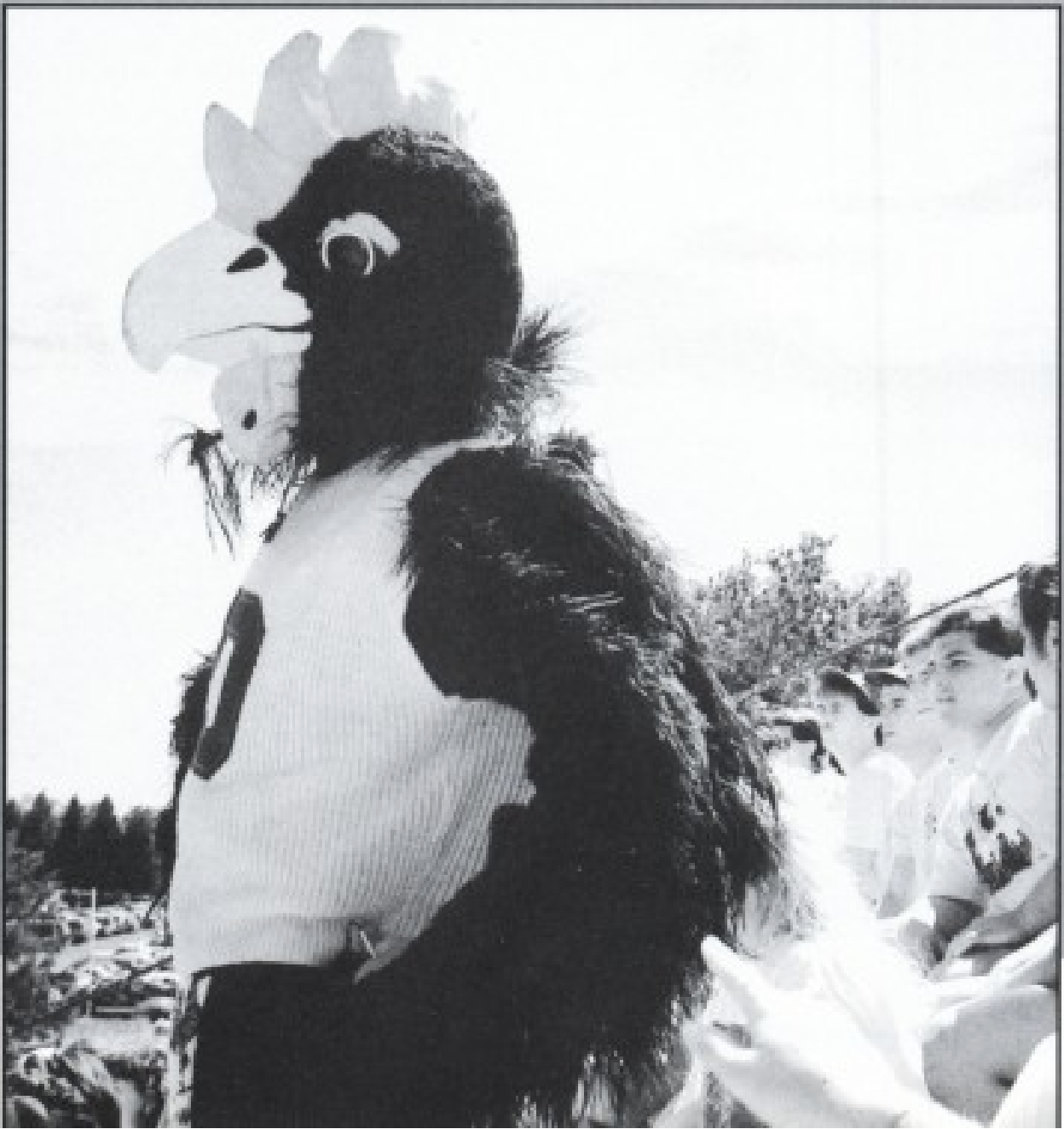
Blue Hen Yearbook, 1991

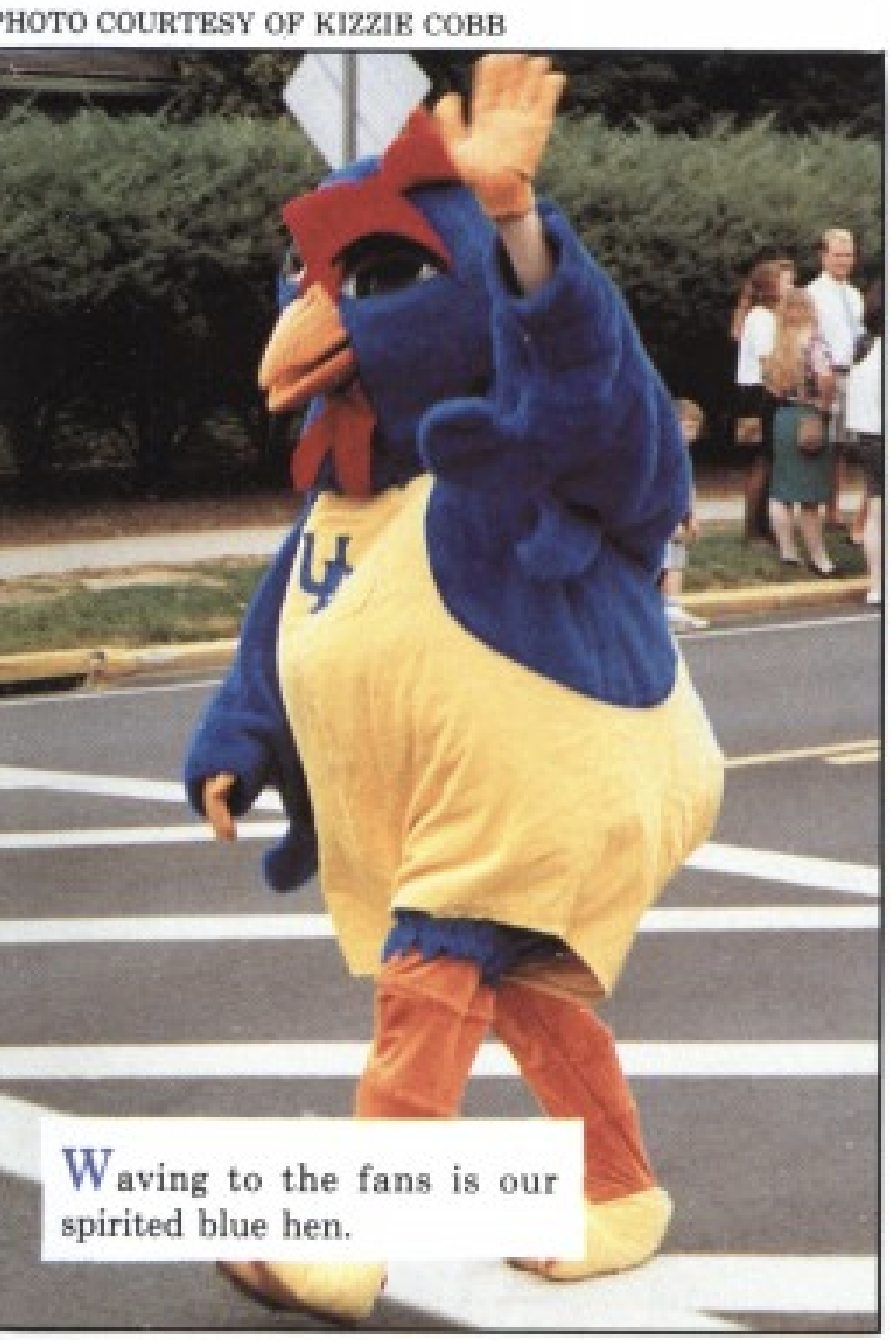
Blue Hen Yearbook, 1992

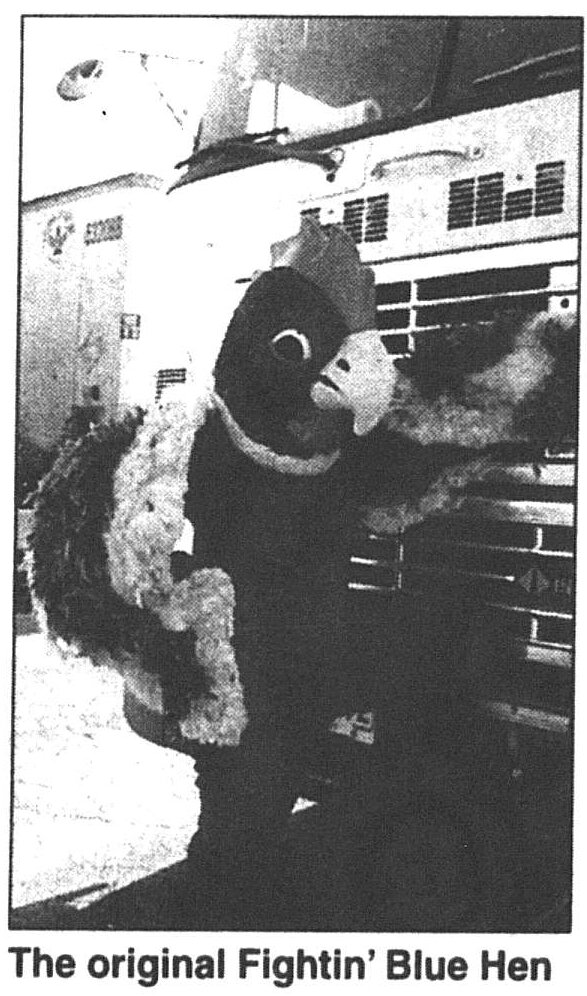
News Journal, published in 2003

A successor mascot would take its place. When the University of Delaware President David Roselle was questioned as to why there would be a new mascot, he said "[well], the obvious answer is, the old one wore out."

=== Hatching ===
YoUDee was first seen (or "hatched") at the Delaware-Lehigh football game in Delaware Stadium on September 4, 1993, after being created by Tom Sapp of Real Characters, Inc. (an Atlanta-based advertising agency.) Student performers were scouted to wear the costume. After two students applied and performed in tryouts, Robert Boudwin became the first performer of YoUDee. Boudwin worked to build YoUDee's personality and far-reaching image from "Delaware's infamous mascot" to "ass kickin' chickens." With help from David Raymond, the original Phillie Phanatic, the university mascot program has become a gateway to several professional mascot careers.

Chris Bruce, a 2002 graduate earned YoUDee its initial first-place finish. Brandon Williams, a 2003 graduate became the Baltimore Ravens mascot Poe. Other YoUDee alumni went on to perform Philadelphia Eagles' mascot Swoop, and Boudwin went on to perform as Clutch of the Houston Rockets.

Some controversy was aroused in November 1995 when YoUDee "mocked" middies (Midshipmen) at the United States Naval Academy. According to reports some time after the incident, the disturbance was YoUDee mooning Midshipmen, then attempting to carry away the academy's two goat statues. It is speculated that the act was part of some fraternity hazing requirement. Though, not everyone viewed this as mocking, as there were purportedly "many fans, both Navy and Delaware" that enjoyed the mascot's behavior and performance, both before and during the game.

YoUDee was "listed as one of the 16 worst college mascots in the nation" in a Newsweek issue in 1997. By those interviewed at the time, it is believed this designation was given because YoUDee is "unique" or "not tough enough." In contrast, in 2005, YoUDee was chosen to star in a nationwide ESPN News advertisement, and allegedly appeared on Wheel of Fortune, Hardball with Chris Matthews, and Good Day Philadelphia.

Another dispute was with concerns over a skit. In 2006, YoUDee would be carrying a cake, and a staff member would be displaying a sign that read "Happy Birthday Megan!" As the mascot climbed the stands, it would trip and crash into someone with the cake. Later on, the person covered in cake would be wearing a shirt that read "I got caked by [YoUDee.]" Sharon Harris, then Mascot Coordinator at the University of Delaware, in an interview said these skits were staged, and the person receiving the cake would always be a mascot team member.

=== Coaching ===
The program has been directed by Sharon Harris under the university's Office of Public Relations since about 1999 until summer of 2014 when the University Athletic Department took over the oversight of the mascot program. This aligned the Cheer, Dance and Mascot programs under one umbrella of Spirit Program. This was under new Spirit Coordinator Rob Ellery who oversaw the programs until summer of 2019 when Ryan Blandford took over. Ryan was in charge through summer of 2024 when current Spirit Coordinator and long-time assistant/All-Girl Head Coach Kirby Lynch took over the mantle.

After transition to Athletics in 2014, Chad Mills moved to the coach position where he served until 2016. From 2016 until 2021 there were various coaches, Tony Goldston, Abbie Martino and Kirby Lynch all had a hand in overseeing the team. Chad returned in 2021 and led the team through 2023. In summer of 2023, Tony Goldston a long-time assistant coach with spirit, took over the Head Coach position.

=== Hello, YoUDee! ===
Dana Davis made a children's book titled Hello, YoUDee! which was released and published in 2013 by Mascot Books. It follows YoUDee around the University of Delaware campus before going to the "stadium for the big game." While the licensed book refers to YoUDee with masculine pronouns, YoUDee has been "neither male or female" since 2004.

== Awards and recognition ==
On August 16, 2006, YoUDee was inducted into the NCAA Mascot Hall of Fame, at a ceremony in Philadelphia's Love Park. This was caused in large part by "YoUDee's fan leadership."

YoUDee has participated and won the Universal Cheerleader's Association (UCA) National Mascot Championship open division several times:

UCA National Championship
Year	Place	Source
2025	1st	
2024	2nd	
2023	1st	
2022	2nd	
2021	6th^{✝}	
2020	2nd	
2019	1st	
2018	2nd	
2017	1st	
2016	1st	
2015	2nd	
2014	2nd	
2013	1st	
2012	1st	
2011	1st	
2010	2nd	
2009	1st	
2008	5th	
2007	7th	
2006	4th	
2005	4th	
2004	3rd	
2003	8th	
2002	1st	
2001	4th	
2000	5th	
1999	2nd	

In 2002, YoUDee won first place in the entire UCA National Mascot Championship. It is likely in 2009, the mascot competition would be split into Mascot Division IA for mascots belonging to universities with Division I football (FBS) teams, and Open Mascot for all other mascots; YoUDee would compete in the latter. YoUDee won their first national championship in 2002 which was in the single division defeating teams that now compete in Division 1A. In 2009, YoUDee's second national championship was won in the Open Division, where they competed from 2009 to 2025. Starting in 2026, with the university's move to FBS and Conference USA, YoUDee will be competing in Mascot Division 1A.

YoUDee has also been named to Capital One All-America Mascot Team in 2003, as well as first place in several UCA Mascot summer camps.

Due to COVID-19, all mascots competed in one unified division. Previously, YoUDee has been competing in the Open Mascot division for several years.
