= Delaware Blue Hen =

Blue strain of fighting chicken

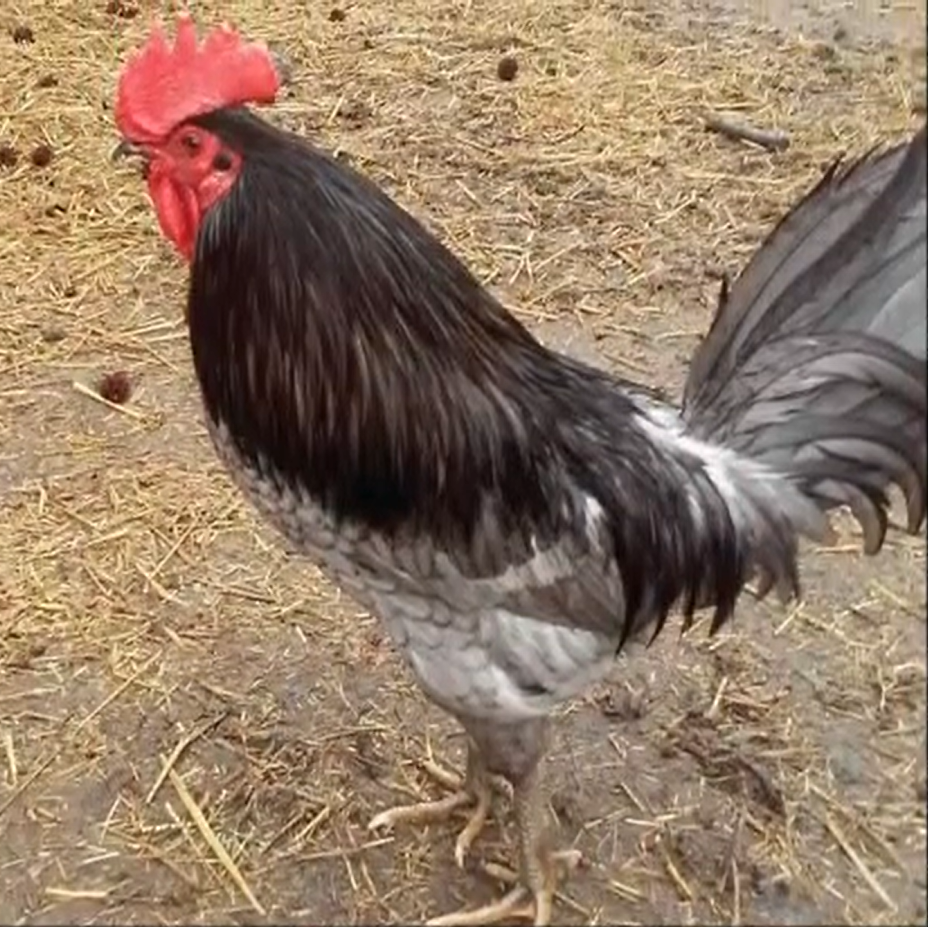
- A Delaware Blue Hen cock
- Other names: Blue Hen Chicken; Blue Hen of Delaware
- Country of origin: United States of America

Traits
- Weight: Male: 5 lb (2.5 kg); Female: 4 lb (2 kg)
- Comb type: single
- Color: blue

Classification

Notes
- official bird of the State of Delaware

The Delaware Blue Hen or Blue Hen of Delaware is a blue strain of American gamecock. Under the name Blue Hen Chicken it is the official bird of the State of Delaware. It is the emblem or mascot of several institutions in the state, among them the sports teams of the University of Delaware.

== History ==
The Blue Hen is not a recognized chicken breed. There are a number of different accounts of the origins of the Blue Hen name, which dates from 1775. According to one story, during the Revolutionary War, the men of the 2nd company of the 1st Delaware Regiment under Captain Jonathan Caldwell, recruited mostly in Kent County, took with them blue game chickens which acquired such a reputation for their fighting ability that the men also came to be known as "Blue Hen's Chickens"; another tale is that Caldwell had two gamecocks hatched from a certain blue hen, and that the men called themselves the "Sons of the Blue Hen". It is also possible that the men of the company acquired a nickname of this sort because their uniforms were reminiscent of the plumage of a fighting cock.

The Blue Hen Chicken was adopted as the official bird of the State of Delaware on April 14, 1939.

The sports teams of the University of Delaware are called the Blue Hens, and their mascot, YoUDee, derives from the bird. In the 1960s, S. Hallock duPont, who bred Blue Hens (though not derived from the original Kent County stock), gave twelve birds to the University, which keeps a small flock at its College of Agriculture & Natural Resources; in 2007 this numbered approximately forty birds.

The Blue Hen is also the emblem of the 166th Airlift Wing and its 142nd Airlift Squadron, stationed in Delaware.

== Characteristics ==
The birds kept by the University of Delaware have been cross-bred with birds of the Blue Andalusian breed from Spain, and have acquired many of its characteristics. They are Mediterranean in appearance, and no longer resemble the original fighting birds. The body is different in both shape and size, there is less gold coloration on the neck hackles, and the earlobes are white rather than the original red.

== See also ==
- List of Delaware state symbols
- List of U.S. state birds
