= University of Delaware =

Public university in Newark, Delaware, U.S.

Coordinates: 39°40′42″N 75°45′4″W

- Former names: Free School (1743–1765); Newark Academy (1765–1833); Newark College (1833–1843); Delaware College (1843–1921); Women's College of Delaware (1914–1921)
- Motto: Scientia Sol Mentis Est (Latin)
- Motto in English: "Knowledge is the light of the mind"
- Type: Privately governed, state-assisted land-grant research university
- Established: 1743; 283 years ago (officially chartered 1769; became a college 1833)
- Accreditation: MSCHE
- Academic affiliations: ORAU; sea-grant; space-grant
- Endowment: $2.06 billion (2025)
- President: Laura Carlson
- Provost: William Farquhar (interim)
- Faculty: 1,328 (fall 2023)
- Total staff: 4,895 (fall 2023)
- Students: 24,221 (fall 2023)
- Undergraduates: 18,812 (fall 2023)
- Postgraduates: 4,449 (fall 2023)
- Other students: 960 (fall 2023)
- Location: Newark, Delaware, United States
- Campus: 1,996 acres (808 ha); Large suburb
- Other campuses: Dover; Georgetown; Lewes; Wilmington
- Newspaper: The Review
- Colors: Blue and gold
- Nickname: Fightin' Blue Hens
- Sporting affiliations: NCAA Division I FBS – CUSA; ESCHL
- Mascot: YoUDee
- Website: udel.edu

The University of Delaware (UD, UDel, or Delaware) is a privately governed, state-assisted land-grant research university in Newark, Delaware, United States. UD offers 4 associate programs, 163 bachelor's programs, 136 master's programs, and 64 doctoral programs across its ten colleges and schools. The main campus is in Newark, with satellite campuses in Dover, Wilmington, Lewes, and Georgetown. With 24,221 students as of fall 2023, UD is the largest university in Delaware by enrollment.

UD is classified among "R1: Doctoral Universities – Very high research activity". According to the National Science Foundation, UD spent $186 million on research and development in 2018, ranking it 119th in the nation.

UD students, alumni, and sports teams are known as the "Fightin' Blue Hens", commonly shortened to "Blue Hens", and the school colors are Delaware blue and gold. UD sponsors 21 men's and women's NCAA Division I sports teams and have competed in the Coastal Athletic Association (CAA) since 2001 except for the men's hockey team which competes in the ESCHL. The university has left the CAA and subsequently joined Conference USA for the 2025–2026 academic year.

== History ==
=== Early years: Newark Academy ===
The University of Delaware traces its origins to 1743, when Presbyterian minister Francis Alison opened a "Free School" in his home in New London, Pennsylvania. During its early years, the school was run under the auspices of the Philadelphia Synod of the Presbyterian Church. The school changed its name and location several times. It moved to Newark by 1765 and received a charter from the colonial Penn government as the Academy of Newark in 1769. In 1781, the academy trustees petitioned the Delaware General Assembly to grant the academy the powers of a college but no action was taken on this request.

=== Transformation to Delaware College ===
In 1818, the Delaware legislature authorized the trustees of the Newark Academy to operate a lottery in order to raise funds with which to establish a college. Commencement of the lottery, however, was delayed until 1825, in large part because some trustees, several of whom were Presbyterian ministers, objected to involvement with a lottery on moral grounds.

In 1832, the academy trustees selected the site for the college and entered into a contract for the erection of the college building. Construction of that building (now called Old College) began in late 1832 or in 1833. In January 1833, the academy trustees petitioned the Delaware legislature to incorporate the college and on February 5, 1833, the legislature incorporated Newark College, which was charged with instruction in languages, arts, and sciences, and granted the power to confer degrees. All of the academy trustees became trustees of the college, and the college absorbed the academy, with Newark Academy becoming the preparatory department of Newark College.

Newark College commenced operations on May 8, 1834, with a collegiate department and an academic department, both of which were housed in Old College. In January 1835, the Delaware legislature passed legislation specifically authorizing the Newark Academy trustees to suspend operations and to allow the educational responsibilities of the academy to be performed by the academic department of Newark College. If, however, the college ever ceased to have an academic department, the trustees of the academy were required to revive the academy.

In 1843, the name of the college was changed to Delaware College.

The college was supported by a state authorized lottery until 1845. By the late 1840s, with the loss of lottery proceeds, the college faced serious financial problems. Although enrollment did increase to levels that would not be surpassed until the 1900s (there were 118 college students in 1854), the financial condition of the school deteriorated further. After a student fracas in 1858 resulted in the death of a student, the college suspended operations in 1859. The academy continued to operate.

=== Land-grant college ===
The American Civil War delayed the reopening of the college. In 1867, college trustees lobbied the Delaware legislature for Delaware College to be designated as Delaware's land-grant college pursuant to the Morrill Land-Grant College Act. On January 12, 1869, the board of trustees of Delaware College signed an agreement to become the state's land-grant institution. In exchange, the state received a one-half interest in the property of the college and the authority to appoint half of the members of the board of trustees. The Morrill Land-Grant College Act granted Delaware the title to 90,000 acres in Montana which it sold and invested the profits into bonds used to fund the college.

Delaware College's new status as a semipublic college led to the termination of its official connection with the private academy. In 1869, the Newark Academy was revived as a separate institution operating under the 1769 charter.

In 1870, Delaware College reopened. It offered classical, scientific and, as required by its land-grant status, agricultural courses of study. In an effort to boost enrollment, women were admitted to the college between 1872 and 1885.

In 1887, Congress passed the Hatch Act, which provided colleges and universities including Delaware College with funding with which to establish an agricultural experiment station. In 1890, the college purchased nine acres of land for an experimental farm next to its campus. In 1890, the college became the recipient of more federal aid when the New Morrill Act was passed. It provided for annual payments to support land-grant colleges. Under the law, the State of Delaware initially received $15,000 per year, which was to be increased by $1,000 per year until it reached $25,000. Delaware College received 80% of this money. (It did not receive all of it because the law provided that in states in which land-grant colleges did not admit black students, an equitable amount of the granted money had to be used to educate the excluded students. Delaware College had never admitted black students (although it had admitted Native American and Asian students), and as a result the state of Delaware established Delaware State College near Dover for black students, which opened in 1892.) In 1891 and 1893, Delaware College received appropriations from the state for the construction of new buildings. One new building built with this money was Recitation Hall.

As a result of this additional funding, Delaware College was invigorated. New buildings, improved facilities, and additional professors helped the college attract more students. Student life also became more active during this period. In 1889, the first football game involving a team representing the college was played. Also in 1889, the college adopted blue and gold as the school's colors.

In 1914, the Women's College of Delaware opened on an adjoining campus, offering women degrees in home economics, education, and arts and sciences. Brick archways at Memorial Hall separated the men's and women's campuses and gave rise to the legend of the "Kissing Arches" (where students would kiss good night before returning to their respective residence halls).

In 1921, Delaware College was renamed the University of Delaware. It officially became a coeducational institution in 1945 when it merged with the Women's College of Delaware.

The university grew rapidly during the latter half of the 20th century. After World War II, UD enrollment skyrocketed, thanks to the G.I. Bill. In the late 1940s, almost two-thirds of the students were veterans. Since the 1950s, UD has quadrupled its enrollment and greatly expanded its faculty, its academic programs, and its research enterprise.

In 2010–11, the university conducted a feasibility study in support of plans to add a law school focused on corporate and patent law. The study suggested that the planned addition was not within the university's funding capability given the nation's economic climate at the time. Capital expenses were projected at $100 million and the operating deficit in the first ten years would be $165 million. The study assumed an initial class of two hundred students entering in the fall of 2015. Widener University has Delaware's only law school.

=== Science, Technology and Advanced Research (STAR) Campus ===
On October 23, 2009, the University of Delaware signed an agreement with Chrysler to purchase a shuttered vehicle assembly plant adjacent to the university for $24.25 million as part of Chrysler's bankruptcy restructuring plan. The university has developed the 272-acre (1.10 km^{2}) site into the Science, Technology and Advanced Research (STAR) Campus. The site is the new home of UD's College of Health Sciences, which includes teaching and research laboratories and several public health clinics. The STAR Campus also includes research facilities for UD's vehicle-to-grid technology, as well as Delaware Technology Park, SevOne, CareNow, Independent Prosthetics and Orthotics, and the East Coast headquarters of Bloom Energy. In 2020, UD opened the Ammon Pinozzotto Biopharmaceutical Innovation Center, which became the new home of the UD-led National Institute for Innovation in Manufacturing Biopharmaceuticals. Chemours opened its global research and development facility, known as the Discovery Hub, on the STAR Campus in 2020. The new Newark Regional Transportation Center on the STAR Campus will serve passengers of Amtrak and regional rail.

== Campus ==
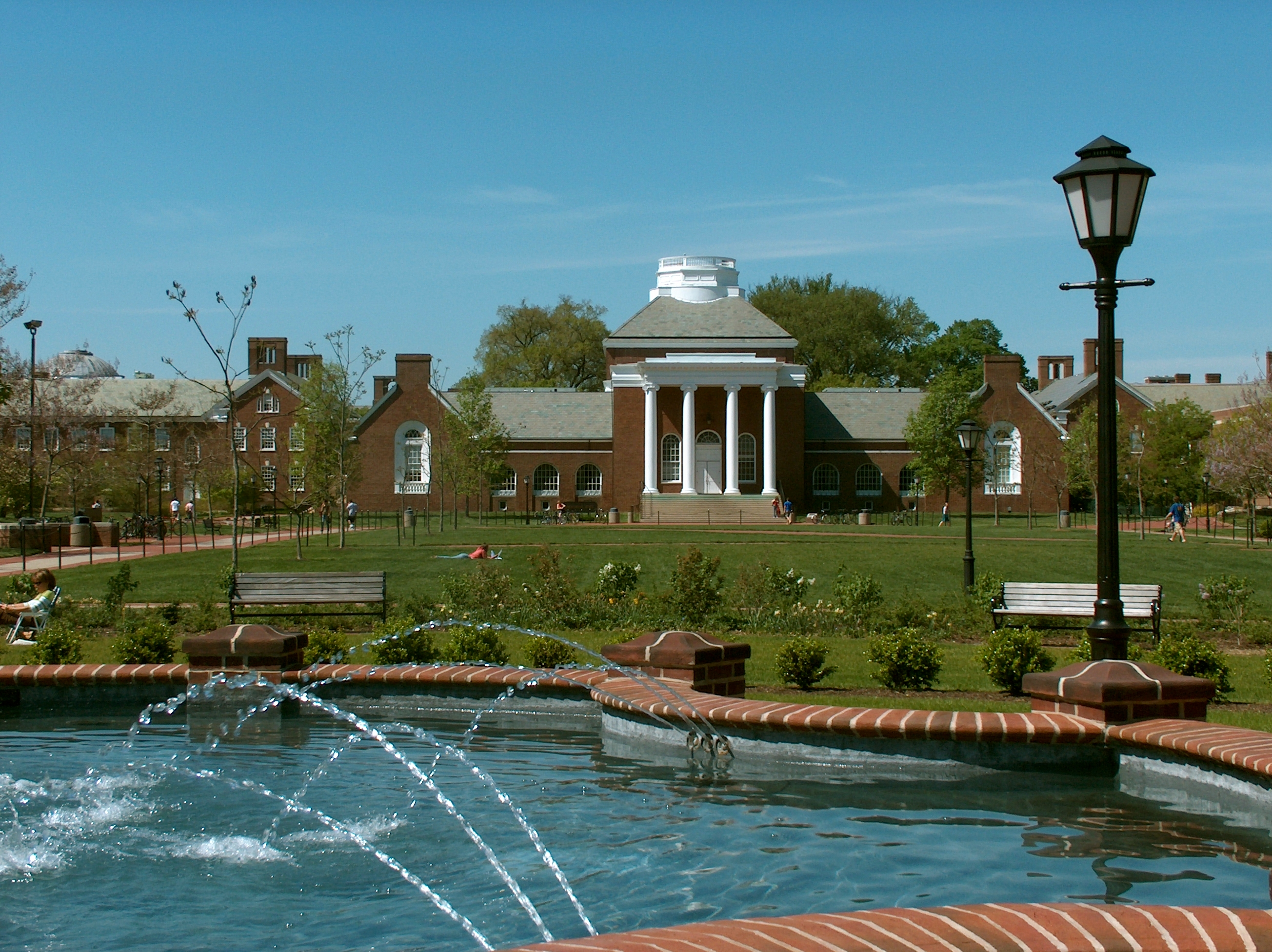
The south green with Memorial Hall in the background and Magnolia Circle in the foreground

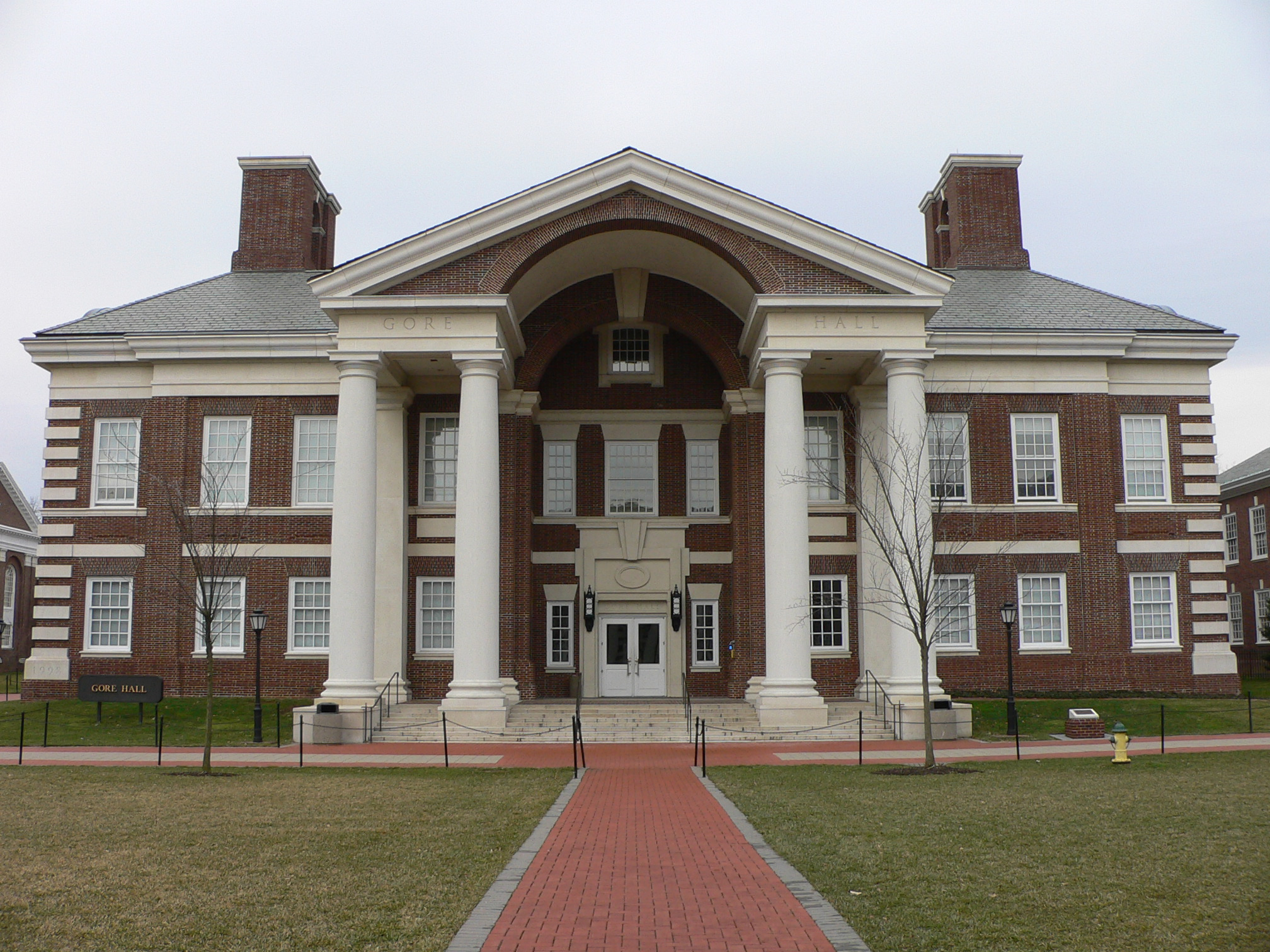
Gore Hall on the Green, Main Campus

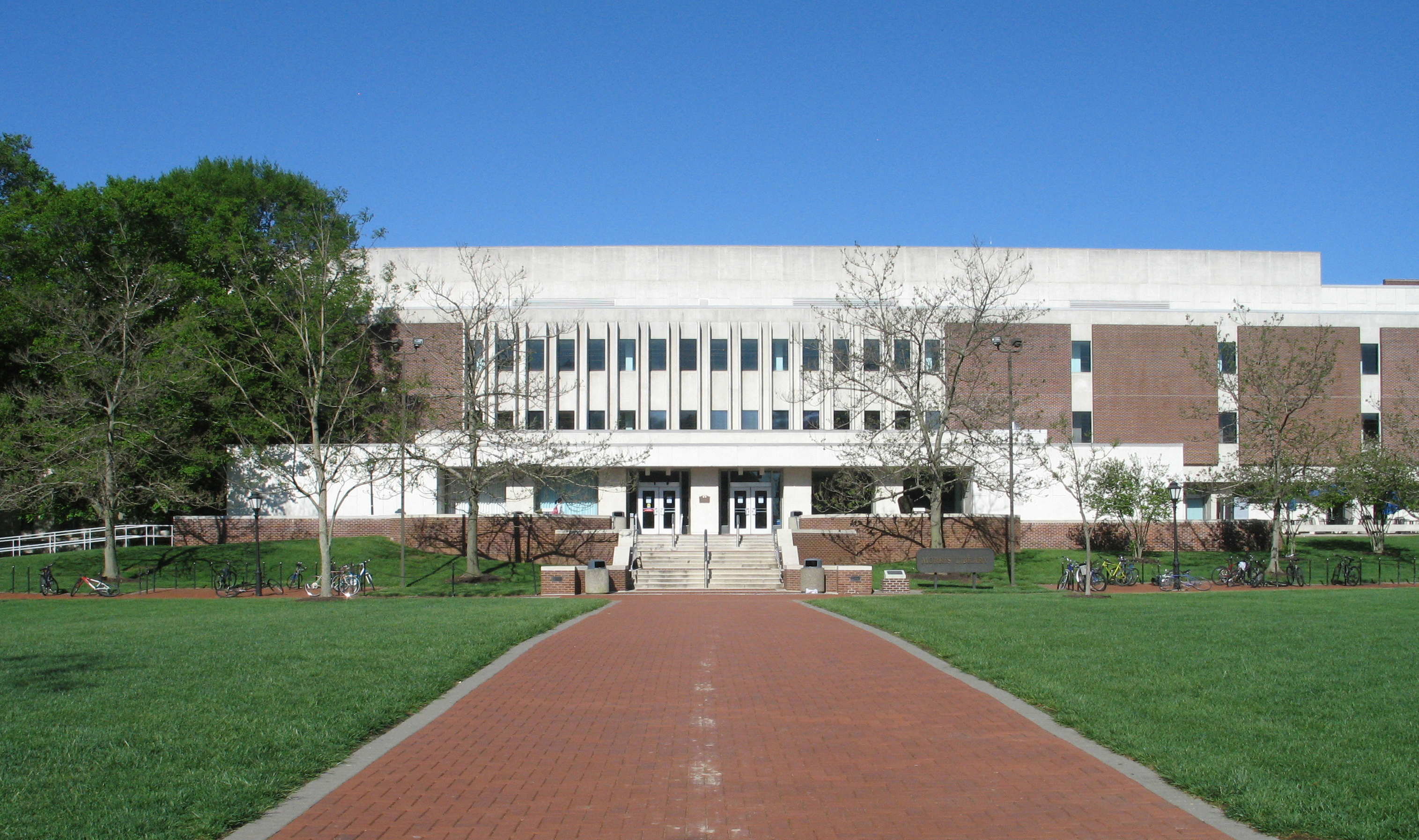
Morris Library, South Green

The campus itself is divided into four areas: Main, Laird, and South campuses, as well as the Delaware Technology Park.

Main Campus, which has most of the academic and residential buildings, is centered on a roughly north–south axis between South College Avenue and Academy Street. At the center of the campus is Memorial Hall, which once divided the Women's College from Delaware College. North and south of Memorial Hall is a large, roughly rectangular green space known either as "The Green" or "The Mall," around which are many of the oldest buildings on campus. Though the buildings were constructed at various times over the course of more than a century, they follow a cohesive Georgian design aesthetic. The Green area is further subdivided into three areas. "North Central," which is north of Delaware Avenue, contains the original men's dormitories (now co-educational) of what was then Delaware College, as well as several classroom buildings north of Main Street in what had been the original Engineering departments. "Central," which lies between Delaware Avenue and Memorial Hall, contains many large classroom buildings and laboratories. "South Central," which extends from Memorial Hall to Park Place, houses the original women's dormitories, as well as some classroom buildings and the Morris Library.

Laird Campus, which has several dormitories as well as a conference center, hotel, and the Christiana Towers apartment complex (currently closed), lies north of Cleveland Avenue between New London Road and North College Avenue. It is primarily residential. It is the former home to the Pencader Complex, which was demolished and replaced by three new residence halls. A total of four residence hall buildings have been built, three of which are named after the alumni who signed the Declaration of Independence, George Read, Thomas McKean, and James Smith, each of whom signed for Pennsylvania; the fourth residence hall is named Independence Hall. In addition, the construction of a Marriott Courtyard run by the Hospitality Business Management department expanded the campus.

South Campus has the agricultural school, all of the sports stadiums (including Delaware Stadium and the Bob Carpenter Center), and the Science, Technology and Advanced Research (STAR) Campus, which is built on the site of a former Chrysler vehicle assembly plant. It lies south of the Northeast rail corridor and north of Christina Parkway (Delaware Route 4).

The Delaware Technology Park, which lies to the far east of Main Campus, is located north of the train tracks, south of Wyoming Road, east of Library Avenue (Delaware Route 72) and west of Marrows Road and has several research laboratories, classroom buildings, and offices. The Children's Campus, located across the Library Avenue from the Delaware Technology Park, is a 15-acre site home to the Early Learning Center (ages 6 weeks to third grade), the Lab School (ages 6 months to kindergarten) and The College School (first to eighth grades). Also located on-site are UD's Cooperative Extension Master Gardeners Program and the Center for Disabilities Studies.

In 1891, prominent Philadelphia architect Frank Furness designed Recitation Hall. Several buildings (Wolf, Sussex, and Harter Halls) were designed by Frank Miles Day, who also designed the formal campus landscape. From 1918 to 1952, Marian Cruger Coffin was appointed the university's landscape architect, a position which required her to unite the university's two separate campuses (the men's to the north and the women's to the south) into one cohesive design. This was a challenge since the linear mall design of each was out of alignment with the other. Coffin solved this problem by linking them with a circle (now called Magnolia Circle) instead of curving the straight paths, which rendered the misalignment unnoticeable to the pedestrian.

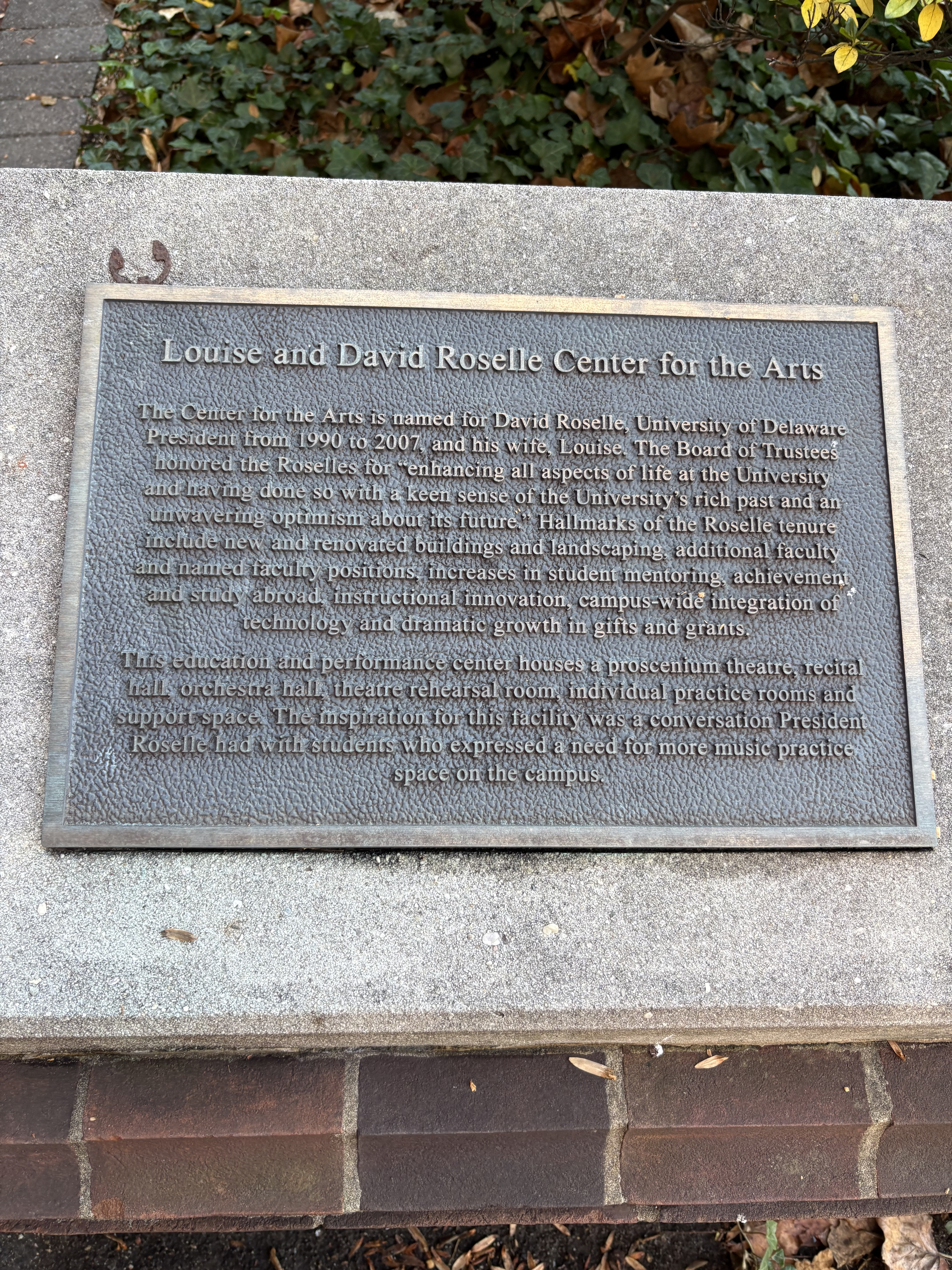
A plaque about and near the Louise and David Roselle Center for the Arts

Other major facilities that have opened since 2000 include:

- The Louise and David Roselle Center for the Arts, with facilities for the school's music and theater programs, was opened in 2006.
- In 2013, the Interdisciplinary Science and Engineering (ISE) Laboratory opened on the corner of Academy and Lovett streets. In 2015, it was named the Patrick T. Harker ISE Laboratory in honor of the university's 26th president.

== Organization and administration ==
On December 9th, 2025, the UD board of trustees elected Laura Carlson as the 29th president of the University of Delaware. She was previously selected as interim president following the resignation of former president, Dennis Assanis, in June 2025. Assanis succeeded Nancy Targett, former dean of the university's College of Earth, Ocean and Environment, who served as interim president in 2015–16. She was named 27th president of the university near the end of her service; she was the institution's first female president. Targett served after the departure of President Patrick Harker in 2015 to serve as the president of the Federal Reserve Bank of Philadelphia.

=== Tuition and funding ===
For the 2022–23 academic year, undergraduate tuition per semester was $14,822 for Delaware residents and $36,082 for non-residents. The total cost of attendance for the 2022–23 academic year (tuition, mandatory fees, room and board) was $32,444 for Delawareans and $54,964 for non-residents.

The university receives funding from a variety of sources as a consequence of its historical origins. Among those sources is the State of Delaware budget. In fiscal year 2020, 10% of the university's revenue came from government grants. Tuition, room, board, and fees were 57% of the university's total revenue.

The Delaware First fundraising and engagement campaign was the largest philanthropic campaign in UD history. Launched in November 2017, the campaign exceeded the goal of $750 million ahead of schedule and the university's administrators extended the goal to $1 billion in October 2021. The campaign concluded in June 2023 with a record-breaking 113,402 university supporters contributing more than $1.05 billion.

=== University services ===
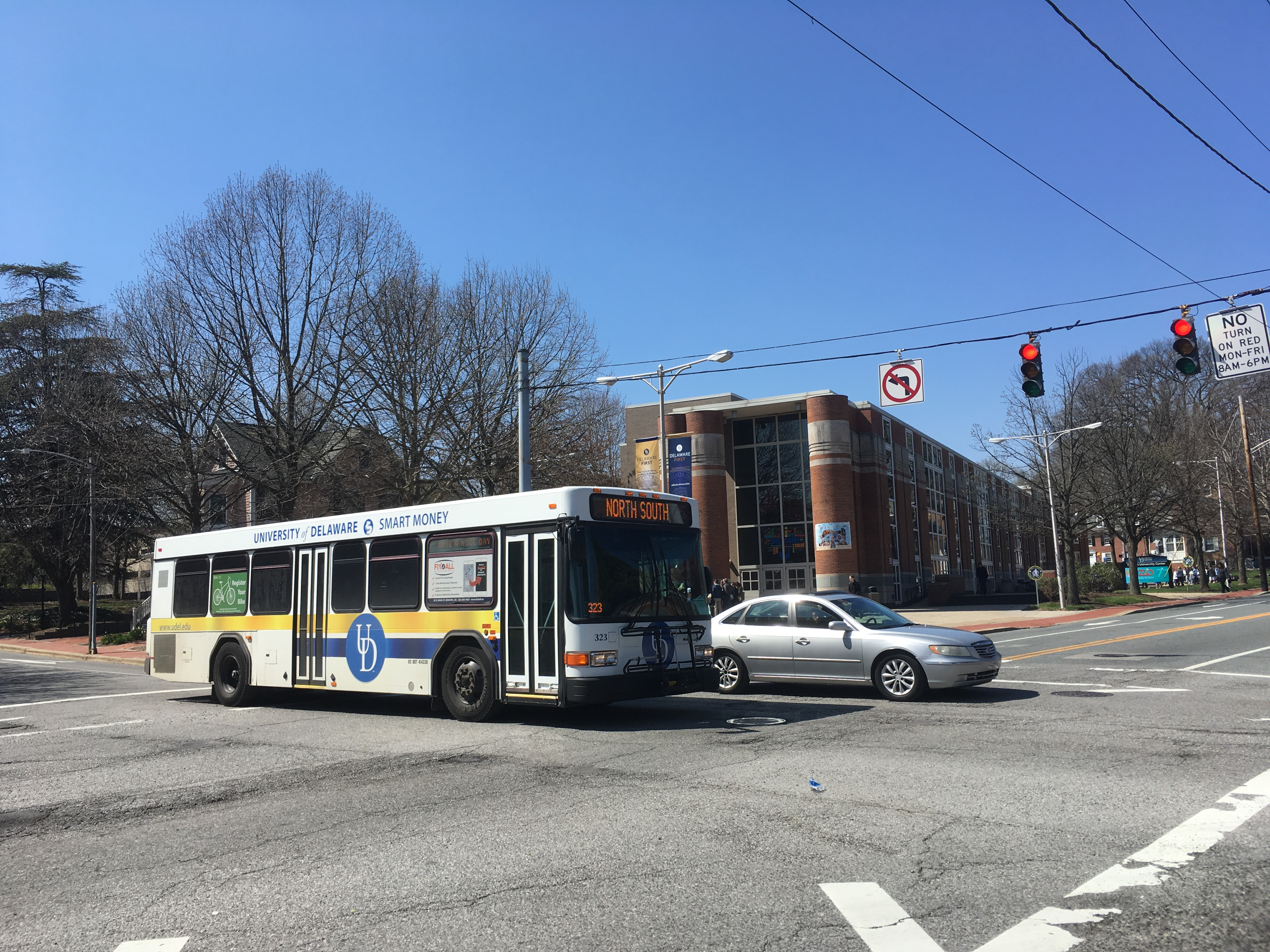
University of Delaware shuttle bus

The University of Delaware Emergency Care Unit (UDECU) is a registered student organization at the university, which provides emergency medical services to the campus and surrounding community. UDECU has approximately 50 members, all of which are volunteers and students at the University of Delaware. UDECU operates one basic life support ambulance (UD-1), one first response vehicle (UD-2), and a bike team. Advanced life support is provided by New Castle County Emergency Medical Services.

The University of Delaware Police Department is responsible for law enforcement on UD's three campuses. The police represent one branch of the University of Delaware Department of Public Safety, whose employees also include security officers, as well as dispatchers, EMTs, and Police Cadets.

== Academics ==
The university offers more than 150 undergraduate degree programs and, due to the number of academic options, many students complete dual degrees as well as double majors and minors. UD students have access to work and internship opportunities, worldwide study abroad programs, research and service learning programs.

=== Undergraduate admissions ===
Undergraduate admissions statistics
- 2021 entering class
- Admit rate: 72.7 (▲ +7.8)
- Yield rate: 18.7 (▼ −6.2)

Test scores middle 50%
- SAT Total: 1170-1350 (among 60% of FTFs)
- ACT Composite: 26-31 (among 11% of FTFs)

The student body at the University of Delaware is primarily an undergraduate population. For the Class of 2028 (enrolled fall 2024), Delaware received 37,472 applications and accepted 23,818 (63.5%). The university is need-blind for domestic applicants. Of those accepted, 4,617 enrolled, a yield rate (the percentage of accepted students who choose to attend the university) of 18.7%. Delaware's freshman retention rate is 91.5%, with 83.6% going on to graduate within six years.

Of the 60% of the incoming freshman class who submitted SAT scores; the middle 50 percent Composite scores were 1170–1350. Of the 11% of enrolled freshmen in 2021 who submitted ACT scores; the middle 50 percent Composite score was between 26 and 31. In the 2020–2021 academic year, 2 freshman students were National Merit Scholars.

=== Rankings ===
Academic rankings

National
- Forbes: 127
- U.S. News & World Report: 86 (tie)
- Washington Monthly: 111
- WSJ/College Pulse: 86

Global
- ARWU: 201–300
- QS: =553
- THE: 401–500
- U.S. News & World Report: 352 (tie)

USNWR graduate school rankings (as of 2020)
Business	99–131
Education	45
Engineering	47

USNWR departmental rankings (as of 2020)
Biological Sciences	140
Chemistry	59
Clinical Psychology	36
Computer Science	68
Criminology	15
Earth Sciences	78
Engineering	58
English	77
Fine Arts	157
History	91
Mathematics	74
Physical Therapy	1
Physics	71
Political Science	81
Psychology	66
Public Affairs	39
Sociology	63

The university was ranked 352nd (tie) globally according to U.S. News & World Report's 2023 rankings. The university was ranked between 401st and 500th globally according to Times Higher Education World University Rankings in 2024.

The U.S. News & World Report ranked the University of Delaware's engineering graduate program as #47 for 2022 and the undergraduate program as #53 for 2021. U.S. News & World Report ranked the undergraduate chemical engineering program #7 in the country for 2021 and the graduate chemical engineering programs as #8 in the country for 2022.

=== Colleges and schools ===
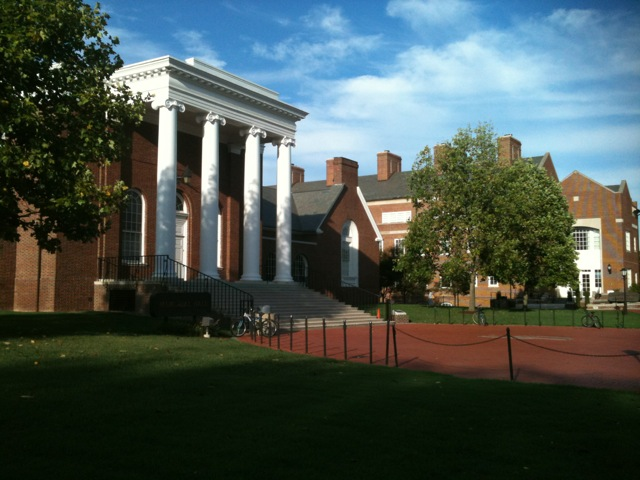
Memorial Hall, home of UD's English Department

The university is organized into ten colleges:

- College of Agriculture and Natural Resources
- College of Arts and Sciences
  - School of Music
- Alfred Lerner College of Business and Economics
- College of Earth, Ocean and Environment
- College of Education and Human Development
- College of Engineering
- College of Health Sciences
  - School of Nursing
- Graduate College
- Honors College
- Joseph R. Biden, Jr. School of Public Policy and Administration

The Alfred Lerner College of Business and Economics offers bachelor's, master's, and doctoral degree programs across seven departments: accounting and MIS, business administration, economics, finance, hospitality business management, sport management, and enterprise. As the second largest of UD's eight colleges, Lerner includes 3,368 undergraduate students, 872 graduate students, 209 faculty and staff (2019 statistics), and more than 34,000 alumni across the globe.

The College of Agriculture and Natural Resources offers bachelor's, master's and doctoral degree programs across four departments: animal and food sciences, entomology and wildlife ecology, plant and soil sciences, and applied economics and statistics. As of fall 2019, the College of Agriculture and Natural Resources had 81 faculty, 892 undergraduate students and 212 graduate students. The college includes a 350-acre outdoor classroom in Newark that includes a dairy farm, equine barns, statistics and experimental economics labs, botanic gardens, greenhouses, ecology woods, an apiary, farmland, forests, grasslands, wetlands, and a creamery.

The College of Arts and Sciences has 23 academic departments. It is the largest of UD's colleges, with 6358 undergraduate students, 1132 graduate students and more than 600 faculty members, as of fall 2019. The College of Arts and Sciences includes one of six undergraduate programs in Art Conservation in North America.

The College of Earth, Ocean and Environment is made up of the Department of Geography and Spatial Sciences, the Department of Earth Sciences, and the School of Marine Science and Policy. There are four programs in the School of Marine Science and Policy: Marine Biosciences, Oceanography, Physical Ocean Science and Engineering, and Marine Policy. The college offers over nine undergraduate majors, 17 graduate degrees and two professional certificates. Fall 2019 enrollment included 397 undergraduate students and 183 graduate students.

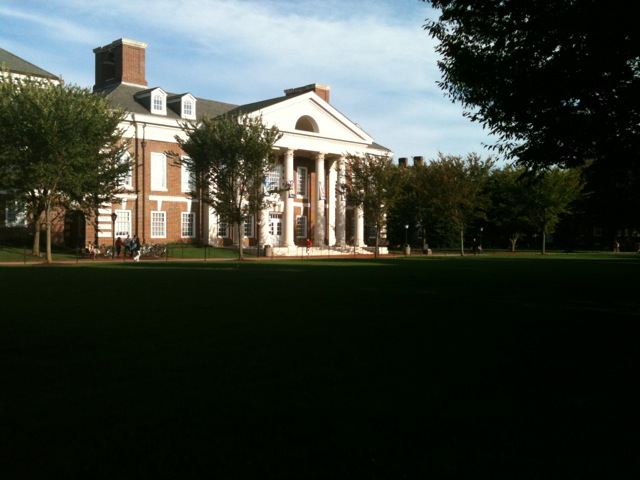
Dupont Hall on the Central Green, College of Engineering

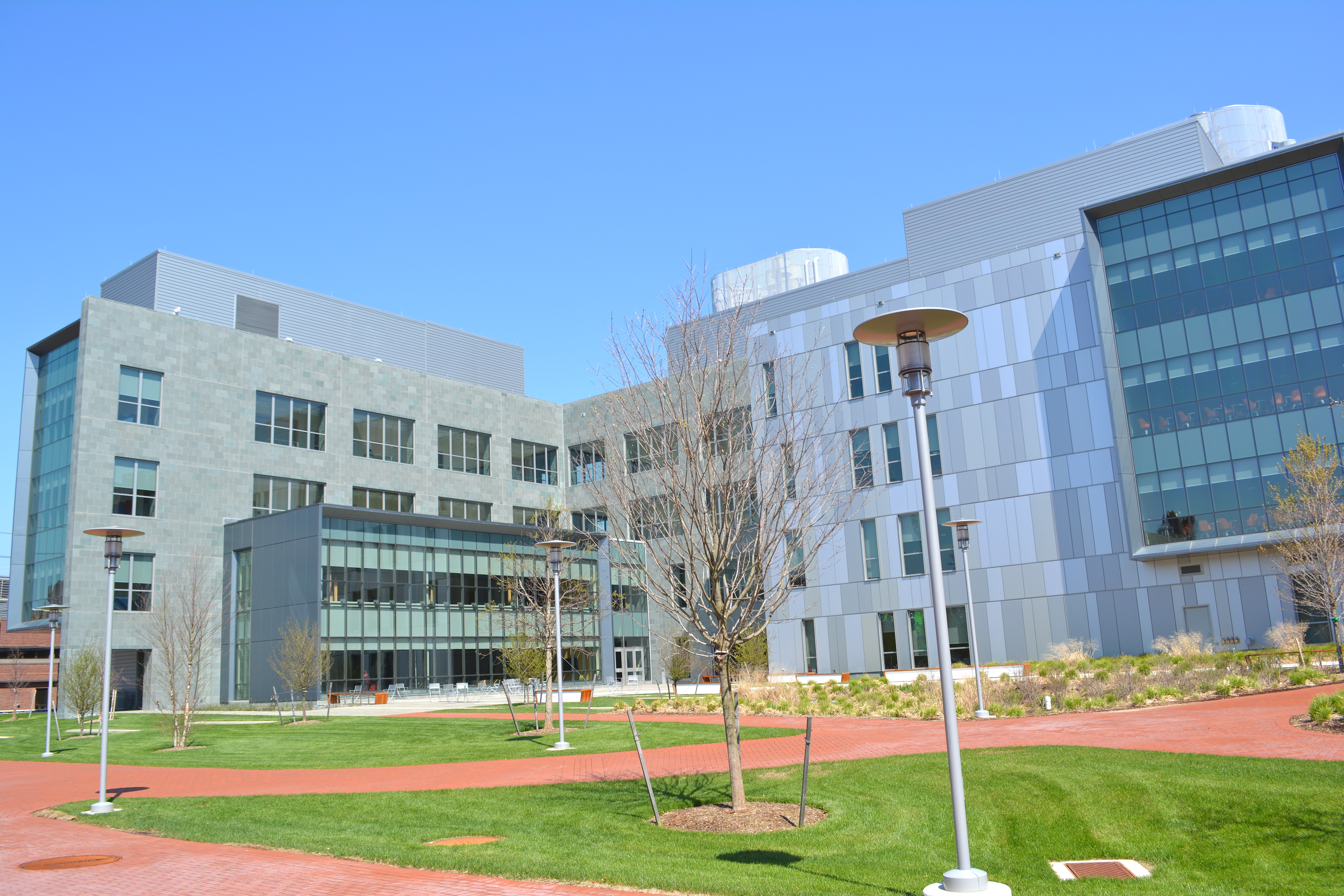
Interdisciplinary Science and Engineering Laboratory

The College of Engineering is home to seven academic departments offering bachelor's degree, master's degree and doctoral degree programs. Areas of research focus include advanced manufacturing and materials, coastal and environmental engineering, translational biomechanics, engineered therapeutics and scholarship of engineering education. Undergraduate degrees are offered in biomedical engineering, chemical engineering, civil engineering, computer engineering, computer science, construction engineering and management, electrical engineering, environmental engineering, information systems, materials science and engineering, and mechanical engineering. As of fall 2019, the College of Engineering had 177 full-time faculty, 2,492 undergraduate students and 927 graduate students.

The College of Health Sciences is home to seven academic departments, including newly created Epidemiology. The College of Health Sciences offers bachelor's degree, master's degree and doctoral degree programs that take evidence-based research and translate it into person-centered care. Undergraduate degrees are offered in applied molecular biology and biotechnology, exercise science, health behavioral science, medical diagnostics, medical laboratory science, nursing, nutrition, nutrition and dietetics, nutrition and medical sciences, and sports health. Pre-physician's assistant and occupational therapy tracks are also available. As of fall 2019, the College of Health Sciences included 148 faculty, 2,715 undergraduate students and 504 graduate students.

The first doctoral programs at UD–in chemical engineering and chemistry–were approved in 1946. The university awarded its first doctorate — in chemical engineering — in 1948. Currently, more than 3,600 graduate students are enrolled at UD. The university offers more than 200 graduate and professional degree programs.

=== Institutes ===
The Institute of Energy Conversion at the University of Delaware is the oldest solar energy research institute in the world. It was established by Karl Boer in 1972 to pioneer research on thin film solar cells and today is one of the only laboratories in the world with expertise in Si, CdTe, and CuInSe2 based solar cells. This included the development of one of the first solar powered homes, a structure still utilized by the university's student-run ambulance service, the University of Delaware Emergency Care Unit. Recently the IEC was the number one recipient of the DOE Sunshot Initiative and was awarded 5 grants totaling $9.1 million to research next generation solar cells to reduce the cost of solar cells by 75% by the end of the decade.

The Delaware Environmental Institute launched on October 23, 2009. DENIN is charged with conducting research and promoting and coordinating knowledge partnerships that integrate environmental science, engineering and policy.

The University of Delaware Energy Institute was inaugurated September 19, 2008. UDEI has been selected to receive a $3 million a year grant for advanced solar research.

The John L. Weinberg Center for Corporate Governance was established in 2000 at the Alfred Lerner College of Business and Economics. Its aim is to propose changes in corporate structure and management through education and interaction. The Center provides a forum for those interested in corporate governance issues.

In February 2017, the School of Public Policy and Administration announced the creation of the Joseph R. Biden, Jr. Institute (Biden Institute), named after alumnus Joe Biden, the 46th president of the United States, who at the time had recently finished his term as the 47th vice president.

=== Study abroad ===
The University of Delaware was the first American university to begin a formal, for-credit study-abroad program, which was later adopted by many other institutions. The program began when Professor Raymond Watson Kirkbride took a group of eight students to Paris, France, during the fall semester of 1923. Since this initial trip, the University of Delaware has expanded its study-abroad program, which now encompasses more than 40 countries. About one-third of UD undergraduate students take advantage of study-abroad experiences prior to completing their bachelor's degrees.

== Student life ==
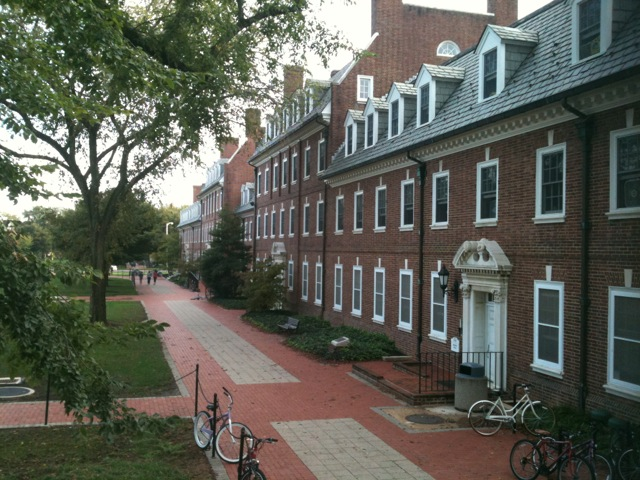
Brown and Sypherd Hall residence halls on the North Green

Undergraduate demographics as of Fall 2023
Race and ethnicity	Total
White	67%
Hispanic	10%
Asian	6%
Black	6%
Two or more races	5%
International student	4%
Unknown	2%
Economic diversity
Low-income (Note: The percentage of students who received an income-based federal Pell grant intended for low-income students.)	16%
Affluent (Note: The percentage of students who are a part of the American middle class at the bare minimum.)	84%

=== Music ===
The University of Delaware has a variety of musical performance opportunities available to students, including a wind ensemble, orchestra, and jazz and symphonic band. There are also a number of jazz groups available, including two large ensembles, and a smaller group that focus on improvisation. All ensembles are open by audition to all students at the university, and can be taken either for credit or for no credit. The school also has a steel drum ensemble, and an early music ensemble. There are also a variety of choral ensembles, including the University of Delaware Chorale, an all-women's choir, and three choirs, also open to community members, that constitute the Schola Cantorum. The music department's home is the Amy E. du Pont Music Building, named for Amy Elizabeth du Pont, a prominent benefactor of the university during the 20th century.

In addition, the University of Delaware has a marching band, the University of Delaware Fightin' Blue Hen Marching Band. The band ranges from 300 to 350 members every year and can be seen performing at every home football game as well as at various festivals and competitions, including the Collegiate Marching Band Festival in Allentown. Additionally, the marching band was selected to perform in the 56th presidential inaugural parade in 2009.

In 2006, the new Center for the Arts building opened. This building has a number of recital halls and a large number of practice rooms, most with upright pianos. The practice rooms are locked and cannot be used by students who are not music majors or in an official UD ensemble. The university employs a tiered access system, with larger rooms and rooms with grand pianos being reserved for certain groups of students. In addition the music department also uses their old building, with offices, classrooms, practice rooms, and recital halls. This building has public-access practice rooms with pianos.

In 2005, the University of Delaware Chorale, under the direction of Paul D. Head and accompanied by Betsy Kent, were invited to perform at the American Choral Directors Association's International Convention in Los Angeles. In April 2007, the Chorale won the Grand Prix at the Tallinn International Choral Festival in Estonia, having scored higher than 40 other choirs from around the world. In 2010 the Chorale competed in two categories of the 42nd Annual Tolosa Choral Competition in Tolosa, Spain; they received a Bronze and a Silver award. UD-16, a chamber ensemble of Chorale, also competed in Tolosa in two categories and won two Silver awards. In the Summer of 2012 the Chorale was the only American College Choir to be invited to the International Society for Music Education Conference in Thessaloniki, Greece; the UD Steele Ensemble was also invited. On that same tour, the chorale placed in a close second at the Grand Prix of the 25th Bela Bartok International Choral Competition. In 2000, the music department purchased an 18th-century Ceruti violin for professor and violinist Xiang Gao.

In December 2019, the Department of Music in the College of Arts and Sciences was officially renamed the School of Music to Calculus .

The university also has a student run radio station, 91.3 WVUD, as well as several a cappella groups including one all-female, one all-male, and five mixed groups, several of which compete regularly at the International Championship of Collegiate A Cappella (ICCA). The most successful group is Vocal Point, who placed third at ICCA finals in 2014. In 2020, The A Cappella Archive ranked UD Vocal Point at No. 12 all-time among ICCA-competing groups.

In addition, the University of Delaware currently has two music fraternities: Phi Mu Alpha for men and Sigma Alpha Iota for women. Both organizations are active in the music community; hosting a variety of recitals and service events in and around the Newark area.

=== Media ===
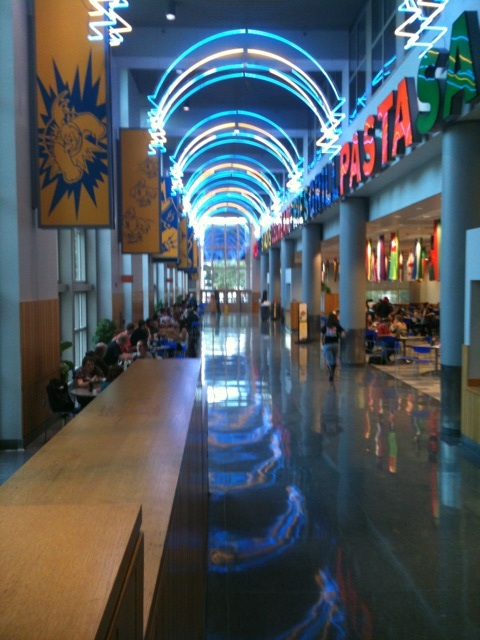
Trabant University Center

There are currently two student publications at Delaware, The Review and UDress, as well as radio and television stations.

==== Print ====
The Review is a weekly student publication, released in print and online on Tuesdays. It is an independent publication and receives no financial support from the university. It is distributed at several locations across campus, including Morris Library, the Perkins Student Center and the Trabant University Center, as well as various academic buildings and the dining halls. The Review's office is located at 250 Perkins Student Center, facing Academy Street, and is above the offices of WVUD. In 2004, it was a National Newspaper Pacemaker Award Finalist, and was named one of the ten best non-daily college newspapers by the Associated Collegiate Press. It currently has a print circulation of 10,000.

UDress magazine is the on-campus fashion magazine, which publishes one issue per semester, in conjunction with fashion events.

==== Broadcast ====
The student-run, non-commercial, educational radio station at Delaware broadcasts on 91.3 and uses the call letters WVUD, which the university purchased from the University of Dayton in the 1980s. Although not its intended call letter pronunciation, 'VUD has taken on the slogan "the Voice of the University of Delaware." They are licensed to the city of Newark, Delaware and broadcasts with a power of 1,000 watts 24 hours a day with its offices and studios located in the Perkins Student Center.

The transmitting facilities are located atop the Christiana East Tower residence hall. WVUD is operated by University of Delaware students, a university staff of two, and community members. No prior radio experience is necessary, nor is there a need to enroll in any certain major to become a part of WVUD. The radio station has a variety of programming, featuring both music and talk formats.

STN is the student-run, non-commercial, educational television station at the University of Delaware. The station broadcasts second-run movies and original student-produced content as well as live sports coverage. The initials "STN" originally stood for Shane Thomas Network and was later changed to Student Television Network.

=== Fraternities and sororities ===
Approximately 30% of the University of Delaware's undergraduate student population is affiliated with a fraternity or sorority. There are over 29 fraternities and 20 sororities (chapters and colonies) in the Interfraternity Council (IFC), National Panhellenic Conference (NPC), Multicultural Greek Congress (MGC) and Special Interest Greek Council.

=== Alcohol use ===
A campus website claims that a 1993 study by the Harvard School of Public Health found that high-risk drinking at UD exceeded the national norm. On this survey, a majority of students reported binge drinking more than once in two weeks. The average consumption for students was nine drinks per week, while 29% reported that they drink on 10 or more occasions per month. UD students were found to be more aware of policies, prevention programs, and enforcement risks than the national average.

In 2005, on the Newark campus of the university 1140 students were picked up by the campus police for alcohol-related violations. Of these, 120 led to arrests. These figures are up from previous years, 1062 in 2004 and 1026 in 2003. This represents approximately 6% of the student population. At least one student organization has undertaken the goal of "providing fun activities for those who chose not to drink" and to "promote the idea that one doesn't need alcohol to have a good time."

In 2008, a University of Delaware freshman died of alcohol poisoning after attending a party hosted by members of the Sigma Alpha Mu fraternity, where the student was pledging. A student visiting from another college died on March 19, 2016, in an alcohol-related incident.

== Athletics ==
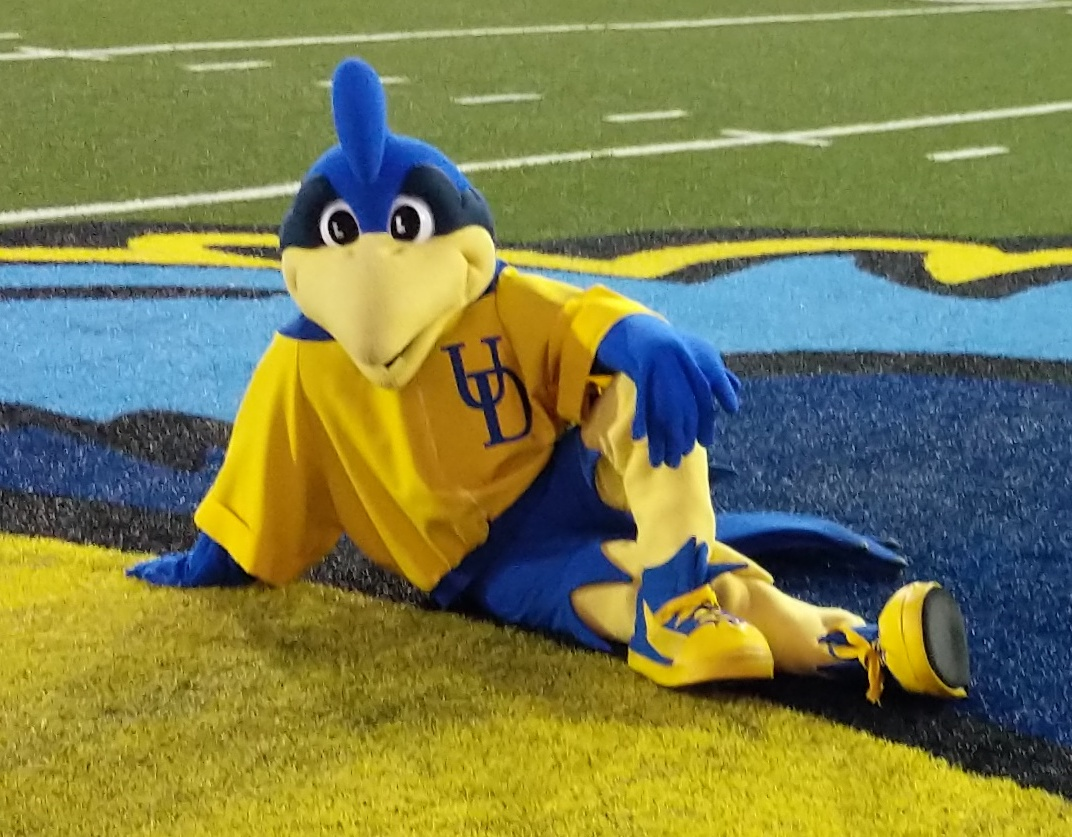
YoUDee is the mascot of the Delaware Fightin' Blue Hens.

The athletic teams at Delaware are known as the Fightin' Blue Hens, with a mascot named YoUDee. YoUDee is a Blue Hen Chicken, after the team names and the state bird of Delaware. YoUDee was elected into the mascot hall of fame in 2006, and is an eight-time UCA Open Division Mascot National Champion.

UD offers 21 varsity sports, which compete in NCAA Division I. Delaware is currently a member of the Coastal Athletic Association (CAA) in non-football sports and the CAA's technically separate football league, CAA Football. In July 2024, UD was scheduled to start a transition to the top level of college football, Division I FBS, and will join Conference USA a year later. Delaware was a member of the Atlantic 10 Conference in football until the 2006 season. The Fightin' Blue Hens football teams have won six national titles, including the 2003 NCAA I-AA Championship. In 2007, the Delaware Blue Hens were the runners up in the NCAA I-AA National Championship game, but were defeated by defending champions Appalachian State. In 2010, the Delaware Blue Hens were again runners up in the National Championship game, losing to Eastern Washington 20–19 after being up 19–0 earlier in the game.

Delaware's long serving Director of Athletics from 1984 to 2009, Edgar N. Johnson was a UD swim and track coach who swam for Delaware from 1962 to 1966. During his tenure, he oversaw construction of a new basketball venue, the Bob Carpenter Center, Delaware's first artificial surface facility at Rullo Stadium, and major renovations of Delaware Stadium, Delaware Field House, and Carpenter Sports Building. In his honor, the Edgar Johnson Award is given each year to the University of Delaware senior male athlete who best exhibits the characteristics of dedication, hard work, and fairness, and consistently reaches for excellence. During his tenure, his teams were awarded 10 consecutive America East Commissioner's Cup Awards, won a total of 83 titles in their conferences, and appeared in 32 NCAA Championships.

Former head football coaches Bill Murray, Dave Nelson, and Harold "Tubby" Raymond are College Football Hall of Fame inductees. Delaware is one of only two schools to have three straight head coaches inducted into the College Football Hall of Fame (Georgia Tech is the other).

The Blue Hens have won 29 CAA championships since joining in 2001:

CAA championships
Team	Number	Years
Women's field hockey	12	2004, 2009, 2013, 2014, 2015, 2016, 2017, 2019, 2020, 2021, 2022, 2024
Men's soccer	5	2012, 2013, 2014, 2015, 2016
Women's volleyball	5	2007, 2008, 2010, 2011, 2023
Women's basketball	3	2012, 2013, 2022
Men's lacrosse team	5	2007, 2010, 2011, 2022, 2023
Women's track and field	2	2014, 2019
Women's golf	3	2015, 2016, 2023
Men's basketball team	2	2014, 2022
Football	1	2010 (co-champions with William & Mary)

Unofficially, the women's rowing team has won the CAA title four times since 2001, placing second the other two times. The 2007 men's lacrosse program reached the final four of the NCAA Tournament for the first time in its history.

On March 7, 2012, the Division 1 men's ice hockey team (a non-varsity team) won the ACHA National Championship. UD defeated Oakland University 5–1, capturing its first title.

"The Delaware Fight Song" first appeared in the Student Handbook in 1933. It was composed by alumnus George F. Kelly (Class of 1915).

=== Intrastate competition ===
In November 2007, it was announced that the University of Delaware and Delaware State University would have their first game against each other, the game being in the first round of the NCAA Division I Football Championship Subdivision playoffs. The game was played on November 23, with University of Delaware winning 44–7. Delaware has won all of the regular season match-ups, which have been called the Route 1 Rivalry. In all, the two schools played eleven games between 2007 and 2022. In 2019, UD and DSU announced that they have scheduled six games against each other from 2024 through 2030, including the first two games at DSU's Alumni Stadium.

== Controversies ==
=== Handling of violence ===
In October 2021, a sophomore male student was accused of assaulting a female student in an off-campus apartment, allegedly having held her captive there for about four hours after choking her unconscious and threatening to kill her. This all happened before throwing her down a flight of stairs. Although he was later arrested on assault, kidnapping, and other charges, and suspended from the university and barred from its campus, many students protested the perceived inaction by the university, which took five days to issue a statement about the incident.

The university's lack of a timely response was also highlighted by a student in 2019 who protested after the Title IX process was extended to 100 days instead of the mandated 60 days.

=== Orientation ===
In the fall of 2007, the university implemented a new residence-life education program that was criticized for forcing students into polarizing discussions. The program was abandoned in November of the same year.

=== Power plant ===
The university agreed to lease 43 acres on the STAR campus to The Data Centers (TDC) for the construction of the data center. The data center plan included a combined heat cycle natural gas-fired power plant capable of generating 248 megawatts of power. TDC claimed that the power plant was critical to ensuring an uninterrupted electrical power supply to the facility, which is critical for data integrity. The TDC business plan also called for sale of excess electricity. Portions of the Newark community questioned the business plan, claiming that the power plant is not an auxiliary part of the data center but a separate industrial use, which would violate the zoning of the STAR campus.

On April 28, 2014, the City of Newark Board of Adjustment upheld its April 19, 2014, ruling that the power plant is an accessory to the data center and that no rezoning was required. The ruling is presently under appeal. The University of Delaware's Sustainability Task Force sent an open letter to President Harker citing concerns that the project violates the university's strategic plan and Climate Action Plan. On May 4, 2014, the University Faculty Senate voted 43 to 0 (with 8 abstentions) to recommend to the administration that it not allow construction of The Data Center on UD's STAR campus if The Data Center includes any fossil-fuel-burning power plant. On July 10, 2014, the university announced that it was terminating the lease for the project.

== Notable alumni and faculty ==
Notable alumni and faculty of the University of Delaware include 46th President of the United States, 47th Vice President of the United States, and former U.S. Senator Joe Biden (B.A. 1965); First Lady of the United States Jill Biden (B.A. 1976); former New Jersey Governor Chris Christie (B.A. 1984); campaign manager David Plouffe (B.A. 2010); vice chancellors of the Delaware Court of Chancery Sam Glasscock III (B.A. History 1979, M.M.P. Marine Policy 1989) and Paul A. Fioravanti Jr. (B.A. Political Science); Nobel Prize-winning microbiologist Daniel Nathans (B.S. 1950); Nobel Prize-winning organic chemist Richard F. Heck; Director of Research Division at NASA Henry C Brinton (B.S. Physics, 1957); Rwandan Minister of Foreign Affairs and Cooperation, Louise Mushikiwabo (M.A. 1988); former president of Emory University James W. Wagner (B.A. 1975); former Chicago Bears head coach Matt Nagy; Super Bowl XLVII's MVP Joe Flacco; 2002 NFL MVP Rich Gannon (B.A. 1987); and 2008 John McCain campaign manager Steve Schmidt (B.A. 1993).

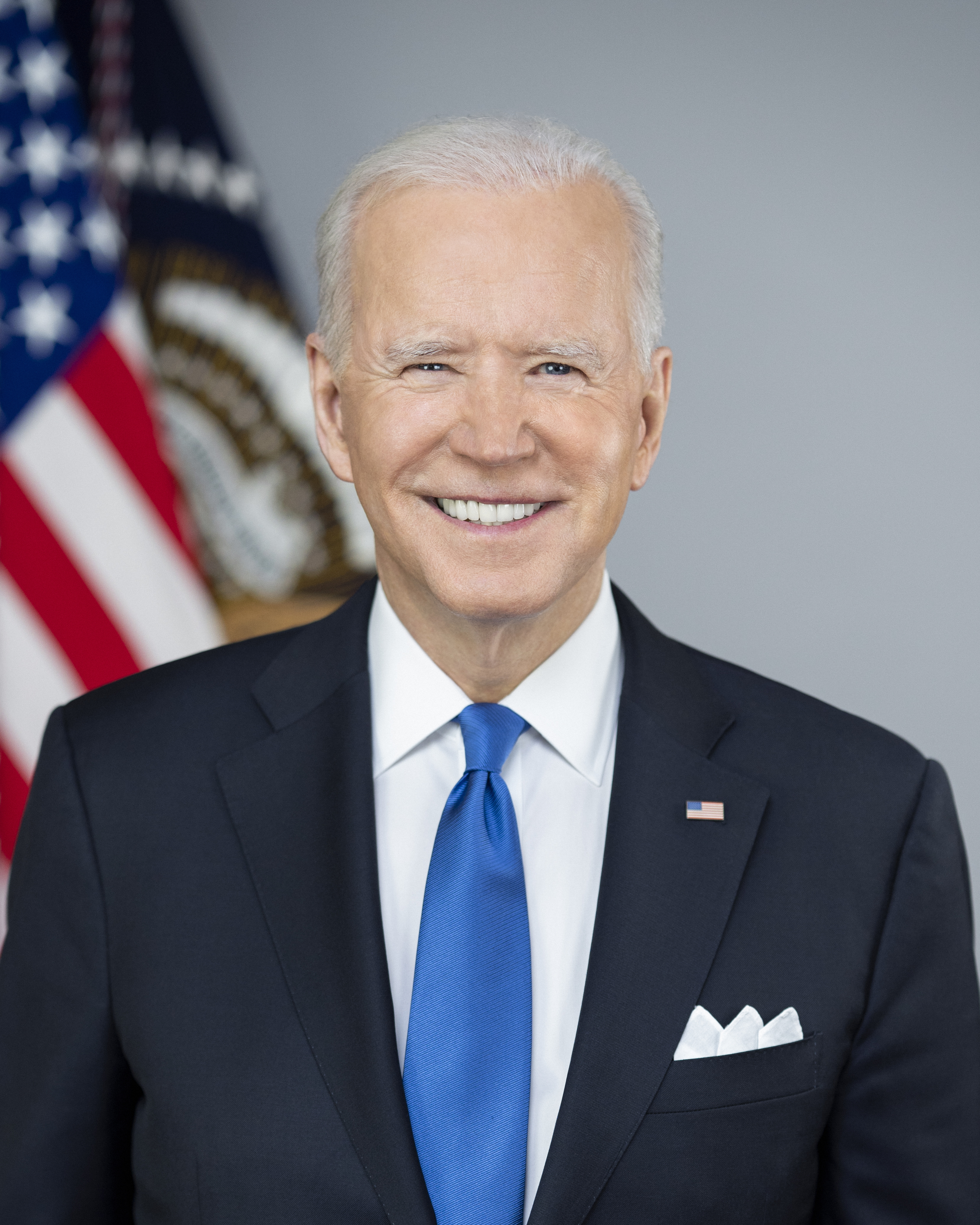
Joe Biden, 46th president of the United States, 47th vice president of the United States and former U.S. senator for Delaware

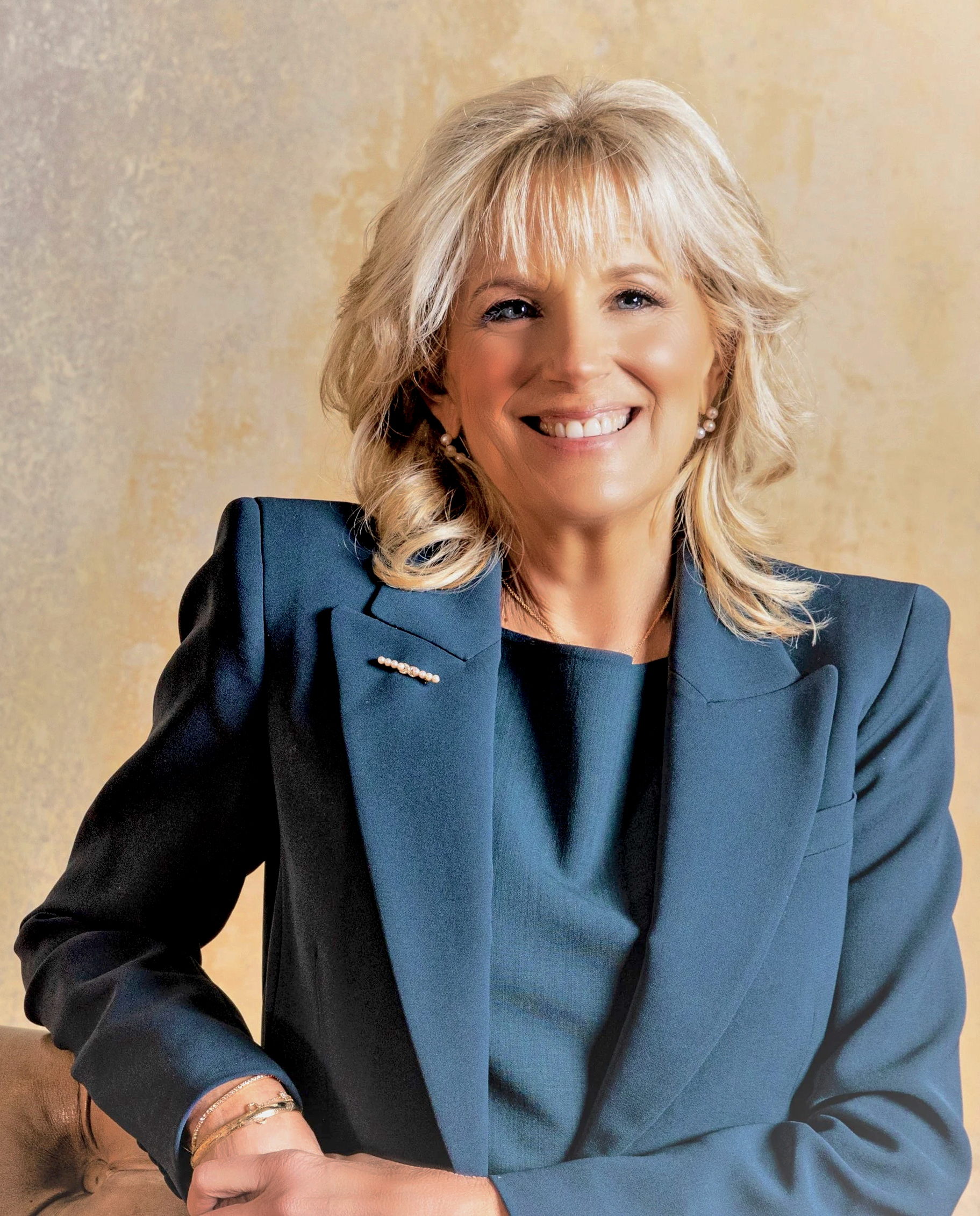
Jill Biden, First Lady of the United States and former Second Lady of the United States

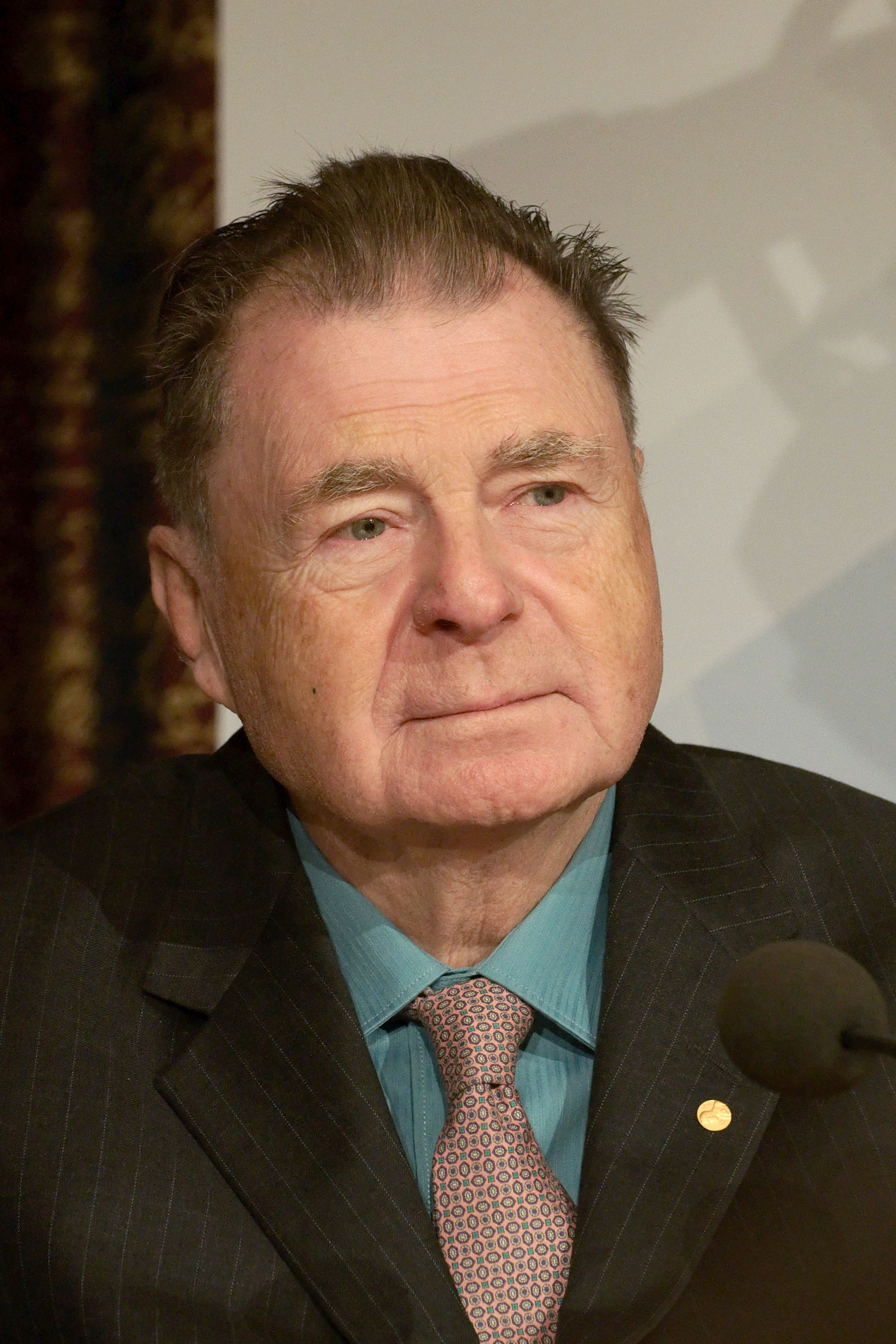
Richard F. Heck, Nobel Prize in Chemistry laureate

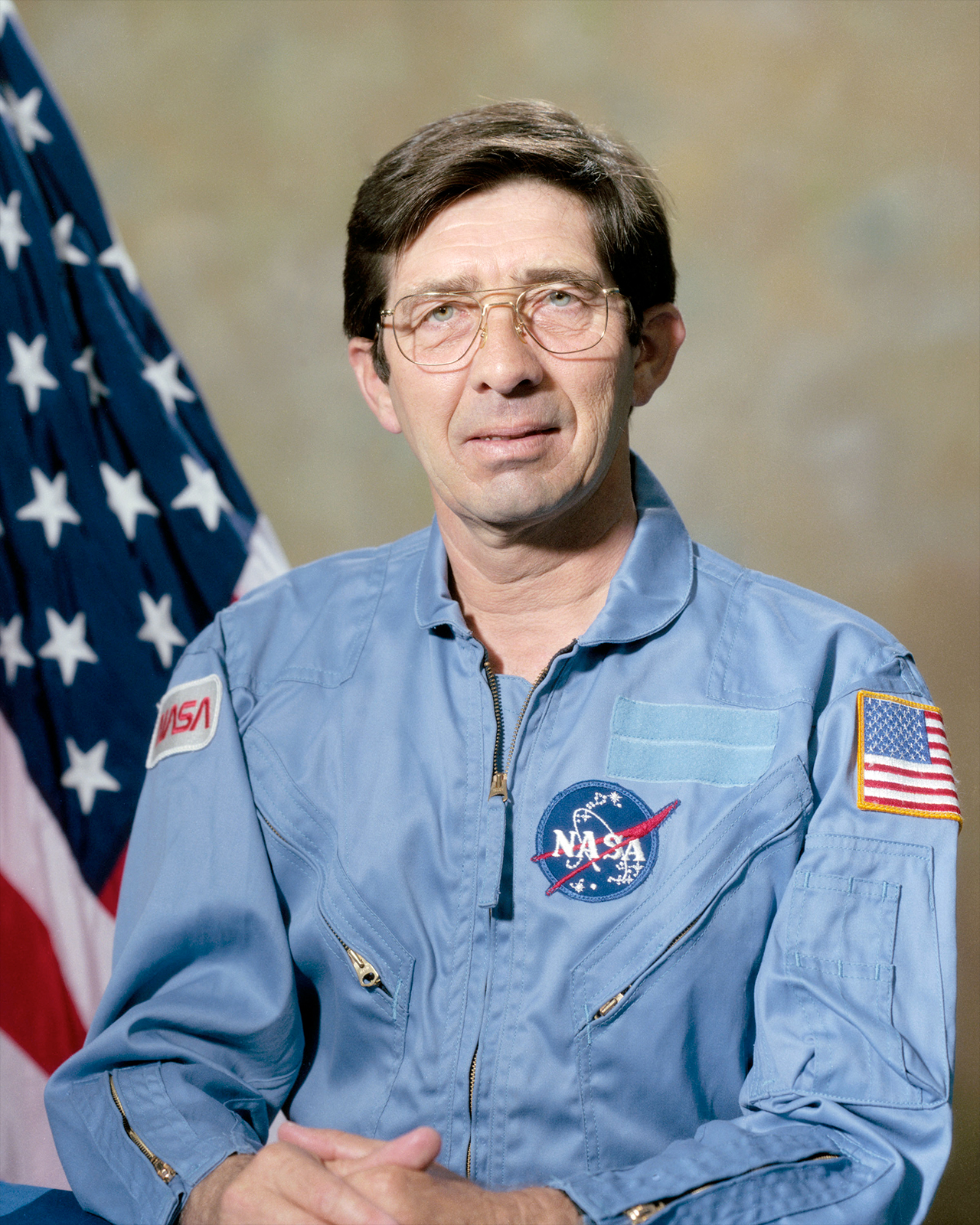
Lodewijk van den Berg, astronaut

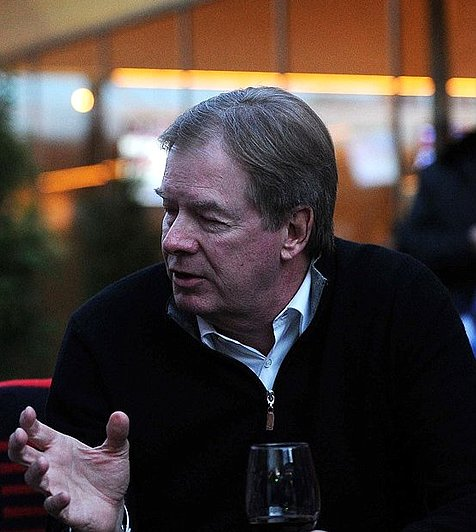
Larry Probst, CEO of Electronic Arts

George Read, former president of Delaware, former U.S. senator from Delaware and signer of the Declaration of Independence and U.S. Constitution

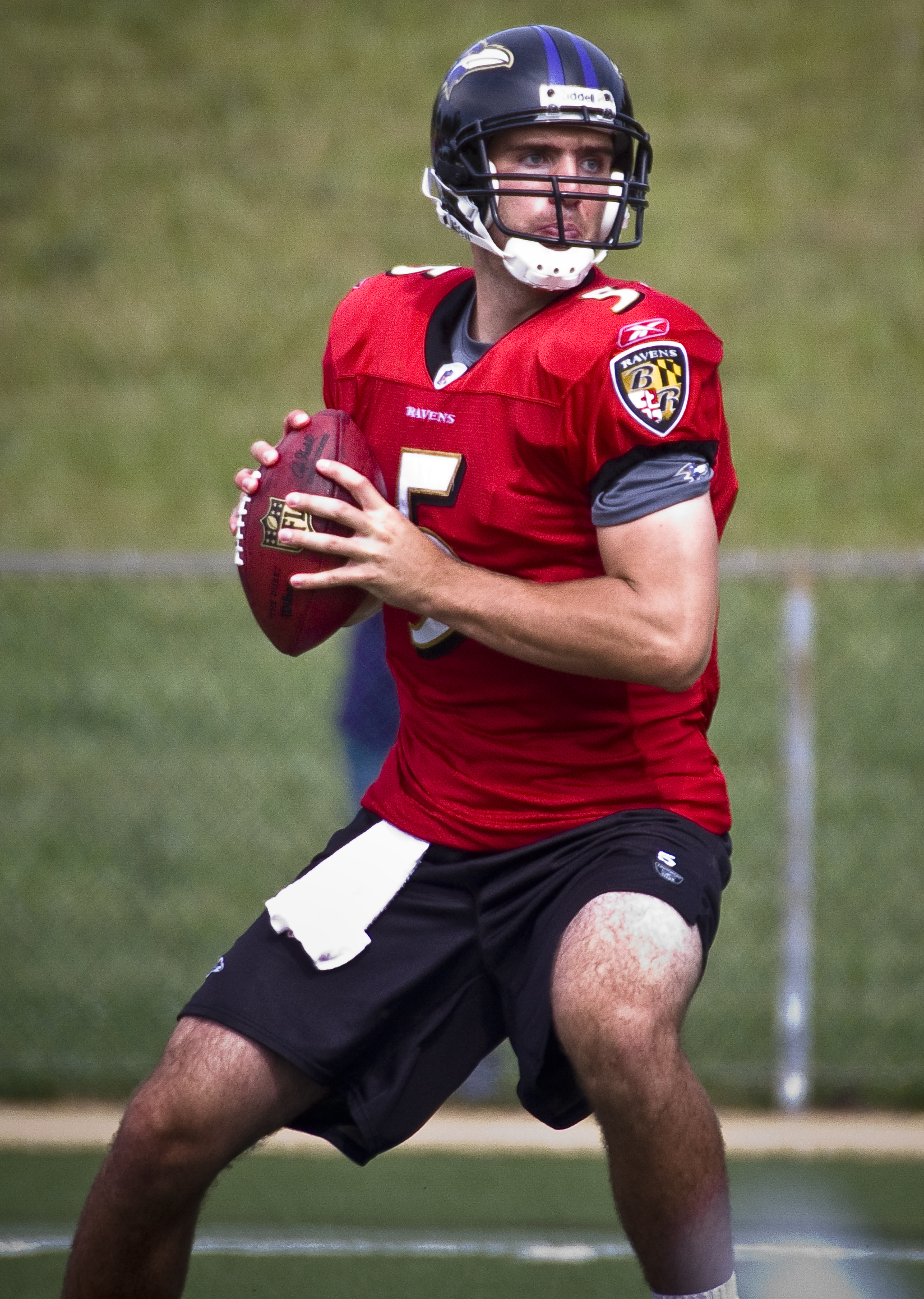
Joe Flacco, NFL quarterback for the New York Jets, Super Bowl XLVII Champion & MVP with the Baltimore Ravens

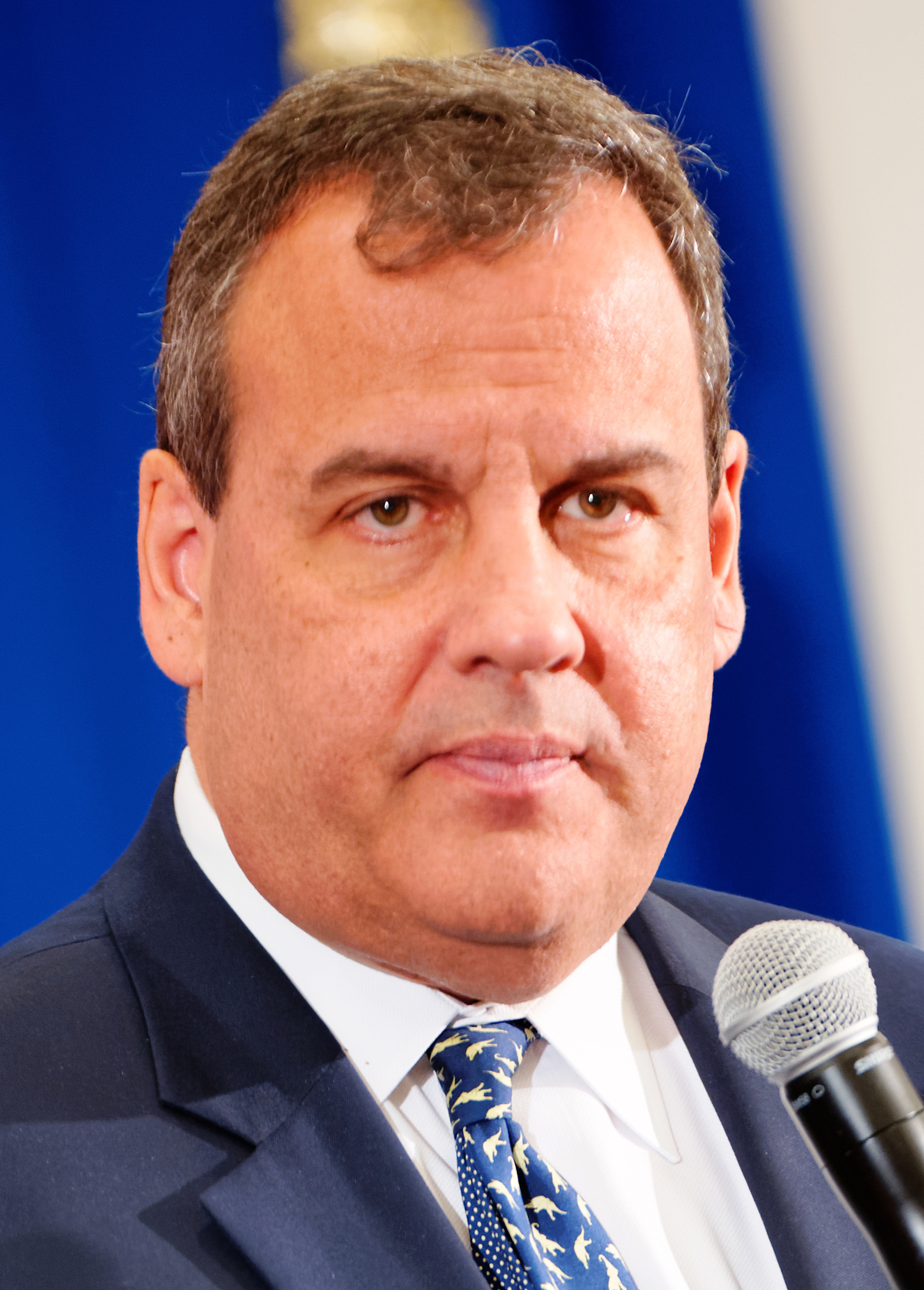
Chris Christie, former governor of New Jersey

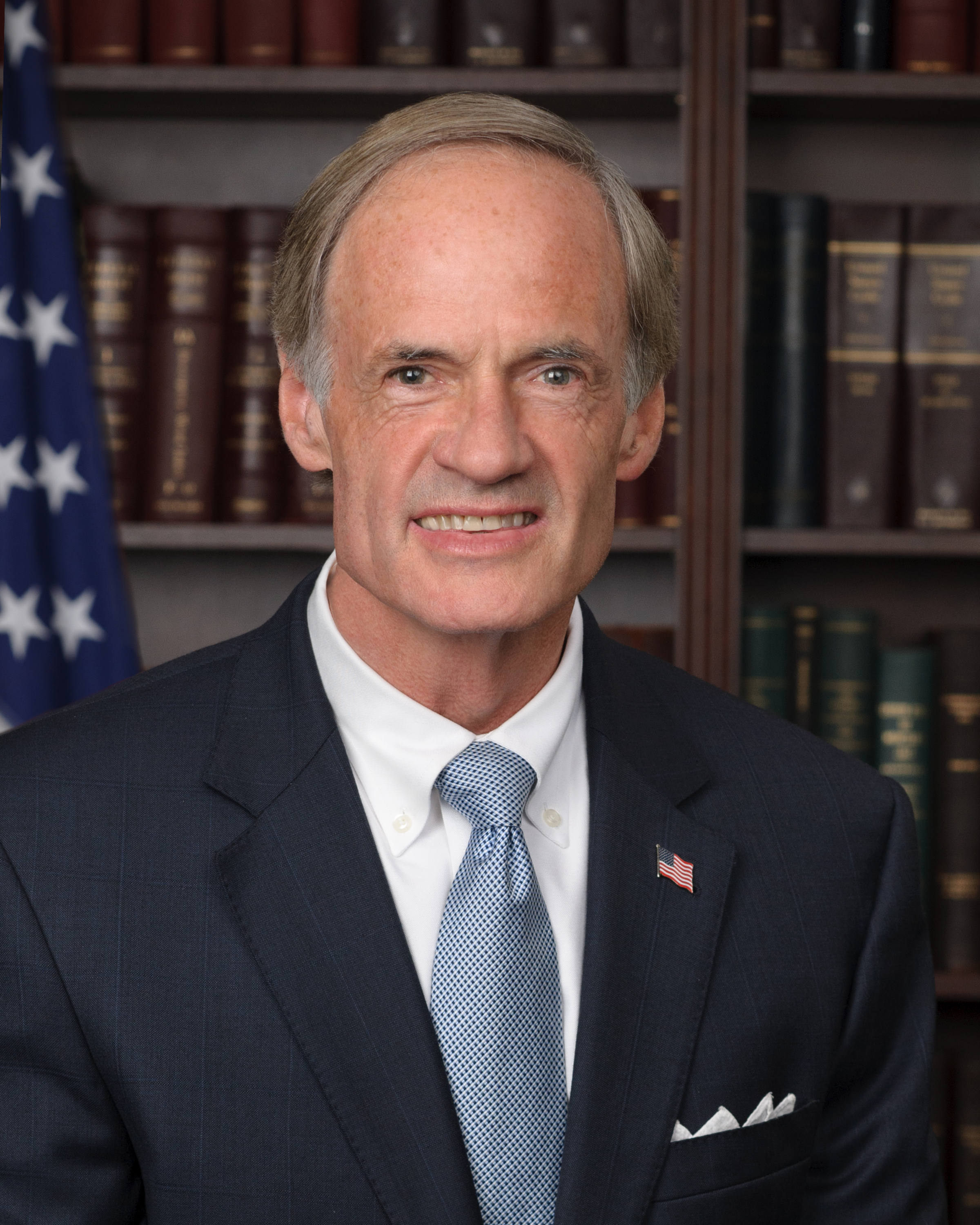
Tom Carper, U.S. senator for Delaware

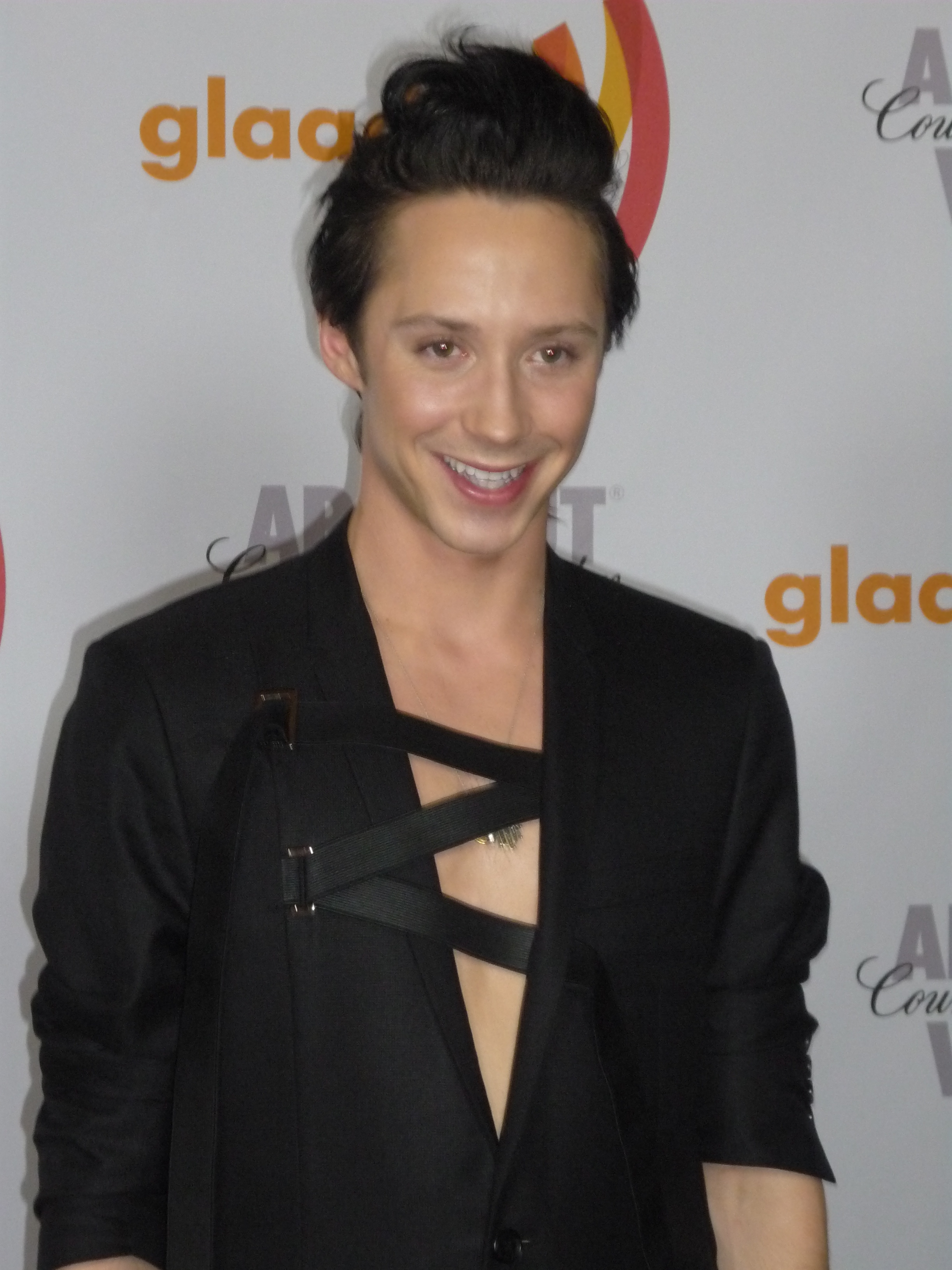
Johnny Weir, former Olympic figure skater (attended, but did not graduate)

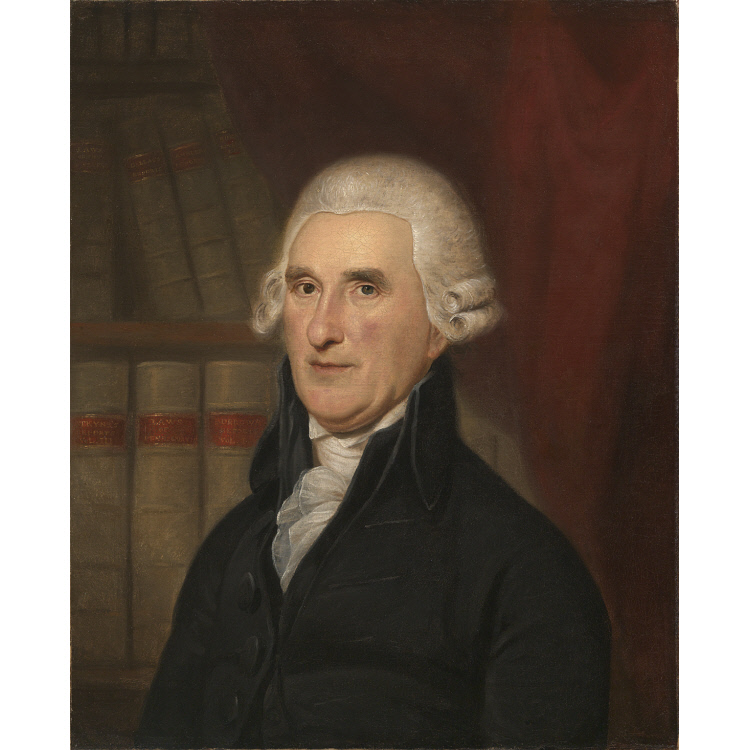
Thomas McKean, president of the Continental Congress, former governor of Pennsylvania and president of Delaware, and signer of the Declaration of Independence

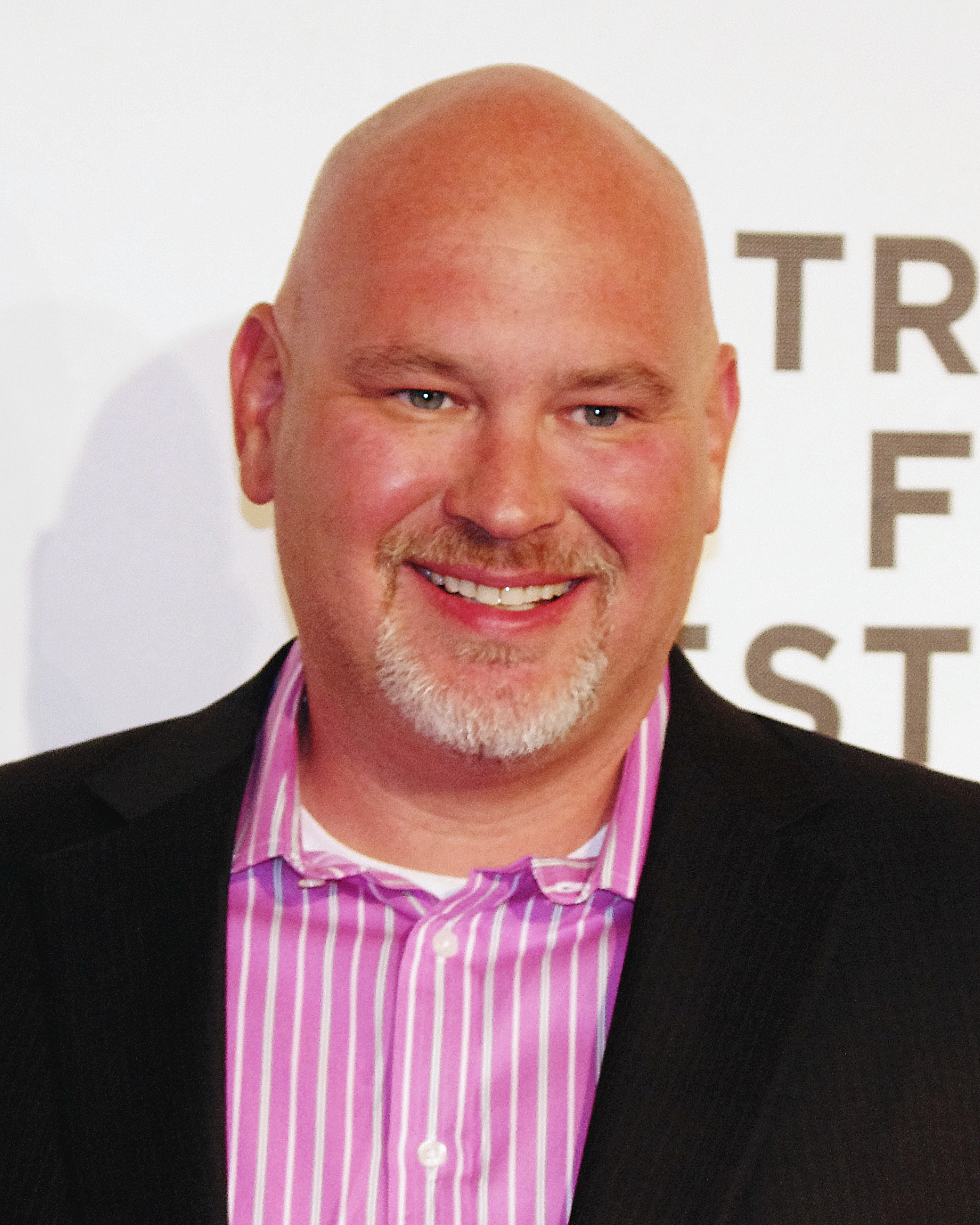
Steve Schmidt, political communications strategist

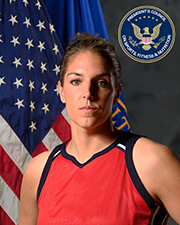
Elena Delle Donne, WNBA player for the Washington Mystics

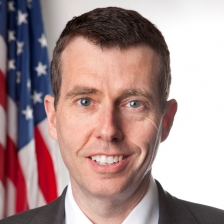
David Plouffe, former senior advisor to President Barack Obama

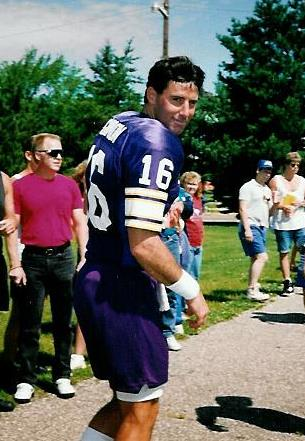
Rich Gannon, 2002 NFL MVP, appeared in Super Bowl XXXVII for the Oakland Raiders
