= WVUD =

Radio station at the University of Delaware

- Newark, Delaware; United States
- Broadcast area: Newark, Delaware
- Frequency: 91.3 MHz (HD Radio)

Programming
- Format: Freeform
- Subchannels: HD2: Freeform ("The Basement"); HD3: Sports ("Henscast")

Ownership
- Owner: University of Delaware

History
- First air date: October 4, 1976 (as WXDR)
- Former call signs: WXDR (1976–1992)
- Call sign meaning: Voice of the University of Delaware

Technical information
- Licensing authority: FCC
- Facility ID: 69439
- Class: B1
- ERP: 790 watts horiz. (analog); 6,800 watts vert. (analog); 272 watts (digital)
- HAAT: 37 meters (121 ft) (horiz.); 41 meters (135 ft) (vert.)
- Transmitter coordinates: 39°41′26.4″N 75°45′21.8″W

Links
- Public license information: Public file; LMS
- Website: www.wvud.org

WVUD (91.3 FM) is a non-commercial educational FM radio station owned by University of Delaware and licensed to serve Newark, Delaware. The station is student-run and broadcasts a freeform format. Studios are located in the Perkins student center at the University of Delaware and the transmitting antenna is located on the top of the Christiana East Tower residence building.

WVUD uses HD Radio and broadcasts freeform programming on its HD2 subchannel branded as "The Basement" and University of Delaware sports programming on its HD3 subchannel branded as "Henscast"

On May 8, 2017, three veterans of WVUD were enshrined in its Hall of Fame. Ellen Ellis, Dr. Gloria James and Michael Tsarouhas were the three inductees for 2017.

== History ==
University of Delaware Radio was originally broadcast from East Hall via AM carrier current at 640 kHz from 1968 until 1976, with the WHEN call sign as a Top 40 formatted station. The station changed call signs to WDRB with a format change to alternative rock when the station's studios were moved to the third floor of the Perkins Student Center.

The FM station that would later become WVUD signed on for the first time on October 4, 1976, with the WXDR call sign. The station's first permanent license was granted by the Federal Communications Commission (FCC) on April 6, 1977. The new station broadcast a block format that included jazz, folk, classical, ambient, college alternative, and experimental music. Local news was presented each day and the students presented a weekly news magazine show and community oriented public affairs shows.

On April 8, 1983, WXDR resumed broadcasting after being off the air for five months during which time the station installed new equipment to increase its effective radiated power from 10 watts to 1,000 watts and to convert from mono to stereo. Studios were moved to the lower level of the Perkins Student Center Annex building at that time.

The station's call sign was changed to WVUD on October 19, 1992. University President David Roselle had requested that the call sign be changed to WVUD to reflect the station's university ownership. This call sign had recently been ceded by an easy listening station, Lite 100 FM, which had been owned by the University of Dayton, but had been sold off by the university and had subsequently changed call signs to WLQT.

WVUD was granted an increase in effective radiated power to 6,800 watts in August 2011. HD Radio was added two months later beginning on October 31, 2011.

== Programming ==
- Hip City (Saturday night) A fixture featuring classic soul and rhythm & blues as presented by Jerry Grant.
- Red, Hot & Blue (Friday night) Featuring blues hosted by Ron Smith.
- Crazy College (Sundays) Featuring "all musics odd, silly or forgotten. Anything from Stan Freberg, Allan Sherman, Billy Murray, Cole Porter, George Formby, if it's odd or funny, it's in!" hosted by Geo. Stewart.
- Java Time & Roots (Weekday mornings) features Roots and Folk music.
- Classical music (Weekdays at lunchtime)
- Scratchy Grooves' & In a Mist (Sunday nights) Big Band and popular music of the 1920s, 1930s, 1940s and 1950s.
- Ruffage (Saturdays) Delaware's longest running and only Heavy Metal/Hard Rock radio show. Beginning over 21 years ago, the show was originally hosted by Rich Grafstein (its originator) and has since been hosted by Traci, Metallikate, The Tink, Josh and Stefanie Best, among others. Currently the show is being once again hosted by Metallikate and Traci.
- Charles Dickens' A Christmas Carol: live radio play (Annual live radio broadcast of Charles Dickens' classic holiday ghost story.) A Delaware tradition since 2004. Performed by a small cast of professional actors, featuring music and sound effects. Directed by Sara Valentine. Scripted and created by Sara Valentine and Michael Boudewyns.

== See also ==
- Campus radio
- List of college radio stations in the United States
