= America East Conference women's soccer tournament =

America East women's soccer tournament
- Conference soccer championship
- Sport: College soccer
- Conference: America East Conference
- Number of teams: 9
- Format: Single-elimination tournament
- Played: 1994–present
- Last contest: 2026
- Current champion: Bryant (1st title)
- Most championships: Boston University (9)
- TV partner: ESPN+
- Official website: americaeast.com/sports/wsoccer

The America East women's soccer tournament (formerly known as the North Atlantic Conference championship (Note: The tournament was specifically called the "North Atlantic Conference championship" from 1989 until 1996.)) is the conference championship tournament in soccer for the America East Conference.

The tournament has been held every year since 1994. It is a single-elimination tournament and seeding is based on regular season records. The winner, declared conference champion, receives the conference's automatic bid to the NCAA Division I women's soccer championship.

Boston University is the most winning team of the competition with 9 titles won.

== Winners ==
The following is a list of America East tournament winners:

=== Finals ===
Key

- (1) – Title number
- a.e.t. – Match went to extra time
- p – Match decided by a penalty shootout after extra time
- – Winning team also won regular season

Ed.	Year	Champion	Score	Runner-up	Venue	MVP	Ref.
1	1994	Hartford (1)	4–2	Delaware	Al-Marzook Field • West Hartford, CT	Lisa Kesselman, Hartford	
2	1995	Hartford (2)	3–0 (a.e.t.)	Delaware	Al-Marzook Field • West Hartford, CT	Irene Stelling, Hartford	
3	1996	Towson (1)	2–1	Delaware	Centennial Field • Burlington, VT	Megan Lumsden, Towson	
4	1997	Hartford (3)	8–0	Towson	Centennial Field • Burlington, VT	Maria Kun, Hartford	
5	1998	Hartford (4)	4–0	New Hampshire	Center Field • Towson, MD	Danielle Korbmacher, Hartford	
6	1999	Hartford (5)	2–1	Boston University	Al-Marzook Field • West Hartford, CT	Sandra Doreleijers, Hartford	
7	2000	Boston University (1)	4–1	Hartford	Al-Marzook Field • West Hartford, CT	Deidre Enos, Boston U.	
8	2001	Boston University (2)	2–0	Hartford	Nickerson Field • Boston, MA	Megan Cross, Boston U.	
9	2002	Hartford (6)	4–0	Stony Brook	Al-Marzook Field • West Hartford, CT	Jeanette Akerlund, Hartford	
10	2003	Boston University (3)	0–0 (3–2 p)	Maine	Nickerson Field • Boston, MA	Jessica Clinton, Boston U.	
11	2004	Binghamton (1)	2–0	Maine	Bearcats Complex • Binghamton, NY	Meghan Taylor, Binghamton	
12	2005	Boston University (4)	2–1 (a.e.t.)	Maine	Nickerson Field • Boston, MA	Susan Marschall, Boston U.	
13	2006	Hartford (6)	1–0	Maine	Al-Marzook Field • West Hartford, CT	Megan Riemer, Hartford	
14	2007	Boston University (5)	2–1	New Hampshire	Wildcat Stadium • Durham, NH	Casey Brown, Boston U.	
15	2008	Boston University (6)	2–1	Stony Brook	Nickerson Field • Boston, MA	Marisha Schumacher, Boston U.	
16	2009	Boston University (7)	4–0	Binghamton	Nickerson Field • Boston, MA	Farrell McClernon, Boston U.	
17	2010	Boston University (8)	4–0	Maine	Nickerson Field • Boston, MA	Jessica Luscinski, Boston U.	
18	2011	Boston University (9)	2–0	Albany	Nickerson Field • Boston, MA	Angelina Cords, Boston U.	
19	2012	Stony Brook (1)	1–0	Hartford	Al-Marzook Field • West Hartford, CT	Sa'sha Kershaw, Stony Brook	
20	2013	UMBC (1)	2–1	Stony Brook	Retriever Soccer Park • Baltimore, MD	Jessy Brown, UMBC	
21	2014	New Hampshire (1)	3–1	Hartford	Al-Marzook Field • West Hartford, CT	Mimi Borkan, New Hampshire	
22	2015	Albany (1)	2–1	Hartford	Al-Marzook Field • West Hartford, CT	Kelly Kempf, Albany	
23	2016	Albany (2)	2–1	Hartford	Casey Stadium • Albany, NY	Catilyn Paltsios, Albany	
24	2017	Stony Brook (1)	2–1	Vermont	LaValle Stadium • Stony Brook, NY	Sydney Vaughn, Stony Brook	
25	2018	Albany (3)	4–1	UMass Lowell	Casey Stadium • Albany, NY	Miariah Williams, Albany	
26	2019	Stony Brook (2)	2–1	Hartford	LaValle Stadium • Stony Brook, NY	Erin O'Connor, Stony Brook	
27	2020	Stony Brook (3)	1–0	Binghamton	Cushing Field • Lowell, MA	Fanny Gotesson, Stony Brook	
28	2021	Vermont (1)	1–0	New Hampshire	Virtue Field • Burlington, VT	Cricket Basa, Vermont	
29	2022	New Hampshire (2)	4–4 (3–2 p)	Binghamton	Bearcats Complex • Binghamton, NY	Cat Sheppard, New Hampshire	
30	2023	Maine (1)	3–2 (a.e.t.)	UMass Lowell	Mahaney Diamond • Orono, ME	Lara Kirkby, Maine	
31	2024	Maine (2)	3–0	New Hampshire	Mahaney Diamond • Orono, ME	Lara Kirkby, Maine	
31	2025	Maine (3)	2–2 (4–3 p)	Vermont	Virtue Field • Burlington, VT	Elena Barenberg, Maine	
32	2026	Bryant (1)	2–2 (4–3 p)	Binghamton	Bearcats Sports Complex • Vestal, NY	Colleen Ardolino, Bryant	

=== By school ===
As of 2026 tournament

Former members of the AEC, are listed in italics

School	W	L	T	PCT	Finals	Titles	Winning years
Albany	12	7	1	.625	4	3	2015, 2016, 2018
Binghamton	6	10	9	.420	5	1	2004
Bryant	1	2	2	.400	1	1	2026
Boston University	18	4	2	.792	10	9	2000, 2001, 2003, 2005, 2007, 2008, 2009, 2010, 2011
Delaware	3	5	0	.375	3	0	—
Drexel	0	0	0	–	0	0	—
Hartford	23	13	3	.628	13	6	1994, 1995, 1997, 1998, 1999, 2002
Hofstra	0	3	0	.000	0	0	—
Maine	11	12	8	.484	9	3	2023–2025
New Hampshire	4	21	6	.226	6	2	2014, 2022
NJIT	1	2	0	.333	0	0	—
Northeastern	1	3	0	.250	0	0	—
Stony Brook	14	7	2	.652	6	3	2017, 2019, 2020
Towson	2	2	2	.500	2	1	1996
UMass Lowell	2	5	2	.333	2	0	—
UMBC	3	4	1	.438	1	1	2013
Vermont	6	12	6	.375	3	1	2021
