= 2016 America East Conference women's soccer season =

America East Conference
- Season: 2016

2016 America East Conference women's soccer standings
	Conf.						Overall
Team	W		L		T	PCT	W		L		T	PCT
Hartford ‍†‍‍	6	–	1	–	1	.813	13	–	5	–	1	.711
Albany ‍†‍‡‍^{y}	6	–	1	–	1	.813	11	–	8	–	1	.575
Stony Brook ‍‍‍	6	–	2	–	0	.750	9	–	8	–	3	.525
New Hampshire ‍‍‍	3	–	4	–	1	.438	7	–	9	–	3	.447
Maine ‍‍‍	3	–	5	–	0	.375	7	–	9	–	0	.438
UMass Lowell * ‍‍‍	3	–	5	–	0	.375	5	–	10	–	2	.353
Vermont ‍‍‍	2	–	4	–	2	.375	7	–	8	–	4	.474
UMBC ‍‍‍	2	–	5	–	1	.313	6	–	10	–	1	.382
Binghamton ‍‍‍	2	–	6	–	0	.250	6	–	10	–	2	.389
† – Conference champion ‡ – 2016 America East Tournament champion y – Invited to the NCAA tournament * – UMass Lowell ineligible for postseason (D2 to D1 regulations); As of 2016-11-17; Rankings from NSCAA

The 2016 America East Conference men's soccer season was the 21st season of women's varsity soccer in the conference.

== Teams ==
=== Stadia and locations ===
Team	Location	Stadium	Capacity
Albany Great Danes	Albany, New York	Bob Ford Field	8,500
Binghamton Bearcats	Binghamton, New York	Bearcat Sports Complex	2,500
Hartford Hawks	West Hartford, Connecticut	Al-Marzook Field	1,000
Maine Black Bears	Orono, Maine	Alumni Field	500
New Hampshire Wildcats	Durham, New Hampshire	Bremner Field	—N/a
Stony Brook Seawolves	Stony Brook, New York	LaValle Stadium	8,136
UMass Lowell River Hawks	Lowell, Massachusetts	Cushing Field Complex	500
UMBC Retrievers	Baltimore, Maryland	Retriever Soccer Park	1,500
Vermont Catamounts	Burlington, Vermont	Virtue Field	1,500

== Regular season ==
=== Rankings ===
Legend
Increase in ranking
Decrease in ranking
Not ranked previous week

		Pre	Wk 2	Wk 3	Wk 4	Wk 5	Wk 6	Wk 7	Wk 8	Wk 9	Wk 10	Wk 11	Wk 12	Wk 13	Final
Albany	C														
Binghamton	C														
Hartford	C														
Maine	C														
New Hampshire	C														
Stony Brook	C														
UMass Lowell	C														
UMBC	C														
Vermont	C														

== Postseason ==
=== AmEast tournament ===
This was the program’s first league title. The single-elimination tournament was held from 27 October to 6 November 2016. In the final, the Albany Great Danes defeated the Hartford Hawks 2-1.

=== NCAA tournament ===
Seed	Region	School	1st round	2nd round	3rd round	Quarterfinals	Semifinals	Championship

== All-AEast awards and teams ==
2016 Am-East Women's Soccer Individual Awards
Award	Recipient(s)
Player of the Year	
Coach of the Year	
Defensive Player of the Year	
Freshman of the Year	

2016 Am-East Women's Soccer All-Conference Teams
First Team	Second Team	Rookie Team

== See also ==
- 2016 NCAA Division I women's soccer season
- 2016 America East Conference Women's Soccer Tournament
- 2016 America East Conference men's soccer season
