= 2018 America East men's soccer tournament =

- Classification: Division I
- Teams: 6
- Matches: 5
- Quarterfinals site: Higher seeds
- Semifinals site: Higher seeds
- Finals site: Wildcat Stadium; Durham, New Hampshire
- Champions: New Hampshire (1st title)
- Winning coach: Marc Hubbard (1st title)
- MVP: Josh Bauer (New Hampshire)
- Broadcast: AETV, ESPN+

2018 America East Conference men's soccer standings
	Conf.					Overall
Team	W		L		T	W		L		T
Stony Brook	5	–	1	–	1	8	–	6	–	3
New Hampshire ‡	4	–	2	–	1	12	–	4	–	2
Vermont	4	–	3	–	0	11	–	7	–	1
UMass Lowell	4	–	3	–	0	10	–	6	–	2
UMBC	3	–	3	–	1	10	–	6	–	4
Albany	3	–	4	–	0	8	–	10	–	0
Binghamton	2	–	5	–	0	3	–	12	–	2
Hartford	1	–	5	–	1	1	–	10	–	5
‡ – 2018 Am. East Tournament champion + – Invited to the 2018 NCAA tournament; As of December 11, 2018; Rankings from United Soccer Coaches

The 2018 America East men's soccer tournament was the 30th edition of the tournament. The tournament decided the America East Conference champion and guaranteed representative into the 2018 NCAA Division I Men's Soccer Championship. The tournament began on November 3 and concluded on November 11.

Two-time defending champions, Albany, were eliminated in the first round by UMass Lowell, meaning there would be a new America East Tournament champion for the first time since 2015. New Hampshire ultimately won the championship, defeating UMBC by a 5-0 scoreline in the final. It was New Hampshire's first America East championship they won, losing the previous four occasions.

New Hampshire was the conference's lone bid into the NCAA Tournament. They hosted Colgate for the chance to play the top overall seed, Wake Forest in the second round. There, New Hampshire lost 1–0 to Colgate.

== Seeds ==
Seed	School	Conference	Tiebreaker
1	Stony Brook	5–1–1	
2	New Hampshire	4–2–1	
3	UMass Lowell	4–3–0	UML 1–0 vs. UVM
4	Vermont	4–3–0	UVM 0–1 vs. UML
5	UMBC	3–3–1	
6	Albany	3–4–0	

== Bracket ==
First round Nov. 3
4	Vermont	1 (4)
5	UMBC (pen.)	1 (5)
3	UMass Lowell	1
6	Albany	0

Semifinals; Nov. 7
1	Stony Brook	0
5	UMBC	1
2	New Hampshire	2
3	UMass Lowell	0

Final; Nov. 11
2	New Hampshire	5
5	UMBC	0

== Results ==
=== First round ===
November 3
12:00 p.m. EST

No. 4 Vermont	1–1 (a.e.t.)	No. 5 UMBC
Bryant 55'	Report	Bailey 62'
Penalties
Kabala (penalty scored); Freitas (penalty scored); Hansson (penalty scored); Halldórsson (penalty scored); Alves (penalty scored); Camara (penalty missed); Bryant (penalty missed)	4–5	(penalty missed) Gielen; (penalty scored) Weyant; (penalty scored) Jean-Gilles; (penalty scored) Dao; (penalty scored) O'Loughlin; (penalty missed) MacCartney; (penalty scored) Becher

Virtue Field
Burlington, Vermont
Attendance: 353
Referee: Jan Halaska

November 3
4:00 p.m. EST

No. 3 UMass Lowell	1–0	No. 6 Albany
Miller 88'	Report

Cushing Field Complex
Lowell, Massachusetts
Attendance: 288
Referee: Noel Cotterell

=== Semifinals ===
November 7
7:00 p.m. EST

No. 1 Stony Brook	0–1	No. 5 UMBC
	Report	Dove 60'

LaValle Stadium
Stony Brook, New York
Attendance: 224
Referee: Lou Labbadia

November 7
7:00 p.m. EST

No. 2 New Hampshire	2–0	No. 3 UMass Lowell
Colacci 24'; Reichenberg 42' (o.g.)	Report

Wildcat Stadium
Durham, New Hampshire
Attendance: 796
Referee: Alan Kelly

=== Final ===
November 11
2:00 p.m. EST

No. 2 New Hampshire	5–0	No. 5 UMBC
Bauer 5'; Valencia 6'; Fallberg 18'; Brewster 49'; Doherty 57'	Report

Wildcat Stadium
Durham, New Hampshire
Attendance: 1,290
Referee: Carlos Fernandes

== Awards and honors ==
- Tournament MVP: Josh Bauer, New Hampshire

All-Tournament team:

- Lars Huxsohl, New Hampshire
- Antonio Colacci, New Hampshire
- Alex Valencia, New Hampshire
- Josh Bauer, New Hampshire
- Jon Bell, UMBC
- Jordan Dove, UMBC
- Jonathan Bryant, Vermont

- Kyle Saunderson, UMBC
- Owen Miller, UMass Lowell
- Roko Prsa, UMass Lowell
- Arni Jakobsson, Stony Brook
- Martieon Watson, Stony Brook
- Danny Vitiello, Albany

== See also ==
- 2018 America East Conference Women's Soccer Tournament
