= 2016 America East Conference women's soccer tournament =

- Classification: Division I
- Teams: 6
- Matches: 5
- Site: Campus Sites (Higher Seed)
- Champions: Albany (2nd title)
- Winning coach: Caitlin Cucchiella (2nd title)

2016 America East Conference women's soccer standings
| | Conf. | | | | | | Overall |
| Team | W | | L | | T | PCT | W | | L | | T | PCT |
|---|---|---|---|---|---|---|---|---|---|---|---|---|
| Hartford ‍†‍‍ | 6 | – | 1 | – | 1 | .813 | 13 | – | 5 | – | 1 | .711 |
| Albany ‍†‍‡‍^{y} | 6 | – | 1 | – | 1 | .813 | 11 | – | 8 | – | 1 | .575 |
| Stony Brook ‍‍‍ | 6 | – | 2 | – | 0 | .750 | 9 | – | 8 | – | 3 | .525 |
| New Hampshire ‍‍‍ | 3 | – | 4 | – | 1 | .438 | 7 | – | 9 | – | 3 | .447 |
| Maine ‍‍‍ | 3 | – | 5 | – | 0 | .375 | 7 | – | 9 | – | 0 | .438 |
| UMass Lowell * ‍‍‍ | 3 | – | 5 | – | 0 | .375 | 5 | – | 10 | – | 2 | .353 |
| Vermont ‍‍‍ | 2 | – | 4 | – | 2 | .375 | 7 | – | 8 | – | 4 | .474 |
| UMBC ‍‍‍ | 2 | – | 5 | – | 1 | .313 | 6 | – | 10 | – | 1 | .382 |
| Binghamton ‍‍‍ | 2 | – | 6 | – | 0 | .250 | 6 | – | 10 | – | 2 | .389 |
† – Conference champion ‡ – 2016 America East Tournament champion y – Invited to the NCAA tournament * – UMass Lowell ineligible for postseason (D2 to D1 regulations); As of 2016-11-17; Rankings from NSCAA

The 2016 America East Conference women's soccer tournament is the postseason women's soccer tournament for the America East Conference held from October 27 to November 6, 2016. The five match tournament was held at campus sites, with the higher seed hosting. The six team single-elimination tournament consisted of three rounds based on seeding from regular season conference play. The Albany Great Danes were the defending tournament champions, after defeating the Hartford Hawks 2–1 in the championship match for the program's first league title.

== Bracket ==
First round Thursday, Oct. 27
4 | New Hampshire | 1
5 | Maine | 0
3 | Stony Brook | 0 (1)
6 | Vermont | 0 (3)

Semifinals; Sunday, Oct. 30
1 | Albany | 1
4 | New Hampshire | 0
2 | Hartford | 1
6 | Vermont | 0

Final; Sunday, Nov. 6
1 | Albany | 2
2 | Hartford | 1

== Schedule ==
=== First Round ===
| October 27, 2016 | #4 New Hampshire | 1–0 | #5 Maine | Durham, New Hampshire |
| 7:00 p.m. EST | Lilly Radack 16' | Report | | Stadium: Bremner Field; Referee: Leah Hayes |

| October 27, 2016 | #3 Stony Brook | 0–0 (a.e.t.) (1–3 p) | #6 Vermont | Stony Brook, New York |
| 7:00 p.m. EST | | Report | | Stadium: LaValle Stadium; Referee: Bruno Mozzo |
| | Penalties |
| | Hannah Groth (penalty missed); Raven Edwards (penalty missed); Priscilla Wiggins (penalty scored); Julie Johnstonbaugh (penalty missed) | | (penalty scored) Meg James; (penalty scored) Casey Garfinkel; (penalty missed) Bridgette King; (penalty scored) Caitie Green |

=== Semifinals ===
| October 30, 2016 | #1 Albany | 1–0 | #4 New Hampshire | Albany, New York |
| 4:00 p.m. EST | Kiana Rugar 34' | Report | | Stadium: Casey Stadium; Referee: Carlos Fernandes |

| October 30, 2016 | #2 Hartford | 1–0 | #6 Vermont | West Hartford, Connecticut |
| 2:00 p.m. EST | Skylar Vitiello 76' | Report | | Stadium: Al-Marzook Field at Alumni Stadium; Attendance: 277; Referee: Noel Cotterell |

=== Final ===
| November 6, 2016 | #1 Albany | 2–1 | #2 Hartford | Albany, New York |
| 6:00 p.m. EST | Kiana Rugar 44'; Vivian Vega 76' | Report | Caitlin Smallfield 23' | Stadium: Casey Stadium; Attendance: 393; Referee: Eric Forrest |
