= Calliste Brookshire =

Greek footballer (born 2002)

Personal information
- Full name: Calliste Konstantina Brookshire
- Date of birth: 9 July 2002 (age 24)
- Place of birth: Kingston, Massachusetts, United States
- Height: 1.70 m (5 ft 7 in)
- Position: Striker

Team information
- Current team: Rangers W.F.C.
- Number: 24

Youth career
- FCUSA

College career
Years	Team	Apps	(Gls)
2020–2024	UMass Lowell River Hawks	80	(20)

Senior career*
Years	Team	Apps	(Gls)
2025	FHL	20	(2)
2026–	Rangers	14	(3)

International career^{‡}
2025–	Greece	10	(4)
- * Club domestic league appearances and goals as of 3 June 2026 ‡ National team caps and goals as of 20:02, 9 October 2026 (UTC)

Calliste Konstantina Brookshire (Greek: Καλλίστη Κωνσταντίνα Μπρουκσάιρ, born 9 July 2002), also known as Kallisti Brouksair, is a professional footballer who plays as a forward for Scottish Women's Premier League club Rangers. Born in the United States, she plays for the Greece national team.

== Early life ==
Calliste Konstantina Brookshire was born in Kingston, Massachusetts, United States, to a Greek mother and an American father.

Brookshire attended Silver Lake Regional High School, where she was named captain of her senior team and earned MVP honours for her division. The first club she joined was FCUSA, where she played until 2019.

== College career ==
Brookshire signed with the UMass Lowell River Hawks ahead of the 2020 season, which was delayed due to the COVID-19 pandemic. She made eight appearances and scored her first collegiate goal against New Hampshire in her first career start.

In 2021, she started 17 matches, scoring three goals and helping the team reach the conference semi-finals for a second consecutive year. During the 2022 season, she recorded a career-high seven goals in 18 appearances.

In 2023, Brookshire led the conference in assists with eight and was named to the America East All-Conference Second Team. She also helped the team reach the conference final, scoring an equalizing penalty in the 86th minute to send the match to extra time. The River Hawks were ultimately defeated 3–2 by Maine.

In her fifth and final season, she made 19 appearances, leading the team with four goals and six assists, and was again named to the America East All-Conference Second Team. As of 2024, she holds the UMass Lowell Division I program records for career assists (18) and single-season assists (8).

== Club career ==
On 20 February 2025, Calliste Brookshire signed for newly promoted Besta deild kvenna club FHL in Iceland. She made 21 appearances and scored two goals during the season, as the club finished bottom of the league and was relegated to the second division. Her first goal for the club came in their only win of the season, against Fram.

On 9 January 2026, she joined Scottish Women's Premier League (SWPL) club Rangers. In the second half of the 2025–26 Scottish Women's Premier League season, Brookshire helped Rangers to finish second in the league and reach the finals of the Scottish Cup and the SWPL Cup, where they ultimately lost to Celtic and Glasgow City respectively. She made 20 appearances in all competitions and scored three goals.

== International career ==
Ahead of the 2025 UEFA Women's Nations League matches, Brookshire was called up to the Greek national team by Alexandros Katikaridis. She made her international debut on 30 May 2025 against Slovenia, coming on as a substitute in the 75th minute for Maria Mitkou. She scored her first international goal in a 2–0 friendly victory over Belarus.

== International goals ==
Scores and results list Greece's goal tally first, score column indicates score after each Brookshire goal.

No.	Date	Venue	Opponent	Score	Result	Competition
1.	29 November 2025	Bosnia and Herzegovina FA Training Centre, Zenica, Bosnia and Herzegovina	Belarus	2–0	2–0	Friendly
2.	3 March 2026	Theodoros Vardinogiannis Stadium, Heraklion, Greece	Georgia	2–0	3–0	2027 FIFA Women's World Cup qualification
3.	9 June 2026	Mikheil Meskhi Stadium, Tbilisi, Georgia	Georgia	3–1	3–2	2027 FIFA Women's World Cup qualification
4.	9 October 2026	Theodoros Vardinogiannis Stadium, Heraklion, Greece	England	1–3	1–3	2027 FIFA Women's World Cup qualification

== Career statistics ==
=== College ===
Team	Season	NCAA Regular Season			AmEast Tournament		NCAA Tournament		Total	
Team	Season	Division	Apps	Goals	Apps	Goals	Apps	Goals	Apps	Goals
UMass Lowell River Hawks	2020	Div. I	7	1	1	0	—		8	1
UMass Lowell River Hawks	2021	Div. I	16	3	1	0	–		17	3
UMass Lowell River Hawks	2022	Div. I	17	7	1	0	–		18	7
UMass Lowell River Hawks	2023	Div. I	15	4	3	1	–		18	5
UMass Lowell River Hawks	2024	Div. I	17	4	2	0	–		19	4
UMass Lowell River Hawks	Total		72	19	8	1	–		80	20

=== Club ===
Appearances and goals by club, season and competition
Club	Season	League			National Cup		League Cup		Continental		Total	
Club	Season	Division	Apps	Goals	Apps	Goals	Apps	Goals	Apps	Goals	Apps	Goals
FHL	2025	Besta deild kvenna	20	2	1	0	—		—		21	2
Rangers	2025–26	SWPL	14	3	4	0	2	0	—		20	3
Career Total			34	5	5	0	2	0	—		41	5
