= Ioanna Papatheodorou =

Greek footballer (born 2003)

Personal information
- Full name: Ioanna Papatheodorou
- Date of birth: 27 November 2003 (age 22)
- Place of birth: Athens, Greece
- Height: 5 ft 5 in (1.65 m)
- Position: Forward

Team information
- Current team: Oud-Heverlee Leuven
- Number: 77

Youth career
- 2011–2012: Panerithraikos
- 2012–2015: Kifisia

College career
Years	Team	Apps	(Gls)
2021–2022	UMass Lowell River Hawks	31	(20)
2023–2024	Washington Huskies	39	(12)

Senior career*
Years	Team	Apps	(Gls)
2015–2020	Atromitos		
2022–2024	Nees Atromitou		
2025–	OH Leuven	35	(7)

International career^{‡}
2018–2019	Greece U17	9	(7)
2021–2022	Greece U19	6	(2)
2022–	Greece	15	(0)
- * Club domestic league appearances and goals as of 23 May 2026 ‡ National team caps and goals as of 17 May 2026

Ioanna Papatheodorou (born November 27, 2003) is a Greek professional footballer who plays as a forward for the Belgian Super League club OH Leuven and the Greece women's national team.

== Club career ==
=== Early career ===
Papatheodorou played for her club team, Atromitos FC, based in Athens, Greece. She was selected as a forward to play for the Greece women's national football team in 2020.

=== UMass Lowell ===
In 2021, Papatheodorou played in 16 games, and started in 14. She registered 60 shots and scored a team-high 10 goals for 20 points, and was named America East Rookie of the Year and Striker of the Year, as well as earned America East All-Conference First Team honors. She also won United Soccer Coaches Division I Atlantic All-Region honors.

In 2022, she started in 15 games, registered 52 shots and was the second highest goalscorer in the league with 10 goals. She also made 4 assists for a total of 24 points. As a result, she earned First Team All-America East honors and made the United Soccer Coaches Second Team All-Region.

== Honours ==
OH Leuven

- Belgian Super League (2): 2024–25, 2025–26

=== Individual ===
- AmEast Rookie of the Year: 2021
- AmEast Striker of the Year: 2021
- AmEast All-Conference First Team: 2021, 2022
- NCAA Division I All-Atlantic Region Second Team: 2021
- NEWISA All-New England Second Team: 2022
- Big Ten All-Conference First Team: 2024
- NCAA Division I All-North Region Second Team: 2024
