= 2017 America East Conference women's soccer tournament =

- Classification: Division I
- Teams: 6
- Matches: 5
- Attendance: 2,095
- Site: Campus Sites (Higher Seed)
- Champions: Stony Brook (2nd title)
- Winning coach: Brendan Faherty (1st title)

2017 America East Conference women's soccer standings
	Conf.						Overall
Team	W		L		T	PCT	W		L		T	PCT
New Hampshire † ‍‍‍	5	–	2	–	1	.688	11	–	6	–	1	.639
Binghamton ‍†‍‍	5	–	2	–	1	.688	11	–	4	–	4	.684
Albany ‍‍‍	4	–	3	–	1	.563	6	–	11	–	1	.361
Hartford ‍‍‍	4	–	3	–	1	.563	8	–	9	–	2	.474
Stony Brook ‍‍‡‍^{y}	4	–	4	–	0	.500	11	–	11	–	0	.500
Vermont ‍‍‍	3	–	4	–	1	.438	9	–	9	–	2	.500
Maine ‍‍‍	3	–	5	–	0	.375	5	–	10	–	1	.344
UMass Lowell ‍‍‍	2	–	3	–	3	.438	5	–	6	–	6	.471
UMBC ‍‍‍	2	–	6	–	0	.250	4	–	10	–	3	.324
† – Conference champion ‡ – 2017 America East Tournament champion y – Invited to the NCAA tournament As of November 10, 2017; Rankings from United Soccer Coaches Poll; Source:America East Conference

The 2017 America East Conference women's soccer tournament was the postseason women's soccer tournament for the America East Conference held from October 26 through November 5, 2017. The five-match tournament took place at campus sites, with the higher seed hosting. The six-team single-elimination tournament consisted of three rounds based on seeding from regular season conference play. The defending champions were the Albany Great Danes, but they were eliminated from the 2017 tournament with a 2–1 loss in the quarterfinals to the Vermont Catamounts. The Stony Brook Seawolves won the tournament with a 2–1 victory over the Vermont Catamounts in the final. The conference tournament title was the second for the Stony Brook women's soccer program and the first for head coach Brendan Faherty.

== Bracket ==
Quarterfinals; Thursday, Oct. 26
4	Hartford	0
5	Stony Brook	2
3	Albany	1
6	Vermont	2

Semifinals; Sunday, Oct. 29
1	New Hampshire	0
5	Stony Brook	1
2	Binghamton	0
6	Vermont	1

Final; Sunday, Nov. 5
5	Stony Brook	2
6	Vermont	1

== Schedule ==
=== Quarterfinals ===
October 26, 2017	#4 Hartford	0–2	#5 Stony Brook	West Hartford, Connecticut
6:00 p.m. EDT		Report	11' Allyson Baner; 74' Christen Cahill	Stadium: Al-Marzook Field at Alumni Stadium; Attendance: 357; Referee: Jason Pelletier; Assistant referees: Adam Kilpatrick; Frank Somma; Fourth official: Ed Resendes

October 26, 2017	#3 Albany	1–2	#6 Vermont	Albany, New York
7:00 p.m. EDT	Katie Gowing 63'	Report	36' Taylor Palmer; 90' Brooke Jenkins	Stadium: Casey Stadium; Attendance: 109

=== Semifinals ===
October 29, 2017	#2 Binghamton	0–1	#6 Vermont	Vestal, New York
1:00 p.m. EDT		Report	82' Brooke Jenkins	Stadium: Bearcat Sports Complex; Attendance: 1200; Referee: Yevgeniy Mednikov; Assistant referees: Evan Chase; Joe Kokernak; Fourth official: Dave Carpinella

October 29, 2017	#1 New Hampshire	0–1	#5 Stony Brook	Durham, New Hampshire
2:00 p.m. EDT		Report	76' Manuela Corcho	Stadium: Bremner Field; Attendance: 110; Referee: Mike Wallace; Assistant referees: Naoufal Hmiddouche; Katie Mitchell; Fourth official: Phillip Cox

=== Final ===
November 5, 2017	#5 Stony Brook	2–1	#6 Vermont	Stony Brook, New York
1:00 p.m. EST	Alyssa Francese 18'; Manuela Corcho 33'	Report	62' Sarah Martin	Stadium: LaValle Stadium; Attendance: 319; Referee: Noel Cotterell; Assistant referees: Jeremy Scheer; Danny Marques; Fourth official: Papi Sora

== Statistics ==
=== Goalscorers ===
2 goals

- Manuela Corcho - Stony Brook
- Brooke Jenkins - Vermont

1 goal

- Allyson Baner - Stony Brook
- Christen Cahill - Stony Brook
- Alyssa Francese - Stony Brook
- Katie Gowing - Albany
- Sarah Martin - Vermont
- Taylor Palmer - Vermont

== See also ==
- 2017 America East Conference Men's Soccer Tournament
