= 2021 America East Conference women's soccer tournament =

- Classification: Division I
- Teams: 6
- Matches: 5
- Attendance: 3,589
- Site: Campus Sites (Higher Seed)
- Champions: Vermont (1st title)
- Winning coach: Kristi Huizenga (1st title)
- MVP: Cricket Basa (Vermont)
- Broadcast: America East TV

2021 America East Conference women's soccer standings
	Conf.						Overall
Team	W		L		T	PCT	W		L		T	PCT
Vermont ‍†‍‡‍^{y}	7	–	2	–	0	.778	12	–	6	–	1	.658
UMass Lowell ‍‍‍	5	–	3	–	1	.611	8	–	6	–	3	.559
NJIT ‍‍‍	5	–	3	–	1	.611	7	–	10	–	2	.421
Binghamton ‍‍‍	4	–	3	–	2	.556	8	–	8	–	3	.500
Albany ‍‍‍	4	–	3	–	2	.556	6	–	8	–	4	.444
Stony Brook ‍‍‍	4	–	4	–	1	.500	7	–	8	–	2	.471
New Hampshire ‍‍‍	4	–	4	–	1	.500	6	–	9	–	4	.421
Hartford ‍‍‍	3	–	3	–	3	.500	8	–	4	–	4	.625
Maine ‍‍‍	1	–	6	–	2	.222	3	–	7	–	4	.357
UMBC ‍‍‍	1	–	7	–	1	.167	5	–	9	–	3	.382
† – Conference champion ‡ – 2021 America East Tournament champion y – Invited to the NCAA tournament As of December 7, 2021; Rankings from United Soccer Coaches Poll; Source:America East Conference

The 2021 America East Conference women's soccer tournament was the postseason women's soccer tournament for the America East Conference held from October 31 through November 7, 2021. The five-match tournament took place at campus sites, with the higher seed hosting. The six-team single-elimination tournament consisted of three rounds based on seeding from regular season conference play. The defending champions were the Stony Brook Seawolves, who were unable to defend their title after not qualifying for the tournament. Vermont won their first tournament in program history after a 1–0 victory in the final. It was the first victory for eleventh year head coach Kristi Huizenga. As tournament champions, Vermont earned the America East's automatic berth into the 2021 NCAA Division I Women's Soccer Tournament.

== Seeding ==
The top six teams in the regular season earned a spot in the tournament. UMass Lowell and NJIT finished tied for second in the regular season standings with each team having a record of 5–3–1. UMass Lowell earned the second seed by virtue of their 2–1 regular season win over NJIT on September 19. Binghamton and Albany finished tied for fourth place with each team having a regular season record of 4–3–2. Albany earned the fourth seed by virtue of their 1–0 regular season win over Binghamton on October 28. Stony Brook and New Hampshire tied for the sixth and final place in the tournament with each team having a regular season record of 4–4–1. New Hampshire earned the final spot in the tournament by virtue of their 3–0 regular season win over Stony Brook on October 3.

Seed	School	Conference Record	Points
1	Vermont	7–2–0	21
2	UMass Lowell	5–3–1	16
3	NJIT	5–3–1	16
4	Albany	4–3–2	14
5	Binghamton	4–3–2	14
6	New Hampshire	4–4–1	13

== Bracket ==
Quarterfinals; Sunday, Oct. 31
4	Albany	2
5	Binghamton	0
3	NJIT	0 (4)
6	New Hampshire (pen.)	0 (5)

Semifinals; Thursday, Nov. 4
1	Vermont	3
4	Albany	1
2	UMass Lowell	1 (7)
6	New Hampshire (pen.)	1 (8)

Final; Sunday, Nov. 7
1	Vermont	1
6	New Hampshire	0

== Schedule ==
=== Quarterfinals ===
October 31, 2021	#3 NJIT	0–0 (a.e.t.) (4–5 p)	#6 New Hampshire	Newark, New Jersey
1:00 p.m.	Madison Taibl (yellow card) 34'; Christine Conaghy (yellow card) 90'	Report	(yellow card) 42' Molly McHugh	Stadium: J. Malcolm Simon Stadium; Attendance: 277; Referee: David Breckner; Assistant referees: Joe Zawistowski; Ronnie Tamburro; Fourth official: Hector Rueda
	Penalties
	Nora O'Connor (penalty missed); Caroline Caputo (penalty scored); Bailey Chant (penalty scored); Whitney Roth (penalty scored); Lauren Chamberlain (penalty missed); Aleesha Deshmukh (penalty scored); Tara Walenczyk (penalty missed)		(penalty scored) Julie Cane; (penalty missed) Casey Peterson; (penalty scored) Anna Hewlett; (penalty scored) Emily Bini; (penalty missed) Cat Sheppard; (penalty scored) Keegan Mayer; (penalty scored) Megan Guarente

October 31, 2021	#4 Albany	2–0	#5 Binghamton	Albany, New York
3:00 p.m.	Jada Colbert 61'; Brooke Pickett 75'	Report	(yellow card) 48' Maya Anand; (yellow card) 62' Emma Colling	Stadium: Mary Casey Stadium; Attendance: 223

=== Semifinals ===
November 4, 2021	#1 Vermont	3–1	#4 Albany	Burlington, Vermont
6:00 p.m.	Karen Wallace 34', 64'; Alex West 52'	Report	21' (pen.) Jasmine Colbert; (yellow card) 56' Joanna Van Royen	Stadium: Virtue Field; Attendance: 797; Referee: Daniel Shenk-Moreno; Assistant referees: Marc Pepin; Jaime LaBarge; Fourth official: Ben Stuart

November 4, 2021	#2 UMass Lowell	1–1 (a.e.t.) (7–8 p)	#6 New Hampshire	Lowell, Massachusetts
7:00 p.m.	Hailey DuBose 59'	Report	80' Anna Hewlett	Stadium: Cushing Field Complex; Attendance: 275; Referee: Carlos Fernandes; Assistant referees: Katherine Mitchell-Moreno; Sean Regan; Fourth official: Matt Stein
	Penalties
	Halle Anderson (penalty missed); Emily Nelson (penalty scored); Anna Edson (penalty scored); Dunja Mostarac (penalty scored); Ioanna Papatheodorou (penalty missed); Marissa Saucedo (penalty scored); Hailey DuBose (penalty scored); Calliste Brookshire (penalty scored); Allison LeBlanc (penalty scored); Olivia Sandahl (penalty missed)		(penalty missed) Julie Cane; (penalty scored) Anna Hewlett; (penalty missed) Emily Bini; (penalty scored) Meghan Guarente; (penalty scored) Alivia Kelly; (penalty scored) Keegan Mayer; (penalty scored) Ella Dudley; (penalty scored) Shayna Salis; (penalty scored) Logan Nicholson; (penalty scored) Casey Peterson

=== Final ===
November 7, 2021	#1 Vermont	1–0	#6 New Hampshire	Burlington, Vermont
	Bailey Ayer (yellow card) 70'; Cricket Basa 80'	Report		Stadium: Virtue Field; Attendance: 2,017; Referee: Lorent Varga; Assistant referees: Marc Pepin; Jim Meyers; Fourth official: Larry Bechard

== Statistics ==
=== Goalscorers ===
There were 8 goals scored in 5 matches, for an average of 1.6 goals per match (as of November 7, 2021).

2 goals

- Karen Wallace – Vermont

1 goal

- Cricket Basa – Vermont
- Jada Colbert – Albany
- Jasmine Colbert – Albany
- Hailey DuBose – UMass Lowell
- Anna Hewlett – New Hampshire
- Brooke Pickett – Albany
- Alex West – Vermont

== All-Tournament team ==
Player	Team
**Cricket Basa**	Vermont
Lydia Kessel	Vermont
Karen Wallace	Vermont
Alex West	Vermont
Cat Sheppard	New Hampshire
Fracesca Picicci	New Hampshire
Casey Peterson	New Hampshire
Lisa Sjögren	UMass Lowell
Halle Anderson	UMass Lowell
Devon Scmitt	Albany
Jada Colbert	Albany
Haylee Poltorak	Binghamton
Siani Magruder	NJIT

MVP in bold
