= 2018 America East Conference women's soccer tournament =

- Classification: Division I
- Teams: 6
- Matches: 5
- Attendance: 1,491
- Site: Campus Sites (Higher Seed)
- Champions: Albany (3rd title)
- Winning coach: Caitlin Cucchiella (3rd title)
- Broadcast: America East TV

2018 America East Conference women's soccer standings
	Conf.						Overall
Team	W		L		T	PCT	W		L		T	PCT
Stony Brook ‍†‍‍	6	–	1	–	1	.813	11	–	7	–	1	.605
Hartford ‍†‍‍	6	–	1	–	1	.813	13	–	3	–	2	.778
Albany ‍‍‡‍^{y}	5	–	2	–	1	.688	13	–	6	–	2	.667
UMass Lowell ‍‍‍	4	–	3	–	1	.563	8	–	8	–	4	.500
Vermont ‍‍‍	4	–	3	–	1	.563	6	–	9	–	3	.417
New Hampshire ‍‍‍	3	–	4	–	1	.438	7	–	9	–	2	.444
Binghamton ‍‍‍	2	–	6	–	0	.250	7	–	9	–	2	.444
Maine ‍‍‍	2	–	6	–	0	.250	6	–	9	–	1	.406
UMBC ‍‍‍	1	–	7	–	0	.125	2	–	15	–	0	.118
† – Conference champion ‡ – 2018 America East Tournament champion y – Invited to the NCAA Tournament; As of November 7, 2018; Rankings from United Soccer Coaches Poll; Source:America East Conference

The 2018 America East Conference women's soccer tournament was the postseason women's soccer tournament for the America East Conference held from October 25 through November 4, 2018. The five-match tournament took place at campus sites, with the higher seed hosting. The six-team single-elimination tournament consisted of three rounds based on seeding from regular season conference play. The defending champions were the Stony Brook Seawolves, who were unable to defend their title after losing in the Quarterfinals to UMass Lowell. Albany won their third tournament in 4 years after a 5–1 victory in the final.

== Bracket ==
Quarterfinals; Thursday, Oct. 25
4	UMass Lowell	0 (4)
5	Vermont	0 (3)
3	Albany	1
6	New Hampshire	0

Semifinals; Sunday, Oct. 28
1	Stony Brook	0
4	UMass Lowell	2
2	Hartford	0
3	Albany	1

Final; Sunday, Nov. 4
4	UMass Lowell	1
3	Albany	5

== Schedule ==
=== Quarterfinals ===
October 25, 2018	#4 UMass Lowell	0–0 (a.e.t.) (4–3 p)	#5 Vermont	Lowell, MA
7:00 p.m. EDT		Report	A Oviedo (yellow card) 51'	Stadium: Cushing Field Complex; Attendance: 351; Referee: Carlos Fernandes; Assistant referees: Jordan Rich; Papi Sora; Fourth official: Bailey Knecht
	Penalties
	K. Birgisdottir (penalty scored); D. Mostarac (penalty scored); K. Vieira (penalty scored); K. Bartsch (penalty scored)		K. Lambertson (penalty scored); C. Garfinkel (penalty scored); B. Jenkins (penalty missed); A. Keimel (penalty scored); E. Bankert (penalty missed)

October 25, 2018	#3 Albany	1–0	#6 New Hampshire	Albany, NY
7:00 p.m. EDT	M. Williams 6'	Report	M. Rumbold (yellow card) 88'	Stadium: Casey Stadium; Attendance: 311

=== Semifinals ===
October 28, 2018	#1 Stony Brook	0–2	#4 UMass Lowell	Stony Brook, NY
12:00 p.m. EDT		Report	L. Fabian 59'; K. Vieira 87'	Stadium: LaValle Stadium; Attendance: 223; Referee: Danny Marques; Assistant referees: Alex Casella; Wilmer Melendez; Fourth official: Kevin Skaalerud

October 28, 2018	#2 Hartford	0–1	#3 Albany	Hartfort, CT
1:00 p.m. EDT		Report	M. Williams 78'	Stadium: Al-Marzook Field at Alumni Stadium; Attendance: 303; Referee: Victor Matheson; Assistant referees: Tom Felice; Eric Forrest; Fourth official: Ronald Packard

=== Final ===
November 4, 2018	#3 Albany	5–1	#4 UMass Lowell	Albany, NY
1:00 p.m. EST	Jada Colbert 1'; Jasmine Colbert 19', 60'; Meghan Cavanaugh 78'; Christina Cernuto 87'	Report	Lily Fabian 75'	Stadium: Casey Stadium; Attendance: 303; Referee: Victor Matheson; Assistant referees: Tom Felice; Eric Forrest; Fourth official: Ronald Packard

== Statistics ==
=== Goalscorers ===
2 Goals

- Jasmine Colbert - Albany
- Lily Fabian - Stony Brook
- Mariah Williams - Albany

1 Goal

- Meghan Cavanaugh - Albany
- Christina Cernuto - Albany
- Jada Colbert - Albany
- Katelyn Vieira - Stony Brook

== See also ==
- 2018 America East Men's Soccer Tournament
