= Zenoni (surname) =

Zenoni is a surname. Notable people with the surname include:

- Anne Zenoni (born 1971), French footballer
- Damiano Zenoni (born 1977), Italian footballer
- Cristian Zenoni (born 1977), Italian footballer
- Kyle Zenoni (born 1984), American soccer player

== See also ==
- Zenonis, Byzantine empress
