= Pat Meiser =

American basketball coach

Patricia H. Meiser
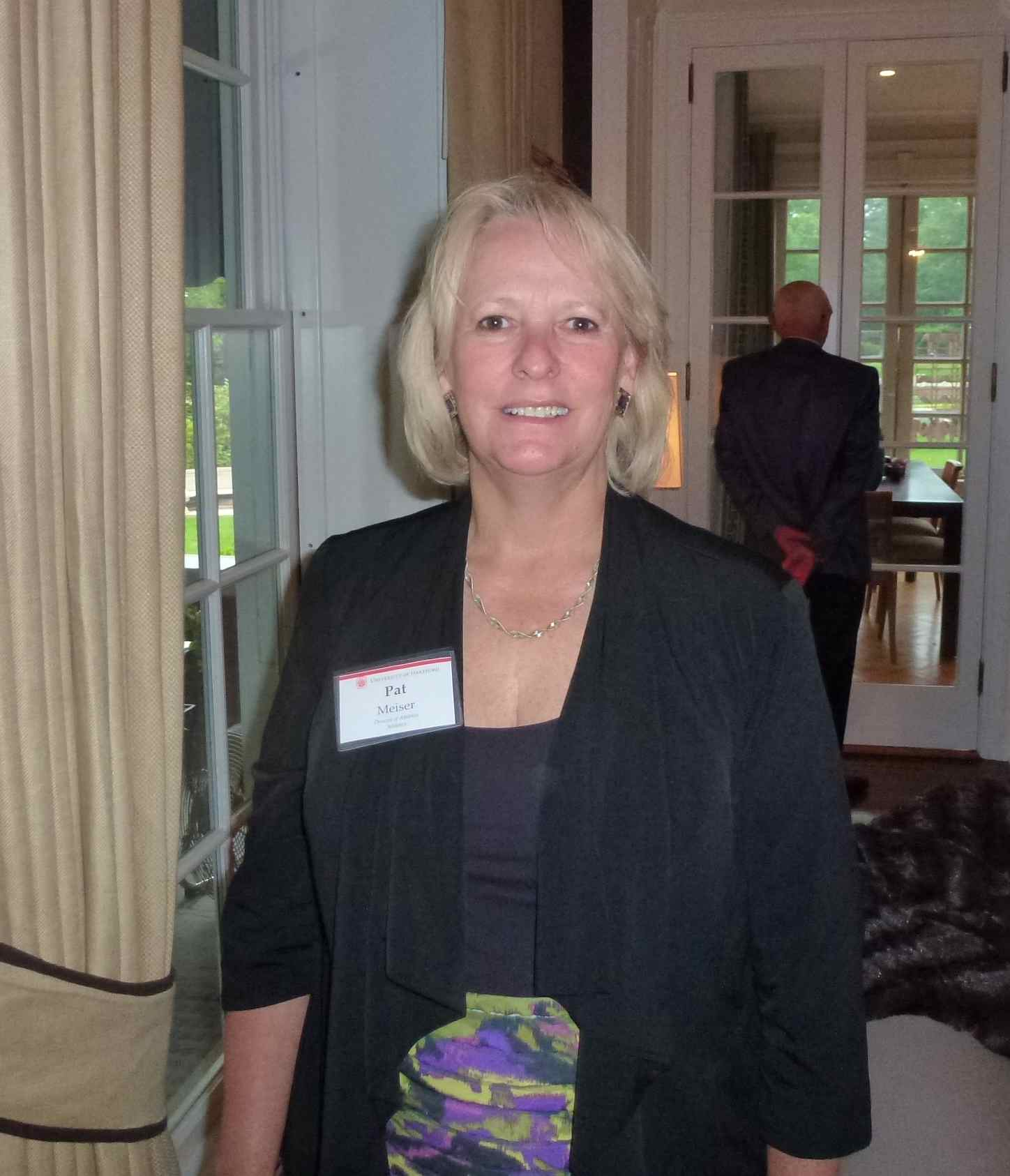

Biographical details
- Born: Lancaster, Pennsylvania, U.S.
- Education: West Chester University

Coaching career (HC unless noted)
- 1974–1980: Penn State

Administrative career (AD unless noted)
- 1983–1993: UConn (assoc. AD)
- 1993–2014: Hartford

Head coaching record
- Overall: 92–52 (.639)

Pat Meiser is an American college women's basketball coach. She is best known for her 6-year run as head coach of Penn State, in which she compiled a 92–52 record. Following that, she became the athletics director at the University of Hartford. She was named one of the nation's top 50 women's sports executives by Street and Smith's Sports Business Journal. She has also worked as the associate athletic director at the University of Connecticut.

== Early years ==
Meiser grew up in Lancaster, Pennsylvania. The rowhouse where she lived was adjacent to the athletic field of Stevens Trade School, which gave her the opportunity to play a lot of sports. She played baseball, basketball, and tennis. She partnered with her sister to play doubles tennis for her high school.

Meiser attended West Chester University where she graduated, in 1969, with a bachelor's degree in health and physical education. She then went on to Penn State, where she completed a master's degree in education in 1971 and an MBA in 1986.

== Penn State ==
Meiser was hired to be a basketball coach at Penn State. She was the coach of the Nittany Lions junior varsity basketball team, then became the head coach of the varsity team in 1974. She served as head coach for six seasons, with a 92–52 overall record. The team competed in the AIAW post-season tournament each year. In 1974, Meiser offered a scholarship to Mag Strittmatter, the first women's basketball scholarship offered at Penn State. Strittmatter would go on to lead the team in rebounds in each of her four-year, and averaged 10.3 rebounds per game, a school record that still stands. Strittmatter went on to become the executive director of an organization that assists disadvantaged people in Denver.

== University of Connecticut ==
Meiser joined the athletic department at the University of Connecticut (UConn) in 1983, where she would remain for ten years, serving as an associate athletics director for administration and senior women's administrator. At the time, the women's basketball team was not well-respected, having recently transitioned from a club sport to a varsity sport, but the team had single digit wins in the last four seasons under coach Jean Balthaser, going 9–18, 9–20, 9–18, and 9–18 between 1981 and 1983, with only a single win in Big East play in 1982–83. According to Meiser, the school administration wanted to make a change, and believed the women's basketball team could be the "vanguard women's sports program at UConn, the kind of program that could move the whole movement for equality forward". Meiser chaired the search committee to find a new women's basketball coach, and ended up hiring Geno Auriemma, who has gone on to the lead the team to nine national championships, as of 2014. She would later describe Auriemma as the type of coach who could call on a recruit at her home, and "walk out the door with the family's dog in his arms". The basketball team did not charge for admission in the early years. Meiser proposed to the Athletic Director Lew Perkins, in 1990 that the team should charge for admission. Although initially skeptical, they tried it, and earned $53,000 in revenue. It did not hurt that they chose a year in which the team would be good enough to make it to the Final Four.

== University of Hartford ==
In 1993, Meiser was named the athletic director at Hartford. At the time, she was one of only twelve female athletic directors of Division I schools.

== Year by year results ==
Record table
Season	Team	Overall	Conference	Standing	Postseason
Penn State Lady Lions (Independent) (1974–1980)
1974–1975	Penn State	7–7			AIAW
1975–1976	Penn State	10–10			AIAW
1976–1977	Penn State	13–8			AIAW
1977–1978	Penn State	21–5			AIAW
1978–1979	Penn State	21–8			AIAW
1979–1980	Penn State	20–14			AIAW
Penn State:		92–52 (.639)			
Total:		95–52 (.646)			
National champion Postseason invitational champion Conference regular season champion Conference regular season and conference tournament champion Division regular season champion Division regular season and conference tournament champion Conference tournament champion
