= Mary Ellen Gillespie =

Biographical details
- Born: Sayville, New York, U.S.
- Education: State University of New York at Plattsburgh

Administrative career (AD unless noted)
- 2006–2013: Bowling Green (Associate AD)
- 2013–2017: Green Bay
- 2017–2019: Hartford

Mary Ellen Gillespie is an American former college athletics administrator. She previously served as athletic director for the University of Hartford from 2017 to 2019, the University of Wisconsin–Green Bay from 2013 to 2017, and as an associate athletic director at Bowling Green State University from 2006 to 2013. Gillespie graduated from the State University of New York at Plattsburgh with both bachelor's and master's degrees. Gillespie was named athletic director at the University of Hartford on May 23, 2017. On January 16, 2020, it was announced that Gillespie would join the Women's Basketball Coaches Association as a Deputy Director beginning March 2, following her resignation as Athletic Director at the University of Hartford in October 2019.

== Controversies ==
Gillespie was placed on Administrative leave on September 27, 2019, this comes days after a former volleyball player at the school filed a lawsuit claiming that her coach berated and sexually harassed her on and off the court, causing her to develop an eating disorder and drop out of school. On October 19, 2019, Gillespie resigned as athletic director at the University of Hartford. Following her tenure as Athletic Director, the University of Hartford moved from Division I to Division III due to financial problems.
