= Grant Family Track and Field =

- Interactive map of Grant Family Track and Field
- Location: Hartford, Connecticut
- Owner: University of Hartford

Construction
- Built: 2024
- Opened: 2024

Tenant
- Hartford Hawks (NCAA)

The Grant Family Track and Field is a multi-purpose stadium located on the University of Hartford campus in Hartford, Connecticut.

The Grant Family Track and Field is home to the University of Hartford's men's and women's track and field teams. The stadium was named after Hartford alum and board of regent's member Kevin Grant who donated one million dollars to the project, as well as Alumni and friends of the university. Donations from corporate partners include Stanley Black & Decker, CVS/Aetna, and Robinson & Cole LLP. It is and eight lane rubber track with a field hockey field inside the track, and six light banks.
