= UMass Lowell River Hawks men's soccer =

Soccer team at the University of Massachusetts Lowell

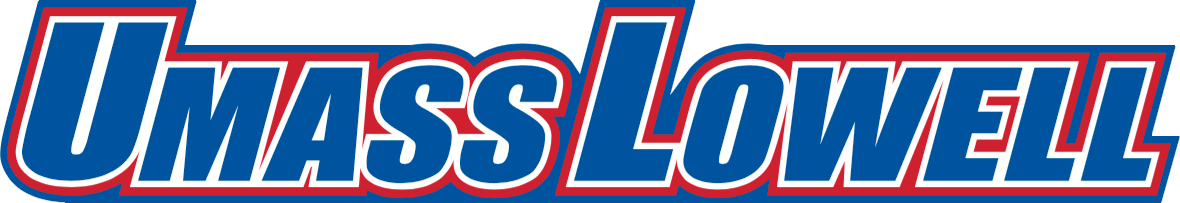
- Founded: 1976; 50 years ago
- University: University of Massachusetts Lowell
- Head coach: Kyle Zenoni (5th season)
- Conference: America East
- Location: Lowell, Massachusetts, US
- Stadium: Cushing Field Complex (capacity: 800)
- Nickname: Hawks
- Colors: Blue, white, and red
Home	Away

NCAA tournament Quarterfinals
- D-II; 2003, 2008

NCAA tournament Round of 16
- D-II; 2003, 2008

NCAA tournament Round of 32
- D-II; 2003, 2008, 2012

NCAA tournament appearances
- D-II; 2003, 2004, 2007, 2008, 2012

Conference tournament championships
- D-II Northeast 10; 2003, 2004

Conference regular season championships
- D-II Northeast 10; 2008 D-I America East; 2016

The UMass Lowell River Hawks men's soccer program represents University of Massachusetts Lowell in all NCAA Division I men's college soccer competitions. The River Hawks compete in the America East Conference. The program began in 1976.

== History ==
The River Hawks spent most of their history playing in NCAA Division II before transitioning to Division I in the early 2010s. The program achieved national success in 2016, when in their final year of transition, were ranked as high as 13th in the nation. The River Hawks were ineligible to participate in the America East Conference Men's Soccer Tournament or the NCAA Division I Men's Soccer Championship due to transitioning from Division II to I. In the River Hawks first year of eligibility, they reached the final of the tournament, but lost to Albany in Double Overtime.

The River Hawks are presently coached by Kyle Zenoni.

== Roster ==
As of 29 Sep 2024

Note: Flags indicate national team as defined under FIFA eligibility rules; some limited exceptions apply. Players may hold more than one non-FIFA nationality.

No.	Pos.	Nation	Player
1	GK	USA	Daniele Di Giorgio
2	DF	JPN	Kotaro Natsume
3	DF	JPN	Rui Aoki
4	MF	ARG	Santiago Delfino
5	DF	ESP	Oscar Perez
6	MF	JPN	Shunnosuke Nakajima
7	FW	USA	Jonathan Ferreira
8	MF	ESP	Guillermo Francés
9	FW	FRA	Yanis Lakhlifi
10	FW	ARG	Iñaki Esnaola

No.	Pos.	Nation	Player
11	MF	USA	Liam Ireland
14	MF	USA	Mauro Fernandez
15	MF	GER	Jona Starek
16	MF	CAN	Saihaj Kailay
17	FW	BRA	Jean Leonardo
18	MF	USA	Owen Marshall
19	FW	ARG	Martin Harguindey
20	MF	CAN	Cristiano Da Silva
21	MF	SWE	Oliver Holmstrom
28	FW	NED	Calvin Scholten

== Seasons ==
Below is UMass Lowell's records since 2000.

Record table
Season	Coach	Overall	Conference	Standing	Postseason
Northeast-10 Conference (D–II) (2000–2012)
2000	Ted Priestly	10–7–3	6–4–3	6th	NE10 Quarterfinals
2001	Ted Priestly	13–5–0	9–4–0	4th	NE10 Semifinals
2002	Ted Priestly	13–5–2	8–3–2	5th	NE10 Final
2003	Ted Priestly	15–5–2	9–4–0	3rd	NE10 Champions; NCAA D-II Quarterfinals
2004	Ted Priestly	15–3–2	11–2–0	3rd	NE10 Champions; NCAA D-II First Round
2005	Ted Priestly	10–5–4	8–4–1	5th	NE10 Semifinals
2006	Ted Priestly	5–3–5	7–4–6	6th	NE10 Quarterfinals
2007	Ted Priestly	12–4–4	10–2–1	2nd	NE10 Semifinals; NCAA D-II Second Round
2008	Ted Priestly	13–4–4	9–1–3	1st	NE10 Semifinals; NCAA D-II Quarterfinals
2009	Bryan Scales	4–12–0	3–10–0	12th	
2010	Bryan Scales	3–11–2	2–9–2	13th	
2011	Bryan Scales; Christian Figueroa	11–7–0	9–4–0	T–3rd	NE10 Semifinals
2012	Christian Figueroa	15–6–1	10–3–0	3rd	NE10 Semifinals; NCAA D-II Third Round
NE-10 Total:		139–77–29	101–54–18		
America East Conference (D–I) (2013–present)
2013	Christian Figueroa	3–14–1	1–5–1	8th	Ineligible
2014	Christian Figueroa	8–9–1	4–2–1	3rd	Ineligible
2015	Christian Figueroa	7–9–1	2–4–1	7th	Ineligible
2016	Christian Figueroa	13–1–2	5–1–1	1st	Ineligible
2017	Christian Figueroa	10–7–1	5–2–0	2nd	Am. East Final
2018	Christian Figueroa	10–5–2	4–3–0	T–3rd	Am. East Semifinals
A-East Total:		51–45–8	21–17–4		
Total:		190–122–37			
National champion Postseason invitational champion Conference regular season champion Conference regular season and conference tournament champion Division regular season champion Division regular season and conference tournament champion Conference tournament champion
