= Kyle Zenoni =

American soccer player and coach

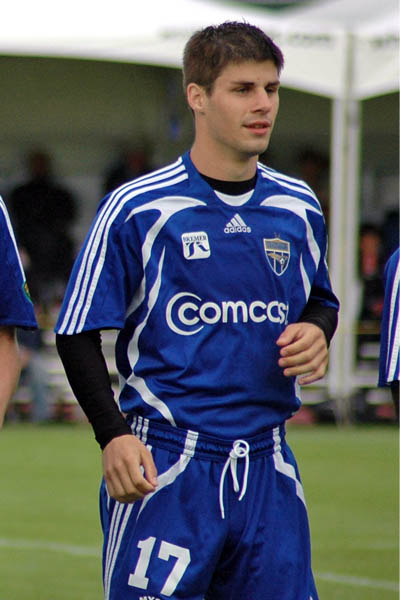

Personal information
- Full name: Kyle Ross Zenoni
- Date of birth: February 16, 1984 (age 42)
- Place of birth: Hartland, Wisconsin, United States
- Height: 5 ft 10 in (1.78 m)
- Position: Midfielder

Senior career*
Years	Team	Apps	(Gls)
2007	Minnesota Thunder	20	(0)
2008	La Paz F.C.	1	(0)

Managerial career
- 2022–: UMass Lowell
- * Club domestic league appearances and goals as of April 4, 2008

Kyle Zenoni (born February 16, 1984, in Hartland, Wisconsin) is a former American soccer player and current soccer coach who last played for Bolivian side La Paz F.C., after a switch from USL First Division club Minnesota Thunder. He is the head men's soccer coach of the UMass Lowell River Hawks.

== Biography ==
Zenoni attended college at the University of Wisconsin–Milwaukee. He captained the Panthers in 2005. He appeared in all 23 games at the mid-field position, making 22 starts. He scored 10 goals in four years, taking 71 shots. Kyle had 8 assists while playing at UWM and started 59 out of 83 games. Zenoni was then selected by the Chicago Storm in the second round of the 2006 Major Indoor Soccer League draft.

After a brief stint in Europe, particularly in Sweden and Ireland, Kyle returned to the United States to play for the Minnesota Thunder in the United Soccer League (USL) First Division.

On December 25, 2007, Zenoni signed for La Paz in order to strengthen their squad for the upcoming Copa Libertadores, the principal competition for South American club teams. He was the only foreign footballer playing for La Paz, and currently coaches in his home state of Wisconsin.
