= 2022 America East Conference women's soccer tournament =

- Classification: Division I
- Teams: 6
- Matches: 5
- Attendance: 2,275
- Site: Campus Sites (Higher Seed)
- Champions: New Hampshire (2nd title)
- Winning coach: Steve Welham (2nd title)
- MVP: Cat Sheppard (New Hampshire)
- Broadcast: America East TV

2022 America East Conference women's soccer standings
	Conf.						Overall
Team	W		L		T	PCT	W		L		T	PCT
Binghamton ‍†‍‍	6	–	1	–	1	.813	9	–	5	–	5	.605
New Hampshire ‍‍‡‍^{y}	5	–	1	–	2	.750	9	–	6	–	3	.583
Maine ‍‍‍	4	–	0	–	4	.750	9	–	3	–	5	.676
UMass Lowell ‍‍‍	4	–	2	–	2	.625	7	–	7	–	4	.500
Albany ‍‍‍	3	–	2	–	3	.563	7	–	8	–	5	.475
NJIT ‍‍‍	2	–	4	–	2	.375	5	–	8	–	6	.421
UMBC ‍‍‍	1	–	5	–	2	.250	5	–	8	–	4	.412
Vermont ‍‍‍	0	–	5	–	3	.188	4	–	9	–	3	.344
Bryant ‍‍‍	0	–	5	–	3	.188	3	–	10	–	4	.294
† – Conference champion ‡ – 2022 America East Tournament champion y – Invited to the NCAA Tournament; As of December 6, 2022; Rankings from United Soccer Coaches Poll; Source:America East Conference

The 2022 America East Conference women's soccer tournament was the postseason women's soccer tournament for the America East Conference held from October 30 through November 6, 2022. The five-match tournament took place at campus sites, with the higher seed hosting. The six-team single-elimination tournament consisted of three rounds based on seeding from regular season conference play. The defending champions were the Vermont Catamounts, who were unable to defend their title after not qualifying for the tournament. New Hampshire won their second tournament in program history after a penalty shoot-out victory in the final. It was the second victory for ninth year head coach Steve Welham. As tournament champions, New Hampshire earned the America East's automatic berth into the 2022 NCAA Division I women's soccer tournament.

== Seeding ==
The top six teams in the regular season earned a spot in the tournament. No tiebreakers were required as each team finished with a unique regular season record.

Seed	School	Conference Record	Points
1	Binghamton	6–1–1	19
2	New Hampshire	5–1–2	17
3	Maine	4–0–4	16
4	UMass Lowell	4–2–2	14
5	Albany	3–2–3	12
6	NJIT	2–4–2	8

== Bracket ==
Quarterfinals; Sunday, Oct. 30
3	Maine	4
6	NJIT	1
4	UMass Lowell	1
5	Albany	3

Semifinals; Thursday, Nov. 3
2	New Hampshire	2
3	Maine	1
1	Binghamton (pen.)	3 (3)
5	Albany	3 (2)

Final; Sunday, Nov. 6
2	New Hampshire (pen.)	4 (3)
1	Binghamton	4 (2)

== Schedule ==
=== Quarterfinals ===
October 30	#4 UMass Lowell	1–3	#5 Albany	Lowell, MA
4:00 p.m.	Chloe Layne 55'	Report	35', 78', (yellow card) 87' Olivia Piranino; 74' (pen.) Marisa Tava	Stadium: Cushing Field; Attendance: 307; Referee: Daniel Shenk-Moreno; Assistant referees: Katherin Mitchell-Moreno; Miguel Lara; Fourth official: John Jordan

October 30	#3 Maine	4–1	#6 NJIT	Orono, ME
5:00 p.m.	Emma Donovan 11'; Saylor Clark 24'; Julie Lossius 69'; Abby Kraemer 85'	Report	(yellow card) 34' Siani Magruder; 68' Briana Andreoli	Stadium: Mahaney Diamond; Attendance: 357; Referee: Leah Hayes; Assistant referees: Jeffery Davis; Andrew Porada; Fourth official: Charles Brown

=== Semifinals ===
November 3	#1 Binghamton	3–3 (a.e.t.) (3–2 p)	#5 Albany	Vestal, NY
6:00 p.m.	Olivia McKnight 9', 80'; Lexi Vegoda (yellow card) 51'; Maya Anand (yellow card) 72', (goal) 94'	Report	48', 99' Joanna Van Royen; 58' Selma Elverum	Stadium: Bearcats Sports Complex; Attendance: 407; Referee: Mike DeFelice; Assistant referees: Joseph Cimino; Ryan Clauss; Fourth official: Yale Wale
	Penalties
	Olivia McKnight (penalty scored); Lexi Vegoda (penalty scored); Molly McClelland (penalty scored); Samiya Reid (penalty missed)		(penalty scored) Marisa Tava; (penalty scored) Carly Binn; (penalty missed) Joanna Van Royen; (penalty missed) Olivia Piraino; (penalty missed) Sahara Zingano

November 3	#2 New Hampshire	2–1	#3 Maine	Durham, NH
6:00 p.m.	Abbi Maier 21', 86'	Report	38' Julie Lossius	Stadium: Wildcat Stadium; Attendance: 483; Referee: Yevgeniy Mednikov; Assistant referees: Ernesto Rodriguez; John Luk; Fourth official: Erik Rossetti

=== Final ===
November 6	#1 Binghamton	4–4 (a.e.t.) (2–3 p)	#2 New Hampshire	Vestal, NY
2:00 p.m.	Maya Anand 11', (yellow card) 76'; Lexi Vegoda 51', 54' (pen.), (yellow card) 76'; Samiya Reid 84'	Report	9', 26' Meghan Guarente; 18', (yellow card) 81' Emily Bini; 30' Gudrun Haralz; (yellow card) 56' Logan Nicholson; (yellow card) 64' Keegan Mayer	Stadium: Bearcats Sports Complex; Attendance: 721; Referee: Tony Russo; Assistant referees: Cody Hack; Chris Scalza; Fourth official: Mike Cronin
	Penalties
	Molly McClelland (penalty scored); Lexi Vegoda (penalty scored); Victoria McKnight (penalty missed); Samiya Reid (penalty missed); Nicole Rago (penalty missed)		(penalty scored) Meghan Guarente; (penalty scored) Maddy Warren; (penalty missed) Keegan Mayer; (penalty missed) Whitney Wiley; (penalty scored) Abbi Maier

== Statistics ==
=== Goalscorers ===
There were 26 goals scored in 5 matches, for an average of 5.2 goals per match (as of November 6, 2022).

2 goals

- Maya Anand – Binghamton
- Olivia McKnight – Binghamton
- Lexi Vegoda – Binghamton
- Julie Lossius – Maine
- Megan Guarente – New Hampshire
- Abbi Maier – New Hampshire
- Olivia Piranino – UAlbany
- Joanna Van Royen – UAlbany

1 goal

- Samiya Reid – Binghamton
- Saylor Clark – Maine
- Emma Donovan – Maine
- Abby Kraemer – Maine
- Emily Bini – New Hampshire
- Gudrun Harlaz – New Hampshire
- Briana Andreoli – NJIT
- Selma Elverum – UAlbany
- Marisa Tava – UAlbany
- Chole Layne – UMass Lowell

== All-Tournament team ==
Player	Team
Emily Bini	New Hampshire
Meghan Guarantee	New Hampshire
Abbi Maier	New Hampshire
**Cat Sheppard**	New Hampshire
Maya Anand	Binghamton
Olivia McKnight	Binghamton
Nicole Scott	Binghamton
Hannah Bamford	Maine
Saylor Clark	Maine
Megan Hart	Albany
Olivia Piraino	Albany
Lily Fabian	UMass Lowell
Ciara Adams	NJIT

MVP in bold
