= Al-Marzook Field at Alumni Stadium =

Alumni Stadium at University of Hartford

Coordinates: 41.80339°N 72.71624°W

Al-Marzook Field

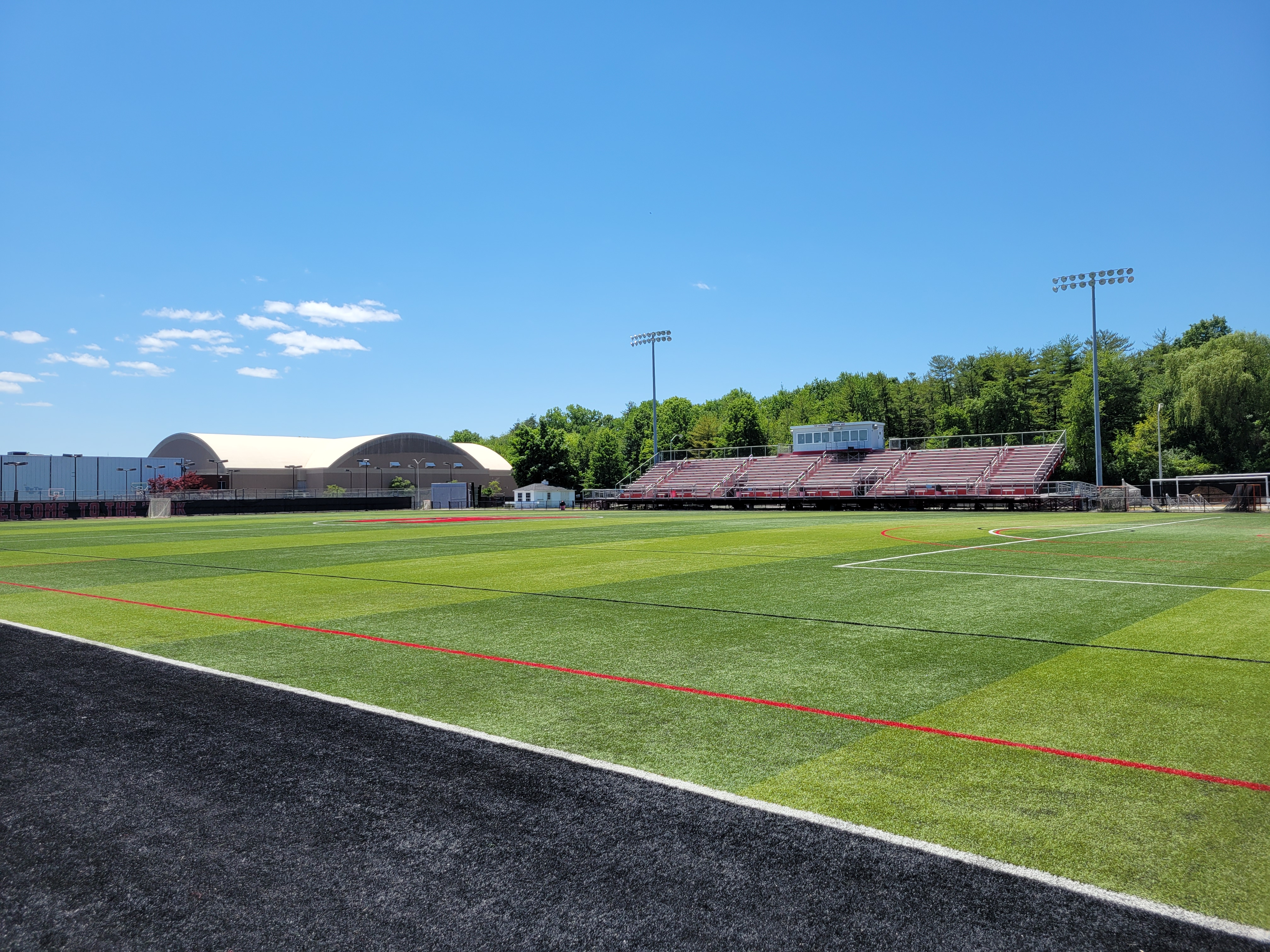
- The stadium in 2024
- Interactive map of Al-Marzook Field
- Full name: Al-Marzook Field at Alumni Stadium
- Address: Hartford, Connecticut; United States
- Owner: University of Hartford
- Operator: University of Hartford Athletics
- Capacity: 2,500
- Surface: FieldTurf
- Current use: Soccer; Lacrosse

Construction
- Opened: October 15, 1977; 49 years ago

Tenants
- Hartford Hawks soccer (NCAA); Hartford Hawks lacrosse (NCAA); Hartford City FC (NPSL) (2019–2021)

Website
- hartfordhawks.com/al-marzook-field

Al-Marzook Field at Alumni Stadium officially known as Yousuf Al-Marzook Field at Alumni Stadium is the on campus lacrosse and soccer stadium at the University of Hartford in Hartford, Connecticut. In 2019 it was the home stadium for Hartford City FC of the National Premier Soccer League.

The stadium opened on October 15, 1977 and utilizes artificial turf. It was renovated in 2005.

== Notable matches ==
=== Soccer ===
Date	Home team	Score	Away team	Event	Att.	Ref.
1999	Hartford	2–0	Towson	1999 AmEast tournament men's final	-	
Oct 30, 2016	Hartford	1–0	Vermont	2016 AmEast tournament women's semifinal	277	
Oct 26, 2017	Hartford	0–2	Stony Brook	2017 AmEast tournament women's quarterfinal	357	
Oct 28, 2018	Hartford	0–1	Albany	2017 AmEast tournament women's semifinal	303	
May 14, 2019	Hartford Athletic (Connecticut)	2–1	(New York (state)) New York Cosmos B	2019 U.S. Open Cup	400	
