= Hartford Hawks =

Athletic teams of the University of Hartford

- University: University of Hartford
- Nickname: Hawks
- NCAA: Division III (Note: Scheduled to drop to Division III no later than September 1, 2025.)
- Conference: Conference of New England (primary)
- Athletic director: Alicia Queally
- Location: West Hartford, Connecticut, U.S.
- Varsity teams: 18
- Basketball arena: Chase Arena at Reich Family Pavilion
- Baseball stadium: Fiondella Field Dunkin' Park
- Softball stadium: Hartford Softball Field
- Soccer stadium: Al-Marzook Field at Alumni Stadium
- Lacrosse stadium: Al-Marzook Field at Alumni Stadium
- Outdoor track and field venue: Grant Family Track and Field
- Colors: Scarlet and white
- Mascot: Howie the Hawk
- Fight song: "Fly High"
- Website: hartfordhawks.com

Individual and relay NCAA champions
- 1

The Hartford Hawks are the NCAA Division III athletic teams of the University of Hartford, located in West Hartford, Connecticut. Hartford sponsors teams in eight men's and ten women's NCAA sanctioned sports.

== Overview ==
=== Division III ===
On May 6, 2021, the University of Hartford Board of Regents voted to drop its athletic department to Division III. This plan started with the university's formal application to the NCAA for reclassification in January 2022. Starting in 2022–23, Hartford would no longer award athletic scholarships to incoming students, and begin playing as a Division I independent. In 2023–24, the school would become a provisional member of a Division III conference, and transition all remaining student-athletes off athletic aid by the end of that school year.

=== Conference of New England ===
On June 21, 2022, the Commonwealth Coast Conference, now known as the Conference of New England, announced that Hartford would become a full D-III member on September 1, 2025.

== Sports sponsored ==
Men's sports	Women's sports
Baseball	Basketball
Basketball	Cross country
Cross country	Field hockey
Golf	Golf
Lacrosse	Lacrosse
Soccer	Soccer
Tennis	Tennis
Track and field^{†}	Softball
	Track and field^{†}
	Volleyball
† – Track and field includes both indoor and outdoor.

=== Men's cross country ===
==== Division III ====
Conference of New England Champions	2026

=== Men's golf ===
==== Division I ====
America East Champions	1988, 1989, 1991, 1992, 1993, 1994, 1995, 2001, 2002, 2004, 2006, 2007

==== Division III ====
Conference of New England Champions	2025, 2026

=== Men's soccer ===
NCAA Tournament appearances	1991, 1992, 1996, 1999
America East Tournament Champions	1989, 1991, 1992, 1999
America East Regular Season Champions	1996, 1999

=== Men's outdoor track & field ===
Conference of New England Champions	2025, 2026

=== Men's tennis ===
America East Champions	1989, 1990, 1994–1995, 2001–2002

=== Women's golf ===
America East Champions	2005

==== Division III ====
Conference of New England Champions	2026

=== Women's soccer ===
==== Division I ====
College Cup appearances	1992
NCAA Tournament appearances	1989, 1990, 1991, 1992, 1994, 1995, 1997, 1998, 1999, 2000, 2001, 2002, 2006
America East Tournament Champions	1994, 1995, 1997, 1998, 1999, 2002, 2006
America East Regular Season Champions	1991, 1992, 1993, 1994, 1997, 1998, 1999, 2002, 2006, 2014, 2015, 2016, 2018

==== Division III ====
ECAC Champions	2023, 2024
NCAA Tournament appearances	2025, 2026
Conference of New England Tournament Champions	2024, 2025, 2026
Conference of New England Regular Season Champions	2024, 2025, 2026

=== Women's outdoor track & field ===
NCAA Division III Individual Event Champion	2026 Kayla Pelletier Javelin Throw 45.73
Conference of New England Champions	2026

=== Volleyball ===
America East Tournament Champions	1993
America East Regular Season Champions	1993

== Athletic facilities ==
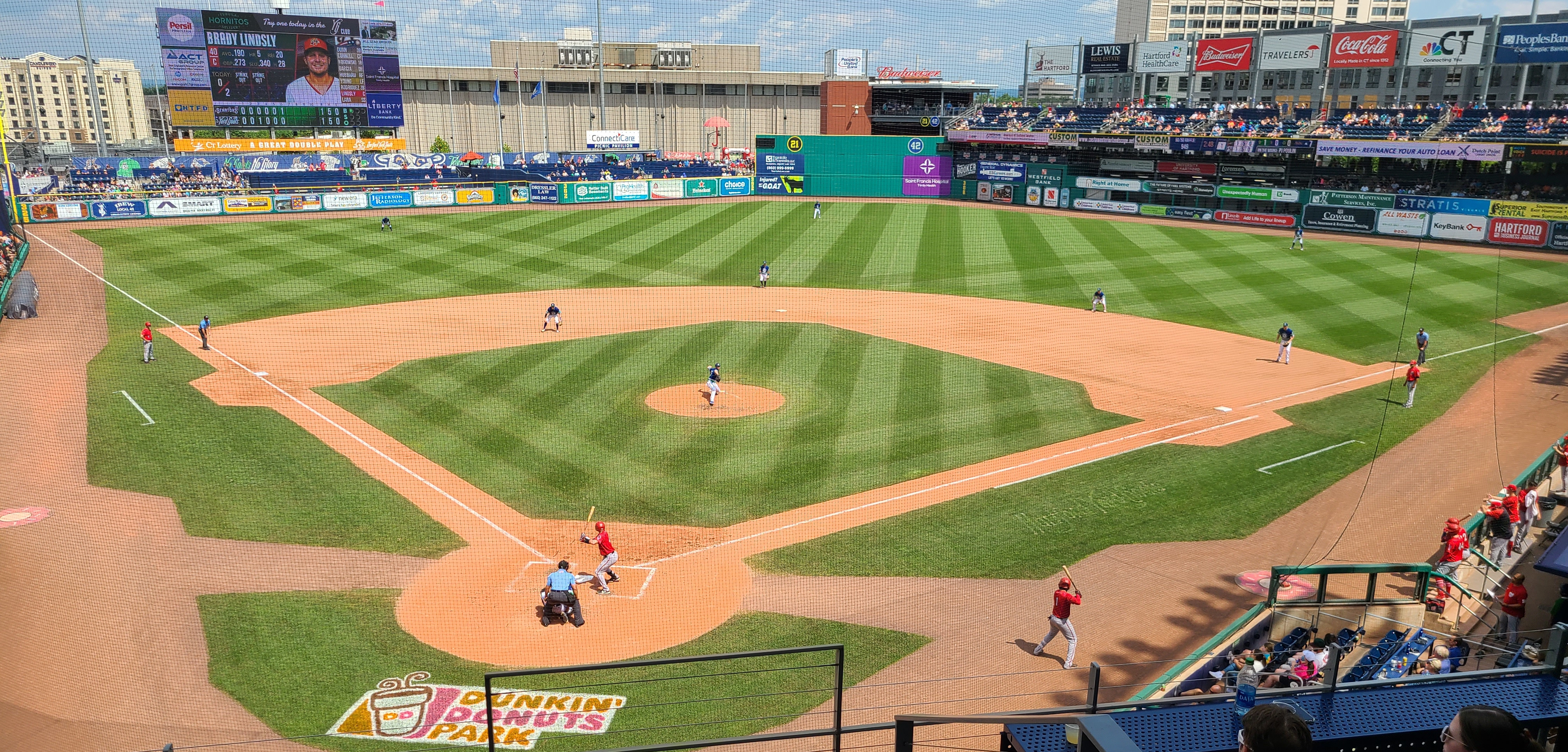
Dunkin' Park

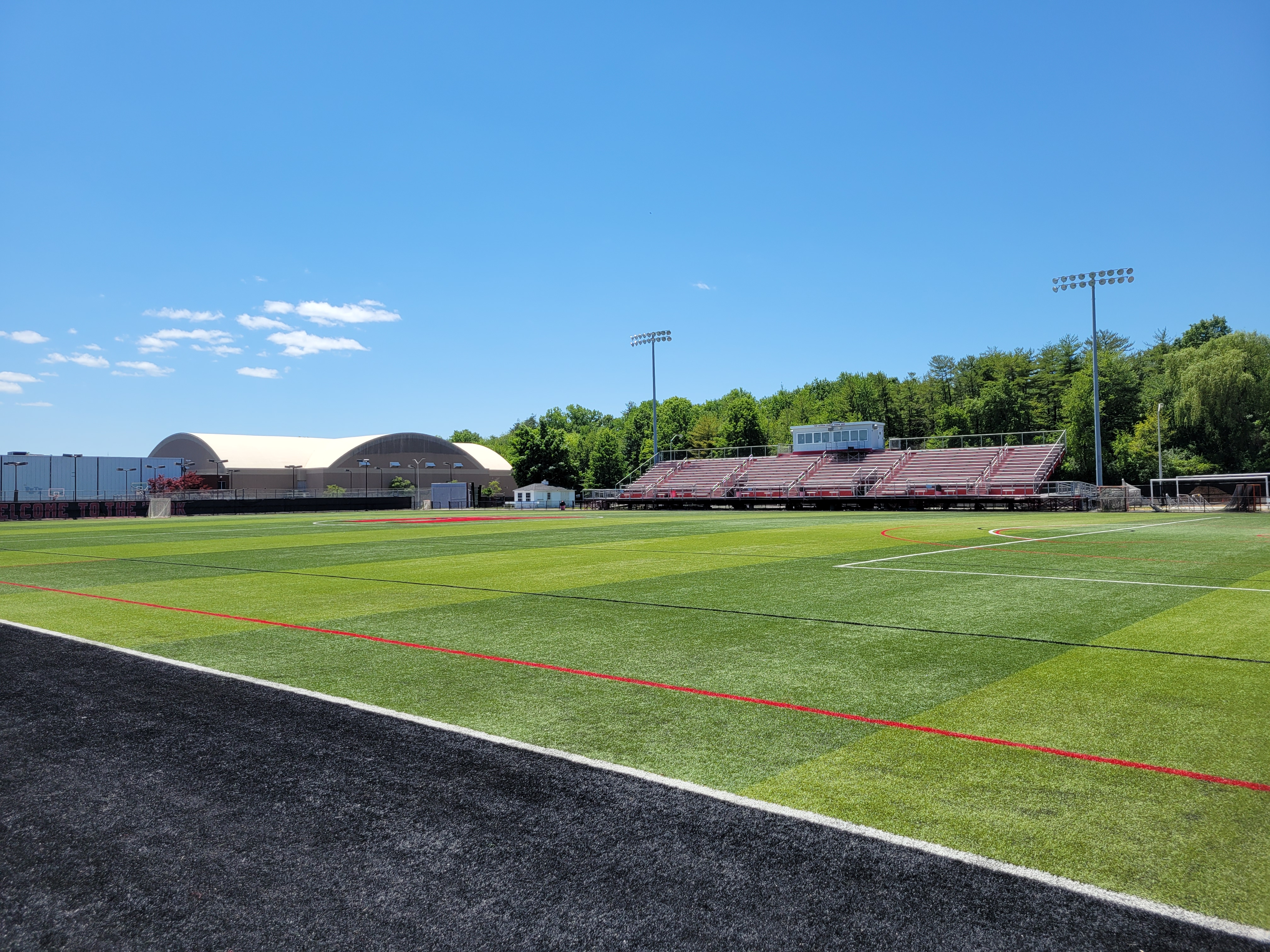
Al Marzook Field

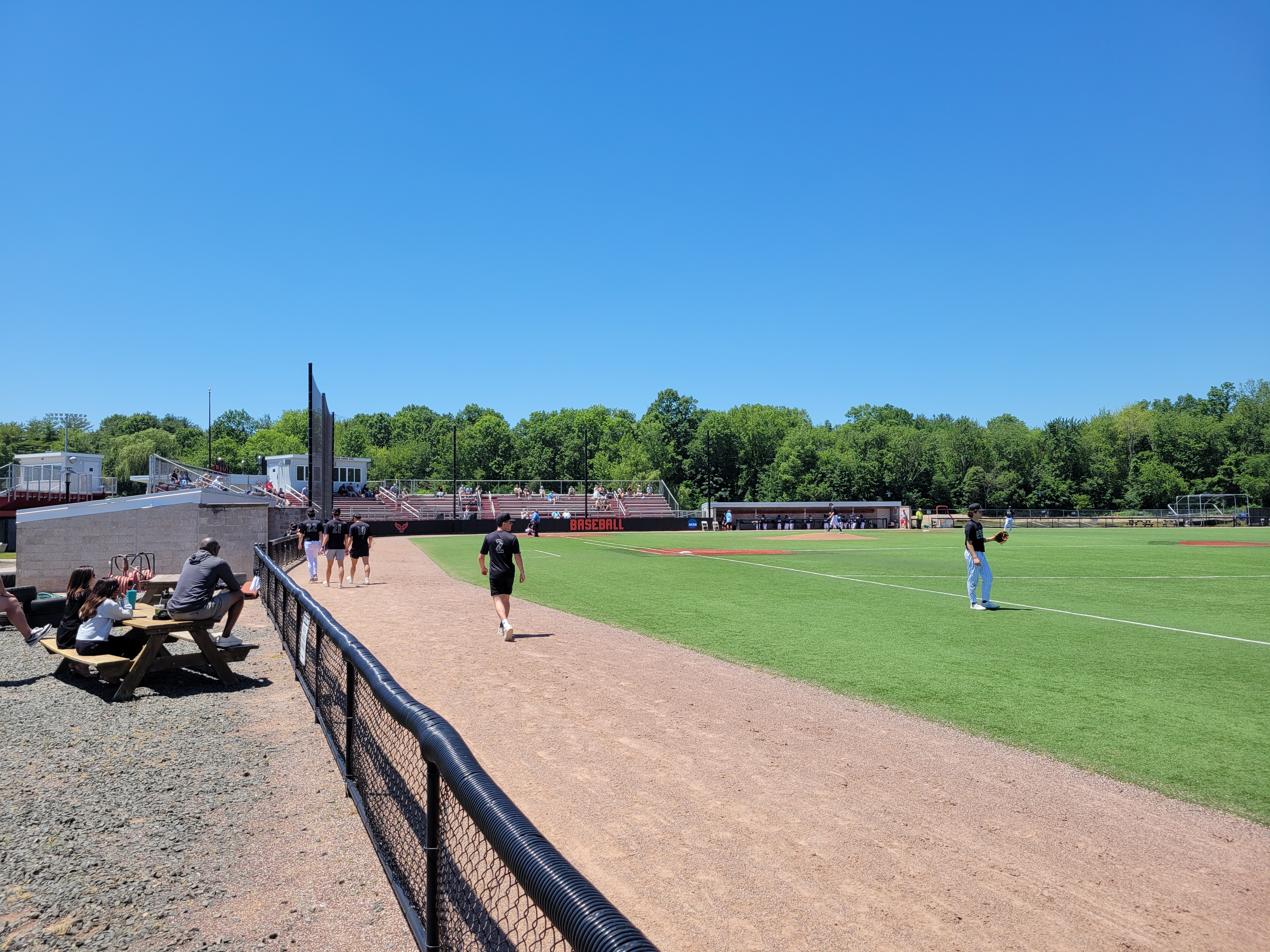
Fiondella Field

Gillette Ridge course

Venue	Sport	Capacity
Fiondella Field	Baseball	1,000
Chase Arena	Basketball	4,017
Al-Marzook Field	Field hockey	2,500
Al-Marzook Field	Lacrosse	2,500
Al-Marzook Field	Soccer	2,500
Hartford Softball Field	Softball	1,000
Grant Family Track and Field	Track & field (outdoor)	n/a
Hartford Volleyball Arena	Volleyball	500
Dunkin' Park (Note: Not owned by the University.)	Baseball	6,121
Gillette Ridge Golf Club	Golf (men's)	n/a
Wampanoag Country Club	Golf (women's)	n/a
Elizabeth Park, Hartford	Cross Country	–

== Academics ==
From Hartford's athletic website: "Hartford, which has posted a combined GPA of 3.0 or higher in each of the last 15 semesters, saw an average of 70 percent of its student-athletes record a 3.0 in one or both semesters last year. In addition, 43 percent of Hawk student-athletes notched at least a 3.5 while five percent registered perfect 4.0 GPA's for the 2012–13 academic year." "The University of Hartford clinched its second-straight America East Academic Cup in 2012–13 after posting the highest grade-point average of any school in the 18-year history of the award. Compiling a 3.24 GPA in 2012–13, the Hawks won their third Academic Cup all-time."

== Mascot and nickname ==
From Hartford's athletic website: "Howie is well known among the University of Hartford community and fans, and has been known for his on court antics during basketball games. The current version of Howie the Hawk began its tenure during the winter of 2008–09." "The nickname originated in the late 1940s when the school competed as Hillyer College. It is believed that the nickname stemmed from spectators having to climb four flights of stairs in the old Chauncey Harris School on Hudson Street in Hartford to the "Hawk's Nest" to watch basketball and wrestling events."

== Notable Hawks ==
- Jeff Bagwell – Former Hartford third baseman (1987–89). 2x All-American (1988, 1989), 2x Eastern College Athletic Conference (ECAC) Player of the Year (1988, 1989). Hartford's all-time leader in batting average and slugging percentage. Selected as the 110th overall pick in the 4th round of the 1989 MLB draft by the Boston Red Sox (1989–90). Traded to the Houston Astros (1990–2005) on August 30, 1990. NL MVP (1994), 4x MLB All-Star (1994, 1996, 1997, 1999), NL Rookie of the Year (1991), Gold Glove Award (1994), 3x Silver Slugger (1994, 1997, 1999). Former Houston Astros hitting coach (2010), Major League Baseball Hall of Fame, Cooperstown, NY, inducted (2017).
- Vin Baker — Former Hartford center (1989–93). North Atlantic Conference (NAC) Player of the Year (1992–93). Hartford's all-time leading scorer. Selected as the 8th overall pick in the 1st round of the 1993 NBA draft by the Milwaukee Bucks (1993–97). Seattle SuperSonics (1997–02), Boston Celtics (2002–04), New York Knicks (2004–05), Houston Rockets (2005), Los Angeles Clippers (2006), Minnesota Timberwolves (2006). 4x NBA All-Star (1994–95, 1995–96, 1996–97, 1997–98). All-NBA Second Team (1997–98). All-NBA Third Team (1996–97). NBA All-Rookie First Team (1993–94).
- Jerry Kelly
- Tracey Kelusky
- Tim Petrovic
- Patrick Sheehan
- Saralyn Smith
- Earl Snyder — Former Hartford first/third baseman (1995–98). Hartford's all-time leader in hits, runs, home runs, runs batted in (RBIs), and total bases.
- Sean Newcomb — Former Hartford starting pitcher (2012–14). Baseball America All-American Third Team (2014), ABCA All-American Second Team (2014), Perfect Game All-American Second Team (2014). ABCA All-Northeast Region First Team (2014). America East Pitcher of the Year (2014). Selected 15th overall in the 1st round of the 2014 Major League Baseball draft by the Los Angeles Angels of Anaheim (2014–2015) before being traded to the Atlanta Braves whom he would make his MLB debut with in 2017. As of 2023, he is currently a member of the San Francisco Giants.

== Athletic directors ==
- Peter A. LoMaglio
- Gordon McCullough (1974–1986)
- Pat Meiser (1993–2014)
- Anton Goff (2014–2016)
- Mary Ellen Gillespie (2017–2019)
- Maria Feeley (interim) (2019–2021)
- Dr. Sharon Beverly (2021–2023)
- Alicia Queally (2023–present)
