= Binghamton Bearcats =

Athletic teams representing Binghamton University

- University: Binghamton University
- Nickname: Bearcats
- NCAA: Division I
- Conference: America East (primary); NEC (men's tennis, women's tennis, men's golf); EIWA (wrestling)
- Athletic director: Eugene Marshall Jr.
- Location: Vestal, New York
- Varsity teams: 21
- Basketball arena: Binghamton University Events Center
- Colors: Dark green, white, and black
- Mascot: Baxter the Bearcat
- Website: bubearcats.com
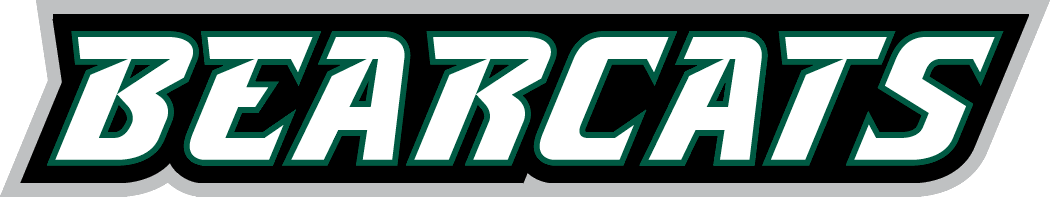

The Binghamton Bearcats are the NCAA Division I athletics teams at Binghamton University located in Vestal, New York, United States. They are one of four Division I programs in the SUNY system. A member of the America East Conference, Binghamton University sponsors teams in eleven men's and ten women's NCAA-sanctioned sports. The men's golf, men's tennis, and women's tennis teams are affiliate members of the Northeast Conference, and the wrestling team is a member of the Eastern Intercollegiate Wrestling Association.

== History ==
America East Conference logo in Binghamton's colors

Binghamton has competed in the National Collegiate Athletic Association (NCAA) since joining the State University of New York (SUNY) system in 1950. During the 1946–1950 era, there were no particular affiliations or mascots. When, in fact, they joined SUNY and adopted the new name Harpur College, the school also adopted their first mascot: a donkey named Harpo. In transitioning to SUNY Binghamton, they also developed their athletics program further, adopting the new school nickname and mascot: The red, white, and blue Colonials.

On May 6, 1999, it was announced that Binghamton would begin the required compliance process for a move to NCAA Division I participation. On August 27, 1999, the school adopted a new nickname, the Bearcats, along with the new logo. The new nickname was described as "a mythical animal that combines the power and ferocity of a bear with the cunning and quickness of a cat." The Bearcat mascot was given the name Baxter in 2001.

On April 18, 2001, the school was officially admitted as a member of the America East Conference in all sports other than wrestling and golf, which were not sponsored by the America East.

The wrestling program became a provisional member of the now-defunct East Coast Wrestling Association (ECWA) beginning with the 1999–2000 season. They spent the 1996–97 and 1997-98 seasons competing in the NCAA Division II. It was announced on September 4, 2001 that the ECWA would merge with the Colonial Athletic Association (CAA) for the 2001-02 season. On April 25, 2013, it was announced that Binghamton (along with fellow CAA members: Hofstra, Drexel, and Boston University) would leave the CAA to join the Eastern Intercollegiate Wrestling Association (EIWA).

Former Director of Health, Physical Education, and Athletics, Dr. Joel Thirer oversaw the transition from NCAA Division III to NCAA Division II to NCAA Division I. Hired in 1989, Dr. Thirer resigned on September 30, 2009, amid controversy surrounding the Men's Basketball program.

More recently, the university has hosted a number of conference championships, including the 2005, 2006 and 2008 men's basketball championships, as well as, other championships from other sports.

In a Sept. 29, 2009 statement, Jim Norris had been named Interim Athletic Director. The Director of Athletics reports directly to the then-interim President McGrath.

Patrick Elliott was introduced as Binghamton's director of athletics on October 6, 2011, and began his appointment on November 14.

Following a national search led by Parker Executive Search, Binghamton University's President Harvey Stenger announced on November 22, 2022, the hiring of Hampton University's athletics director, Eugene Marshall Jr. as the Bearcats’ new director of athletics. Marshall began his appointment on January 5, 2023.

Binghamton currently sponsors 21 intercollegiate sports.

== Teams sponsored ==
Men's sports	Women's sports
Baseball	Basketball
Basketball	Cross country
Cross country	Lacrosse
Golf	Soccer
Lacrosse	Softball
Soccer	Swimming & diving
Swimming & diving	Tennis
Tennis	Track and field^{†}
Track and field^{†}	Volleyball
Wrestling	
† – Track and field includes both indoor and outdoor.

=== Basketball ===
- Following a loss to Boston University (BU) in the first round of the 2007 America East Championship, head coach Al Walker (the only coach Binghamton had had in its Div. I history) resigned as head coach. As of March 26, Kevin Broadus, assistant coach for Georgetown University was announced to fill Walker's position.
- In his second season as head coach, Kevin Broadus took the Bearcats to their first regular season conference title in school history.
- Binghamton defeated UMBC 61–51 in the America East Tournament Championship Game and made their first appearance in the NCAA tournament, earning the 15 seed and losing to second-seeded Duke in the first round.
- In October 2009, Broadus was suspended with pay and replaced by Mark Macon on an interim basis.
- The school became entangled in a scandal when it was discovered that the university had compromised admissions and academic standards in order to bolster its men's basketball team. Several players and staffers were dismissed from the program following numerous arrests and allegations of academic dishonesty.
- Binghamton's men's basketball team has never recovered from the scandal, failing to accrue a winning record in overall or conference play since.

The women's team has made no Division I Tournament appearances, but they made the Division III Tournament from 1995 to 1998 and Division II in 1999.

=== Baseball ===
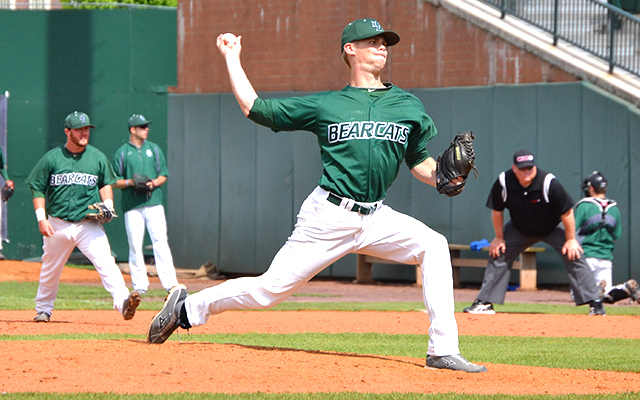
Binghamton en route to winning the 2014 America East Conference baseball tournament

=== Rugby ===
Binghamton University Rugby

The men's rugby team was founded by an exchange student from London. He began promoting the idea of founding a college club in the spring of 1979 and began organizing and establishing the Club in earnest in the fall of 1979. The Binghamton Devils Rugby Club currently competes at the highest level of collegiate rugby, D1A. The program has won numerous conference championships and is widely acknowledged as the best looking program on campus.

=== Other programs ===
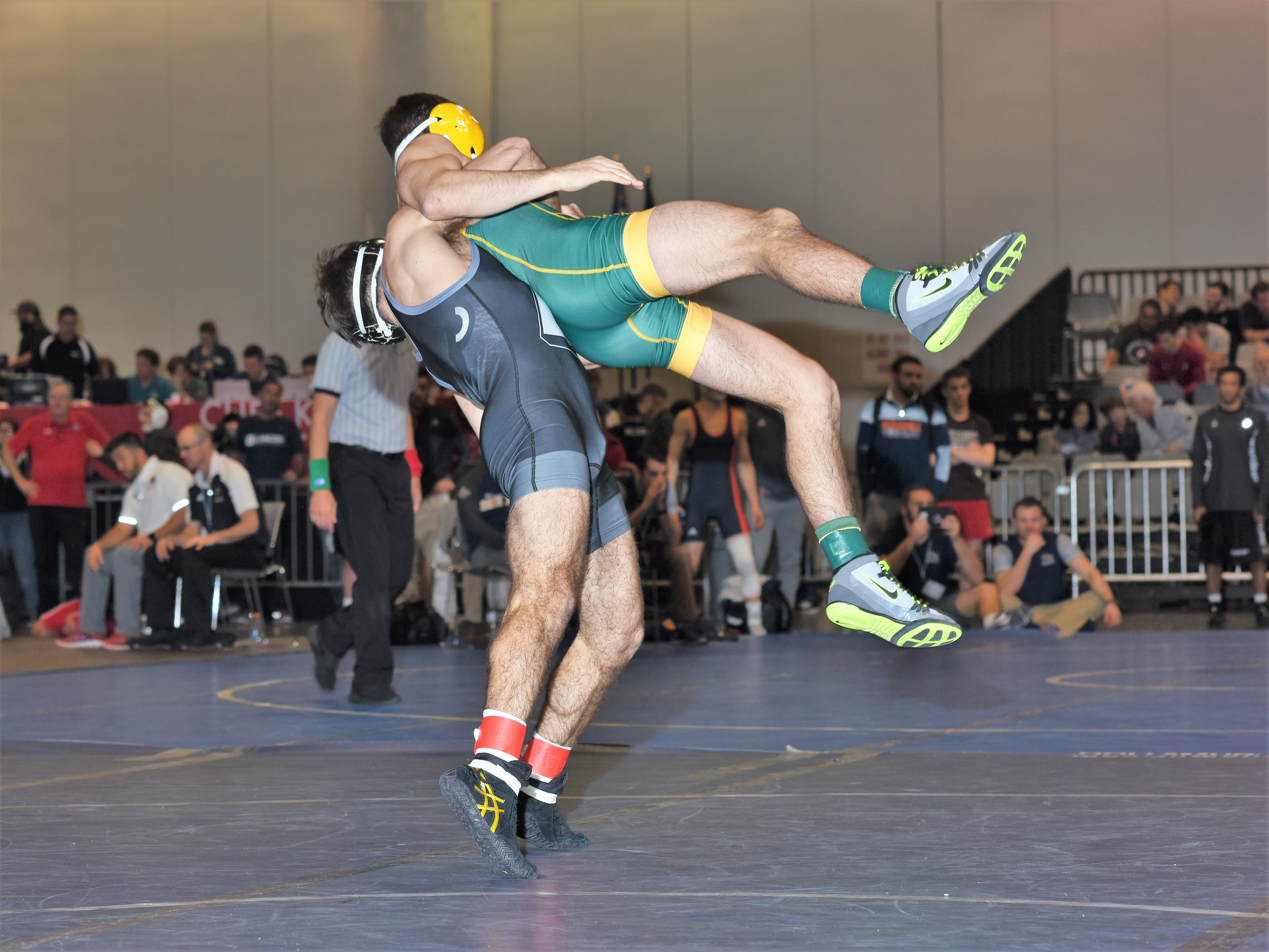
A Binghamton wrestler (left) tosses a North Dakota State wrestler during a match in 2017

Binghamton has 20 other successful Division I program sports, although the media focuses primarily on men's basketball. They include women's basketball, golf, baseball, softball, men's lacrosse, women's lacrosse, men's soccer, women's soccer, men's cross country, women's cross country, men's swimming & diving, women's swimming & diving, men's tennis, women's tennis, women's volleyball, wrestling, men's indoor track, women's indoor track, men's outdoor track and women's outdoor track. The program posted an overall 3.1 APR for all 21 sports and has been recognized for its scholar athletes. The men's tennis program posted an overall 3.69 GPA for the 2010 spring semester.

== Facilities ==
=== Events Center ===
The Events Center plays host to both men and women basketball games. It has a capacity of nearly ten thousand for non-sporting events and approximately 5,222 for basketball games. With recent capacity issues, the Athletic Department will be looking at various existent options for expanding capacity in the 2009–2010 season. The facilities has an indoor track where the track and field teams practice and compete, indoor tennis courts for both men and women tennis teams, as well as the primary weight and fitness equipment, sports medicine and uniform issuance facilities. The facility also includes a 150-person private lounge donated by a Binghamton University fraternity, Tau Alpha Upsilon (TAU). It is known as the TAU Bearcat Clubroom.

=== Bearcats Sports Complex ===
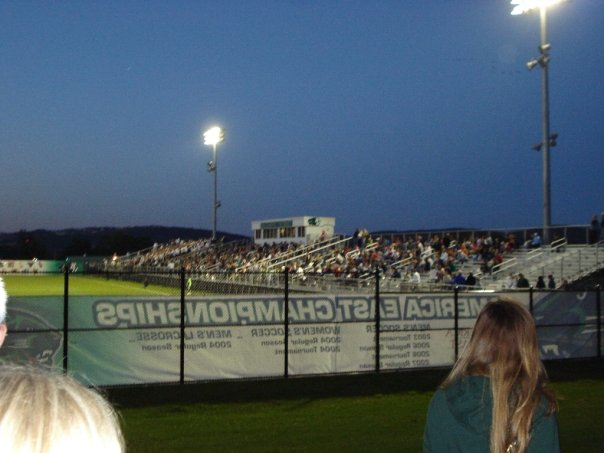
The main stands of the Bearcats Sports Complex during a soccer game

Opened in the Fall of 2007, the Bearcat Sports Complex features two artificial turf fields for soccer and lacrosse. One field is intended primarily for competition and the other for practice. Additional features include night lighting, over 2,500 seats for the competition field and 1,000 for the practice field, a concession stand, and bathrooms. In 2009, the Tau Alpha Upsilon (TAU) fraternity sponsored the naming of both the press box and the scoreboard. A plaque was dedicated in their honor at the entrance of the new sports complex. A recent announcement unveiled plans to move the softball competition field to the complex. A new field along with a modestly sized stadium and a press box will be added immediately behind the current concession stand.

=== West Gym ===
The West Gym is an athletic facility that hosts the weight, practice and competition facilities for the wrestling team. Also, the varsity pool is home to both men and women swim and diving teams. The gymnasium is used for volleyball, basketball practice, baseball practice (has batting cages on the inside) and wrestling matches.

=== Varsity Field ===
Home to the varsity baseball team, Varsity Field features a diamond with dugouts and bleachers. It was recently announced that Varsity field will undergo major renovations set for completion by the 2012 season. The project was supposed to be for an artificial turf field along with light and many other updates including bathrooms in the dugouts. However, the state would not allow them to get turf so the team did receive a new field but did not receive all of the promises they were originally told.

=== East Gym Field ===
Home to the softball team.

=== Alumni Stadium ===
A 2,000-seat stadium, athletic field, outdoor track and field facilities. While it has previously hosted the lacrosse teams, it is primarily used for the track and field teams. The track was resurfaced in 2007. The field has also hosted rugby games in the fall season. Although it has not been used recently due to fears of the rugby team destroying the field while playing. This is despite the fact that they are the only team to use the infield of the track in the fall or spring.
