= UMass Lowell River Hawks =

Intercollegiate athletics teams at the University of Massachusetts Lowell

- University: University of Massachusetts Lowell
- Nickname: River Hawks
- NCAA: Division I
- Conference: America East (primary); Hockey East
- Athletic director: Lynn Coutts
- Location: Lowell, Massachusetts
- Varsity teams: 16
- Basketball arena: Tsongas Center/Kennedy Family Athletic Complex
- Baseball stadium: Edward A. LeLacheur Park
- Soccer stadium: Cushing Field Complex
- Colors: Blue, white, and red
- Mascot: Rowdy the River Hawk
- Fight song: "River Hawk Pride"
- Website: goriverhawks.com
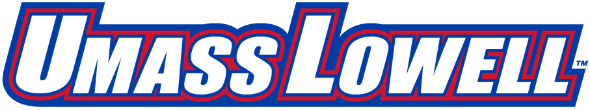

The UMass Lowell River Hawks are the NCAA Division I intercollegiate athletics teams representing the University of Massachusetts Lowell in Lowell, Massachusetts, United States. Members of the America East Conference for all sports (except the men's ice hockey team, which competes in Hockey East). UMass Lowell sponsors teams in seven men's and seven women's NCAA sanctioned sports. Prior to transitioning to Division I in 2013, the River Hawks competed in the Northeast-10 Conference in Division II.

== History of the nickname ==
In 1948, Lowell Textile Institute began using "Terry Tex" as the mascot for the college. The bull terrier was chosen as it represented all things textile and the school's athletic programs adopted the 'Terriers' moniker. In 1971, the college, which had become Lowell Technological Institute some years earlier decided that a new nickname was needed. The athletic department changed the moniker from 'Terriers' to 'Chiefs' to represent strength, honor and leadership. They chose the name in part because they believed that it avoided the derogatory connotations that were associated with other nicknames like 'Indians' or 'Redskins'.

When Lowell Tech merged with Lowell State College to form the 'University of Lowell' in 1975, the new athletic teams continued with the 'Chiefs' nickname. Once Lowell joined the University of Massachusetts system in 1991, the school began to receive pressure to move away from the Chiefs name which, invariably, had become associated with derogatory native imagery. In 1993, the school formed a committee of students, faculty and staff to decide the fate of both the name and logo. By a vote of 14–1, the committee recommended retiring the 'Chiefs' name and Chancellor William Hogan accepted the decision in January 1994.

Over 150 submissions were made for the new name. The most popular came from Chad Dooley in a letter to Bruce Crowder, the coach of the ice hockey team. Dooley suggested the hawk as a moniker for the programs. In an effort to tie the Merrimack River to the school the committee altered the name slightly to 'River Hawks'. The three finalists for the new name were 'River Hawks', 'Raging Rapids' and 'Lightning' with River Hawks being selected by popular vote. The first logo for the new nickname was produced in May 1994 and, while both the name and mascot have gone stylistic changes in the years since, the school has continued with the River Hawks name.

== Sponsored sports ==
America East Conference logo in UMass Lowell's colors

Men's sports	Women's sports
Baseball	Basketball
Basketball	Cross country
Cross country	Field hockey
Ice hockey	Lacrosse
Lacrosse	Soccer
Soccer	Softball
Track and field^{†}	Track and field^{†}
† – Track and field includes both indoor and outdoor.

The University of Massachusetts Lowell participates in 16 sports at the Division I level. On July 1, 2013, 14 of UMass Lowell's Division II teams moved up to Division I, joining the America East Conference. The River Hawks formerly competed in the Northeast-10 Conference at the Division II level. Past champions include the 1988 men's basketball team, the 1991 men's cross country team, the ice hockey team (three times) and the field hockey team twice (2005, 2010). The 2010 field hockey team finished its season with a perfect 24–0 record. The university added men's and women's lacrosse for the 2014–2015 academic year.

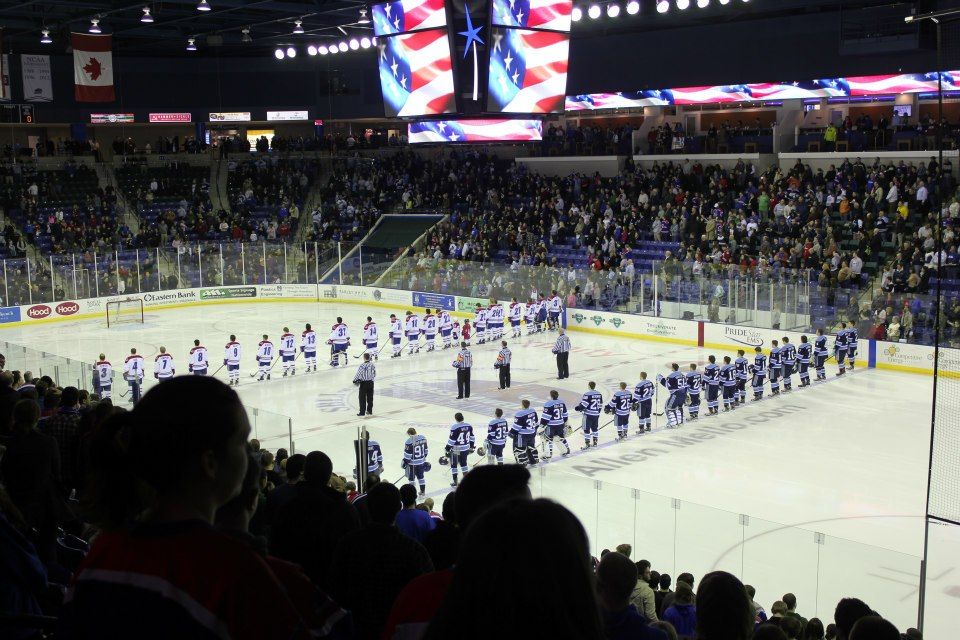
Men's Hockey at the Tsongas Center at UMass Lowell

The university's men's hockey team plays in the Hockey East Association and plays its home games at the Tsongas Center at UMass Lowell. In 2013, the men's hockey team won the Hockey East regular-season and tournament championships and advanced to the NCAA Division I Championship "Frozen Four," all for the first time in the university's history. The men's hockey team repeated as Hockey East champions in 2014 while advancing to the NCAA Division I Men's Ice Hockey Championship for the third straight year and sixth time overall. Goalie Connor Hellebuyck is the only Hockey East player to receive the league tournament's Most Valuable Player Award in two consecutive years, earning the honor in 2013 and 2014.

The nickname "River Hawks" came about during the school's transition from the University of Lowell to UMass Lowell and was inspired by the campus's location along the Merrimack River. The University of Lowell's nickname was the Chiefs, which was abandoned in favor of the current name. A campus-wide poll was conducted for student input and final candidates included the Ospreys and the Raging Rapids, according to the Connector student newspaper.

=== Discontinued sports ===
==== Football ====
UMass Lowell started playing NCAA Division III football in 1980. Under coach Dennis Scannell, UMass Lowell enjoyed a 35–4 run from 1988 to 1991, making the 1991 NCAA Division III Football Championship playoffs, losing to Union in the first round. UMass Lowell made the move to NCAA Division II as a member of the Northeast-10 Conference in 2000. Due to budget cuts and lack of competitiveness on the field, the administration cut the sport in 2003.

== Facilities ==
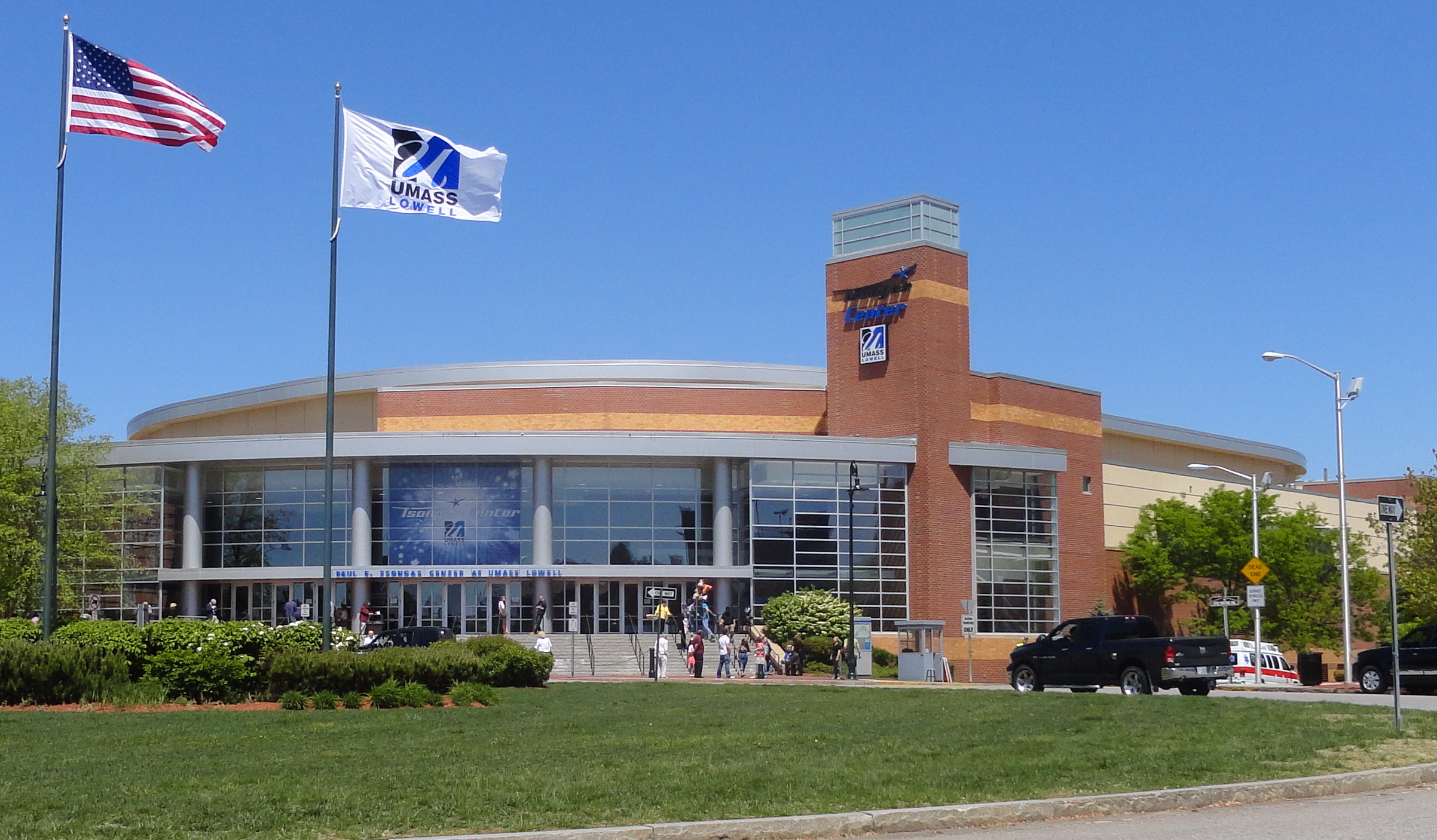
Tsongas Center

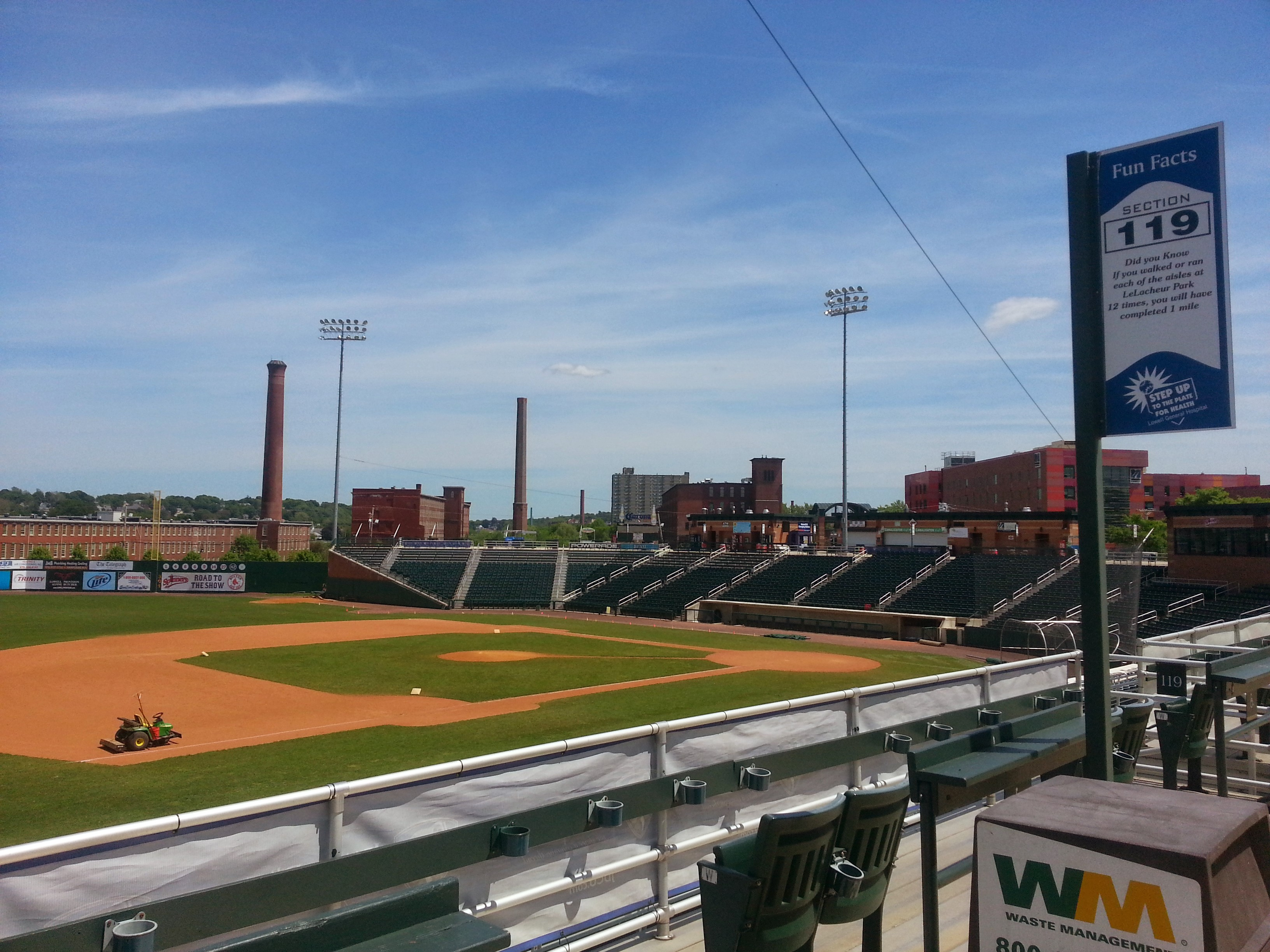
LeLacheur Park

Venue	Sport	Capacity
Edward A. LeLacheur Park	Baseball	4,797
Costello Athletic Center	Basketball	2,000
Tsongas Center	Basketball	6,496
Cushing Field Complex	Field hockey	n/a
Cushing Field Complex	Lacrosse	n/a
Cushing Field Complex	Soccer	n/a
Cushing Field Complex	Track & field	n/a
Tsongas Center	Ice hockey	6,496
River View Field	Softball	n/a

== Notable athletes ==
- Craig Charron, former professional ice hockey player
- Jeff Daw, Former NHL player with the Colorado Avalanche
- Shelagh Donohoe, Olympic Silver Medalist in Women's Rowing
- Christian Folin, NHL player with the Los Angeles Kings
- Scott Fankhouser, Former NHL player with the Atlanta Thrashers
- Gustavs Davis Grigals for the best player in the 2021 Friendship Four tournament
- Ron Hainsey, NHL player with the Toronto Maple Leafs, Montreal Canadiens, Columbus Blue Jackets, Atlanta Thrashers, Winnipeg Jets, Carolina Hurricanes, and Pittsburgh Penguins; Stanley Cup champion.
- Connor Hellebuyck, NHL player with the Winnipeg Jets
- Carter Hutton, NHL player with the Buffalo Sabres
- Ben Holmstrom, NHL hockey player with the Philadelphia Flyers
- Dean Jenkins, Former NHL hockey player with the Los Angeles Kings
- Greg Koehler, Former NHL hockey player with the Carolina Hurricanes
- Mark Kumpel, Member of the 1984 U.S. Olympic Hockey team and former NHL player with the Quebec Nordiques and the Winnipeg Jets
- Mike LaValliere, Former Major League Baseball catcher for the Philadelphia Phillies, St. Louis Cardinals, Pittsburgh Pirates, and Chicago White Sox. Recipient of the 1987 NL Gold Glove Award at catcher.
- Craig MacTavish, Former NHL player with Boston Bruins, Edmonton Oilers, St. Louis Blues, Philadelphia Flyers and New York Rangers and former coach of the Edmonton Oilers, where he serves as senior vice president; Stanley Cup champion.
- Bill Morrell, Former Major League Baseball pitcher for the Washington Senators and NY Giants.
- Jon Morris, Former NHL player with the New Jersey Devils, San Jose Sharks and Boston Bruins
- Dwayne Roloson, NHL player with the Tampa Bay Lightning, New York Islanders, Calgary Flames, Buffalo Sabres, Minnesota Wild and Edmonton Oilers, two-time all-star
- Chad Ruhwedel, NHL player with the Pittsburgh Penguins
- Ben Walter, Former NHL player with the Boston Bruins, New York Islanders and New Jersey Devils
- Scott Waugh, Physical therapist with the Boston Bruins, Boston Red Sox and director at the Massachusetts General Hospital Sports Physical Therapy Service
- Scott Wilson, NHL player with the Buffalo Sabres; Stanley Cup champion.
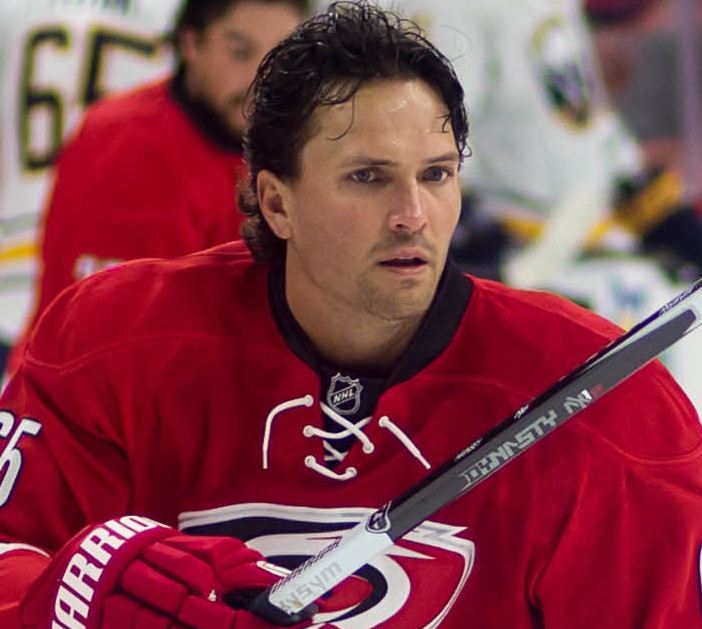
Ron Hainsey

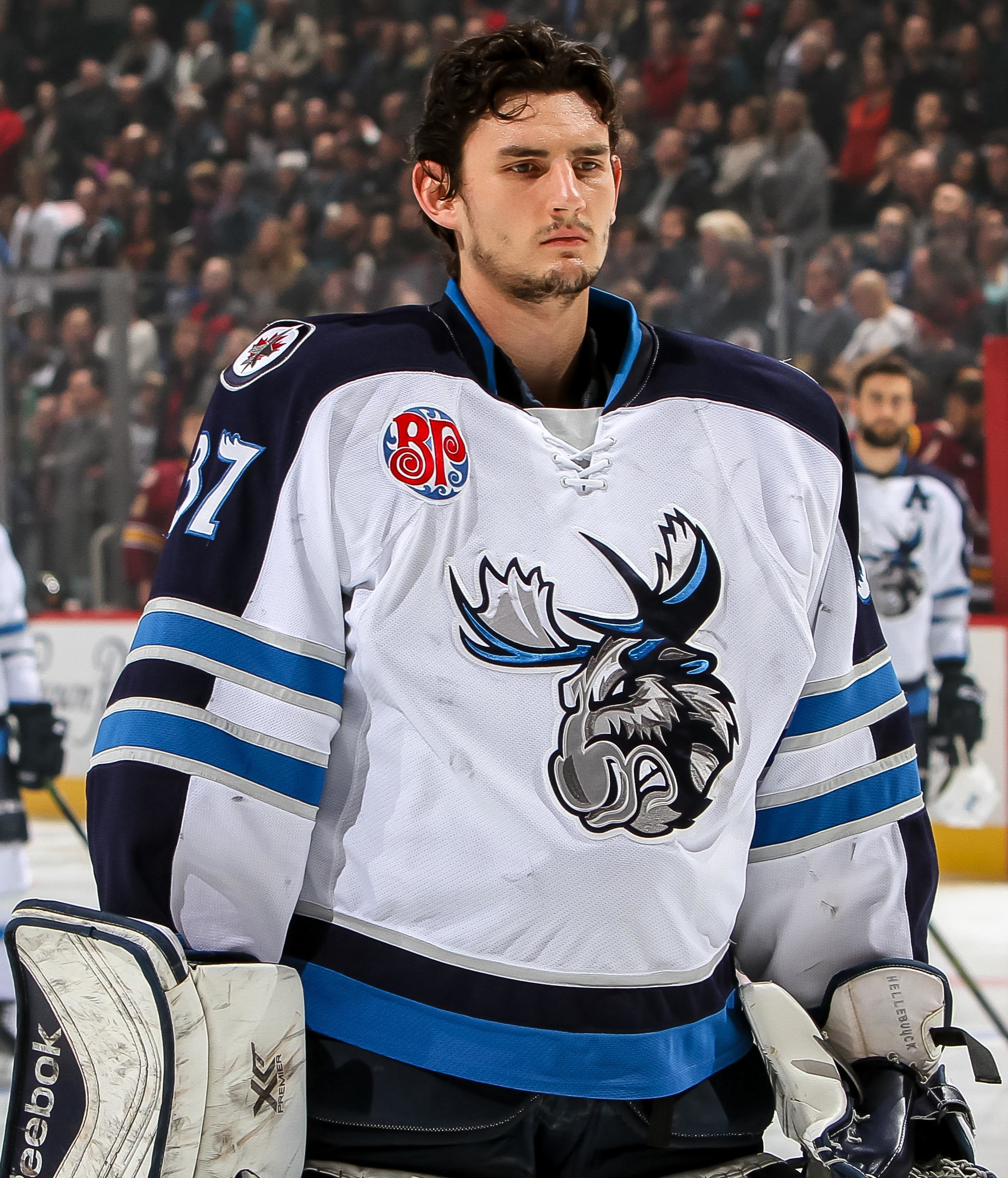
Connor Hellebuyck

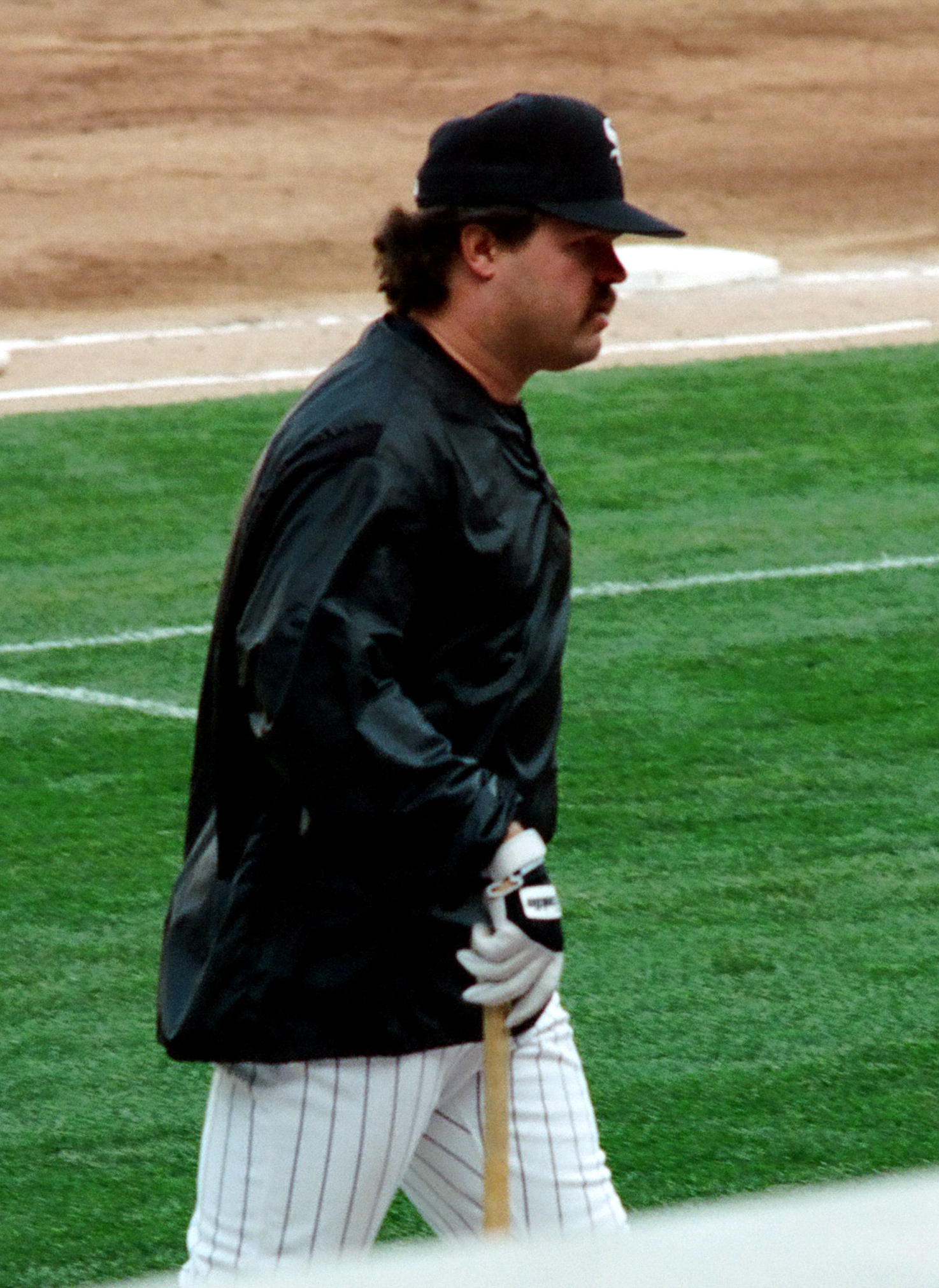
Mike LaValliere

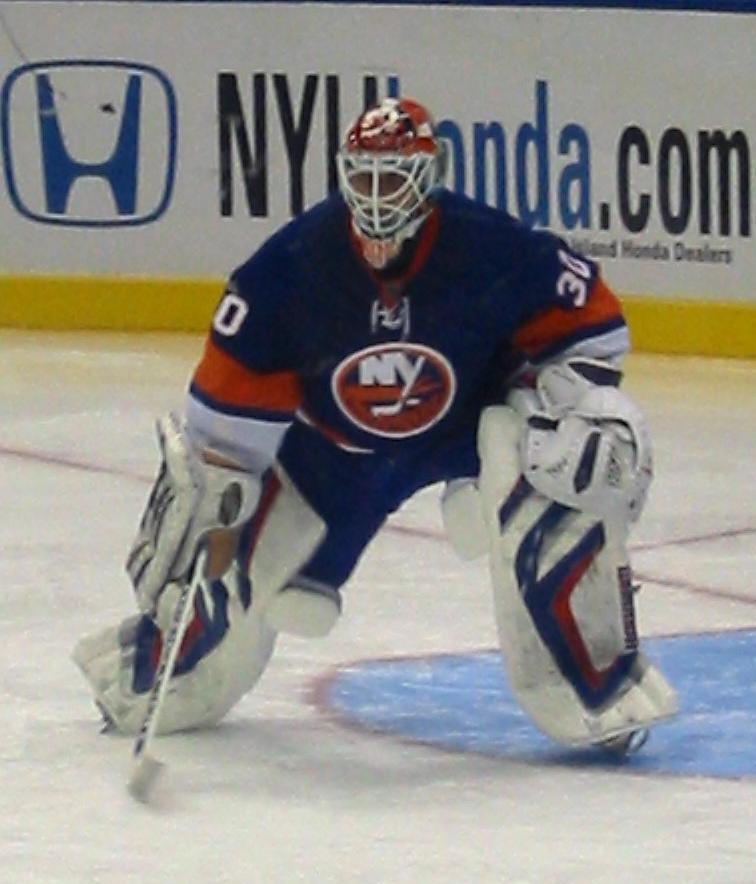
Dwayne Roloson

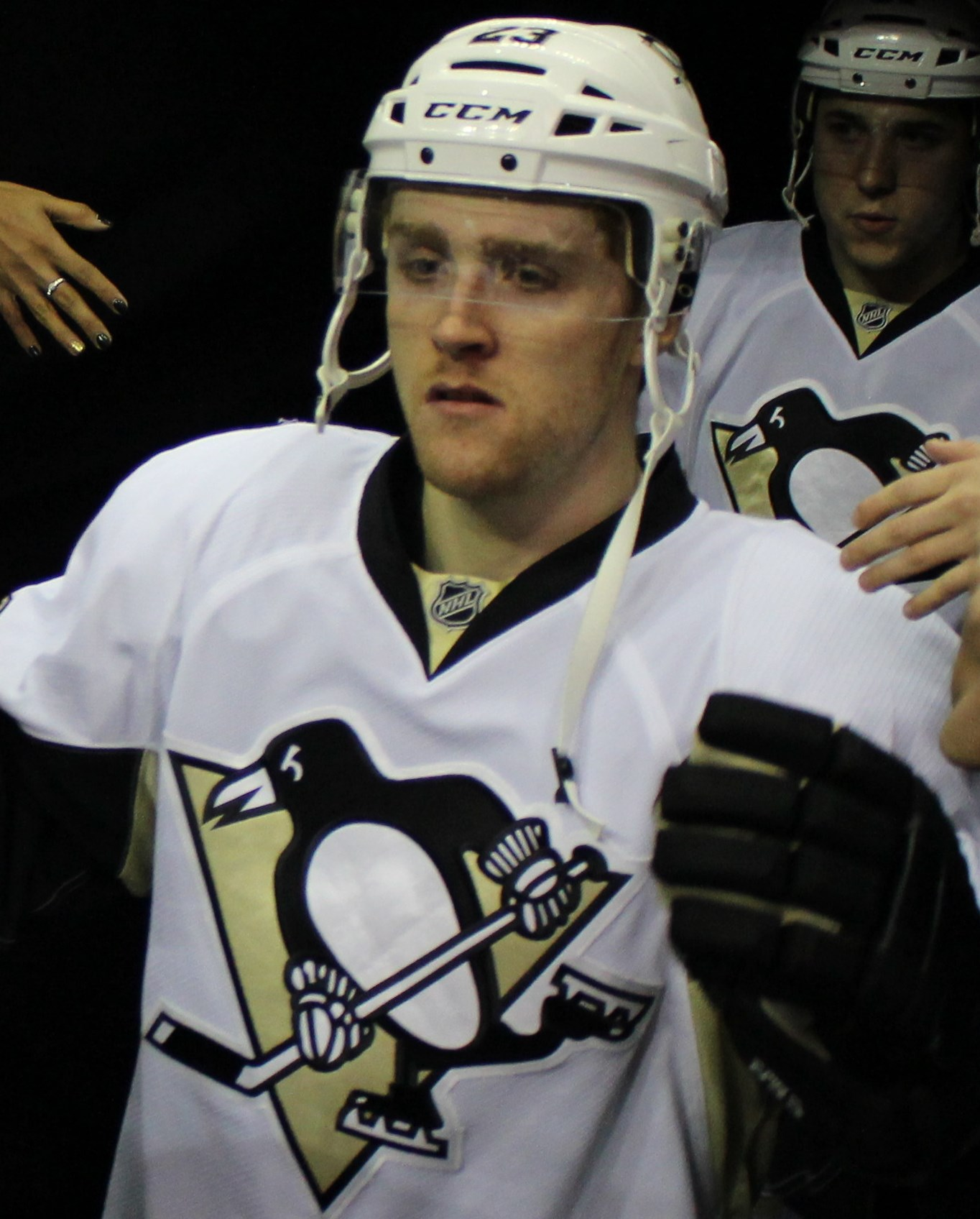
Scott Wilson

== Notable staff ==
- Harry Lew (1884–1963) 1902 First African American professional basketball player, New England League, Pawtucketville Athletic Club, Lowell. Also 1922 Lowell Textile Institute (now UMass Lowell) Basketball Coach.

== Athletic directors ==
- Dana Skinner (1987–2018)
- Peter Casey (2018–present)

== National championships ==
The University of Massachusetts Lowell has won seven team NCAA Championships.

=== Team ===
Sport	Association	Division	Year	Opponent/Runner-up	Score
Men's Basketball (1)	NCAA	Division II	1988	Alaska Anchorage	75–72
Men's Cross Country (1)	NCAA	Division II	1991	Nebraska–Kearney	48–96 (-48)
Field Hockey (2)	NCAA	Division II	2005	Bloomsburg	2–1 (2OT)
Field Hockey (2)	NCAA	Division II	2010	Shippensburg	1–0
Men's Ice Hockey (3)	NCAA	Division II	1979	Mankato State	6–4
Men's Ice Hockey (3)	NCAA	Division II	1981	Plattsburgh State	5–4
Men's Ice Hockey (3)	NCAA	Division II	1982	Plattsburgh State	5–1
