= 2009–10 Arsenal L.F.C. season =

English women's football club season

Arsenal Ladies
2009–10 season
- Chairman: Peter Hill-Wood
- Manager: Tony Gervaise (Until February 2010); Laura Harvey (From February 2010)
- Stadium: Meadow Park
- Premier League: Champions
- FA Cup: Runners Up
- Premier League Cup: Semi-finals
- Champions League: Quarter-finals
- London County Cup: Winners
- Top goalscorer: League: Kim Little (23); All: Kim Little (47)
- Biggest win: 10–0 (vs Tottenham Hotspur (A), London County Cup, 4 March 2010)
- Biggest defeat: 0–2 (vs Duisburg (H), UWCL, 14 March 2010)
Home colours	Away colours	Third colours

The 2009–10 season was Arsenal Ladies Football Club's 23rd season since forming in 1987. The club participated in the National Division of the FA Women's Premier League, the final season they would compete in this League before joining the WSL in 2011. Arsenal won their 7th consecutive League Title, comfortably finishing 11 points ahead of 2nd place Everton. However, Everton would be their downfall in the Premier League Cup and FA Women's Cup, defeating them in the Semi-finals and Final respectively. They also competed in the UEFA Women's Champions League, but lost at the Quarter-final stage to Duisburg.

This was Arsenal's first season without manager Vic Akers, who stood down at the end of the previous season to take up the position of General Manager at the club. Tony Gervaise was appointed to take charge, however, he stood down after just 20 games into the season, citing there was a lack of clarity about who was in charge, and was replaced by Laura Harvey.

== Squad information & statistics ==
=== First team squad ===
Squad statistics correct as of May 2018

Squad No.	Name	Date of birth (age)	Since	Signed from
Goalkeepers
1	(Republic of Ireland) Emma Byrne	14 June 1979 (aged 31)	2000	(Denmark) Fortuna Hjørring
13	(Jamaica) Becky Spencer	22 February 1991 (aged 19)	2005	(England) Arsenal Academy
24	(England) Sarah Quantrill	21 July 1990 (aged 19)	2008	(England) Arsenal Academy
Defenders
2	(England) Corinne Yorston	15 June 1983 (aged 27)	2009	(England) Bristol Academy
3	(Republic of Ireland) Yvonne Tracy	27 February 1981 (aged 29)	2000	(Republic of Ireland) St Patrick's Athletic
5	(England) Gilly Flaherty	24 August 1991 (aged 18)	2006	(England) Arsenal Academy
6	(England) Faye White (c)	2 February 1978 (aged 32)	1996	(England) Three Bridges
19	(Republic of Ireland) Niamh Fahey	13 October 1987 (aged 22)	2008	(Republic of Ireland) Salthill Devon
	(England) Cally Rowell	14 January 1991 (aged 19)	2007	(England) Arsenal Academy
	(England) Lara Fay	9 August 1993 (aged 16)	2009	(England) Arsenal Academy
	(England) Rachel Pitman	6 December 1991 (aged 18)	2008	(England) Arsenal Academy
Midfielders
4	(Wales) Jayne Ludlow	7 January 1979 (aged 31)	2000	(England) Southampton Saints
7	(Republic of Ireland) Ciara Grant	17 May 1978 (aged 32)	1998	(Republic of Ireland) St Patrick's Athletic
16	(Scotland) Kim Little	26 September 1990 (aged 19)	2008	(Scotland) Hibernian
17	(England) Katie Chapman	15 June 1982 (aged 28)	2006	(England) Charlton Athletic
18	(Scotland) Natalie Ross	14 September 1989 (aged 20)	2008	(Scotland) Hibernian
22	(England) Laura Coombs	29 January 1991 (aged 19)	2007	(England) Arsenal Academy
23	(England) Abbie Prosser	4 September 1991 (aged 18)	2008	(England) Arsenal Academy
27	(England) Naomi Cole	30 March 1992 (aged 18)	2009	(England) Arsenal Academy
Forwards
10	(Scotland) Julie Fleeting	18 December 1980 (aged 29)	2004	(Scotland) Ross County
11	(England) Rachel Yankey	1 November 1979 (aged 30)	2005	(United States) New Jersey Wildcats
12	(England) Gemma Davison	17 April 1987 (aged 23)	2001	(England) Watford
14	(Scotland) Jen Beattie	13 May 1991 (aged 19)	2009	(Scotland) Celtic
20	(Wales) Helen Lander	26 April 1986 (aged 24)	2009	(England) Watford
25	(England) Lauren Bruton	22 November 1992 (aged 17)	2008	(England) Arsenal Academy
28	(England) Danielle Carter	18 May 1993 (aged 17)	2009	(England) Arsenal Academy
	(Republic of Ireland) Ruesha Littlejohn	3 July 1990 (aged 19)	2010	(Scotland) Glasgow City
	(Scotland) Emily Thomson	12 August 1993 (aged 16)	2009	(Scotland) Motherwell
	(Republic of Ireland) Lillie Bilson	19 July 1991 (aged 18)	2008	(England) Arsenal Academy

=== Appearances and goals ===
No.	Name	PLND		FA Cup		PL Cup		LC Cup		UWCL		Total	
No.	Name	Apps	Goals	Apps	Goals	Apps	Goals	Apps	Goals	Apps	Goals	Apps	Goals
Goalkeepers
1	(Republic of Ireland) Emma Byrne	20+1	0	3	0	4	0	2	0	6	0	35	0
13	(Jamaica) Rebecca Spencer	2	0	2	0	0+1	0	0	0	0	0	4+1	0
24	(England) Sarah Quantrill	0	0	0	0	0	0	1	0	0	0	1	0
Defenders
2	(England) Corinne Yorston	19+1	2	3+1	0	3+1	0	3	0	6	0	34+3	2
3	(Republic of Ireland) Yvonne Tracy	8	0	0	0	0	0	3	0	1+1	0	12+1	0
5	(England) Gilly Flaherty	17+1	0	4	0	2	0	1	0	4	1	28+1	1
6	(England) Faye White (c)	11+2	1	5	1	3	0	0	0	3	0	22+2	2
19	(Republic of Ireland) Niamh Fahey	19+1	0	5	0	4	0	3	0	6	0	37	0
	(England) Cally Rowell	0	0	0	0	0	0	0	0	0	0	0	0
	(England) Lara Fay	1+1	0	0	0	0	0	1+1	0	0	0	2+2	0
	(England) Rachel Pitman	0	0	0	0	0	0	0	0	0	0	0	0
Midfielders
4	(Wales) Jayne Ludlow	18+1	4	4	2	4	1	2	1	5	1	33+1	9
7	(Republic of Ireland) Ciara Grant	22	1	5	0	4	0	2	0	6	1	39	2
16	(Scotland) Kim Little	21	23	5	8	4	5	1	2	5	9	36	47
17	(England) Katie Chapman	10	4	2	1	3	1	2	0	4	1	21	7
18	(Scotland) Natalie Ross	0	0	0	0	0	0	1	0	0	0	1	0
22	(England) Laura Coombs	0+3	0	0	0	0	0	0	0	1+2	1	1+5	1
23	(England) Abbie Prosser	0+1	0	0	0	0	0	0	0	0+1	0	0+2	0
27	(England) Naomi Cole	0	0	0	0	0	0	0+1	0	0	0	0+1	0
Forwards
10	(Scotland) Julie Fleeting	12	6	2	2	2	2	1	0	0	0	17	10
11	(England) Rachel Yankey	20	7	5	2	3	0	1	1	6	2	35	12
12	(England) Gemma Davison	22	12	5	0	4	0	3	1	6	1	40	14
14	(Scotland) Jen Beattie	11+5	7	2+2	1	2+1	1	1	1	2+2	1	18+10	11
20	(Wales) Helen Lander	6+12	6	2+1	0	2+2	1	2	5	3+1	2	15+16	14
25	(England) Lauren Bruton	1+6	1	0+1	0	0+3	0	1+1	3	0+5	1	2+16	5
28	(England) Danielle Carter	2+10	3	1+4	0	0	0	0+2	0	2+1	0	5+17	3
	(Republic of Ireland) Ruesha Littlejohn	1	0	0	0	0	0	2+1	3	0	0	3+1	3
	(Scotland) Emily Thomson	0	0	0	0	0	0	0+1	0	0	0	0+1	0
	(Republic of Ireland) Lillie Bilson	0	0	0	0	0	0	0	0	0	0	0	0

=== Goalscorers ===
Rank	No.	Position	Name	PLND	FA Cup	PL Cup	LC Cup	UWCL	Total
1	16	MF	(Scotland) Kim Little	23	8	5	2	9	47
2	12	FW	(England) Gemma Davison	12	0	0	1	1	14
2	20	FW	(Wales) Helen Lander	6	0	1	5	2	14
4	11	FW	(England) Rachel Yankey	7	2	0	1	2	12
5	14	FW	(Scotland) Jen Beattie	7	1	1	1	1	11
6	10	FW	(Scotland) Julie Fleeting	6	2	2	0	0	10
7	4	MF	(Wales) Jayne Ludlow	4	2	1	1	1	9
8	17	MF	(England) Katie Chapman	4	1	1	0	1	7
9	25	FW	(England) Lauren Bruton	1	0	0	3	1	5
10	28	FW	(England) Danielle Carter	3	0	0	0	0	3
10		MF	(Republic of Ireland) Ruesha Littlejohn	0	0	0	3	0	3
12	7	MF	(Republic of Ireland) Ciara Grant	1	0	0	0	1	2
12	2	DF	(England) Corinne Yorston	2	0	0	0	0	2
12	6	DF	(England) Faye White	1	1	0	0	0	2
15	22	MF	(England) Laura Coombs	0	0	0	0	1	1
15	5	DF	(England) Gilly Flaherty	0	0	0	0	1	1
Total				77	17	11	17	21	143

=== Clean sheets ===
Rank	No.	Name	PLND	FA Cup	PL Cup	LC Cup	UWCL	Total
1	1	(Republic of Ireland) Emma Byrne	7	2	2	2	4	17
2	24	(England) Sarah Quantrill	0	0	0	1	0	1
Total			7	2	2	3	4	18

== Transfers, loans and other signings ==
=== Transfers in ===
Announcement date	No.	Position	Player	From club
2 July 2009	14	FW	(Scotland) Jen Beattie	(Scotland) Celtic
2 July 2009	2	DF	(England) Corinne Yorston	(England) Bristol Academy
23 September 2009		FW	(Scotland) Emily Thomson	(Scotland) Motherwell
23 January 2010		FW	(Republic of Ireland) Ruesha Littlejohn	(Scotland) Glasgow City

=== Transfers out ===
Announcement date	No.	Position	Player	To club
2009		DF	(England) Sahara Osborne–Ricketts	(England) Reading
2009		CB	(England) Carly Bray	(United States) Millburn Magic
2009		CB	(England) Christie Turner	
2009		FW	(Republic of Ireland) Jadine Madden	
2009		DF	(England) Lauren Williams	
2009	9	FW	(Scotland) Suzanne Grant	(Scotland) Celtic
15 July 2009		MF	(England) Lauren Walker	(England) Blackburn Rovers
July 2009	27	DF	(Republic of Ireland) Seana Cooke	(Republic of Ireland) St Francis
July 2009	21	DF	(Saint Lucia) Eartha Pond	(England) Chelsea
October 2009	15	DF	(England) Laura Bassett	(England) Leeds United

=== Loans out ===
Announcement date	No.	Position	Player	To club
2009	13	GK	(Jamaica) Becky Spencer	(England) Nottingham Forest
2010		FW	(Republic of Ireland) Ruesha Littlejohn	(Scotland) Rangers

== Club ==
=== Kit ===
Supplier: Nike / Sponsor: Fly Emirates

Home	Away	Third

== Competitions ==
=== Overall record ===
Competition	First match	Last match	Starting round	Final position	Record							
Competition	First match	Last match	Starting round	Final position	Pld	W	D	L	GF	GA	GD	Win %
FA Women's Premier League National Division	27 September 2009	16 May 2010	Matchday 1	Winners	18	16	1	1	79	19	+60	88.89
FA Women's Cup	17 January 2010	3 May 2010	Fourth round	Runners-up	5	4	0	1	18	6	+12	80.00
FA Women's Premier League Cup	14 September 2009	7 December 2009	First round	Semi-finals	4	3	0	1	11	3	+8	75.00
UEFA Women's Champions League	30 September 2009	14 March 2010	Round of 32	Quarter-finals	6	4	0	2	24	4	+20	66.67
London County Cup	10 February 2010	23 March 2010	Quarter-finals	Winners	3	3	0	0	18	0	+18	100.00
Total					36	30	1	5	150	32	+118	83.33

Last updated: 24 May 2026
Source: FA WPL

=== FA Women's Premier League National Division ===
==== Partial league table ====
Pos	Team	Pld	W	D	L	GF	GA	GD	Pts	Qualification or relegation
1	Arsenal (C, P)	22	20	1	1	79	19	+60	61	Qualification for the Champion League knockout phase Approved for FA WSL
2	Everton (P)	22	16	2	4	67	19	+48	50	Qualification for the Champions League qualifying round Approved for FA WSL
3	Chelsea (P)	22	16	1	5	60	27	+33	49	Approved for FA WSL
4	Leeds Carnegie	22	15	2	5	50	16	+34	47	
5	Sunderland	22	12	1	9	36	35	+1	37	

Updated to match(es) played on 17 May 2010. Source: FA WPL
(C) Champions; (P) Promoted

==== Results summary ====
Overall								Home						Away					
Pld	W	D	L	GF	GA	GD	Pts	W	D	L	GF	GA	GD	W	D	L	GF	GA	GD
22	20	1	1	79	19	+60	61	11	0	0	53	11	+42	9	1	1	26	8	+18

==== Results by matchday ====
Matchday	1	2	3	4	5	6	7	8	9	10	11	12	13	14	15	16	17	18	19	20	21	22
Ground	A	H	A	A	A	H	A	H	H	H	A	A	H	A	A	A	A	H	A	H	H	H
Result	W	W	W	W	W	W	L	W	W	W	W	W	W	W	W	W	W	W	D	W	W	W
Position	9	9	6	5	4	3	4	3	2	2	2	2	2	2	1	1	1	1	1	1	1	1

Source: FA WPL
W = Win; D = Draw; L = Loss

==== Matches ====
27 September 2009 1	Birmingham City	0–1	Arsenal	Stratford-upon-Avon
14:00 BST		Report	Little 2'	Stadium: Knights Lane; Referee: Neil Pratt

11 October 2009 2	Arsenal	8–1	Doncaster Rovers Belles	Borehamwood
14:00 BST	Davison 14', 22'; Little 32', 71'; White 41'; Yankey 42'; Lander 63'; Beattie 74'	Report	Hansen 20'	Stadium: Meadow Park; Referee: Tim Robinson

15 October 2009 3	Nottingham Forest	0–8	Arsenal	Gedling
19:45 BST	Sent off (straight red)	Report	Yorston 9'; Yankey 21'; Little 51', 56' (pen.), 75'; Lander 62'; Chapman 68' (pen.); Davison 72'	Stadium: Bill Stokeld Stadium; Referee: Robert Ellis

18 October 2009 4	Bristol Academy	1–4	Arsenal	Almondsbury
14:00 BST	Passariello 15'	Report	Little 6', 38'; Chapman 59'; Davison 81'	Stadium: Oaklands Park; Referee: Mark Powell

8 November 2009 5	Chelsea	2–3	Arsenal	East Molesey
14:00 GMT	Sanderson 1'; Champ 8'	Report	Beattie 49', 70', 90'	Stadium: Imber Court; Referee: Andy Mead

15 November 2009 6	Arsenal	5–1	Sunderland	Borehamwood
14:00 GMT	Fleeting 23', 28'; Little 52', 56'; Yankey 59'	Report	Gutteridge 7'	Stadium: Meadow Park; Referee: Alan Dale

22 November 2009 7	Sunderland	2–1	Arsenal	Hetton-le-Hole
14:00 GMT	Nobbs 59'; McDougall 86'	Report	Little 55'	Stadium: Hetton Centre; Referee: Anthony Murphy

3 December 2009 8	Arsenal	6–2	Watford	Borehamwood
19:00 GMT	Fleeting 11'; Chapman 62'; Little 69'; Davison 73'; Ludlow 79'; Lander 90'	Report	Flaherty 38' (o.g.); Barrett 71'	Stadium: Meadow Park; Referee: Dele Sotimirin

13 December 2009 9	Arsenal	8–0	Bristol Academy	Borehamwood
14:00 GMT	Little 13' (pen.), 74'; Ludlow 26'; Lander 31'; Davison 58'; Chapman 66'; Beattie 79'; Carter 80'	Report		Stadium: Meadow Park; Referee: David Thomas

24 January 2010 10	Arsenal	2–1	Chelsea	Borehamwood
14:00 GMT	Davison 56'; Carter 81'	Report	Sanderson 84'	Stadium: Meadow Park; Referee: Paul Forrester

7 March 2010 11	Arsenal	4–1	Blackburn Rovers	Borehamwood
14:00 GMT	Roberts 13' (o.g.); Davison 59'; Carter 64'; Ludlow 79'	Report	Roberts 45'	Stadium: Meadow Park; Referee: Garry Starr

8 April 2010 12	Millwall Lionesses	1–3	Arsenal	Beckenham
19:45 BST	Beckett 54'	Report	Little 37', 64', 77'	Stadium: Eden Park Avenue; Referee: Andy Mead

11 April 2010 13	Everton	0–1	Arsenal	Crosby
14:00 BST		Report	Yankey 6'; Ludlow (red card) 75'	Stadium: Rossett Park; Attendance: 180; Referee: Jane Sims

15 April 2010 14	Arsenal	5–1	Millwall Lionesses	Borehamwood
19:30 BST	Little 11', 29' (penalty missed) 20'; Grant 52'; Yankey 78'; Lander 90'	Report	Beckett 54' (pen.)	Stadium: Meadow Park; Referee: Andrew Medlock

18 April 2010 15	Leeds Carnegie	0–1	Arsenal	Farsley
14:00 BST		Report	Yankey 15'	Stadium: Throstle Nest; Attendance: 224; Referee: Michael Moore

21 April 2010 16	Watford	0–1	Arsenal	Northwood
19:30 BST		Report	Fleeting 51'	Stadium: The Skyline Stadium; Referee: Andrew Medlock

25 April 2010 17	Doncaster Rovers Belles	1–2	Arsenal	Doncaster
14:00 BST	Hamilton 84'	Report	Beattie 13'; Weston 26' (o.g.)	Stadium: Keepmoat Stadium; Referee: Sean Barber

29 April 2010 18	Arsenal	4–1	Nottingham Forest	Borehamwood
19:45 BST	Little 12'; Fleeting 32'; Beattie 49'; Davison 84'	Report	Bailey 90+4'	Stadium: Meadow Park; Referee: Garry Starr

6 May 2010 19	Blackburn Rovers	1–1	Arsenal	Blackburn
19:00 BST	Sheen 70'	Report	Yorston 60'	Stadium: Ewood Park; Attendance: 477; Referee: Robert Goodwin-Davey

9 May 2010 20	Arsenal	4–2	Everton	Borehamwood
12:30 BST	Yankey 31'; Davison 39', 78'; Fleeting 80'	Report	Williams 52'; Dowie 62'	Stadium: Meadow Park; Referee: Carl Henry

12 May 2010 21	Arsenal	3–0	Leeds Carnegie	Holloway
19:00 BST	Little 11', 71' (pen.); Davison 87'	Report	Walton (yellow card); Holtham (yellow card)	Stadium: Emirates Stadium; Attendance: 3,572; Referee: Andy Mead

16 May 2010 22	Arsenal	4–1	Birmingham City	London Colney
14:00 BST	Bruton 12'; Beattie 36'; Little 52'; Ludlow 86'	Report	Goulding 87'	Stadium: Arsenal Training Centre; Referee: Peter Smith

=== FA Women's Cup ===
17 January 2010 Fourth round	Arsenal	4–1 (a.e.t.)	Sunderland	Borehamwood
13:00 GMT	Chapman 66'; Little 98', 99', 114'	Report	Grant 90' (o.g.)	Stadium: Meadow Park; Attendance: 157

7 February 2010 Fifth round	Arsenal	3–2	Leeds Carnegie	Borehamwood
14:00 BST	Beattie 15'; Ludlow 59'; Yankey 79'; F. White (yellow card); Grant (yellow card)	Report	E. White 53'; Clarke 82'; Bassett (yellow card); Moore (yellow card); Bradley (yellow card)	Stadium: Meadow Park; Referee: Tim Robinson

14 February 2010 Quarter-finals	Arsenal	5–0	Doncaster Rovers Belles	Borehamwood
14:00 BST	Yankey 6'; Little 38', 62', 80'; Williams 90' (o.g.)	Report		Stadium: Meadow Park; Attendance: 155; Referee: G. Sprague

4 April 2010 Semi-finals	Chelsea	0–4	Arsenal	Staines-upon-Thames
14:00 GMT		Report	Fleeting 34'; Little 36'; F. White 44'; Ludlow 64'	Stadium: Wheatsheaf Park; Attendance: 605

3 May 2010 Final	Arsenal	2–3 (a.e.t.)	Everton	West Bridgford
15:00 BST	Little 43' (pen.); Fleeting 54'; Grant (yellow card) 113'	Report	Dowie 16', 119'; Westwood (yellow card) 39'; Unitt (yellow card) 42'; F. White 45+2' (o.g.); Williams (yellow card) 73'; Johnson (yellow card) 87'	Stadium: City Ground; Attendance: 17,505; Referee: Una Hon

=== FA Women's Premier League Cup ===
14 September 2009 First round	Watford	1–4	Arsenal	Northwood
14:00 BST	Wade 3' (pen.)	Report	Little 4', 26', 55'; Lander 90'	Stadium: The Skyline Stadium

5 October 2009 Second round	Millwall Lionesses	0–2	Arsenal	Beckenham
14:00 BST		Report	Beattie 8'; Ludlow 85'	Stadium: Eden Park Avenue

1 November 2009 Quarter-finals	Arsenal	4–0	Keynsham Town	Borehamwood
14:00 GMT	Fleeting 25', 42'; Chapman 45'; Little 78'	Report		Stadium: Meadow Park

7 December 2009 Semi-finals	Everton	2–1	Arsenal	Crosby
12:30 BST	Dowie 3'; Westwood 108'	Report	Byrne (red card) 25'; Little 36' (pen.)	Stadium: Rossett Park; Referee: Emma Hock

=== London County Cup ===
10 February 2010 Quarter-finals	West Ham United	0–2	Arsenal	Thurrock
19:45 GMT		Report	Yankey 10'; Bruton 89'	Stadium: Ship Lane

4 March 2010 Semi-finals	Tottenham Hotspur	0–10	Arsenal	Cheshunt
14:00 GMT		Report	Lander; Littlejohn; Bruton; Ludlow; Davison	Stadium: Goffs Lane

23 March 2010 Final	Arsenal	6–0	Millwall Lionesses	Finchley
19:30 GMT	Lander 12', 57'; Little 51', 54'; Beattie 73'; 81' (o.g.)	Report		Stadium: The Maurice Rebak Stadium

=== UEFA Women's Champions League ===
==== Knockout phase ====
===== Round of 32 =====
30 September 2009 First Leg	PAOK (Greece)	0–9	(England) Arsenal	Thessaloniki
18:00 BST	Tsoukala (yellow card) 49'; Kynossidou (yellow card) 56'	Report	Yankey 8', 72'; Little 13', 32', 35', 90+4'; Lander 44', 62'; Ludlow 87'; F. White (yellow card) 90'	Stadium: Toumba Stadium; Attendance: 1,500; Referee: Lena Arwedahl (Sweden)

7 October 2009 Second Leg	Arsenal (England)	9–0 (18–0 agg.)	(Greece) PAOK	Borehamwood
15:00 BST	Little 11', 13', 47'; Chapman 17'; Beattie 21'; Kynossidou 44' (o.g.); Davison 74'; Bruton 77'; Coombs 84'	Report	Vlasiadou (yellow card) 24'; Gkatzogianni (yellow card) 90'	Stadium: Meadow Park; Attendance: 197; Referee: Yuliya Medvedeva-Keldyusheva (Kazakhstan)

===== Round of 16 =====
4 November 2009 First Leg	Sparta Prague (Czech Republic)	0–3	(England) Arsenal	Prague
18:00 BST	Kladrubská (yellow card) 54'; Kožárová (yellow card) 72'	Report	Flaherty 11'; Yorston (yellow card) 14'; Grant 27'; Little 55' (pen.)	Stadium: Stadion Letná; Attendance: 1,975; Referee: Christine Baitinger (Germany)

11 November 2009 Second Leg	Arsenal (England)	2–0 (5–0 agg.)	(Czech Republic) Sparta Prague	Borehamwood
13:30 GMT	Heroldová 31' (o.g.); Davison (yellow card) 45+1'; Little 56' (yellow card) 71'	Report	Ringelová (yellow card) 57'; Heroldová (yellow card) 65'; Mocová (yellow card) 69'	Stadium: Meadow Park; Attendance: 312; Referee: Efthalia Mitsi (Greece)

===== Quarter-finals =====
10 March 2010 First Leg	Duisburg (Germany)	2–1	(England) Arsenal	Duisburg
19:30 GMT	Grings 24' (pen.); Hegering 49'	Report	Little (yellow card) 24'; Grings 66' (o.g.); Ludlow (yellow card) 71'	Stadium: MSV-Arena; Attendance: 5,145; Referee: Jenny Palmqvist (Sweden)

14 March 2010 Second Leg	Arsenal (England)	0–2 (1–4 agg.)	(Germany) Duisburg	Bishop's Stortford
13:00 GMT	Flaherty (yellow card) 48'	Report	Oster 49'; Popp (yellow card) 79'; Himmighofen 88'	Stadium: Woodside Park; Attendance: 724; Referee: Kirsi Heikkinen (Finland)

== See also ==
- List of Arsenal W.F.C. seasons
- 2009–10 in English football
