= 2009–10 FA Women's Premier League Cup =

Tournament details
- Country: England

Final positions
- Champions: Leeds United
- Runners-up: Everton

The 2009–10 FA Women's Premier League Cup was the 19th edition of the FA Women's Premier League Cup, a cup tournament for teams at both levels of the FA Women's Premier League (level 1, the National Division, and level 2, the Northern and Southern Divisions). The 2010 cup final was won by Leeds United, who defeated Everton 3–1.

This was the last season of the Women's Premier League Cup as a top-level competition, before the formation of the FA Women's Super League in 2011 as the new top flight. Subsequently, three of the four semi-finalist teams in 2009–10 (Arsenal, Chelsea and runners-up Everton) moved to the Super League and did not compete in the next season's FA WPL. The WPL Cup in 2010–11 was contested by clubs at women's levels 2 and 3.

== Results ==
=== Preliminary round ===
All matches were played on the 23 August 2009.

23 August 2009	Derby County (NO)	1–2 (a.e.t.)	Curzon Ashton (NO)
	Morgan	Report	Goodwin; Hayes
Note: Despite Curzon Ashton winning, records show that Derby County progress to the next round.

23 August 2009	OOH Lincoln (NO)	3–1	Newcastle United (NO)
	Aisthorpe; Michalska	Report	Crooks

23 August 2009	Barnet (S)	5–0	Colchester United (S)
	O'Leary; Sandow; Sowden; Rudman	Report

23 August 2009	Brighton & Hove Albion (S)	1–3	Portsmouth (S)
	Found	Report	McGee; Nash; Thorp

=== First round ===
All matches were played on the 13 September 2009.

13 September 2009	Blackburn Rovers (NA)	4–2	Manchester City (NO)
	Sheen 5'; Brewer 33'; Anderton; Walker	Report	Worth 15'; Farrell 31'

13 September 2009	Birmingham City (NA)	6–2	OOH Lincoln (NO)
	Bird 5'; Bartlett; Potter; Larkin; Gauntlett	Report	Michalska 15'

13 September 2009	Cardiff City (S)	0–4	Bristol Academy (NA)
		Report	Passariello; Dykes; Stewart

13 September 2009	Chelsea (NA)	6–2	Barnet (S)
	Whitter 11'; Susi	Report	Sowden

13 September 2009	Leeds Carnegie (NA)	1–0	Nottingham Forest (NA)
	Smith 30'	Report

13 September 2009	Leeds City Vixens (NO)	0–5	Doncaster Rovers Belles (NA)
		Report	Simpkins; Exley (pen.); Leat; Bright

13 September 2009	Sheffield Wednesday (NO)	0–5	Everton (NA)
		Report	Harries 2'; Dowie 60' 90+2' (pen.); Handley

13 September 2009	Aston Villa (NO)	3–0	Derby County (NO)
	Clarke; Davies; Vaughan	Report

13 September 2009	Leicester City (NO)	3–2	Preston North End (NO)
	Jones; Meade; Sweetman-Kirk	Report	Cadwallader; Taberner

13 September 2009	Sunderland (NA)	5–1	Liverpool (NO)
	Gutteridge; Nobbs; Staniforth; Stokes	Report	Traynor

13 September 2009	Portsmouth (S)	5–2	Fulham (S)
	Lorton; McGee; Nash; Thorp	Report	Benhem

13 September 2009	Charlton Athletic (S)	1–0	Luton Town (NO)
	Coombes	Report

13 September 2009	Keynsham Town (S)	7–1	Crystal Palace (S)
	Goal	Report	Goal

13 September 2009	Reading (S)	3–0	Queens Park Rangers (S)
	Fletcher; Hines; Shaw	Report

13 September 2009	Watford (NA)	1–4	Arsenal (NA)	Northwood
14:00	Wade 3' (pen.)	Report	Little 4', 26', 55'; Lander 90'	Stadium: The Skyline Stadium

13 September 2009	West Ham United (S)	0–0 (a.e.t.) (1–4 p)	Millwall Lionesses (NA)
		Report
	Penalties
	Penalty scored Penalty missed		Penalty scored

=== Second round ===
All matches were played on the 4 October 2009.

4 October 2009	Portsmouth (S)	0–1	Chelsea (NA)
		Report	Sanderson 69'

4 October 2009	Millwall Lionesses (NA)	0–2	Arsenal (S)	Beckenham
14:00		Report	Beattie 8'; Ludlow 85'	Stadium: Eden Park Avenue

4 October 2009	Keynsham Town (S)	3–1	Charlton Athletic (S)
	Sage; Reinecke; Andjelkovic	Report	Coombes

4 October 2009	Bristol Academy (NA)	w/o	Reading (S)
		Report

4 October 2009	Everton (NA)	4–0	Sunderland (NA)
	Dowie; Williams; Scott; Handley	Report

4 October 2009	Doncaster Rovers Belles (NA)	3–1	Leicester City (NO)
	Hansen; Exley; Williams	Report	Robson

4 October 2009	Birmingham City (NA)	1–2 (a.e.t.)	Blackburn Rovers (NA)
	Torkildsen (pen.)	Report	Anderton; Harding 115'

4 October 2009	Aston Villa (NO)	2–4	Leeds Carnegie (NA)
	Farrow 27', 62'	Report	Allen 8'; Moore 61'; White 64'; Holtham 70'

=== Quarter–finals ===
All matches were played on 1 November 2009, apart from Leeds Carnegie vs Blackburn Rovers, which was played on the 8 November 2009.

1 November 2009	Arsenal (NA)	4–0	Keynsham Town (S)	Borehamwood
14:00	Fleeting 25', 42'; Chapman 45'; Little 78'	Report		Stadium: Meadow Park

1 November 2009	Chelsea (NA)	8–0	Bristol Academy (NA)
	Stoney 14'; (o.g.); Sanderson 80' (pen.); Susi; Perry; Whitter	Report

1 November 2009	Everton (NA)	3–0	Doncaster Rovers Belles (NA)
	Dowie 24', 65'; Duggan 64'	Report

8 November 2009	Leeds Carnegie (NA)	5–0	Blackburn Rovers (NA)
	White 26', 81'; Smith; Cantrell 52'	Report

=== Semi–finals ===
Matches were played on the 6 and 13 December 2009.

6 December 2009	Everton (NA)	2–1 (a.e.t.)	Arsenal (NA)	Crosby
12:30	Dowie 3'; Westwood 108'	Report	Little 36' (pen.)	Stadium: Rossett Park; Referee: Emma Hock

13 December 2009	Chelsea (NA)	0–2	Leeds Carnegie (NA)
		Report	Cantrell 71'; Bradley 86'

=== Final ===
11 February 2010
19:00 GMT

Everton	1–3	Leeds Carnegie
Williams 49'	Report	Holtham 15'; White 21', 85'

Spotland, Rochdale
Attendance: 3,000

== See also ==
- 2009–10 FA Women's Premier League
- 2009–10 FA Women's Cup
