= 2010–11 FA Women's Premier League Cup =

Tournament details
- Country: England

Final positions
- Champions: Barnet
- Runners-up: Nottingham Forest

The 2010–11 FA Women's Premier League Cup was the 20th edition of the FA Women's Premier League Cup, a cup tournament for teams both levels of the Women's Premier League, the National Division and the Northern and Southern Divisions, the second and third level of English women's football respectively.

This was the first season of the cup following the demotion of the FA Women's Premier League National Division from the highest level of women's football in England; it became the second tier due to the creation of the FA Women's Super League in 2011. As a result, a number of previous competitors such as Arsenal did not compete in the Premier League Cup.

The cup was won by National Division side Barnet, who defeated Nottingham Forest 4–3 on penalties after the match finished 0–0 after extra time.

== Group stage ==
Twenty-eight teams from both tiers of the Premier League were drawn into seven groups of four with the first and second placed teams in each group going through to the knock-out stage. In addition, the best two third placed teams based on points obtained also went through to the knock out stage.

=== Group 1 ===
| Pos | Team | Pld | W | D | L | GF | GA | GD | Pts | Qualification | BAR | WHU | COU | QPR |
|---|---|---|---|---|---|---|---|---|---|---|---|---|---|---|
| 1 | Barnet | 3 | 3 | 0 | 0 | 9 | 0 | +9 | 9 | Advanced to Knockout phase | — | – | 4–0 | – |
| 2 | West Ham United | 3 | 2 | 0 | 1 | 4 | 3 | +1 | 6 | | 0–1 | — | – | – |
| 3 | Colchester United | 3 | 1 | 0 | 2 | 4 | 7 | −3 | 3 | | – | 1–3 | — | 3–0 |
| 4 | Queens Park Rangers | 3 | 0 | 0 | 3 | 1 | 8 | −7 | 0 | | 0–4 | 1–1 | – | — |

Source: Fulltime FA

| 29 August 2010 | Queens Park Rangers (S) | 1–1 | West Ham United (S) |
| 14:00 | Maggs 90+4' | Report | Merritt 66' |

| 29 August 2010 | Barnet (NA) | 4–0 | Colchester United (S) |
| 14:00 | Sandow 6', 28', 42'; Keown 71' | Report |

| 12 September 2010 | West Ham United (S) | 0–1 | Barnet (NA) |
| 14:00 | | Report | Sowden 32' |

| 12 September 2010 | Colchester United (S) | 3–0 | Queens Park Rangers (S) |
| 14:00 | Gamby; Larkin | Report |

| 3 October 2010 | Colchester United (S) | 1–3 | West Ham United (S) |
| 14:00 | Goal | Report | Merritt 59'; Roache 71'; Wosahlo 80' |

| 17 October 2010 | Queens Park Rangers (S) | 0–4 | Barnet (NA) |
| 14:00 | | Report | Sowden; Williams |

=== Group 2 ===
| Pos | Team | Pld | W | D | L | GF | GA | GD | Pts | Qualification | BLR | CUA | ROC | PNE |
|---|---|---|---|---|---|---|---|---|---|---|---|---|---|---|
| 1 | Blackburn Rovers | 3 | 3 | 0 | 0 | 13 | 3 | +10 | 9 | Advanced to Knockout phase | — | – | – | 6–0 |
| 2 | Curzon Ashton | 3 | 2 | 0 | 1 | 7 | 7 | 0 | 6 | | 3–3 | — | – | – |
| 3 | Rochdale | 3 | 1 | 0 | 2 | 4 | 8 | −4 | 3 | | 0–4 | 3–2 | — | 1–2 |
| 4 | Preston North End | 3 | 0 | 0 | 3 | 3 | 9 | −6 | 0 | | – | 1–2 | – | — |

Source: Fulltime FA

| 29 August 2010 | Rochdale (NO) | 0–4 | Blackburn Rovers (NA) |
| 14:00 | | Report |

| 29 August 2010 | Preston North End (NO) | 1–2 | Curzon Ashton (NO) |
| 14:00 | Walker | Report | Maylett; Redgrave |

| 12 September 2010 | Rochdale (NO) | 3–2 | Curzon Ashton (NO) |
| 14:00 | Bell; Fleck; Parry | Report | Hayes 31'; Harrop 89' |

| 12 September 2010 | Blackburn Rovers (NA) | 6–0 | Preston North End (NO) |
| 14:00 | Anderton; Holmes; Sheen; Twohig; Forster | Report |

| 29 September 2010 | Curzon Ashton (NO) | 3–3 | Blackburn Rovers (NA) |
| 19:45 | Harrop 81'; Maylett 83' | Report | Langford; Sheen; Twohig |

| 10 October 2010 | Rochdale (NO) | 1–2 | Preston North End (NO) |
| 14:00 | Savage | Report | Goal |

=== Group 3 ===
| Pos | Team | Pld | W | D | L | GF | GA | GD | Pts | Qualification | CVU | ASV | CAC | WAT |
|---|---|---|---|---|---|---|---|---|---|---|---|---|---|---|
| 1 | Coventry United | 3 | 1 | 2 | 0 | 5 | 4 | +1 | 5 | Advanced to Knockout phase | — | 1–1 | – | – |
| 2 | Aston Villa | 3 | 1 | 2 | 0 | 4 | 3 | +1 | 5 | | – | — | 2–2 | – |
| 3 | Cardiff City | 3 | 1 | 1 | 1 | 6 | 5 | +1 | 4 | | 2–3 | – | — | 2–0 |
| 4 | Watford | 3 | 0 | 1 | 2 | 1 | 4 | −3 | 1 | | 1–1 | 0–1 | – | — |

Source: Fulltime FA

| 29 August 2010 | Coventry City (NO) | 1–1 | Aston Villa (NO) |
| 14:00 | Male 18' | Report | Vaughan |

| 29 August 2010 | Cardiff City (S) | 2–0 | Watford (NA) |
| 14:00 | Bird; Harding | Report |

| 12 September 2010 | Watford (NA) | 1–1 | Coventry City (NO) |
| 14:00 | Wiltshire 73' | Report | Durrant 83' |

| 19 September 2010 | Aston Villa (NO) | 2–2 | Cardiff City (S) |
| 14:00 | Goal | Report | Bird; Harding |

| 3 October 2010 | Cardiff City (S) | 2–3 | Coventry City (NO) |
| 14:00 | Bird 38'; Beddows 67' | Report | Dermody 8'; Formaston 85'; Male 90' |

| 10 October 2010 | Watford (NA) | 0–1 | Aston Villa (NO) |
| 14:00 | | Report | Follis |

=== Group 4 ===
| Pos | Team | Pld | W | D | L | GF | GA | GD | Pts | Qualification | MIL | BHA | GIL | CHA |
|---|---|---|---|---|---|---|---|---|---|---|---|---|---|---|
| 1 | Millwall Lionesses | 3 | 2 | 1 | 0 | 7 | 5 | +2 | 7 | Advanced to Knockout phase | — | 3–2 | – | – |
| 2 | Brighton & Hove Albion | 3 | 2 | 0 | 1 | 5 | 4 | +1 | 6 | | – | — | 1–0 | 2–1 |
| 3 | Gillingham | 3 | 1 | 1 | 1 | 4 | 4 | 0 | 4 | | 2–2 | – | — | – |
| 4 | Charlton Athletic | 3 | 0 | 0 | 3 | 3 | 6 | −3 | 0 | | 1–2 | – | 1–2 | — |

Source: Fulltime FA

| 29 August 2010 | Gillingham (S) | 2–2 | Millwall Lionesses (NA) |
| 14:00 | Hincks 56'; Crinean 78' | Report | Goal |

| 29 August 2010 | Brighton & Hove Albion (S) | 2–1 | Charlton Athletic (S) |
| 14:00 | Kempson; Stenning | Report | Simmons 55' |

| 12 September 2010 | Charlton Athletic (S) | 1–2 | Millwall Lionesses (NA) |
| 14:00 | Bryan 10' | Report | Jones; Whitter |

| 12 September 2010 | Brighton & Hove Albion (S) | 1–0 | Gillingham (S) |
| 14:00 | Whitcombe | Report |

| 10 October 2010 | Millwall Lionesses (NA) | 3–2 | Brighton & Hove Albion (S) |
| 14:00 | Edwards; Jones; Heatherson | Report | Stenning 30'; Baker 80' |

| 10 October 2010 | Charlton Athletic (S) | 1–2 | Gillingham (S) |
| 14:00 | Bryan 21' | Report | Carlton 89'; Jeffery 90+2' |

=== Group 5 ===
| Pos | Team | Pld | W | D | L | GF | GA | GD | Pts | Qualification | NTF | LEC | MCI | DEC |
|---|---|---|---|---|---|---|---|---|---|---|---|---|---|---|
| 1 | Nottingham Forest | 3 | 3 | 0 | 0 | 7 | 2 | +5 | 9 | Advanced to Knockout phase | — | – | – | 4–1 |
| 2 | Leicester City | 3 | 2 | 0 | 1 | 7 | 3 | +4 | 6 | | 1–2 | — | – | – |
| 3 | Manchester City | 3 | 1 | 0 | 2 | 4 | 6 | −2 | 3 | | 0–1 | 1–3 | — | – |
| 4 | Derby County | 3 | 0 | 0 | 3 | 3 | 10 | −7 | 0 | | – | 0–3 | 2–3 | — |

Source: Fulltime FA

| 29 August 2010 | Nottingham Forest (NA) | 4–1 | Derby County (NO) |
| 14:00 | Connor-Iommi; Cresswell; Davies; Gilliatt | Report | Wayne |

| 29 August 2010 | Manchester City (NO) | 1–3 | Leicester City (NO) |
| 14:00 | Grocott | Report | Gauntlett 69'; Sweetman-Kirk 78'; Meade 82' |

| 12 September 2010 | Leicester City (NO) | 1–2 | Nottingham Forest (NA) |
| 14:00 | Potter 8' | Report | Clarke; Lawson |

| 12 September 2010 | Derby County (NO) | 2–3 | Manchester City (NO) |
| 14:00 | Scully; Anslow | Report | Beckford; Johnston; Savage |

| 10 October 2010 | Manchester City (NO) | 0–1 | Nottingham Forest (NA) |
| 12:00 | | Report | Davies |

| 10 October 2010 | Derby County (NO) | 0–3 | Leicester City (NO) |
| 14:00 | | Report | Meade 3'; Gallagher 44'; Reay 65' |

=== Group 6 ===
| Pos | Team | Pld | W | D | L | GF | GA | GD | Pts | Qualification | REA | POR | KYT | YET |
|---|---|---|---|---|---|---|---|---|---|---|---|---|---|---|
| 1 | Reading | 3 | 3 | 0 | 0 | 7 | 2 | +5 | 9 | Advanced to Knockout phase | — | 2–1 | 2–3 | – |
| 2 | Portsmouth | 3 | 2 | 0 | 1 | 7 | 3 | +4 | 6 | | – | — | 4–2 | – |
| 3 | Keynsham Town | 3 | 1 | 0 | 2 | 4 | 6 | −2 | 3 | | – | – | — | 1–1 |
| 4 | Yeovil Town | 3 | 0 | 0 | 3 | 3 | 10 | −7 | 0 | | 0–2 | 3–3 | – | — |

Source: Fulltime FA

| 29 August 2010 | Yeovil Town (S) | 0–2 | Reading (NA) |
| 14:00 | | Report | Howell |

| 29 August 2010 | Portsmouth (S) | 4–2 | Keynsham Town (S) |
| 14:00 | Clark; Lorton; Russell; Ryan | Report | Clipston; Oeser |

| 12 September 2010 | Reading (NA) | 2–1 | Portsmouth (S) |
| 14:00 | Howell; Sims | Report | Thorp |

| 12 September 2010 | Keynsham Town (S) | 1–1 | Yeovil Town (S) |
| 14:00 | Clipston | Report | Trowbridge |

| 3 October 2010 | Reading (NA) | 2–3 | Keynsham Town (S) |
| 14:00 | Howell; Watts | Report | Clipston; Wardle |

| 10 October 2010 | Yeovil Town (S) | 3–3 | Portsmouth (S) |
| 14:00 | Tewkesbury | Report | Hillier; Roe |

=== Group 7 ===
| Pos | Team | Pld | W | D | L | GF | GA | GD | Pts | Qualification | SUN | LEU | LCV | NEU |
|---|---|---|---|---|---|---|---|---|---|---|---|---|---|---|
| 1 | Sunderland | 3 | 2 | 1 | 0 | 8 | 1 | +7 | 7 | Advanced to Knockout phase | — | 1–1 | – | – |
| 2 | Leeds United | 3 | 2 | 1 | 0 | 8 | 3 | +5 | 7 | | – | — | 3–1 | 4–1 |
| 3 | Leeds City Vixens | 3 | 1 | 0 | 2 | 5 | 7 | −2 | 3 | | 0–3 | – | — | – |
| 4 | Newcastle United | 3 | 0 | 0 | 3 | 2 | 12 | −10 | 0 | | 0–4 | – | 1–4 | — |

Source: Fulltime FA

| 29 August 2010 | Sunderland (NA) | 1–1 | Leeds United (NA) |
| 14:00 | Holmes | Report | Foster |

| 29 August 2010 | Newcastle United (NO) | 1–4 | Leeds City Vixens (NO) |
| 14:00 | Coleman | Report | Panesar 12', 60'; Unitt 20'; Daniel 75' |

| 12 September 2010 | Leeds United (NA) | 4–1 | Newcastle United (NO) |
| 14:00 | Galton 5', 80'; Huegett 15', 45' | Report | Gardener 75' |

| 12 September 2010 | Leeds City Vixens (NO) | 0–3 | Sunderland (NA) |
| 14:00 | | Report | Gutteridge; McDougall; Ramshaw |

| 3 October 2010 | Newcastle United (NO) | 0–4 | Sunderland (NA) |
| 14:00 | | Report | Gutteridge; Ramshaw |

| 10 October 2010 | Leeds United (NA) | 3–1 | Leeds City Vixens (NO) |
| 14:00 | Huegett; Pennock; Sharp | Report | Watson-Phillips |

== Knockout phase ==
=== First round ===
Matches were played on 31 October 2010.

| 31 October 2010 | West Ham United (S) | 2–1 | Reading (NA) |
| 14:00 | Thomas 11'; Downham 89' | Report | Kirby 31' |

| 31 October 2010 | Sunderland (NA) | 3–1 (a.e.t.) | Leeds United (NA) |
| 14:00 | McDougall 9'; Wilson | Report | Bonner 13' |

| 31 October 2010 | Portsmouth (S) | 5–4 | Aston Villa (NO) |
| 14:00 | Cox; Hillier; Roe 65', 78'; Lorton 85' | Report | Fellows; Merritt; Manley; Farrow 81' |

| 31 October 2010 | Millwall Lionesses (NA) | 3–1 | Coventry City (NO) |
| 14:00 | 50' (o.g.); McKeag 55'; Beckett 84' | Report | Barber 88' |

| 31 October 2010 | Leicester City (NO) | 4–0 | Blackburn Rovers (NA) |
| 14:00 | Gallagher 44', 55'; Meade 61'; Sweetman-Kirk 88' | Report |

| 31 October 2010 | Gillingham (S) | 0–5 | Nottingham Forest (NA) |
| 14:00 | | Report | Lawson; Connor-Iommi; Waddell 90' |

| 31 October 2010 | Curzon Ashton (NO) | 0–4 | Cardiff City (S) |
| 14:00 | | Report | Lead 18'; Bird 52'; Harding 69'; Ingle 72' |

| 31 October 2010 | Barnet (NA) | 3–2 | Brighton & Hove Albion (S) |
| 14:00 | Wade 46'; Sowden 60'; Trimnell 90+1' | Report | Stenning 32'; Kempson 79' |

=== Quarter-finals ===
Matches were played on 12 December 2010 and 23 January 2011.

| 12 December 2010 | Cardiff City (S) | 0–5 | Barnet (NA) |
| 14:00 | | Report | Sowden 19', 44', 88'; Dempster 37'; Sandow 42' |

| 23 January 2011 | Portsmouth (S) | 2–1 | Sunderland (NA) |
| 14:00 | Hillier; Lorton | Report | McDougall 55' |

| 23 January 2011 | Millwall Lionesses (NA) | 0–2 | Nottingham Forest (NA) |
| 14:00 | | Report | Lawson; Jackson |

| 23 January 2011 | Leicester City (NO) | 2–1 | West Ham United (S) |
| 14:00 | Reay 40'; Sweetman-Kirk 78' | Report | Merritt 33' |

=== Semi-finals ===
Matches were played on 13 February 2011.

| 13 February 2011 | Nottingham Forest (NA) | 1–0 | Leicester City (NO) |
| 14:00 | Lawson 72' | Report |

| 13 February 2011 | Barnet (NA) | 2–1 | Portsmouth (S) |
| 14:00 | Sowden 3'; Trimnell 70' | Report | McGee 85' |

=== Final ===
24 March 2011
19:30 GMT

| Barnet | 0–0 (a.e.t.) | Nottingham Forest |
|---|---|---|
| | Report |
Penalties
| Murphy (penalty missed); Wade (penalty scored) | 4–3 | (penalty missed) Clarke; (penalty missed) Lawson |

Adams Park, Wycombe

== See also ==
- 2010–11 FA Women's Premier League
