= Ashley Clark =

American soccer player (born 1993)

Personal information
- Full name: Ashley Jordan Clark
- Date of birth: August 6, 1993 (age 33)
- Place of birth: Jacksonville, North Carolina, U.S.
- Height: 5 ft 5 in (1.65 m)
- Position: Forward

Team information
- Current team: Montpellier
- Number: 10

Youth career
- Triangle FC 93

College career
Years	Team	Apps	(Gls)
2011–2015	Campbell Fighting Camels	77	(44)

Senior career*
Years	Team	Apps	(Gls)
2016	Tierps IF	21	(13)
2017	Boston Breakers Reserves	–	(11)
2017–2021	Le Havre	51	(24)
2021–2024	Marseille	52	(40)
2024–2025	Tampa Bay Sun	17	(1)
2025	Víkingur	12	(7)
2026–	Montpellier	3	(1)
- * Club domestic league appearances and goals as of 13:53, March 23, 2026 (UTC)

Ashley Jordan Clark (born August 6, 1993) is an American professional soccer player who plays as a forward for Première Ligue club Montpellier. She played college soccer for the Campbell Fighting Camels before starting her career in Sweden with Tierps IF and in the American Women's Premier Soccer League for the Boston Breakers' reserve team. Clark has also previously played for fellow French clubs Le Havre and Marseille, as well as USL Super League club Tampa Bay Sun FC and Icelandic club Víkingur.

== Early life ==
Born in Jacksonville, North Carolina, to Scott and Chandra Clark, Clark grew up in Cary. She was introduced to soccer at the age of four. She went on to play club soccer for Triangle FC 93, helping the team reach multiple state cup finals. Clark attended Panther Creek High School, where she was a three-time all-conference honoree and led the team in goals and assists as a senior. She also lettered in basketball.

== College career ==
As a freshman with the Campbell Fighting Camels in 2011, Clark started all 22 games, scored 11 goals (6 of which were game-winners), and had 7 assists. Her goals and assists were tied for second across the entire Big South Conference, and her 102 shots broke the conference's single-season record. She also contributed to Campbell's journey to the Big South tournament championship match, scoring a goal against Winthrop along the way. At the end of the season, Clark was named to the Big South all-freshman team and all-conference first team. She had also won two conference attacking player of the week honors along the way.

Clark continued to find offensive success in her sophomore season. Her 10 goals was the third-most in the Big South and catapulted her to seventh in Campbell program history in goals. She was once again named first-team All-Big South. In the spring before her junior year, Clark picked up a serious knee injury that forced her to redshirt the 2013 season entirely. After returning to the pitch in 2014, she registered 15 starts, 8 goals, and her third first-team all-conference award.

In her final season with the Fighting Camels, Clark was named the Big South Attacking Player of the Year. Her 17 goals tied for 17th across the NCAA, and her 10 assists were tied for 16th. She finished as first across the nation in shots on goal per game, with 3.1. Clark's performances not only earned her a fourth and final All-Big South first team honor, but also all-state and all-southeast region honors. She departed from Campbell having scored 44 goals across 77 appearances.

== Club career ==
=== Early career ===
Clark registered for the 2016 NWSL Draft, but she was not selected by any team. Instead, she signed her first professional contract with Swedish third-tier side Tierps IF ahead of the 2016 season. In her lone season in Sweden, Clark participated in all 21 games and led the team with 13 goals and 3 assists as she fought to help Tierps IF evade relegation. 4 of her goals came in a single match against FC Djursholm in July 2016.

After her stint in Sweden, Clark received an invitation to the North Carolina Courage's 2017 NWSL preseason camp. However, she did not earn a contract with her hometown club. Instead, Clark spent 2017 playing for the Boston Breakers' reserve team in the Women's Premier Soccer League. She recorded 11 goals and 5 assists as the Breakers finished as champions of the WPSL East Division. She helped Boston advance to the final four of the WPSL Championships before they were defeated by the Gulf Coast Texans, 1–0, in July 2017.

=== Le Havre ===
Clark then took her career overseas again, moving to France in August 2017 to sign for Division 2 Féminine club Le Havre AC. She joined the team right at the beginning of its mission to gain promotion to the Division 1 Féminine for the first time. In her second year at Le Havre, Clark was among the top three scorers on her team. She went on to play a total of four years for Le Havre, often as a member of a strong American contingent on the team.

In the 2019–20 season, she helped Le Havre get promoted to the Division I after finishing the season at the top of the table. In her first season playing Division I professional soccer in any country, Clark scored 3 goals across 18 appearances. However, Le Havre finished the season in last place and were relegated back down to the Division 2.

=== Marseille ===
In July 2021, Clark signed for French Division 2 side Olympique de Marseille. She started off her Marseille career with a bang, netting 17 goals to become the second-highest scorer in the league for the 2021–22 season. In her second year at Marseille, Clark was named club captain, her first-ever captaincy position in her career. She went on to lead Marseille to a successful first half of 2022–23, scoring a goal in the last match of 2023 to help Marseille go into the midseason break at the top of the table. In April 2023, she missed three months of play with an ankle injury.

In the 2023–24 season, Clark led Marseille as the team battled to get promoted to the Division I. The club finished just shy of their goal after finishing in third place at the end of the season; while Marseille did end tied with FC Nantes on total points, their head-to-head record was worse than Nantes, causing Marseille to accept the third-place spot. Clark departed from Marseille at the end of the season.

=== Tampa Bay Sun ===
On June 4, 2024, Tampa Bay Sun FC announced that they had signed Clark ahead of the inaugural USL Super League season. In the Sun's first-ever competitive match, Clark was a member of the Tampa Bay starting lineup as the Sun drew with Dallas Trinity FC, 1–1. Her corner kick assist on Brooke Hendrix's goal was the first-ever assist in club history. On September 9, 2024, Clark scored her only goal of the season, the game-winner in a 3–2 victory over Lexington SC. After contributing to Tampa Bay's USL Super League championship win, Clark departed from the Sun at the end of the season. She had made 17 appearances, coming on as a substitute in all but two games.

=== Víkingur ===
Icelandic Besta deild kvenna club Knattspyrnufélagið Víkingur signed Clark in August 2025, penning her to a contract lasting through the end of the 2025 season. Clark recorded 12 appearances and 7 goals in her half-season stint with Víkingur.

=== Montpellier ===
In February 2026, Clark returned to France, joining Première Ligue club Montpellier HSC as the club fought to evade relegation to the Seconde Ligue. She made her Montpellier debut on February 21, starting and playing 81 minutes in a draw with FC Nantes. Two matches later, she scored her first goal for Montpellier, netting in a 3–2 loss to Paris Saint-Germain.
