= Ruesha Littlejohn =

Irish footballer (born 1990)

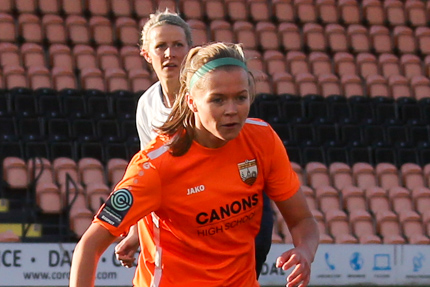
- Littlejohn with London Bees in February 2019

Personal information
- Full name: Ruesha Littlejohn
- Date of birth: 3 July 1990 (age 36)
- Place of birth: Glasgow, Scotland
- Height: 5 ft 6 in (1.68 m)
- Positions: Striker; midfielder

Youth career
- Clydebank Girls
- Baillieston Girls

Senior career*
| Years | Team | Apps | (Gls) |
| 2006–2007 | Arsenal North | | |
| 2007–2009 | Glasgow City | 43 | (53) |
| 2010 | Arsenal | 2 | (0) |
| 2010 | → Rangers (loan) | | |
| 2010–2011 | Glasgow City | | |
| 2011–2012 | Liverpool | 13 | (2) |
| 2011 | → Celtic (loan) | 2 | (1) |
| 2012–2013 | Glasgow City | 26 | (14) |
| 2014 | IL Sandviken | 22 | (19) |
| 2015 | Celtic | 19 | (11) |
| 2016 | Glasgow City | | |
| 2016–2018 | Celtic | 22 | (13) |
| 2018–2019 | London Bees | 17 | (5) |
| 2019–2020 | West Ham United | 2 | (0) |
| 2020–21 | Leicester City | 6 | (1) |
| 2021 | Birmingham City | 11 | (0) |
| 2021–2023 | Aston Villa | 25 | (0) |
| 2023–2025 | London City Lionesses | 22 | (2) |
| 2025 | Shamrock Rovers | 8 | (3) |
| 2025–2026 | Crystal Palace | 4 | (0) |

International career^{‡}
| 2007–2008 | Scotland U19 | 15 | (12) |
| 2012– | Republic of Ireland | 93 | (6) |
- * Club domestic league appearances and goals as of 4 May 2026 ‡ National team caps and goals as of 4 May 2026

Ruesha Littlejohn (born 3 July 1990) is an Irish professional footballer who played most recently as a midfielder for the Republic of Ireland national team. She has had four spells with Glasgow City, and stints with Norwegian First Division club IL Sandviken and English sides Arsenal, Liverpool, London Bees, Leicester City, Birmingham City, Aston Villa, London City Lionesses, Crystal Palace, and Irish side Shamrock Rovers.

Born and raised in Scotland to an Irish Scottish mother, she has represented Scotland and the Republic of Ireland at under-19 and senior levels, respectively.

== Club career ==
Glasgow-born Littlejohn played youth football with Clydebank and Baillieston girls before joining Arsenal North. She signed for Glasgow City in January 2007 and won four successive titles with the club. In January 2010 Littlejohn signed for English champions Arsenal and made an immediate debut in the Gunners' 2–1 home win over Chelsea. Shortly afterwards Tony Gervaise, who had also been Littlejohn's coach in Scotland's youth national teams, stood down as Arsenal manager. With Littlejohn then out of favour she returned to Scotland on loan with Rangers, where she featured in the first women's match to be staged at Ibrox Stadium.

=== Glasgow City ===
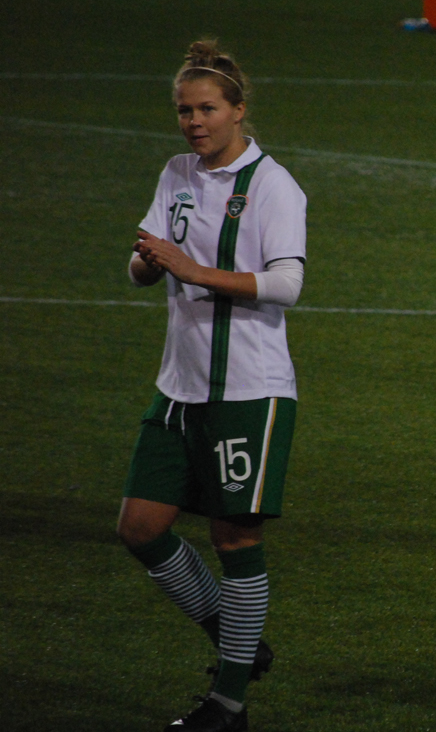
Littlejohn in 2012.

Littlejohn then returned to Glasgow City. She hit seven goals in the final game of the season against Inverness, as City secured another Premier League title.

Along with Megan Sneddon and Suzanne Lappin, Littlejohn signed for Liverpool Ladies ahead of the 2011 FA WSL season. The Scottish trio made their Liverpool bow in a friendly win over Hibernian Ladies. On her competitive debut against Charlton Athletic in the FA Women's Cup, Littlejohn marked the occasion by scoring a hat-trick. She also fired a last-minute goal as Liverpool held rivals Everton 3–3 in the opening match of the WSL campaign. During the mid-season break Littlejohn and Lappin went back to Scotland, this time with Celtic, making their debuts against Rangers.

In May 2012, the Football Association (FA) gave Littlejohn a six-match ban and charged her £500 costs for comments made on Twitter. During the 2012 FA WSL mid-season break, Littlejohn returned to Glasgow City: "It is great to be back at City again. I know the club so well. I have been here since I turned 16 years old and City is like my home, as I always seem to come back here."

In March 2014 Littlejohn signed for the Norwegian First club IL Sandviken, based in Bergen. By August she had scored 11 goals in 13 games to top the goalscorer's chart. She finished the season as the league's top goalscorer with 19 goals from 22 matches as Sandviken were promoted to the Toppserien as 1. divisjon champions.

Littlejohn was called into the Ireland squad in February 2015, listed as a free agent. After a year with Celtic in 2015, Littlejohn returned to Glasgow City for her fourth spell with the club in January 2016. She departed during the mid-season break, and was back in Celtic colours for the second part of the campaign.

London Bees

In July 2018 Littlejohn signed with London Bees. In 2019, she joined West Ham United on non-contract terms. On 25 January 2020, she signed a deal until the end of the season.

Birmingham City

On 16 January 2021, it was announced the Littlejohn had signed for Birmingham City for the remainder of the 2020–21 season. She made her debut the next day in a 0–0 draw with Brighton.

Aston Villa

On 1 September 2021, it was announced that Littlejohn had signed for Aston Villa for the 2021–22 season. On 25 May 2023 she announced that she would be leaving Aston Villa W.F.C. at the end of the 2022–23 season.

London City Lionesses

On 23 August 2023, London City Lionesses announced that they had signed Littlejohn on a two-year deal. On 21 January 2025, the Lionesses announced that Littlejohn had left the club by mutual agreement.

Shamrock Rovers

On 12 March 2025, Shamrock Rovers announced that they had signed Littlejohn. On 30 June 2025, it was announced that Littlejohn was departing the club to pursue full-time football opportunities during the July transfer window, based on an existing agreement between the club and player.

=== Crystal Palace ===
On 20 September 2025, Crystal Palace announced the signing of Littlejohn, 3 months after her departure from Shamrock Rovers. On 25 November, Littlejohn was sent off against Leicester City for violent conduct on Hannah Cain. The Football Association announced that the standard punishment was insufficient and would look for a longer ban. Littlejohn was eventually given a five match ban as a result.

On 22 May 2026, Crystal Palace announced Littlejohn was departing the club at the end of the 2025–26 season, having made just 7 appearances across all competitions.

== International career ==
=== Scotland ===
Interview with Ruesha (May, 2025).

Littlejohn represented Scotland at Under-15 and Under-17 level. At the Under-19 age group, Littlejohn was part of the side which qualified for the 2008 UEFA Women's Under-19 Championship in France. She scored Scotland's only goal in a 3–1 defeat to England at the final tournament group stage. Littlejohn scored 12 goals in her 15 appearances for Scotland's Under-19s.

Scotland's senior national team coach Anna Signeul excluded Littlejohn due to personal differences: "Em, well, the senior manager wasn’t a fan of mine. I think she thought I had too much carry on, a little personality, and she wasn’t really into that."

=== Ireland ===
After three years of not playing internationally, Littlejohn's situation caught the eye of Arsenal teammates Emma Byrne, Yvonne Tracy and Niamh Fahey. They alerted the FAI to her eligibility through her maternal grandparents.

In February 2012 Littlejohn received her first call–up to the senior Republic of Ireland squad, for the 2012 Algarve Cup. She made her debut with the Irish national team against Hungary at the final game of the Algarve Cup on 7 March 2012. Ireland won 2–1 to avoid a last place finish. Altogether Littlejohn has so far been capped over 60 times by the Irish. She was named in Vera Pauw's squad for the 2023 Women's World Cup.

== Personal life ==
Littlejohn, who is of Irish descent, grew up in Old Drumchapel, Scotland. She and her twin sister Shebahn host a weekly football podcast on Talksport.

Littlejohn has been in a relationship with former English footballer Jade Moore since February 2024. She previously dated fellow Irish footballer Katie McCabe from 2016 until 2023.

== Career statistics ==
Appearances and goals by national team and year
| National team | Year | Apps | Goals |
|---|---|---|---|
| Republic of Ireland | 2012 | 7 | 0 |
| Republic of Ireland | 2013 | 8 | 1 |
| Republic of Ireland | 2014 | 9 | 1 |
| Republic of Ireland | 2015 | 9 | 2 |
| Republic of Ireland | 2016 | 10 | 2 |
| Republic of Ireland | 2017 | 5 | 0 |
| Republic of Ireland | 2018 | 5 | 0 |
| Republic of Ireland | 2020 | 5 | 0 |
| Republic of Ireland | 2021 | 3 | 0 |
| Republic of Ireland | 2022 | 6 | 0 |
| Republic of Ireland | 2023 | 10 | 0 |
| Republic of Ireland | 2024 | 8 | 0 |
| Republic of Ireland | 2025 | 8 | 0 |
| Total | | 93 | 6 |

Scores and results list Republic of Ireland's goals first. Score column indicates score after each Littlejohn goal. Updated as of 5 May 2023.

International goals scored by Ruesha Littlejohn
| No. | Cap | Date | Venue | Opponent | Score | Result | Competition | Ref. |
|---|---|---|---|---|---|---|---|---|
| 1 | 8 | 6 March 2013 | Tasos Markou, Paralimni | Northern Ireland | 5–1 | 5–1 | 2013 Cyprus Women's Cup | |
| 2 | 18 | 12 March 2014 | GSP Stadium, Nicosia | Canada | 1–0 | 1–2 | 2014 Cyprus Women's Cup | |
| 3 | 25 | 4 March 2015 | Veli Jože, Poreč | Hungary | 1–1 | 1–1 | 2015 Istria Cup | |
| 4 | 30 | 14 May 2015 | Central Broward Park, Lauderhill, Florida | Haiti | 1–0 | 1–0 | Friendly | |
| 5 | 38 | 9 March 2016 | Tasos Markou, Paralimni | Finland | 1–0 | 2–0 | 2016 Cyprus Women's Cup | |
| 6 | 39 | 7 April 2016 | Stadion pod Malim brdom, Petrovac | Montenegro | 3–0 | 5–0 | 2017 UEFA Women's Championship Qual. | |

== Honours ==
Glasgow City

- Scottish FA Cup: 2009, 2012 & 2013
- Scottish Women's Premier League Cup: 2009 & 2013

IL Sandviken

- 1. divisjon: 2014

Individual

- Glasgow City Top Goalscorer: 2009
- 1. divisjon topscorer: 2014
