= 2024–25 Tampa Bay Sun FC season =

Tampa Bay Sun FC
2024–25 season
- President: Christina Unkel
- Head coach: Denise Schilte-Brown
- Stadium: Riverfront Stadium
- USL Super League: 2nd
- USL Super League playoffs: Champions
- Top goalscorer: Cecilie Fløe (12 goals)
- Highest home attendance: 5,248
- Lowest home attendance: 2,401
- Average home league attendance: 3,183
- Biggest win: 3–0 (vs DC (A), October 2, 2024); 3–0 (vs BKFC (H), April 12, 2025)
- Biggest defeat: 0–2 (vs Dallas (A), December 8, 2024)
Home colors	Away colors
- All statistics correct as of May 31, 2025.

The 2024–25 Tampa Bay Sun FC season was the first season in Tampa Bay Sun FC history. The team competed in the inaugural season of the USL Super League.

The Sun won the inaugural USL Super League championship, winning home at Riverfront Stadium 1–0 against Fort Lauderdale United FC in the Florida Derby, with Cecilie Fløe scoring the game winner in the 100th minute.

== Players ==
=== Roster ===
As of March 8, 2025

Note: Flags indicate national team as defined under FIFA eligibility rules; some limited exceptions apply. Players may hold more than one non-FIFA nationality.

No.	Pos.	Nation	Player
2	DF	USA	Jackie Simpson
4	DF	CAN	Vivianne Bessette
5	MF	CAN	Jordyn Listro
6	MF	GHA	Wasila Diwura-Soale
7	MF	USA	Erika Tymrak
8	FW	USA	Hannah Keane
9	FW	ENG	Natasha Flint
10	MF	JPN	Yuki Watari
11	FW	USA	Parker Goins
12	MF	ENG	Jade Moore
13	FW	DEN	Cecilie Fløe
14	MF	USA	Skylar Alonso
15	DF	USA	Brooke Hendrix
16	DF	USA	Siena Bryan
17	MF	USA	Lindsay Nicholson

No.	Pos.	Nation	Player
18	GK	USA	Kaylan Marckese
19	MF	USA	Carlee Giammona
20	DF	NOR	Victoria Haugen
21	DF	USA	Domi Richardson
22	DF	USA	Paige Almendariz
23	DF	USA	Brooke Denesik
24	FW	USA	Ashley Clark
28	GK	USA	Ashley Orkus
29	MF	ISL	Andrea Hauksdóttir
30	DF	USA	Taylor Yablonski
32	MF	USA	Aaliyah Pitts
35	FW	USA	Sydny Nasello
37	DF	USA	Jordan Zade
45	FW	USA	Ava Tankersley

== Transfers ==
=== In ===
Date	Pos.	Player	Transferred from	Fee	Ref.
April 23, 2024	MF	(United States) Erika Tymrak	(United States) Orlando Pride	Free transfer	
April 23, 2024	MF	(Canada) Jordyn Listro	(United States) Orlando Pride	Free transfer	
April 23, 2024	DF	(United States) Domi Richardson	(United States) NJ/NY Gotham FC	Free transfer	
April 29, 2024	FW	(United States) Riley Parker	Unattached	Free transfer	
April 29, 2024	DF	(Canada) Vivianne Bessette	(United States) USF Bulls	Free transfer	
June 3, 2024	FW	(England) Natasha Flint	(England) Liverpool	Free transfer	
June 4, 2024	DF	(United States) Ashley Clark	(France) Marseille	Free transfer	
June 5, 2024	FW	(United States) Hannah Keane	(Australia) Western United FC	Free transfer	
June 10, 2024	MF	(Ghana) Wasila Diwura-Soale	(Ghana) Hasaacas Ladies	Free transfer	
June 11, 2024	DF	(United States) Amanda Kowalski	(United States) Chicago Red Stars	Free transfer	
August 23, 2024	DF	(United States) Paige Almendariz	(Portugal) Benfica	Free transfer	
February 6, 2025	DF	(Norway) Victoria Haugen	(United States) North Carolina Courage	Free Transfer	

=== Out ===
Date	Pos.	Player	Notes	Transferred to	Fee	Ref.
January 6, 2025	FW	(United States) Natalia Staude	End of loan	(United States) North Carolina Courage	NA	
January 6, 2025	DF	(Mexico) Jazmin Enrigue	NA	(Mexico) Tijuana	NA	
January 13, 2025	FW	(United States) Riley Parker	Mutual departure	(United States) Carolina Ascent	NA	
April 24, 2025	GK	(United States) Lauren Kellett	NA	Not reported	NA	

== Competitions ==
=== Friendlies ===
On January 31, 2025, Sun FC announced they would host NJ/NY Gotham FC of the National Women's Soccer League in the first-ever match between clubs from the NWSL and the USL Super League.

August 8, 2024 Preseason	Tampa Bay Sun	v	USF Bulls	Tampa
7:00 pm ET				Stadium: Riverfront Stadium
Note: Closed-door match, result not made public.

August 10, 2024 Preseason	Tampa Bay Sun	1–1	Fort Lauderdale United FC	Tampa
7:00 pm ET				Stadium: Riverfront Stadium

March 2, 2025 Midseason	Tampa Bay Sun	1–1 (2–4 p)	NJ/NY Gotham FC	Tampa
6:00 pm ET	Goins 15'	Report	Portilho 3'	Stadium: Riverfront Stadium; Referee: Alego Calume
	Penalties
	(penalty missed) (penalty scored) (penalty missed); Tymrak (penalty scored)		(penalty scored) (penalty missed) (penalty scored) (penalty scored); (penalty scored) Nyamekye

=== Results summary ===
Overall								Home						Away					
Pld	W	D	L	GF	GA	GD	Pts	W	D	L	GF	GA	GD	W	D	L	GF	GA	GD
28	12	10	6	42	28	+14	46	8	4	2	23	12	+11	4	6	4	19	16	+3

Last updated: May 31, 2025.
Source: USLSuperLeague.com

=== Regular season standings ===
Pos	Team	Pld	W	L	T	GF	GA	GD	Pts	Qualification
1	Carolina Ascent (S)	28	13	6	9	45	24	+21	48	Playoffs
2	Tampa Bay Sun (C)	28	12	6	10	42	28	+14	46	Playoffs
3	Dallas Trinity	28	12	9	7	42	30	+12	43	Playoffs
4	Fort Lauderdale United	28	11	8	9	35	33	+2	42 (Note: Head-to-head points: Fort Lauderdale 6, Spokane 3)	Playoffs
5	Spokane Zephyr	28	11	8	9	37	32	+5	42	

Source: USL Super League
Rules for classification: 1) head-to-head points; 2) total goal differential; 3) total goals scored; 4) disciplinary points; 5) drawing of lots.
(C) Champions; (S) Players' Shield winner

=== USL Super League ===
August 18, 2024 1	Tampa Bay Sun	1–1	Dallas Trinity FC	Tampa
6:30 PM EST	Hendrix (yellow card) 44', (goal) 70'	Report	Guillen (yellow card) 18'; Davison 45+7', (yellow card) 86'	Stadium: Riverfront Stadium; Attendance: 5,248; Referee: Shawn Tehini

August 24, 2024 2	Tampa Bay Sun	0–0	DC Power FC	Tampa
6:00 PM EST	Bessette (yellow card) 45+3'; Hendrix (yellow card) 86'; Edmonds (yellow card) 90+4'; Bryan (yellow card) 90+6'	Report	Guillou (yellow card) 5'; Murnin (yellow card) 24'; DiOrio (yellow card) 70'; Friedrichs (yellow card) 90+4'	Stadium: Riverfront Stadium; Attendance: 3,532; Referee: Laura Rodriguez

September 8, 2024 3	Lexington SC	2–3	Tampa Bay Sun	Lexington
4:00 PM EST	Perez 57'; McGuire 83'	Report	Nasello (yellow card) 19'; Giammona 19'; Staude 20'; Hendrix (yellow card) 56'; Clark 79'; Bessette (yellow card) 86'	Stadium: Lexington SC Stadium; Attendance: 3,946; Referee: Danielle Chesky

September 14, 2024 4	Tampa Bay Sun	0–1	Brooklyn FC	Tampa
7:00 PM EST	Giammona (yellow card) 28'; Clark (yellow card) 82'; Hendrix (yellow card) 90+6'	Report	Cox 23'	Stadium: Riverfront Stadium; Attendance: 3,208; Referee: Melinda Sopka Homa

September 27, 2024 5	Carolina Ascent	0–0	Tampa Bay Sun	Charlotte
7:30 PM EST	DeMarco (yellow card) 37'	Report	Moore (yellow card) 90+3'	Stadium: American Legion Memorial Stadium; Attendance: 3,543; Referee: Rebecca Pagan

October 2, 2024 6	DC Power FC	0–3	Tampa Bay Sun	Washington, D.C.
6:30 PM EST	Constant (yellow card) 19'; Martin (yellow card) 27'; Friedrichs (yellow card) 61'	Report	Fløe 56', 68'; Giammona 62'; Listro (yellow card) 90+3'	Stadium: Audi Field; Attendance: 717; Referee: Katherine McCormick
Note: Match originally scheduled for October 4

October 12, 2024 7	Tampa Bay Sun	v	Fort Lauderdale United	Tampa
				Stadium: Riverfront Stadium
Note: Postponed due to Hurricane Milton

October 23, 2024 12	Brooklyn FC	2–1	Tampa Bay Sun	New York
7:30 PM EST	Scheriff 29'; Garziano 45+2' (pen.); Scarpelli (yellow card) 47'	Report	Nasello 5'; Edmonds (yellow card) 45+1'; Listro (yellow card) 45+3'; Moore (yellow card) 79'	Stadium: Commisso Soccer Stadium; Attendance: 242; Referee: Jaclyn Metz
Note: Match rescheduled and moved to Commisso Soccer Stadium in Manhattan

October 27, 2024 8	Spokane Zephyr	1–0	Tampa Bay Sun	Spokane
4:00 PM EST	Viggiano (yellow card) 14'; Canales 64'; Murray (yellow card) 76'	Report	Bessette (yellow card) 90+6'	Stadium: One Spokane Stadium; Referee: Danielle Chesky

November 2, 2024 9	Tampa Bay Sun	3–1	Lexington SC	Tampa
7:00 PM EST	Fløe 52', 85'; Flint 90+2'	Report	Shepherd 67'	Stadium: Riverfront Stadium; Attendance: 2,925; Referee: Alexandra Billeter

November 9, 2024 10	Fort Lauderdale United	1–1	Tampa Bay Sun	Fort Lauderdale
7:30 PM EST	Taylor Smith (yellow card) 75'; Henderson 90+3'	Report	Giammona 17'; Moore (yellow card) 60'	Stadium: NSU Soccer Stadium; Attendance: 1,976; Referee: Adorae Monroy

November 16, 2024 11	Tampa Bay Sun	2–1	Carolina Ascent	Tampa
7:00 PM EST	Flint 22'; Giammona 44'; Edmonds (yellow card) 82'; Orkus (yellow card) 90+1'	Report	Baisden 35'; Studer (yellow card) 48'	Stadium: Riverfront Stadium; Attendance: 2,805; Referee: Gerald Flores

November 23, 2024 12	Brooklyn FC	v	Tampa Bay Sun	New York
				Stadium: Maimonides Park
Note: Match re-scheduled to October 23, 2024 due to field issues at Maimonides Park

December 8, 2024 13	Dallas Trinity FC	2–0	Tampa Bay Sun	Dallas
3:30 PM EST	Giammona 66' (o.g.); Thornton 68'	Report	Hendrix (yellow card) 65'; Nasello (yellow card) 90+2'	Stadium: Cotton Bowl; Referee: Calin Radosav

December 14, 2024 14	Tampa Bay Sun	3–2	Spokane Zephyr	Tampa
7:00 PM EST	Giammona 15'; Moore (yellow card) 39'; Flint 66', 69'; Hauksdóttir (yellow card) 89'; Edmonds (yellow card) 90+6'	Report	Thomas 22'; Weinert (yellow card) 36'; Vallerand 52'	Stadium: Riverfront Stadium; Attendance: 3,164; Referee: Edson Carvajal

February 8, 2025 7	Tampa Bay Sun FC	2–2	Fort Lauderdale United FC	Tampa, Florida
6:00 PM	Almendariz (yellow card) 41'; Giammona 71' (pen.); Fløe 90+5' (pen.)	Report	Gordon (yellow card) 43', (goal) 59'; Hamid 54'; Pralle (yellow card) 77'; Vaka (yellow card) 85'	Stadium: Riverfront Stadium; Attendance: 2,990; Referee: Jaclyn Metz

February 15, 2025 15	Dallas Trinity	1–1	Tampa Bay Sun	Dallas
6:30 PM EST	Missimo 4'; Davison (yellow card) 33'; Brian (yellow card) 50'	Report	Goins 50'; Giammona (yellow card) 76'; Bessette (yellow card) 90+1'	Stadium: Cotton Bowl; Attendance: 3,183; Referee: Iryna Petrunok

February 22, 2025 16	Tampa Bay Sun	1–1	Brooklyn FC	Tampa
7:00 PM EST	Flint (yellow card) 36'; Moore 42'; Giammona (yellow card) 74'; Richardson (yellow card) 90+1'	Report	Pluck 58', (yellow card) 82'	Stadium: Riverfront Stadium; Attendance: 2,731; Referee: John Griggs

March 8, 2025 17	Fort Lauderdale United	1–1	Tampa Bay Sun	Fort Lauderdale
7:30 PM EST	Hamid 8'; McCain (yellow card) 12'; Baucom (yellow card) 68'	Report	Fløe 32'; Bessette (yellow card) 68'	Stadium: NSU Soccer Stadium; Attendance: 2,260; Referee: Adorae Monroy

March 15, 2025 18	Tampa Bay Sun	1–0	Carolina Ascent FC	Tampa
7:00 PM EST	Flint 14' (yellow card) 44'; Moore (yellow card) 57'	Report	Serepca (yellow card) 43'	Stadium: Riverfront Stadium; Attendance: 2,505; Referee: Marie Durr

March 19, 2025 19	Tampa Bay Sun	1–2	Spokane Zephyr	Tampa
7:00 PM EST	Flint 89' (yellow card) 90+1'	Report	Braun (yellow card) 30'; Murray (yellow card) 38'; Aylmer 61'; Tappan (yellow card) 88'; Cook 90+3'	Stadium: Riverfront Stadium; Attendance: 2,401; Referee: Alyssa Nichols

March 29, 2025 20	Brooklyn FC	2–2	Tampa Bay Sun	Brooklyn
7:00 PM EST	Phillpotts 11'; Amani (yellow card) 19' (goal) 51'; Breslin (yellow card) 90+1'	Report	Flint 29' 90+4' (yellow card) 41'; Bessette (yellow card) 67'	Stadium: Maimonides Park; Attendance: 2,830; Referee: Stephanie McFarland

April 5, 2025 21	Tampa Bay Sun	2–0	Fort Lauderdale United	Tampa
6:00 PM EST	Listro 31'; Tankersley 80'	Report	Locklear (yellow card) 60'; Lindahl (yellow card) 79'	Stadium: Riverfront Stadium; Attendance: 2,708; Referee: Laura Rodriguez

April 12, 2025 22	Tampa Bay Sun	4–1	Lexington SC	Tampa
7:00 PM EST	Nasello 36'; Fløe (yellow card) 37' (goal) 45+2'; Giammona 43'; Keane 90'	Report	Elizabeth Moore (yellow card) 23'; López (yellow card) 57'; Vernis 58'; Mackin 71'	Stadium: Riverfront Stadium; Referee: Atahan Yaya

April 18, 2025 23	DC Power	0–1	Tampa Bay Sun	Washington D.C.
7:30 PM EST	Constant (yellow card) 57'	Report	Fløe 88'	Stadium: Audi Field; Attendance: 1,752; Referee: Muhammad Hassan

April 26, 2025 24	Spokane Zephyr	3–2	Tampa Bay Sun	Spokane
5:00 PM EST	Aylmer 14'; Weinert 25', 68'; Haley Thomas (yellow card) 71'; Hisey (yellow card) 81'	Report	Nasello 27'; Bessette (yellow card) 46'; Flint 78' (pen.)	Stadium: One Spokane Stadium; Attendance: 2,248; Referee: Gloria Martinez

May 4, 2025 25	Tampa Bay Sun	1–0	Dallas Trinity	Tampa
7:00 PM EST	Keane 13'; Listro (red card) 25'; Giammona (yellow card) 44'	Report	Hintzen (yellow card) 31'	Stadium: Riverfront Stadium; Attendance: 2,877; Referee: Alex Beehler
Note: Matched moved to May 4 due to inclement weather

May 10, 2025 26	Lexington SC	0–3	Tampa Bay Sun	Lexington
7:00 PM EST	Mackin (yellow card) 11'	Report	Haugen 45'; Goins 60'; Fløe 90+2'	Stadium: Lexington SC Stadium; Attendance: 2,259; Referee: Edson Carvajal

May 17, 2025 27	Carolina Ascent	1–1	Tampa Bay Sun	Charlotte
7:00 PM EST	Hutchinson 2'; Murphy (yellow card) 63'; Studer (yellow card) 70'	Report	Fløe 2'; Haugen (yellow card) 45'	Stadium: American Legion Memorial Stadium; Attendance: 6,304; Referee: Joe Surgan

May 24, 2025 28	Tampa Bay Sun	2–0	DC Power	Tampa
7:00 PM EST	Nasello 22'; Fløe 53'	Report	Wolfbauer (yellow card) 45+3'; Aquino (yellow card) 68'; Gourley (yellow card) 90+5'	Stadium: Riverfront Stadium; Attendance: 4,810; Referee: Jaclyn Metz

=== Playoffs ===
June 7, 2025 Semifinals	Tampa Bay Sun FC	2–1	Dallas Trinity FC	Tampa
7:30 PM				Stadium: Riverfront Stadium

June 14, 2025 Final	Tampa Bay Sun FC	1–0	Fort Lauderdale United FC	Tampa
6:30 PM				Stadium: Riverfront Stadium; Attendance: 5,006; Referee: Danielle Chesky

== Statistics ==
=== Appearances ===
As of match played June 14, 2025

Players with no appearances are not included on the list, italics indicate a loaned in player

No.	Player	Nat.	Total		Regular Season		Playoffs	
No.	Player	Nat.	Apps	Starts	Apps	Starts	Apps	Starts
Goalkeepers
18	Kaylan Marckese	(United States)	1	1	1	1	0	0
28	Ashley Orkus	(United States)	21	19	19	17	2	2
31	Sydney Schneider	(Jamaica)	5	5	5	5	0	0
Defenders
2	Jackie Simpson	(United States)	6	2	6	2	0	0
4	Vivianne Bessette	(Canada)	30	28	28	26	2	2
15	Brooke Hendrix	(United States)	29	29	27	27	2	2
16	Siena Bryan	(United States)	3	0	3	0	0	0
20	Victoria Haugen	(Norway)	16	15	14	13	2	2
21	Domi Richardson	(United States)	5	0	5	0	0	0
22	Paige Almendariz	(United States)	26	18	24	16	2	2
23	Brooke Denesik	(United States)	1	0	1	0	0	0
Midfielders
3	Gabby Provenzano	(United States)	6	1	4	1	2	0
5	Jordyn Listro	(Canada)	29	28	27	26	2	2
6	Wasila Diwura-Soale	(Ghana)	11	7	11	7	0	0
7	Erika Tymrak	(United States)	12	9	12	9	0	0
12	Jade Moore	(England)	23	19	21	17	2	2
19	Carlee Giammona	(United States)	30	29	28	27	2	2
29	Andrea Hauksdóttir	(Iceland)	13	4	13	4	0	0
32	Aaliyah Pitts	(United States)	2	0	1	0	0	0
37	Jordan Zade	(United States)	15	3	13	3	2	0
Forwards
8	Hannah Keane	(United States)	9	3	7	3	2	0
9	Natasha Flint	(England)	23	20	21	18	2	2
11	Parker Goins	(United States)	15	6	13	6	2	0
13	Cecilie Fløe	(Denmark)	23	21	21	19	2	2
20	Ella Martinez	(Colombia)	2	0	2	0	0	0
24	Ashley Clark	(United States)	16	2	15	2	1	0
35	Sydny Nasello	(United States)	30	29	28	27	2	2
45	Ava Tankersley	(United States)	5	0	5	0	0	0
Other players (Departed during season)
3	Jazmin Enrigue	(Mexico)	1	0	1	0	0	0
11	Kristen Edmonds	(United States)	13	13	13	13	0	0
31	Riley Parker	(United States)	10	7	10	7	0	0
33	Natalia Staude	(United States)	12	10	12	10	0	0
99	Lauren Kozal	(United States)	5	5	5	4	0	0

=== Goalscorers ===
Last updated June 14, 2025

Rank	No.	Nat.	Name	USLS	Playoffs	Total
1	13	(Denmark)	Cecilie Fløe	11	1	12
2	9	(England)	Natasha Flint	9	1	10
3	19	(United States)	Carlee Giammona	7	1	8
4	35	(United States)	Sydny Nasello	4	0	4
5	11	(United States)	Parker Goins	2	0	2
5	8	(United States)	Hannah Keane	2	0	2
7	24	(United States)	Ashley Clark	1	0	1
7	15	(United States)	Brooke Hendrix	1	0	1
7	33	(United States)	Natalia Staude	1	0	1
7	12	(England)	Jade Moore	1	0	1
7	5	(Canada)	Jordyn Listro	1	0	1
7	45	(United States)	Ava Tankersley	1	0	1
7	20	(Norway)	Victoria Haugen	1	0	1
Own goals				0	0	0
Total				41	3	44

=== Assists ===
Last updated June 14, 2025

Rank	No.	Nat.	Name	USLS	Playoffs	Total
1	13	(Denmark)	Cecilie Fløe	4	0	4
1	35	(United States)	Sydny Nasello	3	1	4
3	4	(Canada)	Vivianne Bessette	3	0	3
3	9	(England)	Natasha Flint	2	1	3
5	33	(United States)	Natalia Staude	2	0	2
5	24	(United States)	Ashley Clark	2	0	2
5	19	(United States)	Carlee Giammona	2	0	2
8	12	(United States)	Jade Moore	1	0	1
8	22	(United States)	Paige Almendariz	1	0	1
8	7	(United States)	Erika Tymrak	1	0	1
8	15	(United States)	Brooke Hendrix	1	0	1
8	5	(Canada)	Jordyn Listro	1	0	1
8	20	(Norway)	Victoria Haugen	1	0	1
Total				23	2	25

=== Clean sheets ===
Last updated June 14, 2025

Rank	No.	Nat.	Name	USLS	Playoffs	Total
1	1	(United States)	Ashley Orkus	5	1	6
2	31	(Jamaica)	Sydney Schneider	2	0	2
3	99	(United States)	Lauren Kozal	1	0	1
Total				8	1	9

=== Disciplinary record ===
Last updated June 14, 2025

Player				Regular Season			Playoffs			Total		
Rank	No.	Nat.	Name	Yellow card	(yellow card) (yellow-red card)	Red card	Yellow card	(yellow card) (yellow-red card)	Red card	Yellow card	(yellow card) (yellow-red card)	Red card
1	4	(Canada)	Vivianne Bessette	7	0	0	0	0	0	7	0	0
2	12	(England)	Jade Moore	5	0	0	1	0	0	6	0	0
2	15	(United States)	Brooke Hendrix	5	0	0	1	0	0	6	0	0
2	9	(England)	Natasha Flint	4	0	0	2	0	0	6	0	0
5	11	(United States)	Kristen Edmonds	4	0	0	0	0	0	4	0	0
5	19	(United States)	Carlee Giammona	4	0	0	0	0	0	4	0	0
7	5	(Canada)	Jordyn Listro	2	0	1	1	0	0	3	0	1
8	13	(Denmark)	Cecilie Fløe	1	0	0	1	0	0	2	0	0
9	16	(United States)	Siena Bryan	1	0	0	0	0	0	1	0	0
9	24	(United States)	Ashley Clark	1	0	0	0	0	0	1	0	0
9	29	(Iceland)	Andrea Hauksdóttir	1	0	0	0	0	0	1	0	0
9	35	(United States)	Sydny Nasello	1	0	0	0	0	0	1	0	0
9	1	(United States)	Ashley Orkus	1	0	0	0	0	0	1	0	0
9	22	(United States)	Paige Almendariz	1	0	0	0	0	0	1	0	0
9	21	(United States)	Domi Richardson	1	0	0	0	0	0	1	0	0
9	20	(Norway)	Victoria Haugen	1	0	0	0	0	0	1	0	0
Total				41	0	1	6	0	0	47	0	1
