= Iommi (disambiguation) =

Tony Iommi (born 1948) is an English guitarist, songwriter and producer.

Iommi may also refer to:

- Iommi (album), a 2000 album by Tony Iommi featuring various artists

== People with the surname ==
- Enio Iommi (1926–2013), Argentine sculptor
- Jemma Connor-Iommi (born 1985), English-born Irish footballer, related to Tony Iommi
