= Amanda Kowalski (soccer) =

American soccer player (born 1998)

Personal information
- Full name: Amanda Kowalski Fick
- Birth name: Amanda Kowalski
- Date of birth: January 9, 1998 (age 28)
- Height: 5 ft 9 in (1.75 m)
- Position: Defender

Youth career
- Eclipse Select

College career
Years	Team	Apps	(Gls)
2016–2021	Butler Bulldogs	92	(6)

Senior career*
Years	Team	Apps	(Gls)
2022–2023	Chicago Red Stars	19	(3)
2024	Tampa Bay Sun	0	(0)
- * Club domestic league appearances and goals as of June 3, 2025

Amanda Kowalski Fick (née Kowalski; born January 8, 1998) is an American former professional soccer player who played as a defender. She played college soccer for the Butler Bulldogs before spending the majority of her professional career with the Chicago Red Stars of the National Women's Soccer League (NWSL).

== Early life ==
Kowalski grew up in Arlington Heights, Illinois, as one of three children born to Drew and Sue Kowalski. She attended Buffalo Grove High School, where she was a multi-sport athlete. She was a member of the school's 4 × 400 relay record-setting team and also helped Buffalo Grove's basketball team win two regional championships. Kowalski only played on the soccer team as a sophomore before dedicating her time completely to club team Eclipse Select. With Eclipse Select, she won two ECNL National Championships and 4 Midwest Conference Championships. She was also a member of Illinois' ODP team, captaining the squad for one year and also helping the team to a national final appearance in 2014.

== College career ==
Despite joining the Butler Bulldogs in 2016, Kowalski was forced to redshirt her freshman year due to an ACL tear prior to arriving on campus. Upon return, she cemented herself as a key player for the Bulldogs and played in every single one of Butler's matches for the next three seasons. She recorded her first collegiate assist on September 1, 2017, assisting fellow defender Annika Schmidt's game-winner against Eastern Michigan. The following year, Kowalski scored her first college goal, helping Butler defeat Evansville on September 6, 2018. Later on in 2018, she was a contributor in the Bulldogs' Big East Tournament playoff run. She registered an assist in Butler's 3–2 semifinal win over Providence, but the team ended up losing the final to Georgetown.

As a redshirt junior, Kowalski started 16 matches and made 4 assists. In late September, she was also named the Big East Defender of the Week following a strong performance against Seton Hall. Kowalski played two more seasons with Butler, including a fifth year via the NCAA's additional college eligibility afforded to players due to the COVID-19 pandemic. In both campaigns, she earned a conference Defensive Player of the Week honor. Kowalski finished her college career with 92 matches and 6 goals recorded.

== Club career ==
=== Chicago Red Stars ===
Kowalski went undrafted in the 2022 NWSL Draft, but later linked up with the Chicago Red Stars as a preseason trialist. Originally, she signed a national team replacement player contract with the club. However, due to a knee injury to Tierna Davidson, Kowalski was able to sign a permanent, three-year contract on April 4, 2022. She started and played 90 minutes in her professional debut, an NWSL Challenge Cup loss to the Houston Dash. The next match, she scored her first pro goal, helping the Red Stars reach a 1–1 tie with Racing Louisville. She went on to score three more goals across the NWSL season, all of which were headed goals from corner kicks. One of her goals was a stoppage-time header on July 10 that helped Chicago salvage a 2–2 draw against the North Carolina Courage. Kowalski ended up playing in 17 of the Red Stars' 22 matches, starting 12 of them. She also helped the team qualify for the NWSL playoffs, where they were defeated by the San Diego Wave in the quarterfinals. At the end of the season, she was crowned the Red Stars' Rookie of the Year.

In 2023, Kowalski saw her playing time decrease significantly, due in part to the return of several USWNT players to Chicago's backline. She finished the season with 3 appearances across all competitions (1 start). Prior to 2024, the Red Stars released Kowalski from her contract in order to reduce the size of their roster.

=== Tampa Bay Sun ===
On June 11, 2024, Tampa Bay Sun FC signed Kowalski ahead of the inaugural USL Super League season. However, she did not play in any matches or appear on any gameday rosters for Tampa Bay as the team finished in 2nd place and qualified for the playoffs.

== Personal life ==
Kowalski married Zach Fick in December 2023. Kowalski and Fick welcomed their first son, Walker, in January 2026.

== Career statistics ==
=== Club ===
Appearances and goals by club, season and competition
Club	Season	League			Cup (Note: Includes the NWSL Challenge Cup)		Playoffs (Note: Includes NWSL Playoffs and USL Super League Playoffs)		Total	
Club	Season	Division	Apps	Goals	Apps	Goals	Apps	Goals	Apps	Goals
Chicago Red Stars	2022	NWSL	17	3	3	1	0	0	20	4
Chicago Red Stars	2023	NWSL	2	0	1	0	—		3	0
Chicago Red Stars	Total		19	3	4	1	0	0	23	4
Tampa Bay Sun FC	2024–25	USL Super League	0	0	—		0	0	0	0
Career total			19	3	4	1	0	0	23	4
