= Big South Conference women's soccer tournament =

- Conference soccer championship
- Sport: College soccer
- Conference: Big South Conference
- Number of teams: 6
- Format: Single-elimination
- Current stadium: Sportsplex at Matthews
- Current location: Matthews, North Carolina
- Played: 1993–present
- Last contest: 2026
- Current champion: UNC Asheville (3rd title)
- Most championships: Radford (9 titles)
- TV partner(s): ESPN3, ESPN+
- Official website: bigsouthsports.com/wsoc

The Big South Conference women's soccer tournament is the conference championship tournament in soccer for the Big South Conference. The tournament has been held every year since 1993.

The championship is played under a single-elimination format and seeding is based on regular season records. The winner, declared conference champion, receives the conference's automatic bid to the NCAA Division I women's soccer championship.

With 9 titles, Radford has won the most Big South tournaments of all members past and present.

== Champions ==
=== Finals ===
Key

- (1) – Title number
- a.e.t. – Match went to extra time
- p – Match decided by a penalty shootout after extra time
- – Winning team also won regular season

Ed.	Year	Champion	Score	Runner-up	Venue / city	MVP	Ref.
1	1993	Campbell (1)	2–1	UMBC	Retriever Park • Catonsville, Md	Ashley Gruno, Campbell	
2	1994	UNC Greensboro (1)	2–1	Charleston Southern	Retriever Park • Catonsville, Md	Margaret Malloy, UNC Greensboro	
3	1995	UNC Asheville (1)	1–0	UNC Greensboro	UNCG Stadium • Greensboro, NC	Alison Gehringer/Jill Young, UNC Asheville	
4	1996	UNC Greensboro (2)	1–1 (4–3 p)	UNC Asheville	UNCG Stadium • Greensboro, NC	Raila Maisonlahti, UNC Greensboro	
5	1997	South Alabama (1)	2–1	UMBC	Cupp Stadium • Radford, Virginia	Leah Bridges, South Alabama	
6	1998	Radford (1)	1–0	UNC Asheville	Osborne Stadium • Lynchburg, Va	Stephanie Rico, Radford	
7	1999	Elon (1)	3–2 (a.e.t.)	Liberty	Osborne Stadium • Lynchburg, Va	Erin Morse, Elon	
8	2000	Liberty (1)	2–1	Elon	Cupp Stadium • Radford, Virginia	Nancy Davis, Liberty	
9	2001	Liberty (2)	2–0	Elon	Blackbaud Stadium • Charleston, SC	Jenny Davis, Liberty	
10	2002	Radford (2)	2–0	UNC Asheville	Blackbaud Stadium • Charleston, SC	Kelly Bertwell, Radford	
11	2003	High Point (1)	0–0 (3–2 p)	UNC Asheville	Vert Stadium • High Point, NC	Stephanie Moenter, High Point	
12	2004	Birmingham–Southern (1)	0–0 (5–3 p)	High Point	Blackbaud Stadium • Charleston, SC	Sharmaine Samules, Birmingham–Southern	
13	2005	Liberty (3)	3–0	UNC Asheville	Eagle Field • Rock Hill, SC	Rachel Bendzolwicz, Liberty	
14	2006	UNC Asheville (2)	0–0 (4–2 p)	Liberty	CCU Stadium • Conway, SC	Ashleigh Carter, UNC Asheville	
15	2007	High Point (2)	0–0 (5–3 p)	Coastal Carolina	Blackbaud Stadium • Charleston, SC	Sara Rager, High Point	
16	2008	Radford (3)	2–1	Coastal Carolina	Vert Stadium • High Point, NC	Caitlyn Roan, Radford	
17	2009	High Point (3)	0–0 (4–2 p)	Winthrop	Blackbaud Stadium • Charleston, SC	Marisa Abbott, High Point	
18	2010	High Point (4)	1–0 (a.e.t.)	Gardner–Webb	Osborne Stadium • Lynchburg, Va	Janay Whittaker, High Point	
19	2011	Radford (4)	1–0	Campbell	Blackbaud Stadium • Charleston, SC	Sahar Aflaki, Radford	
20	2012	Radford (5)	1–0	Wintrhop	Eagle Field • Rock Hill, SC	Che' Brown, Radford	
21	2013	Liberty (4)	5–0	Radford	CCU Soccer Stadium • Conway, SC	Brittany Aanderud, Liberty	
22	2014	High Point (5)	2–2 (5–4 p)	Liberty	Bryan Park • Greensboro, NC	Jacky Kessler, High Point	
23	2015	Liberty (5)	1–0	Campbell	Bryan Park • Greensboro, NC	Alex Mack, Liberty	
24	2016	Liberty (6)	2–1 (a.e.t.)	High Point	Bryan Park • Greensboro, NC	Jennifer Knoebel, Liberty	
25	2017	High Point (6)	1–0	Longwood	Bryan Park • Greensboro, NC	Alex Hank, High Point	
26	2018	Radford (6)	1–0	Gardner–Webb	Sportsplex • Matthews, NC	Jasmine Casarez, Radford	
27	2019	Radford (7)	1–0	Gardner–Webb	Sportsplex • Matthews, NC	Nelia Perez, Radford	
28	2020	Campbell (2)	4–3	High Point	Vert Stadium • High Point, NC	Elyssa Nowowieski, Campbell	
29	2021	High Point (7)	2–1 (a.e.t.)	Campbell	Eakes Complex • Buies Creek, NC	Skyler Prillaman, High Point	
30	2022	Radford (8)	3–0	Gardner-Webb	Sportsplex • Matthews, NC	Helena Willson, Radford	
31	2023	Radford (9)	2–1	USC Upstate	Sportsplex • Matthews, NC	Lilly Short, Radford	
32	2024	USC Upstate (1)	3–0	High Point	Sportsplex • Matthews, NC	Catarina Dantas, USC Upstate	
33	2025	High Point (8)	1–1 (7–8 p)	USC Upstate	Sportsplex • Matthews, NC	Aubrey McKessy, High Point	
34	2026	UNC Asheville (3)	2–1	Radford	Greenwood Field • Asheville, NC	Georgia Duke, UNC Asheville	

=== By school ===
As of 2026 Tournament

School	W	L	T	Pct.	Finals	Titles	Title years
Birmingham–Southern	3	3	1	.500	1	1	2004
Campbell	14	9	2	.600	5	2	1993, 2020
Charleston Southern	7	25	7	.269	1	0	—
Coastal Carolina	7	11	5	.413	2	0	—
Elon	2	2	4	.500	3	1	1999
High Point	32	16	8	.632	12	8	2003, 2007, 2009, 2010, 2014, 2017, 2021, 2025
Howard	0	2	0	.000	0	0	—
Gardner–Webb	5	11	4	.350	4	0	—
Liberty	27	9	7	.709	9	6	2000, 2001, 2005, 2013, 2015, 2016
Longwood	4	9	4	.353	1	0	—
Presbyterian	0	3	1	.125	0	0	—
Radford	33	20	6	.610	11	9	1998, 2002, 2008, 2011, 2012, 2018, 2019, 2022, 2023
South Alabama	2	1	0	.667	1	1	1997
Towson State	0	2	0	.000	0	0	—
VMI	1	3	2	.333	0	0	—
UMBC	5	5	1	.500	2	0	—
UNC Asheville	14	14	9	.500	8	3	1995, 2006, 2026
UNC Greensboro	3	2	2	.571	3	2	1994, 1996
USC Upstate	4	4	2	.500	3	1	2024
Winthrop	4	15	6	.280	2	0	—

Teams in italics no longer sponsor women's soccer in the Big South.
