= Emily Thomson (footballer) =

Scottish footballer (born 1993)

Personal information
- Full name: Emily Thomson
- Date of birth: 12 August 1993 (age 33)
- Place of birth: Motherwell, Scotland
- Position: Winger

Youth career
- Lanarkshire United
- Motherwell Girls FC

Senior career*
Years	Team	Apps	(Gls)
2009–2011	Arsenal	0	(0)
2011–2013	Celtic	28	(10)
2013	Glasgow City	3	(1)

International career
2012	Scotland	5	(1)
- * Club domestic league appearances and goals

Emily Thomson (born 12 August 1993) is a Scottish football winger. She has represented the Scotland women's national football team at youth and senior level.

== Club career ==
In 2009 Thomson left Motherwell Girls and signed a two-year contract to join the academy of English champions Arsenal Ladies. She returned to Scotland to join Celtic in 2011 before moving to Glasgow City in June 2013.

== International career ==
While a 14–year–old pupil at Dalziel High School, Thomson scored winning goals for Scotland at Under–17 level against Republic of Ireland and Norway at a tournament in France. The vice–captain of the national Under 19 team, Thomson made her first senior appearance for Scotland in May 2012; a 3–1 friendly win over Poland in Gdańsk.

Thomson attended the Scottish Football Association National Performance Centre at the University of Stirling.

=== International goals ===
Results list Scotland's goal tally first.

#	Date	Venue	Opponent	Result	Competition	Scored
1	1 June 2013	Laugardalsvöllur, Reykjavík	Iceland	3–2	Friendly	1
