= Brooke Hendrix =

American soccer player (born 1993)

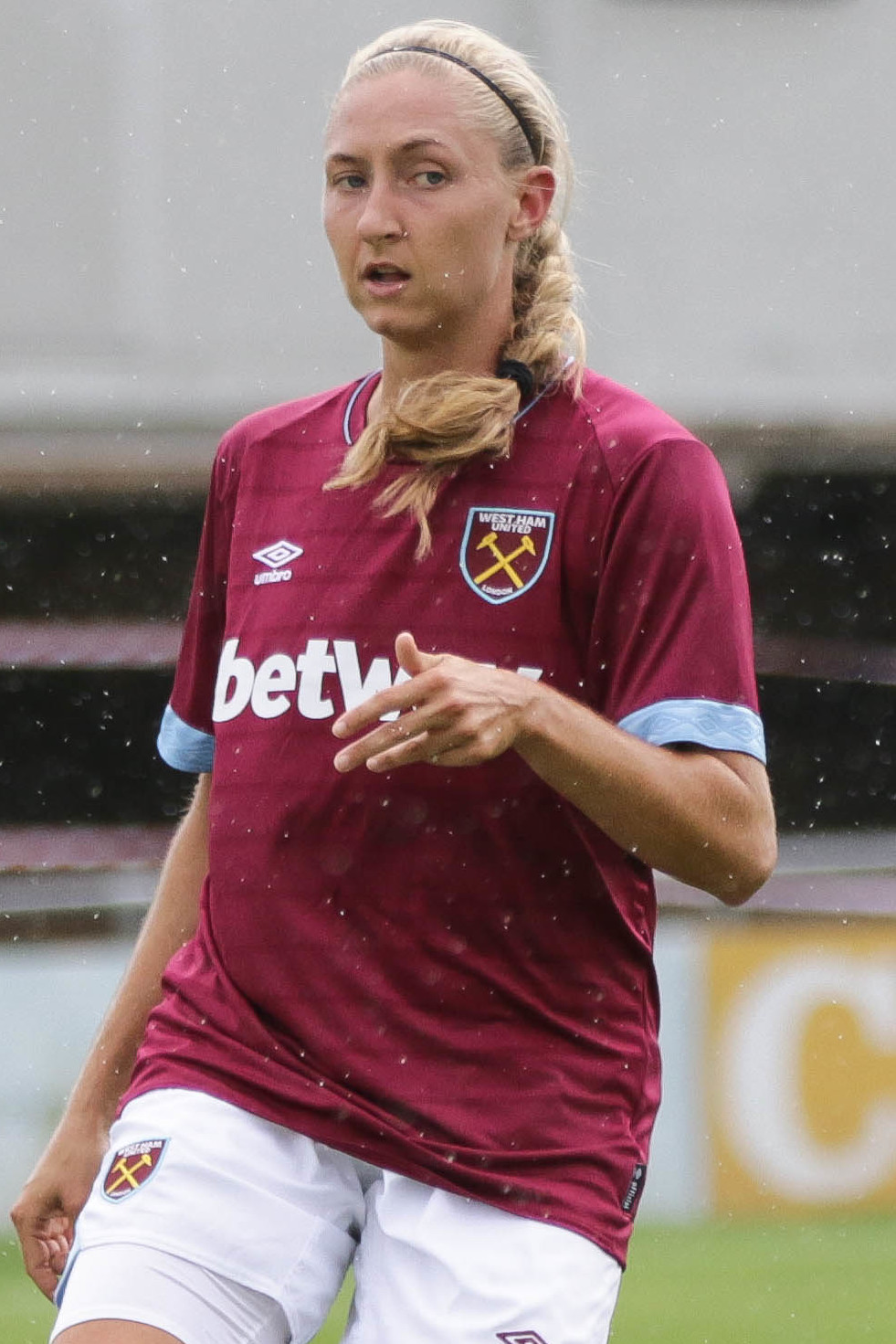
- Hendrix with West Ham United in 2018

Personal information
- Full name: Brooke Tatum Hendrix
- Date of birth: May 6, 1993 (age 33)
- Place of birth: Sharpsburg, Georgia, United States
- Height: 1.81 m (5 ft 11 in)
- Positions: Centre back; defensive midfielder

Team information
- Current team: Tampa Bay Sun
- Number: 15

Youth career
- 2007–2010: Northgate Vikings
- 2008–2009: Alpharetta United

College career
Years	Team	Apps	(Gls)
2011–2014	Southern Miss Golden Eagles	71	(7)

Senior career*
Years	Team	Apps	(Gls)
2016	Atlanta Silverbacks		
2016	Rangers		
2016–2017	FC Staad	7	(1)
2017	Fylkir	6	(1)
2017–2018	Brescia	23	(0)
2018–2019	West Ham United	21	(0)
2020	Washington Spirit	4	(0)
2021	Racing Louisville	7	(0)
2022	Melbourne Victory	11	(1)
2022–2024	Reading	26	(1)
2024–	Tampa Bay Sun	63	(1)
- * Club domestic league appearances and goals as of 00:52, November 7, 2026 (UTC)

Brooke Tatum Hendrix (born May 6, 1993) is an American soccer player who plays as a defender for Tampa Bay Sun in the USL Super League.

== College career ==
Hendrix played college soccer at Southern Miss from 2011 to 2014.

== Club career ==
=== Early career ===
In 2016 Hendrix attended trials in the Netherlands with SC Heerenveen and AFC Ajax, but was not contracted by either team. Instead she played in the summer season with Atlanta Silverbacks and ended 2016 in Scotland with Glasgow Rangers. Keen to keep playing when the Scottish season ended, she signed for Swiss club FC Staad in January 2017.

Hendrix represented Fylkir in the 2017 Úrvalsdeild, then joined Brescia ahead of the 2017–18 Serie A season. With the Biancoazzurre she was a runner-up in the league and the cup and played in the UEFA Champions League. She signed for English FA WSL club West Ham in July 2018.

=== Washington Spirit ===
On January 2, 2020, Hendrix returned back to the US, signing with the Washington Spirit. She was waived by the club on December 21, 2020.

=== Racing Louisville ===
Hendrix was picked up by Racing Louisville on December 30, 2020.

=== Melbourne Victory ===
In February 2022 Hendrix signed for reigning A-League Women Champions Melbourne Victory. Hendrix arrival at the Victory signalled a turnaround in their fortunes. She scored on debut in a 1–0 over the Newcastle Jets and dramatically changed a leaky defence. Prior to the Grand Final, Victory lost just two of eight games since her arrival, conceding 0.9 goals per game as opposed to the average of 2.2 goals per game conceded in the six games prior. Victory were crowned Women's A-League Champions on March 27, 2022, after beating Sydney FC in the Grand Final.

=== Reading ===
On 21 July 2022, Reading announced the signing of Hendrix from Melbourne Victory on a two-year contract. On 2 February 2024, Hendrix was appointed as club captain of Reading following the departure of Lily Woodham.

=== Tampa Bay Sun ===
On June 17, 2024, it was announced that Hendrix had signed with Tampa Bay Sun ahead of the inaugural USL Super League season. Hendrix scored Tampa Bay's first-ever goal in a 1–1 draw against Dallas Trinity on August 18, 2024.

== Career statistics ==
As of match played November 1, 2026

Appearances and goals by club, season and competition
Club	Season	League			National Cup		League Cup		Continental		Total	
Club	Season	Division	Apps	Goals	Apps	Goals	Apps	Goals	Apps	Goals	Apps	Goals
Fylkir	2017	Úrvalsdeild kvenna	6	1	—		—		—		6	1
Brescia	2017–18	Serie A Femminile	23	0	—		—		4	0	27	0
West Ham United	2018–19	FA Women's Super League	14	0	—		5	0	—		19	0
West Ham United	2019–20	FA Women's Super League	7	0	—		5	0	—		12	0
Washington Spirit	2020	NWSL	4	0	—		1	0	—		5	0
Racing Louisville	2021	NWSL	7	0	—		4	1	—		11	1
Melbourne Victory	2021–22	A-League Women	11	1	—		—		—		11	1
Reading	2022–23	FA Women's Super League	7	0	1	0	1	0	—		9	0
Reading	2023–24	Women's Championship	19	1	2	0	4	0	—		25	1
Tampa Bay Sun FC	2024–25	USL Super League	13	1	—		—		—		13	1
Tampa Bay Sun FC	2025–26	USL Super League	17	0	—		—		—		17	0
Tampa Bay Sun FC	2026	USL Super League	8	0	—		—		—		8	0
Career total			140	4	3	0	20	1	4	0	163	5

== Honors ==
Tampa Bay Sun

- USL Super League: 2024–25
