= Kyriaki Kynossidou =

Greek footballer

Personal information
- Date of birth: 31 August 1988 (age 38)
- Position: Defender

Senior career*
Years	Team	Apps	(Gls)
2006–2013	PAOK		
2013–2022	Apollon		

International career^{‡}
	Greece U19	12	(0)
2019–2020	Greece	12	(0)
- * Club domestic league appearances and goals ‡ National team caps and goals as of 5 March 2020

Kyriaki Kynossidou (born 31 August 1988) is a Greek former footballer who played as a defender for Cypriot First Division club Apollon Ladies FC and the Greece women's national team.
