= London Bees =

English women's football club

- Full name: London Bees
- Nickname: The Bees
- Founded: 1975; 51 years ago (as District Line Ladies F.C.)
- Ground: The Hive Stadium, Canons Park
- Capacity: 1,000
- Chairman: Anthony Kleanthous
- Manager: Daniel McKimm
- League: FA Women's National League Division One South East
- 2025–26: FA Women's National League Division One South East, 4th of 12
- Website: https://www.londonbeesfc.com/
Home colours	Away colours

London Bees is an English women's football club affiliated with Barnet F.C. They play in the FA Women's National League Division One South East, the fourth tier of the English women's football pyramid. The club has been in existence under several names since 1975, originally being called District Line Ladies F.C. The team were re-branded as London Bees after joining the new WSL 2 for the 2014 season. The club have a first team and a youth academy; both train and play at the Hive Stadium.

== History ==
The club began in 1975 as District Line Ladies FC, then merged with Wembley FC in 1993 to become Wembley Ladies FC. In 1996 Wembley won the League Cup by defeating Doncaster Belles. In 1997 Wembley reached the FA Women's Cup final after defeating Arsenal in the semi-final. However they were unable to beat Millwall Lionesses and lost 1-0 at the Boleyn Ground. In 1997 the club moved to play at Hanwell Town FC but kept the Wembley Ladies name. In 1998, the club became affiliated with Barnet FC, amalgamating with the existing Barnet Ladies FC from the Greater London League to form Barnet FC Ladies.

In March 2010 Barnet F.C. Ladies were announced as an unsuccessful bidder for the FA Women's Super League. In 2013, they were successful in their bid to join the WSL under their new name of London Bees for the 2014 season.

In the 2016 FA WSL summer season, London Bees became the first WSL 2 club to reach the semi-finals of the FA WSL Cup, after notable wins against Chelsea Ladies on penalties and Sheffield Ladies in their quarter-final fixture. They were later defeated in the semi-final by Birmingham City Ladies.

In the 2020–21 season, London Bees finished bottom of the Championship and were relegated to the third tier of English women's football.

In the 2024–2025 season, London Bees finished fourth in the FA Women's National League Division One South East, the fourth tier of English women's football.

== Current squad ==
As of 27 August 2025

Note: Flags indicate national team as defined under FIFA eligibility rules; some limited exceptions apply. Players may hold more than one non-FIFA nationality.

No.	Pos.	Nation	Player
1	GK	ENG	Tia Ginn
2	DF	LBN	Mira Hoitet
3	DF	ENG	Aria Heil
4	MF	ENG	Olivia Clement
5	DF	ENG	Cheyenne Flynn
6	DF	ENG	Ryah Vyse
7	MF	ENG	Sandra Martins
8	MF	ENG	Aimee Durn
9	MF	ENG	Millie Isherwood
10	FW	ENG	Sam Lanza
11	MF	ENG	Megan Garbutt

No.	Pos.	Nation	Player
17	GK	ENG	Emma Roberts
16	MF	ENG	Brionne Fowle
18	MF		Fran Vigo (on loan from Watford)
19	FW	ENG	Betty Larkin
20	DF	ENG	Rebekah Wozniak
21	DF	ENG	Sophie Davidson
22	MF	ENG	Shamoy Campbell
23	MF		Layla Kenly
25	DF		Destiny Rosier-Welsh
27	MF		Lily Whitelock (on loan from Watford)
28	MF		Isla Callison

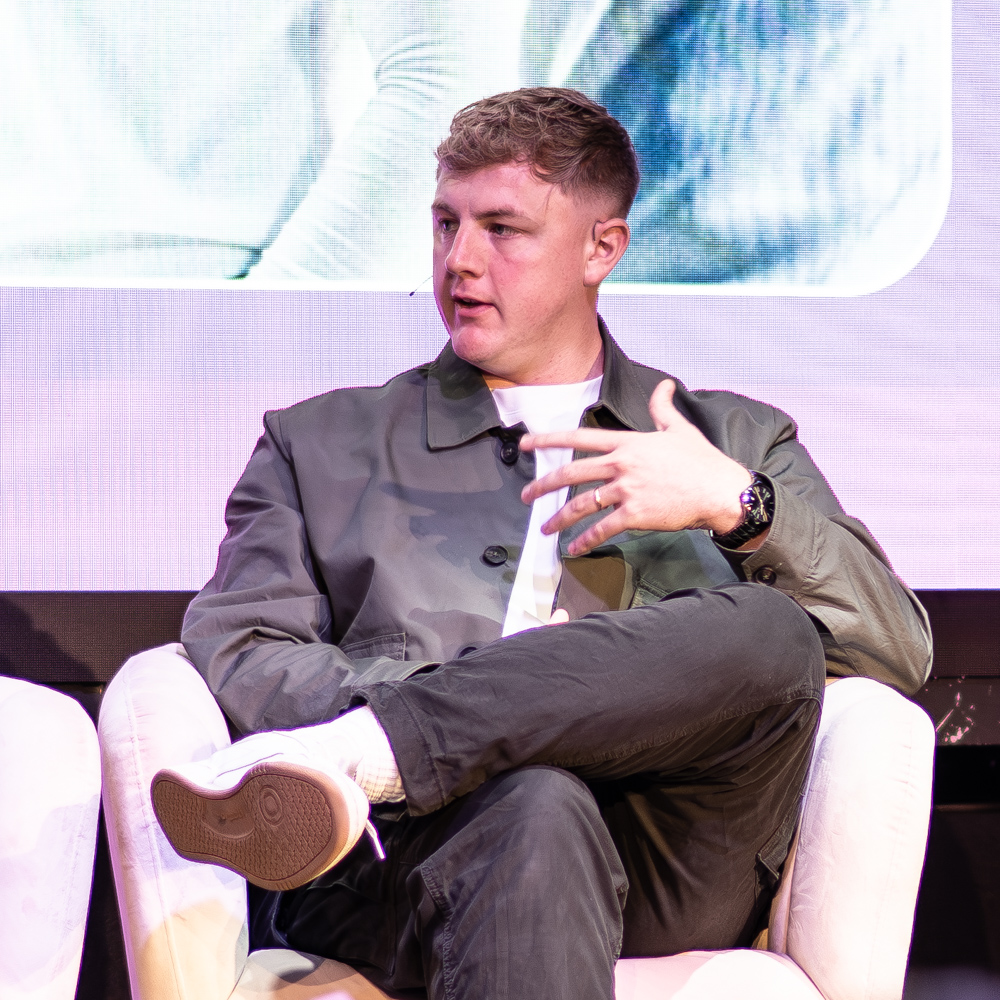
Dan McKimm at the 2025 SXSW London festival in London, England.

== Current technical staff ==
As of 27th August, 2025.

Position	Name
First Team Coach	Dan McKimm
Goalkeeping Coach	James McKimm
Assistant Coach	Tim Abramyan
S & C Coach	Harry Garrod
Physiotherapist	Ali Jaweed
Nutritionist	Georgia Ridgeway
Sports Psychologist	Kate Chesser
Media & Communications	Alfie-Bray Cracknell

== Notable former players ==
Players who played for District Line Ladies, Wembley Ladies, Barnet FC Ladies or London Bees and received recognition at full international level

- (Bulgaria) Evdokia Popadinova
- (England) Natasha Dowie
- (England) Carol Harwood
- (England) Lesley Higgs
- (England) Kim Jerray-Silver
- (England) Justine Lorton
- (England) Kristy Moore
- (England) Danielle Murphy
- (England) Sarah Reed
- (England) Kelly Smith
- (Republic of Ireland) Emma Beckett
- (Republic of Ireland) Jemma Connor-Iommi
- (Republic of Ireland) Jan Mooney
- (Israel) Ayala Liran
- (Wales) Naz Ball
- (Wales) Eleri Earnshaw
- (Wales) Sydney Hinchcliffe
- (Wales) Danielle Oates
- (Wales) Sally Wade
- (Wales) Laura-May Walkley
- (Republic of Ireland) Ruesha Littlejohn
- (England) Rachel Unitt
- (Wales) Charlie Estcourt
- (Wales) Helen Ward

== Former managers ==
Manager	Dates
Lee Burch	May 2019 – February 2021
Rachel Yankey	February 2019 – May 2019
Luke Swindlehurst	July 2017 – February 2019
David Edmonson	February 2016 – May 2017
Julian Broomes	August 2014 – October 2015

== Honours ==
- FA Women's Premier League Southern Division:
  - Winners (2): 1992–93 (as District Line), 2009–10 (as Barnet F.C. Ladies)
- FA Women's Premier League Cup:
  - Winners (2): 1995–96 (as Wembley Ladies)

, 2010–11

- FA WSL Cup:
  - Semi-Finalist: 2016, Continental Cup

== Player honours ==
- FA WSL 2 Golden Boot Award
  - Winner: Jo Wilson with 10 League goals in 2016
- FA WSL 2 Player of the Month (April 2017/18)
  - Winner: Katie Wilkinson
- FA Championship Player of the Month (January 2019/20)
  - Winner: Sarah Quantrill

== Manager honours ==
- LMA Women's Championship Manager of the Month (September 2019/20)
  - Winner: Lee Burch
- LMA Women's Championship Manager of the Month (January 2019/20)
  - Winner: Lee Burch
