= Erin Vaughan =

Welsh footballer

Personal information
- Full name: Erin Louise Vaughan
- Date of birth: 15 February 1986 (age 40)
- Place of birth: Newport, Wales
- Position: Defender

Senior career*
Years	Team	Apps	(Gls)
2003–2005	Shrewsbury Town WFC		
2005–2014	Aston Villa LFC		

International career^{‡}
2006–2013	Wales	19	(1)
- * Club domestic league appearances and goals as of 13:23, 15 December 2022 (UTC) ‡ National team caps and goals as of 13:23, 15 December 2022 (UTC)

Erin Louise Vaughan (born 15th February 1986) is a Welsh football coach and former player. She was a defender for Aston Villa and the Wales women's national football team. She is the daughter of former Wales international footballer Nigel Vaughan. She spent years as a coach at ISC Gunners FC and now serves as the Girls Director for Eastside West Football Club.

== Club career ==
Vaughan helped Shrewsbury Town win the Shropshire County Cup in 2005.

She then joined Aston Villa Ladies for season 2005 – 06. During the 2012 off-season, Vaughan played in the American Women's Premier Soccer League (WPSL) for Issaquah SC.

When Aston Villa successfully bid for inclusion in the new FA WSL 2 in 2014, Vaughan remained an important part of the team.

== International career ==
Vaughan represented Wales at U19 level, winning five caps. Her full debut was on 15th March 2006, in a 3–2 friendly defeat in Switzerland.
