= Jade Moore =

English footballer (born 1990)

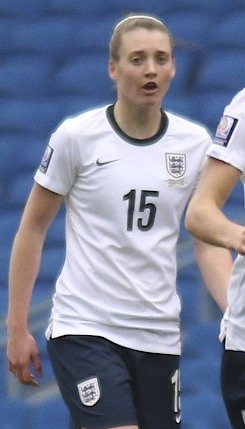
- Moore playing for England in 2014

Personal information
- Full name: Jade Ellis Moore
- Date of birth: 22 October 1990 (age 36)
- Place of birth: Worksop, England
- Height: 5 ft 5 in (1.66 m)
- Position: Midfielder

Youth career
- Doncaster Rovers Belles

Senior career*
Years	Team	Apps	(Gls)
2005–2007	Lincoln City	39	(6)
2007–2010	Leeds United	53	(6)
2011–2016	Birmingham City	62	(3)
2016–2017	Notts County	8	(0)
2017–2020	Reading	47	(8)
2020–2021	Orlando Pride	0	(0)
2020	→ Atlético Madrid (loan)	10	(0)
2022–2023	Manchester United	6	(0)
2023	→ Reading (loan)	9	(0)
2023–2024	Birmingham City	18	(2)
2024–2025	Tampa Bay Sun	24	(1)

International career^{‡}
2008–2009	England U19	14	(5)
2010	England U20	3	(0)
2010–2011	England U23	4	(0)
2012–2019	England	50	(1)
Medal record
Women's football
Representing England
FIFA Women's World Cup
Bronze medal – third place	2015 Canada
- * Club domestic league appearances and goals as of 30 June 2025 ‡ National team caps and goals as of 25 January 2025

Jade Ellis Moore (born 22 October 1990) is an English former footballer who played as a midfielder.

She has previously played in England for Manchester United, Reading, Notts County, Birmingham City, Leeds United and Lincoln City, for Orlando Pride in the National Women's Soccer League, and Atlético Madrid in the Spanish Primera División. Moore represented England at junior levels and made her debut for the senior national team in 2012. She represented her country at UEFA Women's Euro 2013 and both the 2015 and 2019 FIFA Women's World Cup, winning a bronze medal in 2015.

== Club career ==
Moore joined Lincoln City from Doncaster Rovers Belles in 2005. In 2007 Moore signed for Leeds United and played in that season's FA Women's Cup final defeat to Arsenal. She also started a 3–1 Premier League Cup final win over Everton on 11 February 2010, to help Leeds win their first major silverware. In December 2010, Moore was revealed to have signed for Birmingham City's FA WSL squad.

Moore started against Chelsea in the 2012 FA Women's Cup Final, which Birmingham eventually won after a penalty shootout. In June 2016, Moore and teammate Jo Potter both bought out the last six months of their Birmingham City contracts and left the club as free agents. Despite the players' long service, a statement on Birmingham City Ladies' website called the development "an excellent deal for the club".

Later that month Moore and Potter joined Notts County on short term deals until the end of the 2016 FA WSL season. Less than a year later, however, the club folded before the 2017 FA WSL Spring Series. Becoming a free agent, Moore joined Reading along with teammates Jo Potter and Kirsty Linnett in May 2017.

On 1 April 2020, Moore signed for Orlando Pride in the NWSL, the first time she had signed outside of England. The season was postponed due to the coronavirus pandemic with the NWSL eventually scheduling a smaller schedule 2020 NWSL Challenge Cup tournament. However, on 22 June 2020, the team withdrew from the tournament following positive COVID-19 tests among both players and staff.

On 18 August 2020, having been unable to feature for Orlando Pride, Moore joined Spanish Primera División team Atlético Madrid on loan until February 2021. She made her Atléti debut on 21 August, starting in a Champions League quarter-final defeat to Barcelona during the restart of the 2019–20 UEFA Women's Champions League. Her loan was terminated on 20 December 2020.

Moore made her Orlando Pride debut on 10 April 2021, 12 months after first signing with the club, against Racing Louisville FC during the 2021 NWSL Challenge Cup tournament. She started all four games during the Challenge Cup before suffering a knee injury prior to the start of the regular season which kept her out for the rest of the year. She was extended a contract offer to return in 2022 but did not sign.

On 27 January 2022, Moore returned to England to sign with Manchester United, now coached by Marc Skinner who had signed Moore for Orlando Pride and who she had previously worked with at Birmingham City.

On 28 January 2023, Moore rejoined Reading on loan for the remainder of the 2022–23 season. She departed United at the end of her contract on 30 June 2023.

On 25 August 2023, she signed for Birmingham City on a one-year contract.

Moore joined the Tampa Bay Sun on 26 June 2024, ahead of the inaugural USL Super League season. Moore retired in 2025, following the 2024–25 USL Super League season that saw Sun FC capture the first-ever league championship.

== International career ==
A 15-year-old Moore made her debut for England Under-17s. She has since represented England at Under-19, Under-20 and Under-23 levels. Moore played in the FIFA U-20 Women's World Cup in both 2008 and 2010.

Moore also featured in England's 2009 UEFA Women's Under-19 Championship final win, against Sweden in Belarus. She received her first call up to the senior squad in October 2011, ahead of a UEFA Women's Euro 2013 qualifying tie against the Netherlands. Moore won her first senior international cap in February 2012, playing 90 minutes of England's 3–1 Cyprus Cup win over Finland. On the occasion of her third cap, Moore scored against Italy as England were beaten 3–1 in the competition's third place play–off.

National coach Hope Powell picked Moore in her squad for UEFA Women's Euro 2013, but she remained an unused substitute in all three matches as England crashed out in the first round. When Mark Sampson replaced Powell as England coach, he named Moore in his first squad in December 2013. In May 2015, Sampson named Moore in his final squad for the 2015 FIFA Women's World Cup, where the team finished third. Moore was named to her third consecutive major tournament finals squad when Sampson selected her to his UEFA Women's Euro 2017 squad in April 2017.

In May 2019, Moore was called up to the 2019 FIFA Women's World Cup squad. She played in four games including two starts against Argentina in the group stage and Sweden in the third-place playoff as England finished fourth.

Moore was allotted 178 when the FA announced their legacy numbers scheme to honour the 50th anniversary of England’s inaugural international. In total she received 50 caps for England and scored 1 goal.

== Personal life ==
Moore was a student at Leeds Metropolitan University. As a 16-year-old, she had won a Football Association scholarship to Loughborough University, where a routine screening revealed two holes in her heart. Moore was able to resume training two weeks after surgery. After graduating from university in 2013, Moore set up her own sports therapy business.

== Career statistics ==
=== Club ===
As of match played 9 February 2025.

Appearances and goals by club, season and competition
Club	Season	League			National cup (Note: Includes the FA Cup and Copa de la Reina, NWSL Challenge Cup)		League cup (Note: Includes the FA Women's Premier League Cup and WSL Cup/League Cup)		Continental (Note: Includes the UEFA Champions League)		Total	
Club	Season	Division	Apps	Goals	Apps	Goals	Apps	Goals	Apps	Goals	Apps	Goals
Lincoln	2005–06	WPL Northern	20	1	0	0	0	0	—		20	1
Lincoln	2006–07	WPL Northern	19	5	0	0	2	0	—		21	5
Lincoln	Total		39	6	0	0	2	0	0	0	41	6
Leeds United	2007–08	WPL National	15	2	0	0	1	0	—		16	2
Leeds United	2008–09	WPL National	16	3	0	0	2	0	—		18	3
Leeds United	2009–10	WPL National	22	1	0	0	4	1	—		26	2
Leeds United	Total		53	6	0	0	7	1	0	0	60	7
Birmingham City	2011	FA WSL	11	0	0	0	3	0	—		14	0
Birmingham City	2012	FA WSL	13	2	4	0	5	1	2	0	24	3
Birmingham City	2013	FA WSL	13	1	2	0	3	0	4	0	22	1
Birmingham City	2014	FA WSL	11	0	2	0	3	1	4	0	20	1
Birmingham City	2015	FA WSL	8	0	2	1	1	0	—		11	1
Birmingham City	2016	FA WSL	6	0	0	0	0	0	—		6	0
Birmingham City	Total		62	3	10	1	15	2	10	0	97	6
Notts County	2016	FA WSL	8	0	0	0	2	0	—		10	0
Reading	2017	FA WSL	6	1	—		—		—		6	1
Reading	2017–18	FA WSL	14	2	0	0	0	0	—		14	2
Reading	2018–19	FA WSL	13	1	2	0	1	0	—		16	1
Reading	2019–20	FA WSL	14	4	1	0	6	0	—		21	4
Reading	Total		47	8	3	0	7	0	0	0	57	8
Orlando Pride	2020	NWSL	0	0	—		—		—		0	0
Orlando Pride	2021	NWSL	0	0	4	0	—		—		4	0
Orlando Pride	Total		0	0	4	0	0	0	0	0	4	0
Atlético Madrid (loan)	2019–20	Primera División	0	0	0	0	—		1	0	1	0
Atlético Madrid (loan)	2020–21	Primera División	10	0	0	0	—		1	0	11	0
Atlético Madrid (loan)	Total		10	0	0	0	0	0	2	0	12	0
Manchester United	2021–22	WSL	3	0	0	0	0	0	—		3	0
Manchester United	2022–23	WSL	3	0	0	0	3	2	—		6	2
Manchester United	Total		6	0	0	0	3	2	0	0	9	2
Reading (loan)	2022–23	WSL	9	0	3	0	0	0	—		12	0
Reading (loan)	Total		9	0	3	0	0	0	0	0	12	0
Birmingham City	2023–24	WOC	18	2	3	0	0	0	0	0	21	2
Birmingham City	Total		18	2	3	0	0	0	0	0	21	2
Tampa Bay Sun FC	2024–25	USL Super League	8	0	—		—		—		8	0
Tampa Bay Sun FC	Total		8	0	0	0	0	0	0	0	8	0
Career total			260	25	23	1	36	5	12	0	331	31

=== International goals ===
England score listed first, score column indicates score after each Moore goal.

No.	Cap	Date	Venue	Opponent	Score	Result	Competition
1	3	6 March 2012	Paralimni Stadium, Paralimni, Cyprus	Italy	1–0	1–3	2012 Cyprus Cup

== Honours ==
=== Club ===
Leeds United

- FA Women's Premier League Cup: 2010

Birmingham City

- FA Cup: 2012

Tampa Bay Sun

- USL Super League: 2024–25

=== International ===
England

- FIFA Women's World Cup third place: 2015
