= Sharla Passariello =

Welsh footballer (born 1992)

Personal information
- Full name: Sharla Louise Passariello
- Date of birth: 14 January 1992 (age 34)
- Place of birth: Abergavenny, Wales
- Height: 5 ft 5 in (1.65 m)
- Position: Striker

Team information
- Current team: Selfoss

Youth career
- Mardy FC
- Filton College Football Academy

College career
Years	Team	Apps	(Gls)
2010–2013	South Florida Bulls		

Senior career*
Years	Team	Apps	(Gls)
2007–2010	Bristol Academy		
2015–2016	Bristol Academy		
2016–2017	UMF Selfoss		

International career^{‡}
2009–	Wales	4	(0)
- * Club domestic league appearances and goals ‡ National team caps and goals as of 1 October 2010

Sharla Louise Passariello (born 14 January 1992) is a footballer who plays for the Welsh national team and UMF Selfoss. Passariello plays as a striker and came through the youth system at Bristol Academy.

== Club career ==
Passariello played for Mardy FC while attending King Henry VIII School Abergavenny. She then helped Filton College win seven national titles and also featured for the Bristol Academy senior team in the FA Women's Premier League National Division.

She won a scholarship to the University of South Florida in 2010. In 2015 Passariello was resigned by Bristol. In 2016, Passariello signed for UMF Selfoss for the second half of the season, competing in the Icelandic Women's Pepsi League.

== International career ==
Passariello played for Wales U17s aged just 14 and also became a regular with the U19s. She made her senior debut, aged 17, in a 3–0 win over Slovenia in August 2009.
