= Emma Beckett (footballer) =

Irish association football player

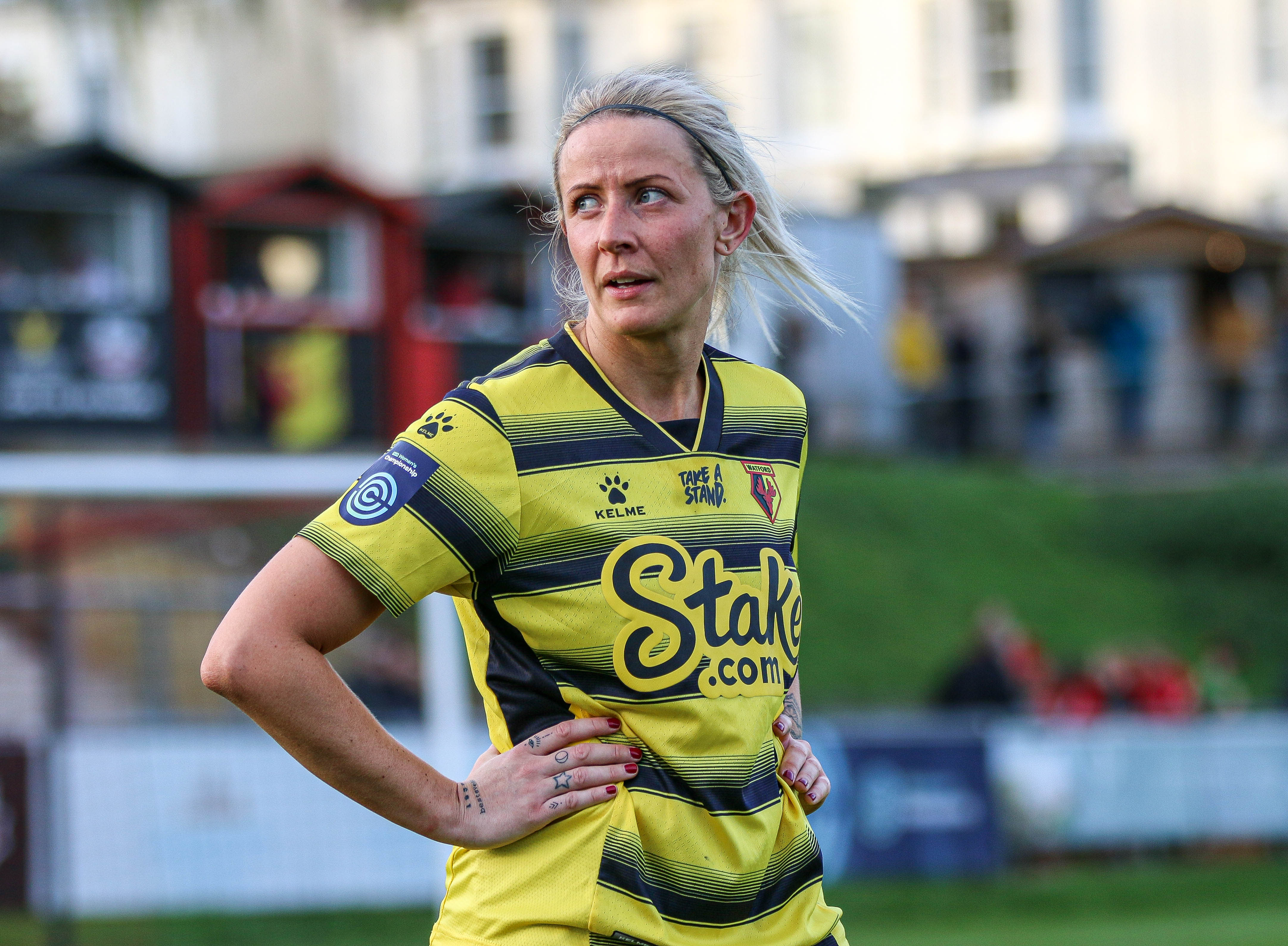
- Playing for Watford in 2021

Personal information
- Full name: Emma Louise Beckett
- Date of birth: 29 May 1987 (age 39)
- Place of birth: Northampton, England
- Position: Midfielder

Senior career*
Years	Team	Apps	(Gls)
- Northampton Town
2007–2009	Watford		
2009	Fulham		
2009–2011	Millwall Lionesses		
2011–2012	Charlton Athletic		
2012–2014	Watford		
2015	Amazon Grimstad	20	(1)
2016–2019	London Bees	29	(5)
2019	Tottenham Hotspur	8	(1)
2019–2022	Watford	9	(1)

International career^{‡}
2015–2016	Republic of Ireland	4	(0)
- * Club domestic league appearances and goals as of 10 November 2019 ‡ National team caps and goals as of 23 February 2019

Emma Louise Beckett (born 29 May 1987) is an Irish football midfielder who played for Watford and the Ireland national team.

== Club career ==
With her hometown club Northampton Town, Beckett was part of a treble-winning team in 2004–05. Beckett later became a journeywoman, playing for several FA Women's Premier League teams in Greater London. In 2015, after accepting an offer to join Amazon Grimstad of the Norwegian Toppserien, Beckett quipped that she had "more clubs than Tiger Woods". She left London Bees, where she had been the captain, to join Tottenham Hotspur in January 2019. Later that year Spurs took on seven new players and eleven players were not included. These players including Beckett, Sarah Wiltshire and top scorer Bianca Baptiste had to find new roles.

== International career ==
Although born and raised in England, Beckett was eligible to play for Ireland or Northern Ireland as her parents came from Roscommon and Cork.

On 5 May 2014, Republic of Ireland women's national football team manager Susan Ronan named Beckett in an experimental squad for a friendly against the Basque Country. Beckett started the game in Ireland's 2–0 defeat in Azpeitia, which was not classified as a full international fixture.

Beckett retained her place in the national team for a January 2015 training camp in La Manga, Spain. She was a half-time substitute for Louise Quinn in a 3–1 training match defeat by Norway at La Manga Stadium. She also played against Slovakia at the 2015 Istria Cup, after a groin injury kept her out of Ireland's opening match against Hungary.

In August 2016 Ronan recalled Beckett to a young and predominantly home-based senior squad for a training camp in Wales. She played in two challenge matches against the Welsh hosts, winning mild praise from Ronan: "Emma Beckett who was recalled to the squad did herself no harm".
