= Jemma Connor-Iommi =

Irish footballer (born 1985)

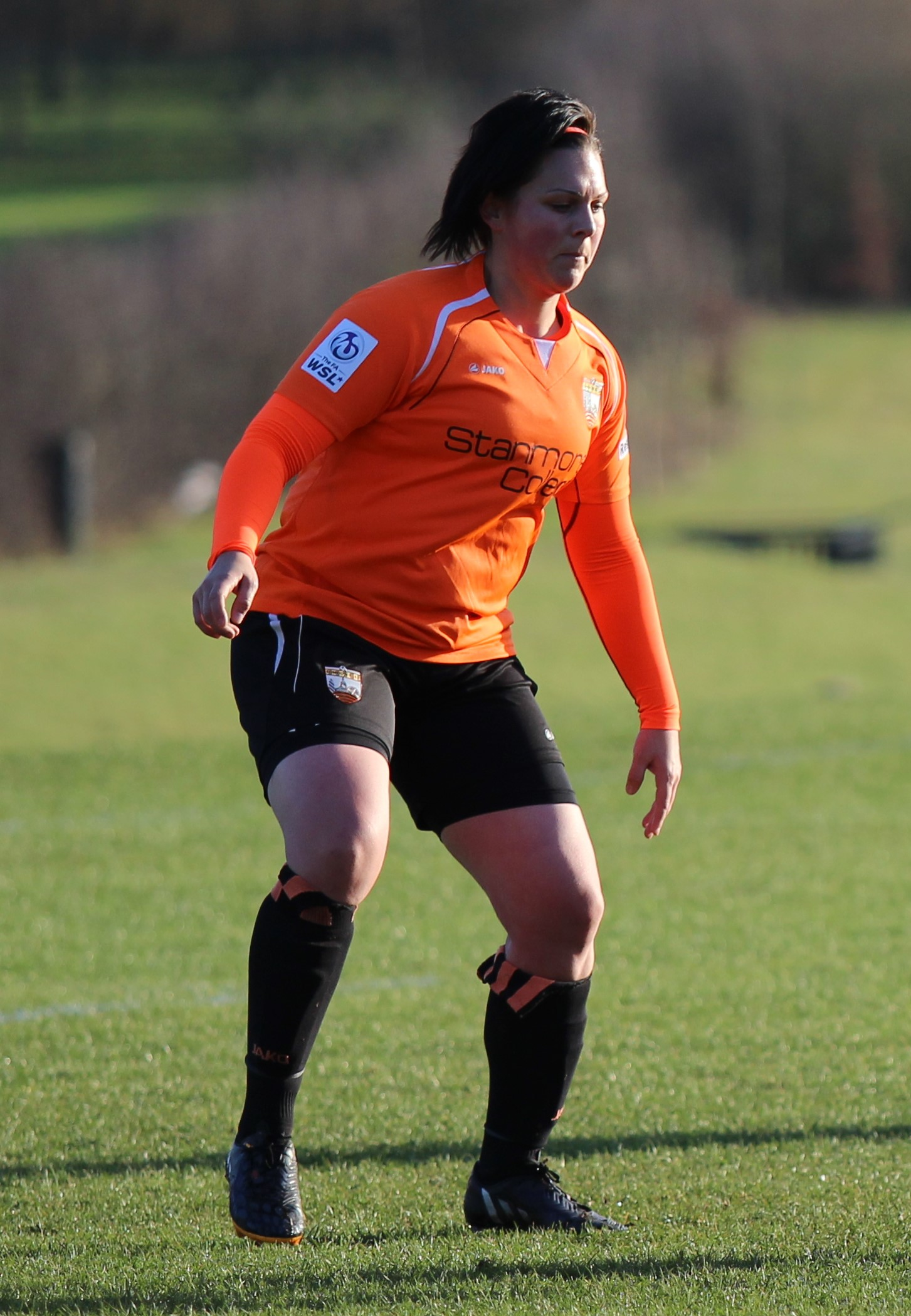
- Connor-Iommi playing for London Bees in 2015

Personal information
- Full name: Jemma Louise Connor-Iommi
- Date of birth: 23 May 1985 (age 41)
- Place of birth: Sutton Coldfield, England
- Height: 5 ft 8 in (1.73 m)
- Positions: Centre-back; defensive midfielder

Youth career
- Aston Villa Ladies

Senior career*
Years	Team	Apps	(Gls)
2005–2006	Doncaster Rovers Belles	0	(0)
2006–2010	Sporting Club Albion		
2008–2010	Birmingham City Ladies		
2010–2013	Nottingham Forest		
2014	Oxford United Ladies		
2015	London Bees		

International career
2008–2010	Republic of Ireland		
- * Club domestic league appearances and goals

Jemma Louise Connor-Iommi (born 28 May 1985) is a football coach and former player. She most recently played as a defender for London Bees. Born in England, she represented the Republic of Ireland at senior international level.

== Club career ==
After two years at the national academy for women's football in Gateshead, 18-year-old Connor-Iommi went to the United States on a scholarship in 2003. She returned home six months into the four-year course due to a weight problem.

Connor-Iommi lost 9 stone (57 kg) and played for Doncaster Rovers Belles then West Bromwich Albion Ladies. She joined Premier League Birmingham City in 2008 but continued to appear for West Bromwich Albion (then called Sporting Club Albion) in the Midland Combination.

She also played futsal for Team United Birmingham.

With Birmingham City inactive until the FA WSL started in spring 2011, Connor-Iommi joined Nottingham Forest in the 2010–2011 Premier League. In 2012–13 Connor-Iommi captained Nottingham Forest while also working as a manager in a school.

When Oxford United were elected into FA WSL 2 in 2014 Connor-Iommi signed for them. After playing in every match for Oxford, she joined WSL 2 rivals London Bees ahead of the 2015 campaign. In June 2016, Connor-Iommi returned to West Brom as a development manager.

== International career ==
Connor-Iommi was eligible to play for the Republic of Ireland national team through her Irish father. She was called up for the first time in May 2008. She then went on a tour to America that autumn.

In October 2008 she participated in Ireland's Euro 2009 play-off defeat by Iceland, under the name Jemma O'Connor.

== Personal life ==
Tony Iommi is Jemma's mother's cousin. In 2009, Connor-Iommi was working as a warrant officer, which she described as: "knocking on offenders' doors and hoping not to get your head kicked in". She later joined Nottinghamshire Police transferring to West Midlands Police then Leicestershire Police as an Inspector. Since 2022, she has been manager of the Great Britain Police women's football team.
