= Tony Gervaise =

Scottish footballer and manager

Personal information
- Date of birth: 10 May 1955 (age 71)
- Place of birth: Paisley, Scotland
- Position: Left back

Team information
- Current team: Ayr United Under 14s coach

Senior career*
Years	Team	Apps	(Gls)
1977–1984	Clydebank	163	(2)
1984–1985	Hamilton Academical	9	(0)
1985–1986	Queen of the South	30	(0)
1986–1987	Stranraer	6	(0)
Total		208	(2)

Managerial career
- 1987–?: Clydebank (assistant)
- 2001–2004: Scotland women (assistant)
- 2005–2008: Scotland women U15, U17 & U19 (manager)
- 2008–2009: Arsenal Ladies (assistant)
- 2009–2010: Arsenal Ladies (manager)
- * Club domestic league appearances and goals

Tony Gervaise (born 10 May 1955, in Paisley) is a Scottish association football former player turned women's football coach. He is a former manager of Arsenal Ladies, having succeeded Vic Akers in 2009.

== Career ==
Gervaise played as a left back, with a professional career in the Scottish Football League and Scottish Premier League at clubs Clydebank, Hamilton Academical, Queen of the South and Stranraer between 1977 and 1987. At Queens he was signed by manager Nobby Clark under whom Gervaise played in a successful promotion campaign. He made a career total of 208 league appearances, scoring 2 goals.

After retiring as a player, Gervaise was an assistant coach at Clydebank, helping the club reach the Scottish Cup semi-finals in 1990. He later joined the Scottish Football Association's Women's Section, and in 2001 he became assistant coach of the Scottish women's national team. In 2004, he became Head of Youth Development at the SFA, and the following year took over the Scottish U-15, U-17 and U-19 girls' sides.

In 2008, he moved south of the border to become Arsenal Ladies' assistant manager, alongside Vic Akers. The following year he succeeded Akers as manager after the latter's retirement. He resigned after just 20 games, claiming there was a lack of clarity about who was in charge.
