= Sally Wade =

English–born football player

Personal information
- Full name: Sally Jane Wade
- Date of birth: 13 July 1984 (age 42)
- Place of birth: Hillingdon, England
- Height: 5 ft 4 in (1.63 m)
- Positions: Defender; midfielder

Team information
- Current team: Beaconsfield Town Women

College career
Years	Team	Apps	(Gls)
2002–2004	SBU Bearcats		
2005	KSU Owls		

Senior career*
Years	Team	Apps	(Gls)
2007–2010	Watford		
2010–2017	Barnet		
2017–2023?	Holyport		
2023–	Beaconsfield Town Women		

International career^{‡}
2008–2012	Wales	19	(0)
- * Club domestic league appearances and goals ‡ National team caps and goals as of 1 May 2011

Sally Jane Wade (born 13 July 1984) is an English–born football player who plays for the Welsh national team and Beaconsfield Town Women. Wade plays as a defender or midfielder and has accumulated almost twenty caps for Wales.

== Club career ==
Wade attended Chalfonts Community College then moved to America to play varsity soccer while attending Southwest Baptist University. After three successful seasons with The Bearcats, Wade moved to Kennesaw State University for a final season of college soccer in 2005.

After returning to England, Wade played for and captained Watford. She signed for FA Women's Premier League National Division newcomers Barnet in 2010. In March 2011 Wade scored the winning penalty as Barnet won the FA Women's Premier League Cup, beating Nottingham Forest after a 0–0 draw in the final at Adams Park.

Wade signed for Holyport F.C in 2017 making 38 appearances and scoring 10 goals.

In 2023, Wade signed for Beaconsfield Town F.C

== International career ==
Wade made her international debut for Wales, aged 23, in a 1–1 friendly draw in Portugal in January 2008. She was eligible for to play for Wales via her Welsh grandmother.

== Personal life ==
Wade works as a Cardiac Physiologist at Wycombe Hospital.
