= 2026 Brooklyn FC (women) fall season =

2026 Brooklyn FC fall season

Brooklyn FC
2026 season
- Head coach: Alex Smith
- All statistics correct as of May 31, 2025.

The 2026 fall season of Brooklyn FC is the team's third season as a professional women's soccer team.

The USLS plans to adopt its first spring-to-fall campaign in 2027. This means that the 2026 season is an smaller season with 14 matches per team.

== Roster ==
As of October 13, 2026

Note: Flags indicate national team as defined under FIFA eligibility rules; some limited exceptions apply. Players may hold more than one non-FIFA nationality.

No.	Pos.	Nation	Player
00	GK	ARM	Sophine Kevorkian
1	GK	USA	Breanna Norris
2	DF	USA	Laila Booker
3	FW	USA	Tziarra King
5	DF	USA	Jordan Thompson
6	MF	GHA	Jennifer Cudjoe
7	DF	KOR	Shin Na-yeong
8	MF	USA	Emma Loving
9	FW	USA	Jessica Garziano
10	FW	IRL	Rebecca Cooke
11	FW	USA	Sofia Lewis

No.	Pos.	Nation	Player
13	MF	USA	Sara D'Appolonia
14	MF	CRO	Kiki Marković
17	MF	USA	Jilly Shimkin
19	FW	USA	Catherine Zimmerman
20	MF	USA	Sophia Lowenberg (on loan from Boston Legacy FC)
22	DF	USA	Lauren Gogal
21	MF	USA	Carlee Giammona
23	FW	USA	Jackie Richards
25	GK	USA	Nicolette Pasquarella
27	MF	USA	Ashlyn Miller
55	DF	USA	Annie Williams-Arlington

=== Staff ===
Technical staff
Head Coach	(United States) Alex Smith

== Competitions ==
=== USL Super League ===
==== Regular season standings ====
Pos	Team	Pld	W	L	T	GF	GA	GD	Pts	Qualification
4	Lexington SC	12	5	5	2	20	13	+7	17	Playoffs
5	Dallas Trinity FC	11	4	4	3	14	14	0	15	
6	Brooklyn FC	12	3	6	3	13	25	−12	12	
7	Tampa Bay Sun FC	11	2	5	4	11	16	−5	10	
8	Fort Lauderdale United FC	13	2	9	2	7	23	−16	8	

Updated to match(es) played on November 21, 2026. Source: USL Super League
Rules for classification: 1) head-to-head points; 2) total goal differential; 3) total goals scored; 4) disciplinary points; 5) drawing of lots.

==== Matches ====
August 15, 2026 1	Lexington SC	3–0	Brooklyn FC	Lexington SC Stadium
	Barry 58'; McCain 61'; White 82'	Report		Attendance: 3,333; Referee: Iryna Petrunok

August 22, 2026 2	Brooklyn FC	1–4	DC Power FC	Maimonides Park
	Thompson 75'	Report	Jaskaniec 6'; Abera 8' 83' (pen.); Lussi 61' (pen.)	Attendance: 660; Referee: Jamie Padilla

August 28, 2026 3	Fort Lauderdale United FC	1–0	Brooklyn FC	Amerant Bank Field
	Vernis 46'	Report		Attendance: 1,291; Referee: Lauren Aldrich

September 6, 2026 4	Dallas Trinity FC	3–0	Brooklyn FC	Cotton Bowl
	Gamero 8'; Castain 28'; Hamid 88'	Report		Attendance: 1,806; Referee: Jaclyn Metz

September 13, 2026 5	Brooklyn FC	3–2	Sporting JAX	Brooklyn, New York
3:00 PM ET	Zimmerman 5', 82' (yellow card) 74'; King 10'; Cudjoe (yellow card) 57'	Report	DeSmit 17' (yellow card) 57'; Teater (yellow card) 76'; Kenton 90+4'	Stadium: Maimonides Park; Attendance: 713; Referee: Marie Durr

September 20, 2026 6	Carolina Ascent FC	1–0	Brooklyn FC	American Legion Memorial Stadium
	Groom 63'			Attendance: 2,206; Referee: Gloria Resendiz

October 3, 2026 7	Brooklyn FC	1–0	Fort Lauderdale United FC	Maimonides Park
	Giammona 76'			Attendance: 529; Referee: Shawn Tehini

October 10, 2026 8	Brooklyn FC	1–1	Dallas Trinity FC	Maimonides Park
	King 30'		Castain 86'	Attendance: 768; Referee: Shaye Lane

October 24, 2026 9	Brooklyn FC	1–0	Tampa Bay Sun FC	Maimonides Park
	Zimmerman 90'			Attendance: 733; Referee: Kelsey Harms

October 31, 2026 10	Sporting JAX	4–4	Brooklyn FC	Jacksonville, Florida
5:00 PM ET	DeSmit 27'; Kenton 33'; Puerta 68' (pen.) 80'	Report	Zimmerman 14'; Miller 25'; Richards 56', 57'	Stadium: Hodges Stadium; Attendance: 652; Referee: Russell Miller

November 7, 2026 11	Brooklyn FC	2–2	Carolina Ascent FC	Maimonides Park
	Richards 88'; Giammona 90+5'	Report	Aguilera 44' (pen.) 90' (pen.)	Referee: Lauren Aldrich

November 12, 2026 12	DC Power FC	4–0	Brooklyn FC	Audi Field
	Jaskaniec 10'; Abera 27'; Colbert 33'; Lussi 69'	Report		Attendance: 1,429; Referee: Atahan Yaya

November 21, 2026 13	Tampa Bay Sun FC	2–0	Brooklyn FC	Suncoast Credit Union Field
	Hill 34'; Dale 53'	Report		Attendance: 1,624; Referee: Edson Carvajal

November 28, 2026 14	Brooklyn FC	v	Lexington SC

== Transactions ==
=== Transfers in ===
Date	Player	Pos.	Previous club	Fee/notes	Ref.
31 July 2026	(United States) Ashlyn Miller	FW	(Australia) Brisbane Roar	Transfer	
5 August 2026	(United States) Jilly Shimkin	MF	(United States) Tampa Bay Sun FC	Transfer	
6 August 2026	(United States) Carlee Giammona	MF	(United States) Tampa Bay Sun FC	Transfer	
10 August 2026	(United States) Tziarra King	MF	Free agent		
22 August 2026	(United States) Sara D'Appolonia	MF	(Germany) SC Sand	Transfer	
6 October 2026	(Armenia) Sophine Kevorkian	GK		Transfer	

=== Loans in ===
Date	Player	Pos.	Loaned from	Fee/notes	Ref.
July 20, 2026	(United States) Sophia Lowenberg	MF	(United States) Boston Legacy FC	End of year	

=== Transfers out ===
Date	Player	Pos.	Destination club	Fee/notes	Ref.
July 10, 2026	(United States) Samantha Kroeger	MF	(United States) Tampa Bay Sun FC	Free	
July 10, 2026	(Croatia) Ana Maria Marković	FW	(Croatia) ŽNK Hajduk	Free	
July 10, 2026	(Brazil) Mylena Freitas	FW	(Portugal) FC Porto		
July 10, 2026	(United States) Leah Scarpelli	DF	(United States) Tampa Bay Sun FC	Free	
July 10, 2026	(United States) Alice Barbieri	DF			
July 10, 2026	(United States) Kelsey Hill	DF	(United States) Tampa Bay Sun FC	Free	
July 10, 2026	(United States) Kelsey Daugherty	GK			
