= List of Brooklyn FC (women) players =

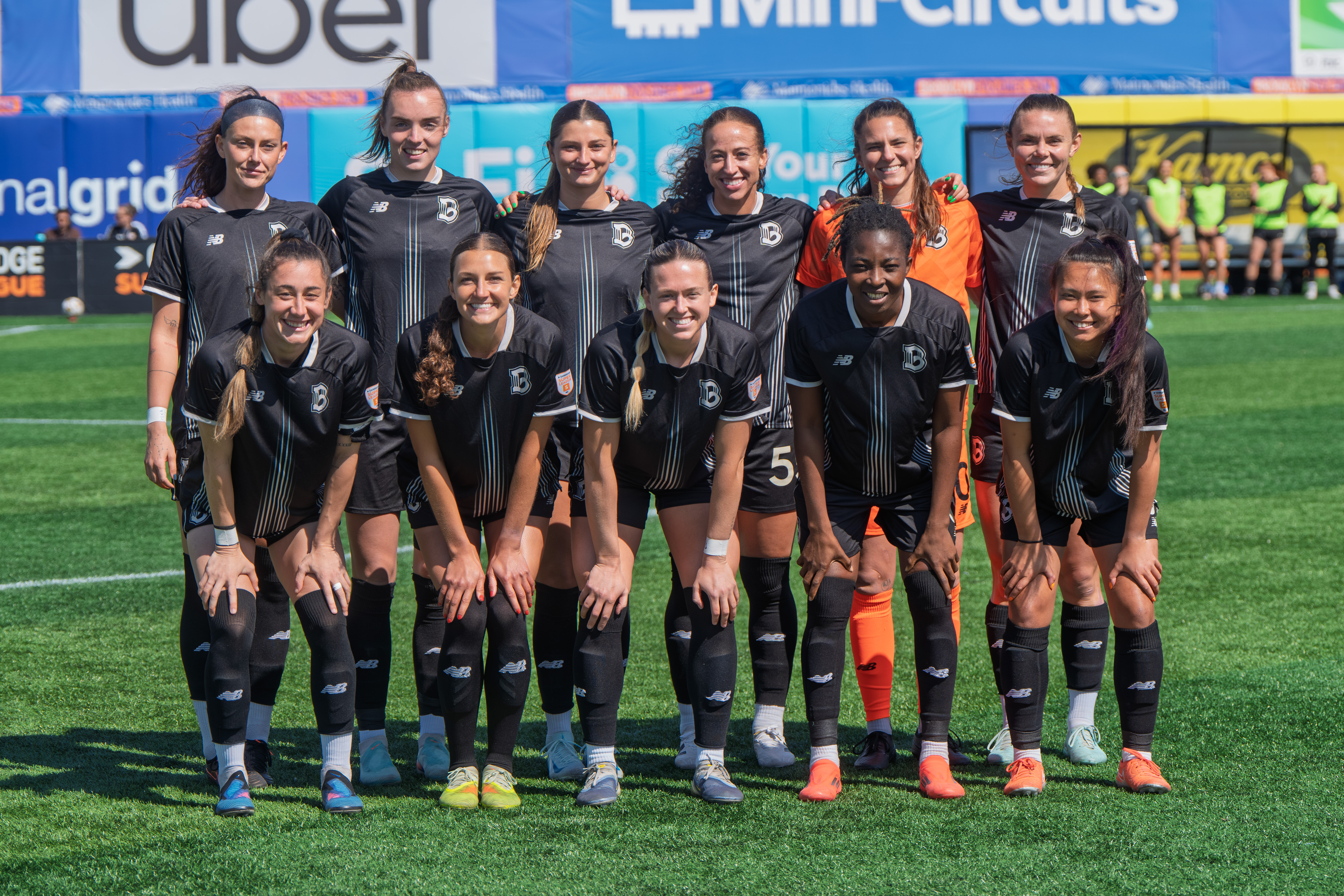
Brooklyn FC lineup, week 26 of 2025–26: Scarpelli, Cooke, Garziano, Williams, Daugherty, Hill Breslin, Childers, Loving, Cudjoe, Kroeger

Brooklyn FC is an American professional women's soccer club which began play in the inaugural season of the USL Super League. All players who have made a competitive appearance for Brooklyn FC are listed below.

== Key ==
- The list is ordered alphabetically.
- Appearances as a substitute are included.
- Statistics are correct as of May 16, 2026, the end of the 2025–26 USL Super League season, and are updated once a year after the conclusion of the USL Super League season.
- Players whose names are highlighted in **bold** were active players on the Brooklyn FC roster as of the list's most recent update.

Positions key
GK	Goalkeeper
DF	Defender
MF	Midfielder
FW	Forward

Nationality
Unless otherwise noted, the nationality of a player is determined by the country they most recently represented in international play, or if said player has not played international football then by their country of birth.
Position
Playing positions are listed according to the player's roster designation as of the list's most recent update.
Years
Years are defined as the first and last calendar years in which the player was rostered for the club in any of the competitions listed below.
Appearances and goals
This list counts appearances and goals in the USL Super League and USL Super League playoffs.

== Players ==
Yrs	No.	Pos	Nat	Player	Total		USL Super League		Playoffs	
Yrs	No.	Pos	Nat	Player	Apps	Goals	Apps	Goals	Apps	Goals
2024–2025	7	MF	(Morocco) MAR	Salma Amani	10	1	10	1	0	0
2025–	23	DF	(United States) USA	Alice Barbieri	9	0	9	0	0	0
2024–	12	MF	(United States) USA	Hope Breslin	51	4	51	4	0	0
2026–	15	MF	(United States) USA	Rylan Childers	8	1	8	1	0	0
2025–	10	FW	(Republic of Ireland) IRL	Rebecca Cooke	26	9	26	9	0	0
2024	13	FW	(United States) USA	Isabel Cox	14	3	14	3	0	0
2025–	6	MF	(Ghana) GHA	Jennifer Cudjoe	14	0	14	0	0	0
2025–	30	GK	(United States) USA	Kelsey Daugherty	18	0	18	0	0	0
2024–2025	10	FW	(England) ENG	Kess Elmore	11	0	11	0	0	0
2025	13	DF	(United States) USA	Ginger Fontenot	3	0	3	0	0	0
2025–	8	FW	(Brazil) BRA	Mylena Freitas	19	1	19	1	0	0
2024–	9	FW	(United States) USA	Jessica Garziano (Note: Garziano scored Brooklyn's first-ever goal, which came against Spokane Zephyr FC on September 8, 2024.)	55	6	55	6	0	0
2024–2025	31	FW	(United States) USA	Mackenzie George	28	4	28	4	0	0
2025–	22	DF	(United States) USA	Lauren Gogal	3	0	3	0	0	0
2025	33	GK	(United States) USA	Alexa Goldberg	1	0	1	0	0	0
2024–2025	23	FW	(Brazil) BRA	Luana Grabias	27	5	27	5	0	0
2024–2025	22	DF	(United States) USA	Tori Hansen	7	0	7	0	0	0
2024–	24	DF	(United States) USA	Kelsey Hill	52	2	52	2	0	0
2025	14	FW	(United States) USA	Caroline Kelly	5	2	5	2	0	0
2024–	3	MF	(United States) USA	Samantha Kroeger	56	1	56	1	0	0
2025–	7	FW	(Croatia) CRO	Ana Maria Marković	23	0	23	0	0	0
2025–	14	MF	(Croatia) CRO	Kiki Marković	10	0	10	0	0	0
2025–	11	FW	(United States) USA	Sofia Lewis	27	2	27	2	0	0
2025–	4	MF	(United States) USA	Emma Loving	23	1	23	1	0	0
2024–2025	1	GK	(Puerto Rico) PUR	Sydney Martinez (Note: Martinez was Brooklyn's inaugural signing, announced on June 10, 2024.)	11	0	11	0	0	0
2025–	5	DF	(South Korea) KOR	Shin Na-yeong	12	0	12	0	0	0
2025–	1	GK	(United States) USA	Breanna Norris	10	0	10	0	0	0
2024–2025	4	DF	(United States) USA	Allison Pantuso	28	1	28	1	0	0
2025–	25	GK	(United States) USA	Nicolette Pasquarella	1	0	1	0	0	0
2025	28	DF	(United States) USA	Grace Phillpotts	6	1	6	1	0	0
2024–2025	5	DF	(United States) USA	Sasha Pickard	23	0	23	0	0	0
2024–2025	19	FW	(United States) USA	Mackenzie Pluck	23	1	23	1	0	0
2024–2025	27	FW	(United States) USA	Carlyn Presley	6	0	6	0	0	0
2025	18	DF	(United States) USA	Emily Pringle	6	0	6	0	0	0
2024–2025	18	GK	(United States) USA	Neeku Purcell	17	0	17	0	0	0
2024–2026	2	DF	(United States) USA	Samantha Rosette	28	1	28	1	0	0
2024–	17	DF	(United States) USA	Leah Scarpelli	49	2	49	2	0	0
2024–2025	8	FW	(United States) USA	Dana Scheriff	22	3	22	3	0	0
2024–2025	20	DF	(United States) USA	Nikia Smith	3	0	3	0	0	0
2025–	16	DF	(United States) USA	Jordan Thompson	26	1	26	1	0	0
2025–	55	DF	(United States) USA	Annie Williams	25	1	25	1	0	0
2024–2025	21	MF	(United States) USA	Emily Yaple	20	0	20	0	0	0
2025–	34	FW	(United States) USA	Catherine Zimmerman	18	6	18	6	0	0

== By nationality ==
In total, 43 players representing 9 different countries have appeared for Brooklyn FC.

Note: Countries indicate national team as defined under FIFA eligibility rules. Players may hold more than one non-FIFA nationality.

Country	Total players
Brazil	2
Croatia	2
England	1
Ghana	1
Ireland	1
Morocco	1
Puerto Rico	1
South Korea	1
United States	33

== See also ==
- List of top-division football clubs in CONCACAF countries
- List of professional sports teams in the United States and Canada
