= 2025–26 Brooklyn FC (women) season =

2025–26 Brooklyn FC season

Brooklyn FC
2025–26 season
- Head coach: Tomás Tengarrinha
- USL Super League: 7th
- All statistics correct as of May 31, 2025.

The 2025–26 season of Brooklyn FC is the team's second season as a professional women's soccer team.

== Roster and staff ==
=== Roster ===
As of December 3, 2025

Note: Flags indicate national team as defined under FIFA eligibility rules; some limited exceptions apply. Players may hold more than one non-FIFA nationality.

No.	Pos.	Nation	Player
1	GK	USA	Breanna Norris
2	DF	USA	Samantha Rosette (captain)
3	MF	USA	Samantha Kroeger
4	MF	USA	Emma Loving
5	DF	KOR	Shin Na-yeong
6	MF	GHA	Jennifer Cudjoe
7	FW	CRO	Ana Maria Marković
8	FW	BRA	Mylena Freitas
9	FW	USA	Jessica Garziano
10	FW	IRL	Rebecca Cooke
11	FW	USA	Sofia Lewis

No.	Pos.	Nation	Player
12	MF	USA	Hope Breslin
14	MF	CRO	Kiki Marković
16	DF	USA	Jordan Thompson
17	DF	USA	Leah Scarpelli
22	DF	USA	Lauren Gogal
23	DF	USA	Alice Barbieri
24	DF	USA	Kelsey Hill
25	GK	USA	Nicolette Pasquarella
30	GK	USA	Kelsey Daugherty
34	FW	USA	Catherine Zimmerman
55	DF	USA	Annie Williams

=== Staff ===
Technical staff
Head Coach	(Portugal) Tomás Tengarrinha
First Assistant Coach	(Portugal) Francisca Ferreira

== Competitions ==
=== Regular season standings ===
Pos	Team	Pld	W	L	T	GF	GA	GD	Pts
5	Spokane Zephyr	28	10	9	9	34	28	+6	39
6	DC Power	28	8	11	9	34	32	+2	33
7	Brooklyn	28	6	14	8	31	44	−13	26
8	Tampa Bay Sun	28	5	14	9	27	46	−19	24
9	Fort Lauderdale United	28	5	15	8	30	62	−32	23

Updated to match(es) played on May 16, 2026. Source: Gainbridge Super League
Rules for classification: 1) head-to-head points; 2) total goal differential; 3) total goals scored; 4) disciplinary points; 5) drawing of lots.

=== Matches ===
==== August ====
August 23, 2025 1	Brooklyn FC	2–1	Tampa Bay Sun FC	Maimonides Park
	Zimmerman 56'; Williams 72'; Loving (yellow card) 76'; Kroeger (yellow card) 87'; Scarpelli (yellow card) 90+6'; Cooke (yellow card) 90+8'	Report	Listro (yellow card) 22'; Elgin (yellow card) 53'; Giammona 90+4'	Attendance: 1,275; Referee: Kaitlyn Trowbridge

August 30, 2025 2	Dallas Trinity FC	1–0	Brooklyn FC	Cotton Bowl
	McCutcheon 13'; Tamara Bolt (yellow card) 45+5'; Foster (yellow card) 79'	Report	Cooke (yellow card) 45'; Thompson (yellow card) 46'; Kroeger (yellow card) 62'; Breslin (yellow card) 63'; Loving (yellow card) 86'; Freitas (yellow card) 90+3'	Attendance: 2,447; Referee: Alexandra Billeter

==== September ====
September 3, 2025 3	Brooklyn FC	1–1	Spokane Zephyr FC	Maimonides Park
	Loving 56'; Freitas (yellow card) 86'	Report	Jaskaniec (yellow card) 84' (goal) 90+1'	Attendance: 1,502; Referee: Danielle Chesky

September 7, 2025 4	Lexington SC	2–0	Brooklyn FC	Lexington SC Stadium
	Barry 35', 39'; Moyer (yellow card) 80'; Johnson (yellow card) 84' (red card)	Report	Breslin (yellow card) 9'; Freitas (yellow card) 66'; Marković (yellow card) 72'	Attendance: 2,433; Referee: Gloria Martinez

September 18, 2025 5	DC Power FC	2–2	Brooklyn FC	Audi Field
	Abera 19'; Gourley 33'; Bedoya 52'	Report	Freitas (yellow card) 23'; Hill 58'; Cooke 80'	Attendance: 551; Referee: Rachel Swett

September 28, 2025 6	Brooklyn FC	1–2	Fort Lauderdale United FC	Maimonides Park
	Barbieri (yellow card) 8'; Loving (yellow card) 33'; Hill (yellow card) 43'; Breslin 87'	Report	Nyamekye 9'; Locklear 45+1'	Attendance: 1,268; Referee: Jaclyn Metz

==== October ====
October 4, 2025 7	Brooklyn FC	3–3	Sporting JAX	Maimonides Park
	Breslin (yellow card) 18'; Cooke (yellow card) 45+3' (goal) 90'; Scarpelli 66'; Rosette 86'; Daugherty (yellow card) 90+3'	Report	Boman 16'; Murray (yellow card) 39'; Kenton 76'; Hughes (yellow card) 90+3'; DeSmit 90+5'	Attendance: 913; Referee: Marie Durr

October 11, 2025 8	Brooklyn FC	2–2	Tampa Bay Sun FC	Maimonides Park
	Cooke 61'; Zimmerman 90+1'; Marković (yellow card) 90+6'	Report	Tankersley (yellow card) 26' (goal) 80'; Bessette (yellow card) 26'; Flint 38' (yellow card) 62'; Gaillard (yellow card) 84'	Attendance: 735; Referee: Lauren Aldrich

October 18, 2025 9	Brooklyn FC	1–2	Carolina Ascent FC	Brooklyn
	Scarpelli (yellow card) 23'; Thompson (yellow card) 42'; Lewis 67'; Breslin (yellow card) 75'	Report	Martinez 24'; Aguilera (yellow card) 35' (goal) 56'; Walker (yellow card) 79'; Morris (yellow card) 89'; Harding (yellow card) 90'	Stadium: Maimonides Park; Attendance: 1,075; Referee: Carlos Rodriguez

==== November ====
November 1, 2025 10	Fort Lauderdale United FC	1–1	Brooklyn FC	Beyond Bancard Field
	Kelli Van Treeck 39'; Nyamekye (yellow card) 67'; Smith (yellow card) 86' (red card)	Report	Cooke 7'; Zimmerman (yellow card) 30'; Thompson (yellow card) 76'; Rosette (yellow card) 90'	Attendance: 1,732; Referee: Edson Carvajal

November 8, 2025 11	Brooklyn FC	1–0	DC Power FC	Maimonides Park
	Scarpelli 49' (yellow card) 73'; Daugherty (yellow card) 76'; Williams (yellow card) 89'	Report	Almendariz (yellow card) 31'; Duong (yellow card) 45'; Constant (yellow card) 83'	Attendance: 892; Referee: Luis Arroyo

November 15, 2025 12	Brooklyn FC	0–2	Lexington SC	Maimonides Park
		Report	Weinert 12'; McCain 20'	Attendance: 796; Referee: Thomas Snyder

November 22, 2025 13	Brooklyn FC	1–0	Spokane Zephyr FC	Maimonides Park
	Garziano (yellow card) 19'; Cudjoe (yellow card) 32'; Mylena Freitas (yellow card) 72'; Sofia Lewis 74'	Report		Attendance: 923; Referee: Atahan Yaya

==== December ====
December 6, 2025 14	Carolina Ascent FC	1–0	Brooklyn FC	Charlotte, North Carolina
	Harding 44'	Report	Hill (yellow card) 75'; Gogal (yellow card) 90+3'	Stadium: American Legion Memorial Stadium; Attendance: 2,399; Referee: Mark Verso

December 13, 2025 15	Tampa Bay Sun FC	0–3	Brooklyn FC	Suncoast Credit Union Field
	Hendrix (yellow card) 29'; Pluck (yellow card) 45+1'; Nasello (yellow card) 76'	Report	Na-yeong (yellow card) 25'; Freitas (yellow card) 39'; Zimmerman 47', 71'; Breslin 59'; Cooke (yellow card) 76'	Attendance: 1,757; Referee: Elvis Osmanovic

==== January and February ====
January 31, 2026 16	Dallas Trinity FC	1–1	Brooklyn FC	Cotton Bowl
	Flynn (yellow card) 1'; Lancaster 58'	Report	Garziano (yellow card) 63'; Thompson (yellow card) 73'; Cooke 83'	Attendance: 1,527; Referee: Emmy Nonso-Ayakwo

February 14, 2026 17	Fort Lauderdale United FC	3–3	Brooklyn FC	Beyond Bancard Field
	Hugh (yellow card) 19' (goal) 30'; Hamid 64'; Gordon (yellow card) 89'; Simpson 90'	Report	Zimmerman 41' (yellow card) 90+9'; Loving (yellow card) 42'; Freitas 46'; Cudjoe (yellow card) 71'; Cooke (yellow card) 75' (red card) 75'; Thompson 81'	Attendance: 2,026; Referee: Matthew Thompson

==== March ====
March 7, 2026 18	Brooklyn FC	0–2	DC Power FC	Maimonides Park
		Report	Walker 32' (pen.); Abera 63'	Attendance: 624; Referee: Stephen Foster

March 14, 2026 19	Spokane Zephyr FC	3–0	Brooklyn FC	One Spokane Stadium
	Tappan 36'; Waldeck 41'; Ginger Fontenot 61'	Report		Attendance: 825; Referee: Laura Rodriguez

March 18, 2026 20	Tampa Bay Sun FC	0–3	Brooklyn FC	Suncoast Credit Union Field
		Report	Cooke 6'; Zimmerman 45+3'; Breslin 56'	Attendance: 2,896; Referee: Alejo Calume

March 22, 2026 21	Brooklyn FC	0–2	Carolina Ascent FC	Maimonides Park
		Report	Corbin 21' (pen.); Studer 71'	Attendance: 796; Referee: Atahan Yaya

March 28, 2026 22	Brooklyn FC	0–1	Lexington SC	Maimonides Park
		Report	Weinert 8'; McCain (yellow card) 76' (yellow-red card) 90+7'	Attendance: 1,034; Referee: Laadi Issaka

==== April ====
April 4, 2026 23	Sporting JAX	2–0	Brooklyn FC	Hodges Stadium
	Kenton 17'; Boman 69'	Report		Attendance: 8,978; Referee: Lauren Aldrich

April 12, 2026 24	Brooklyn FC	3–0	Dallas Trinity FC	Maimonides Park
	Breslin (yellow card) 32' (red card) 69'; Hill 44'; Cooke 57', 85'	Report		Attendance: 1,483; Referee: Carlos Rodriguez

April 26, 2026 25	Brooklyn FC	1–1	Dallas Trinity FC	Maimonides Park
	Childers 79'	Report	Lancaster 90'	Attendance: 1,001; Referee: Braeden Frey

==== May ====
May 3, 2026 26	Sporting JAX	2–1	Brooklyn FC	Jacksonville, Florida
5:00 PM ET	DeSmit 17' (pen.), 58'; Parks (red card) 68'; Balaam (yellow card) 71'	Report	Cudjoe (yellow card) 49'; Brown 67' (o.g.); Cooke (yellow card) 69'	Stadium: Hodges Stadium; Attendance: 8,954; Referee: Kaitlyn Trowbridge

May 10, 2026 27	Lexington SC	3–1	Brooklyn FC	Lexington SC Stadium
	Weinert 39', 45'; Barry 44'	Report	Cooke 69'	Attendance: 2,111; Referee: Shawn Tehini

May 17, 2026 28	Spokane Zephyr FC	4–0	Brooklyn FC	One Spokane Stadium
	Marković 2' (o.g.); Knox 36'; Reiss 82'; Silano 88'	Report		Attendance: 2,017; Referee: Dion Coxe-Trieger

== Transfers ==
=== Transfers in ===
Date	Player	Pos.	Previous club	Fee/notes	Ref.
July 2, 2025	(United States) Catherine Zimmerman	FW	(Australia) Western United FC	Free agent	
July 11, 2025	(United States) Breanna Norris	GK	(United States) Angel City FC	Free agent	
July 14, 2025	(United States) Sofia Lewis	FW	(Portugal) Marítimo	Free agent	
July 15, 2025	(United States) Alice Barbieri	DF	(Italy) UC Sampdoria	Free agent	
July 17, 2025	(United States) Jordan Thompson	DF	(Australia) Sydney FC	Free agent	
July 28, 2025	(South Korea) Shin Na-yeong	DF	(United States) Lexington SC	Free agent	
July 29, 2025	(United States) Emma Loving	MF	(France) RC Strasbourg Alsace	Free agent	
July 30, 2025	(United States) Kelsey Daugherty	GK	(Scotland) Celtic	Free agent	
August 8, 2025	(United States) Emily Pringle	DF	(United States) San Diego Wave FC	Free agent	
August 15, 2025	(United States) Ana Maria Marković	FW	(Portugal) Damaiense	Free agent	
August 15, 2025	(Croatia) Kiki Marković	FW	(Switzerland) FC Rapperswil-Jona	Free agent	
August 18, 2025	(United States) Annie Williams	DF	(Italy) Parma	Free agent	
August 19, 2025	(United States) Nicolette Pasquarella	GK	(United States) Stony Brook Seawolves	Rookie	
August 21, 2025	(Republic of Ireland) Rebecca Cooke	FW	(Republic of Ireland) Shelbourne	Free agent	
August 25, 2025	(Brazil) Mylena Freitas	FW	(Portugal) Braga	Free agent	
November 5, 2025	(Ghana) Jennifer Cudjoe	MF	(United States) DC Power FC	Free agent	
December 3, 2025	(United States) Lauren Gogal	DF	(United States) Utah Royals	Free agent	

=== Transfers out ===
Date	Player	Pos.	Destination club	Fee/notes	Ref.
June 4, 2025	(United States) Neeku Purcell	GK	(United States) Seattle Reign FC	Transfer	
June 18, 2025	(United States) Ginger Fontenot	DF	(United States) Spokane Zephyr FC	Out of contract	
June 18, 2025	(United States) Alexa Goldberg	GK	(United States) Kansas City Current II	Out of contract	
June 18, 2025	(Brazil) Luana Grabias	MF	(United States) Carolina Ascent FC	Out of contract	
June 18, 2025	(United States) Caroline Kelly	FW	(United States) Dallas Trinity FC	Out of contract	
June 18, 2025	(Puerto Rico) Sydney Martinez	GK	(United States) Carolina Ascent FC	Out of contract	
June 18, 2025	(United States) Haley Miller	MF	(United States) Keiser Seahawks	Out of contract	
June 18, 2025	(United States) Allison Pantuso	DF	(United States) Lexington SC	Out of contract	
June 18, 2025	(United States) Grace Phillpotts	DF	(United States) Sporting Club Jacksonville	Out of contract	
June 18, 2025	(United States) Sasha Pickard	DF	(Mexico) Santos Laguna	Out of contract	
June 18, 2025	(United States) Carlyn Presley	DF	(Portugal) Valadares Gaia	Out of contract	
June 18, 2025	(United States) Dana Scheriff	FW	(Czech Republic) SK Slavia Prague	Out of contract	
June 18, 2025	(United States) Nikia Smith	DF	Unattached	Out of contract	
June 18, 2025	(United States) Emily Yaple	MF	(Germany) SC Sand	Out of contract	
July 2, 2025	(England) Kess Elmore	FW	(Austria) St. Pölten	Out of contract	
July 15, 2025	(Morocco) Salma Amani	FW	(Morocco) Wydad AC	Out of contract	
July 15, 2025	(United States) Tori Hansen	DF	(Czech Republic) AC Sparta Prague	Out of contract	
July 16, 2025	(United States) Mackenzie George	FW	(United States) Carolina Ascent FC	Transfer	
July 28, 2025	(United States) Mackenzie Pluck	MF	(United States) Tampa Bay Sun FC	Out of contract	
October 22, 2025	(United States) Emily Pringle	DF	Retirement		

== Statistics ==
=== Appearances ===
Numbers outside parentheses denote appearances as starter.
Numbers in parentheses denote appearances as substitute.

Players with no appearances are not included on the list, italics indicate a loaned in player

As of match played

No.	Nat.	Player	Regular Season	Total
Goalkeepers
1	(United States)	Breanna Norris	0	0
25	(United States)	Nicolette Pasquarella	0	0
30	(United States)	Kelsey Daugherty	0	0
Defenders
2	(United States)	Samantha Rosette	0	0
5	(South Korea)	Shin Na-yeong	0	0
16	(United States)	Jordan Thompson	0	0
17	(United States)	Leah Scarpelli	0	0
22	(United States)	Lauren Gogal	0	0
23	(United States)	Alice Barbieri	0	0
24	(United States)	Kelsey Hill	0	0
55	(United States)	Annie Williams	0	0
Midfielders
3	(United States)	Samantha Kroeger	0	0
4	(United States)	Emma Loving	0	0
6	(Ghana)	Jennifer Cudjoe	0	0
12	(United States)	Hope Breslin	0	0
14	(Croatia)	Kiki Marković	0	0
Forwards
7	(Croatia)	Ana Maria Marković	0	0
8	(Brazil)	Mylena Freitas	0	0
9	(United States)	Jessica Garziano	0	0
10	(Republic of Ireland)	Rebecca Cooke	0	0
11	(United States)	Sofia Lewis	0	0
34	(United States)	Catherine Zimmerman	0	0
