= The Perecman Firm =

American law firm

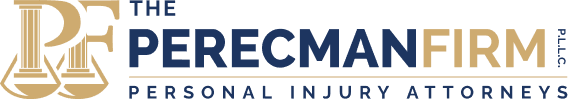
- Headquarters: New York City
- Offices: 250 West 57th Street, Suite 401, New York, NY 10107
- Major practice areas: Construction Accidents, Workers' Compensation, Premises Accidents, Vehicle Accidents, Medical Malpractice, Wrongful Death, Social Security Disability, Civil Rights, Product Liability, Serious Injuries
- Date founded: 1983
- Founder: David Perecman
- Company type: Professional Limited Liability Company
- Website: www.perecman.com

The Perecman Firm is an American law firm. It was founded in 1983 by David Perecman.^{[1]} The firm is best known for its work on injury-related cases, such as construction and vehicle accidents, personal injury, and medical malpractice.

== Notable cases ==
In 2014, The Perecman Firm represented several families in cases involving special-needs students. The firm represented the family of Avonte Oquendo, a teenage boy with autism that went missing from Center Boulevard School. The firm also represented the family of Dyasha Smith, a student that choked to death at the School for International Studies. The Perecman Firm also represented the family of Nashaly Perez Rodriguez for her disappearance from school.

In January 2015, The Perecman Firm announced the Avonte Oquendo Memorial Scholarship to support a graduating high school or college student living with autism.

Attorney David Perecman represented a construction worker who was working on a construction site in the Bronx in 2006 when a steel reinforcement bar snapped, causing him to fall more than two stories and severely injure his legs. Mr. Perecman secured a $9 million+ settlement for his client.

The Perecman Firm represented the family of an infant who suffered serious brain damage in 1993. Doctors and medical staff took too long to perform a Caesarean delivery after it was discovered that the infant was suffering from fetal distress, and a CT scan revealed that the child had suffered cerebral and subdural hemorrhages. Attorneys secured a $40 million settlement for the family.

Attorney David Perecman represented a sheet metal worker who was seriously injured after the ladder he was standing on was kicked out from underneath him. After the company refused to settle the case for $10 million, the jury awarded the injured worker $15.2 million.

The Perecman Firm Represented an asbestos-abatement specialist who was seriously injured after falling off a suspended scaffold. He was neither provided with a safe method of descending to the ground nor the safety equipment necessary to make that descent, requirements of Labor Law 240(1). The jury awarded the injured worker with an $11,899,468 verdict.

== Recognition ==
In 2011, New York Magazine named The Perecman Firm on its list of Top New York area attorneys. The firm was ranked as one of the "Best Law Firms" by the 2016 U.S. News & World Report. The Perecman Firm was recognized on the New York Law Journal's "Top Settlements New York 2014" with the second largest settlement in the state.

The New York City FC partnered with the firm in May 2025, making the firm an official partner of the club.
