= Sophine Kevorkian =

Armenian footballer (born 2004)

Personal information
- Date of birth: 1 March 2004 (age 22)
- Height: 1.70 m (5 ft 7 in)
- Position: Goalkeeper

Team information
- Current team: Brooklyn FC
- Number: 00

Youth career
- Albion SC

College career
Years	Team	Apps	(Gls)
2022–2023	San Diego Toreros	27	(0)
2024–2025	LSU Tigers	17	(0)

Senior career*
Years	Team	Apps	(Gls)
2026–	Brooklyn FC	0	(0)

International career^{‡}
2025–	Armenia	6	(0)
Modeling information
Height	170 cm (5 ft 7 in)
Hair color	Blonde
Eye color	Green
Agency	Wilhelmina Models
- * Club domestic league appearances and goals as of 7 October 2026 ‡ National team caps and goals as of 6 October 2026

Sophine Kevorkian (born 1 March 2004) is a professional footballer who plays as a goalkeeper for USL Super League club Brooklyn FC. Born in the United States, she plays for the Armenia national team. Kevorkian played college soccer for the San Diego Toreros and the LSU Tigers.

== Early life ==
Kevorkian grew up in San Diego, California. Her journey through club soccer, which included a 2017 United States Youth Soccer Association national championship, ended at Albion SC, where she earned the WPSL ASC San Diego Goalkeeper Award in 2021. Kevorkian was a dual-sport athlete La Jolla High School, participating in both soccer and volleyball. With the soccer team, she contributed to a California Interscholastic Federation final appearance and was named first-team all-conference in the process.

== College career ==
=== San Diego Toreros ===
Kevorkian attended college locally at the University of San Diego. As freshman with the Toreros, she was a starter in all but one of San Diego's 19 fixtures. She broke the program's single-season saves record, with 96. On 19 October 2022, she made 11 saves in a career-high match against Santa Clara. The following year, Kevorkian topped both of her career records. She posted 97 saves, 14 of which came in a game against Cal State Fullerton in September 2023. Kevorkian totaled 27 appearances in her two seasons at USD.

=== LSU Tigers ===
In the spring of 2024, Kevorkian transferred to Louisiana State University. On October 24, 2024, she made 9 saves against Vanderbilt in her debut for the Tigers en route to a clean sheet. She also lead LSU's defensive unit to another shutout against Missouri the following match to help Louisiana State secure a spot in the SEC tournament. She totaled 4 appearances in her first season in Baton Rouge. As a senior, Kevorkian split time in net with Icelandic international Auður Sveinbjörnsdóttir Scheving. She played in 13 matches and helped the Tigers reach the Sweet 16 of the NCAA tournament for the first time in history. She was not called on to play in LSU's SEC tournament final loss to Vanderbilt, and made only one appearance in NCAA play.

== Club career ==
On 6 October 2026, USL Super League club Brooklyn FC announced the signing of Kevorkian to her first professional contract.

== International career ==
In January 2023, Kevorkian received her first call-up to the Armenia national team. Her trip to Armenia for national team camp marked the first time that either herself or anyone in her immediate family traveled to the country. She made her senior international debut in February 2025.

== Personal life ==
Multiple of Kevorkian's family members were also collegiate athletes. Her father, Masis, played water polo at Villanova University. Her uncle, Aram, was a competitive swimmer at the University of Texas; another one of her uncles, Haik, played American football at the University of Arizona.

Kevorkian is also a model. She is represented by the Los Angeles division of Wilhelmina Models.
