= Breanna Norris =

Mexican-American soccer player (born 2003)

Bre Norris
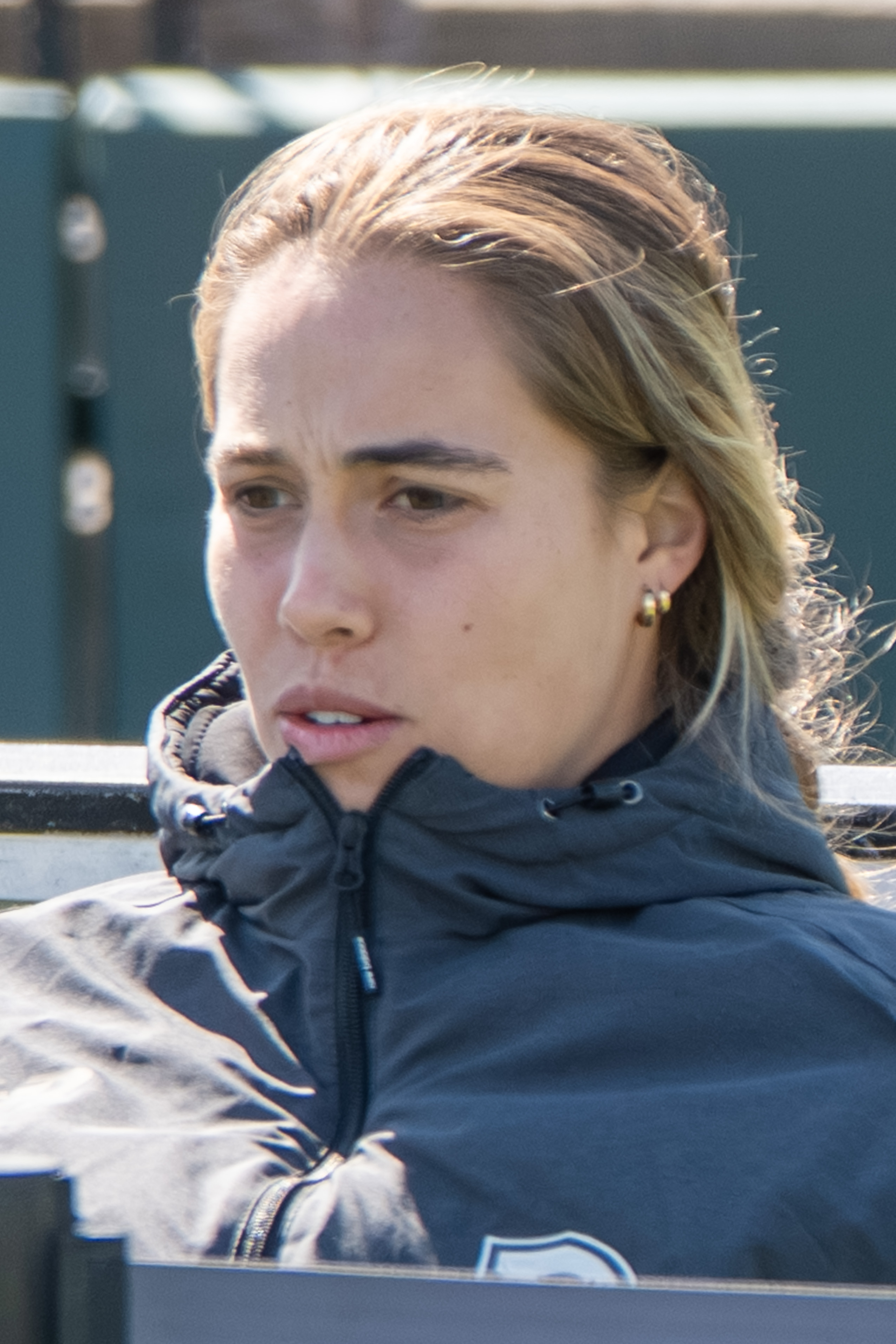
- Norris with Brooklyn FC in 2026

Personal information
- Full name: Breanna Tory Norris
- Date of birth: 28 May 2003 (age 23)
- Place of birth: Boise, Idaho, United States
- Height: 5 ft 10 in (1.78 m)
- Position: Goalkeeper

Team information
- Current team: Brooklyn FC
- Number: 1

College career
Years	Team	Apps	(Gls)
2021–2024	Portland Pilots	73	(0)

Senior career*
Years	Team	Apps	(Gls)
2025	Angel City	0	(0)
2025–	Brooklyn FC	10	(0)
- * Club domestic league appearances and goals as of 20:05, May 17, 2026 (UTC)

Breanna Tory Norris (born 28 May 2003) is a professional soccer player who plays as a goalkeeper for USL Super League club Brooklyn FC. She played college soccer for the Portland Pilots.

== Early life ==
Norris was born in Boise, Idaho, to Troy Norris and Melissa Rios Meyers. She began playing soccer as a five-year-old striker before converting to goalkeeper at age nine. She attended Boise High School, helping the soccer team to two state runner-up finishes and earning all-state honors. She played club soccer for Indie Chicas before joining the OL Reign Academy. She committed to play college soccer for the Portland Pilots as a sophomore.

== College career ==
Norris started all 17 games for the Portland Pilots in her freshman season in 2021, keeping 8 clean sheets and earning West Coast Conference (WCC) all-freshman honors. She kept 11 clean sheets in 20 games in her sophomore season in 2022, earning second-team All-WCC honors. She had a breakout junior season in 2023, allowing just 9 goals in 17 games and posting 11 clean sheets. She was named first-team All-WCC and became the first Pilot to be named WCC Goalkeeper of the Year. Bre was named to the prestigious 2024 Mac Hermann Trophy watchlist her senior year by the United Soccer Coaches Association She then repeated as first-team All-WCC and WCC Goalkeeper of the Year as a senior in 2024, after leading the league in saves and keeping 6 shutouts in 19 games.

== Club career ==
=== Angel City ===
Norris was invited to train with Angel City FC as a non-roster trialist in the 2025 preseason. Angel City announced that they had signed Norris to her first professional contract on March 12, 2025, on a roster relief contract through June. Norris and Hannah Johnson trialist contracts ended July 1, 2025.

=== Brooklyn FC ===
On July 11, 2025, Norris signed a contract with USL Super League club Brooklyn FC. She made her professional debut with Brooklyn in their opening day 2–1 win over the Tampa Bay Sun on August 23. She made 10 appearances in her first season (amidst the first of a couple of injuries in her young career) with Brooklyn FC, Bre’s goalkeeper teammate stepped in, Kelsey Daugherty.

Ahead of the 2026 season, Norris was selected as Brooklyn FC team captain.

== International career ==
Norris was called up to train with the Mexico under-23 team in May 2025.

== Career statistics ==
As of May 17, 2026

Appearances and goals by club, season and competition
Club	Season	League			Cup (Note: Includes the NWSL Challenge Cup)		Playoffs (Note: Includes NWSL playoffs and USL Super League playoffs.)		Total	
Club	Season	Division	Apps	Goals	Apps	Goals	Apps	Goals	Apps	Goals
Angel City FC	2025	NWSL	0	0	—		—		0	0
Brooklyn FC	2025–26	USL Super League	10	0	—		—		10	0
Career total			10	0	0	0	0	0	10	0
