= Hope Breslin =

American soccer player (born 1999)

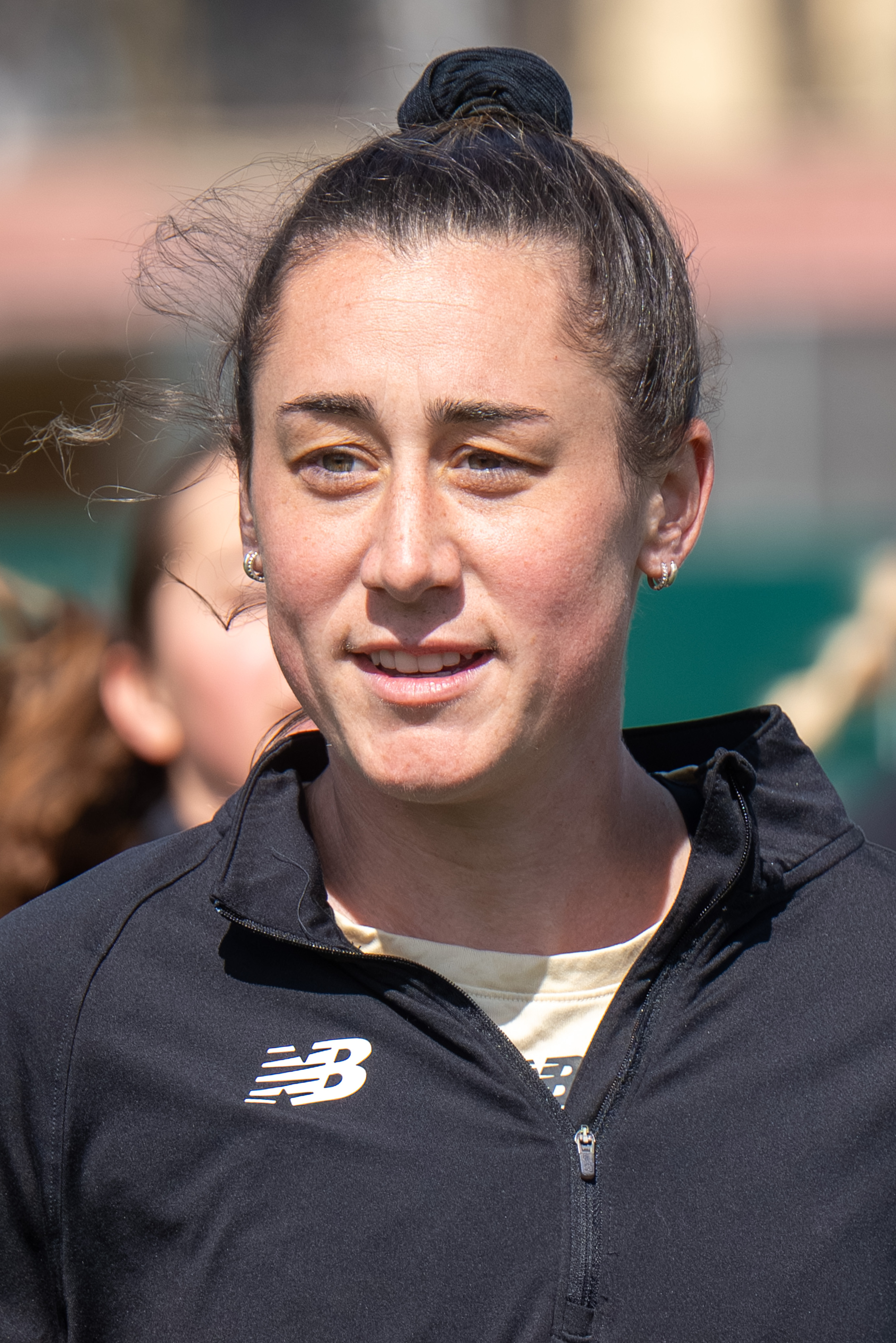
- Breslin with Brooklyn FC in 2026

Personal information
- Full name: Hope Elizabeth Breslin
- Date of birth: March 10, 1999 (age 27)
- Place of birth: Massapequa, New York
- Height: 5 ft 6 in (1.68 m)
- Position: Midfielder

Team information
- Current team: Sparta Prague
- Number: 6

College career
Years	Team	Apps	(Gls)
2017–2021	Illinois Fighting Illini	76	(18)

Senior career*
Years	Team	Apps	(Gls)
2022	Angel City FC	8	(0)
2023	Houston Dash	0	(0)
2023–2024	Wellington Phoenix	22	(2)
2024–2026	Brooklyn FC	51	(4)
2026–	Sparta Prague	1	(1)
- * Club domestic league appearances and goals as of 20:13, May 17, 2026 (UTC)

Hope Elizabeth Breslin (born March 10, 1999) is an American soccer player who plays as a midfielder for Czech Women's First League club Sparta Prague. She played college soccer for the Illinois Fighting Illini before being selected by Angel City FC in the 2022 NWSL Draft.

== Early life ==
Breslin is a native of Massapequa, New York. She attended Massapequa High School where she would help lead the team to three state national championships. She earned New York State Gatorade Player of the Year award twice.

== College career ==
She attended the University of Illinois where she was regarded as one of the soccer team's most important players. In 2018, Breslin scored an equalizer goal at the 2018 Big Ten women's soccer tournament that helped send Illinois to their first semifinal appearance since 2012.

During the summer of 2021, Breslin played for the NJ/NY Gotham FC reserves.

== Club career ==
Breslin was drafted by Angel City FC in the 2022 NWSL Draft, making her just the third player in Illinois program history to be drafted. She was the team's first ever pick, selected 28th overall. She signed a one year contract with the team for their inaugural season.

After her contract expired with Angel City, Breslin joined the Houston Dash on a national team replacement contract during the 2023 FIFA Women's World Cup.

Breslin joined New Zealand side Wellington Phoenix in fall 2023 as the team's first Visa signing. She was the only member of the team to appear in all 22 matches for the Phoenix for the season.

In June 2024, Breslin announced she would depart the Wellington Phoenix to explore other opportunities. The following month, it was announced that Breslin signed for USL Super League club Brooklyn FC. She went on to spend two seasons in Brooklyn before departing from the club in July 2026. In the 2025–26 season, she recorded over 2,000 minutes and earned one USL Super League Team of the Month honor.

On 13 August 2026, Breslin signed a contract with Czech Women's First League club Sparta Prague. She made her league debut for the club on 15 August 2026 appearing as a substitute in a 4–0 home win against Prague Raptors, scoring Sparta's fourth goal.

== Career statistics ==
=== College ===
College	Regular Season				Big 10 Tournament		Total	
College	Conference	Season	Apps	Goals	Apps	Goals	Apps	Goals
Illinois Fighting Illini	Big 10	2017	12	0	—		12	0
Illinois Fighting Illini	Big 10	2018	17	4	2	1	19	5
Illinois Fighting Illini	Big 10	2019	18	6	—		18	6
Illinois Fighting Illini	Big 10	2020	11	0	—		11	0
Illinois Fighting Illini	Big 10	2021	16	7	—		16	7
Career total			74	17	2	1	76	18

=== Club ===
As of February 18, 2025

Club	Season	League			NWSL Challenge Cup		Total	
Club	Season	Division	Apps	Goals	Apps	Goals	Apps	Goals
Angel City FC	2022	NWSL	8	0	5	0	13	0
Houston Dash	2023	NWSL	0	0	1	0	1	0
Wellington Phoenix FC	2023–24	A-League	22	2	–		22	2
Brooklyn FC	2024–25	USL Super League	12	0	–		12	0
Career total			42	2	6	0	48	2
