= Alice Barbieri =

American soccer player (born 2003)

Personal information
- Date of birth: October 29, 2003 (age 23)
- Place of birth: San Jose, California, U.S.
- Height: 5 ft 10 in (1.78 m)
- Positions: Defender; midfielder

Youth career
- MVLA SC

College career
| Years | Team | Apps | (Gls) |
| 2021–2023 | Oregon Ducks | 55 | (2) |
| 2024 | UCLA Bruins | 17 | (0) |

Senior career*
| Years | Team | Apps | (Gls) |
| 2023 | San Francisco Glens | | |
| 2025 | Sampdoria | 8 | (0) |
| 2025–2026 | Brooklyn FC | 9 | (0) |
- * Club domestic league appearances and goals as of 20:17, May 17, 2026 (UTC)

Alice Barbieri (born October 29, 2003) is an American professional soccer player who plays as a defender or midfielder. She played college soccer for the Oregon Ducks and UCLA Bruins before starting her professional career with Italian club Sampdoria and USL Super League club Brooklyn FC. She has been called up to represent Italy at the youth international level.

== Early life ==
Barbieri was born in San Jose, California, to parents Arianna Caliari and Alessandro Barbieri. She played youth soccer for Mountain View Los Altos (MVLA) SC, where she was second on her team in goals and leader in assists. Barbieri attended Leigh High School, where she helped the school's soccer team earn a conference title and advance to a state championship game. On the way to the final, Barbieri converted in two penalty shootouts and also scored a goal in the first round of the tournament. She earned all-district honors in two out of her four years of high school soccer.

== College career ==
=== Oregon Ducks ===
Barbieri toured the University of Oregon as a junior in high school, less than 24 hours after learning of her mother's breast cancer diagnosis. Following her visit to Oregon, Barbieri quickly committed to the program and cancelled all other of her recruiting trips. Two years later, she stepped out on the field for the Ducks as a freshman and became the only first-year player that season to appear in all 19 of Oregon's games. On September 29, 2022, she scored her first college goal, netting against her future team UCLA to help the Ducks attempt to upset the top-ranked program in the nation. Then, on November 7, 2022, Barbieri scored an 83rd-minute equalizer against rivals Oregon State to salvage a draw for the Ducks in their final match of the season.

In the spring before her junior year of college, Barbieri played a season with the San Francisco Glens of the pre-professional USL W League. She then returned to Oregon and posted a final season in which she led the team in assists, two of which came in a single match against Washington State.

=== UCLA Bruins ===
Barbieri transferred to the University of California, Los Angeles ahead of her senior year of college. She debuted for the Bruins on August 11, 2024, participating in UCLA's first-ever match as a member of the Big Ten Conference. During the match, she assisted Nicki Fraser to cap off a 3–0 victory over Loyola Marymount. Barbieri went on to make 17 appearances (9 starts) for the Bruins, accruing a total of 711 minutes. She helped UCLA win the 2024 Big Ten women's soccer tournament and qualify for the 2024 NCAA tournament. In both of the Bruins' NCAA matches, Barbieri participated as a substitute.

== Club career ==
On February 5, 2025, Barbieri signed her first professional contract with Italian club Sampdoria, inking a six-month deal with an option for an additional year. With both of her parents having moved to the United States from Italy, this move marked a return to roots for Barbieri. She made 8 appearances for the club, none of which were victories, as Sampdoria succumbed to relegation to the Serie B. Upon the expiration of her contract, Barbieri departed from Sampdoria.

Barbieri returned stateside in July 2025, signing with USL Super League club Brooklyn FC ahead of the Super League's second season in existence. She made her Brooklyn FC debut on August 23, 2025, playing all 90 minutes of the club's season-opening victory over reigning champions Tampa Bay Sun FC. After making 8 straight starts to kick off the season, Barbieri picked up an injury that sidelined her for the majority of the campaign. She returned to the field in Brooklyn's season finale, coming on as a second-half substitute in a defeat to the Spokane Zephyr on May 16, 2026. In July 2026, Barbieri's departure from Brooklyn was announced.

== International career ==
Both of Barbieri's parents hail from the Italian city of Mantua, rendering Barbieri eligible to represent either Italy or the United States internationally. She received her first call-up to the Italian youth national team system in May 2025, joining the under-23s for a series of friendlies against Sweden. However, she later had to withdraw from the squad before either match occurred.

== Coaching career ==
In 2026, Barbieri began working as a volunteer assistant coach for the Menlo Oaks.

== Personal life ==
Barbieri and Colin Giffen announced their engagement on June 14, 2025.

== Career statistics ==
=== Club ===
As of May 18, 2026

Appearances and goals by club, season and competition
| Club | Season | League | | | Cup | | Total | |
| Club | Season | Division | Apps | Goals | Apps | Goals | Apps | Goals |
|---|---|---|---|---|---|---|---|---|
| Sampdoria | 2024–25 | Serie A | 8 | 0 | — | | 8 | 0 |
| Brooklyn FC | 2025–26 | USL Super League | 9 | 0 | — | | 9 | 0 |
| Career total | | | 17 | 0 | 0 | 0 | 16 | 0 |
