= Ana Maria Marković =

Croatian footballer (born 1999)

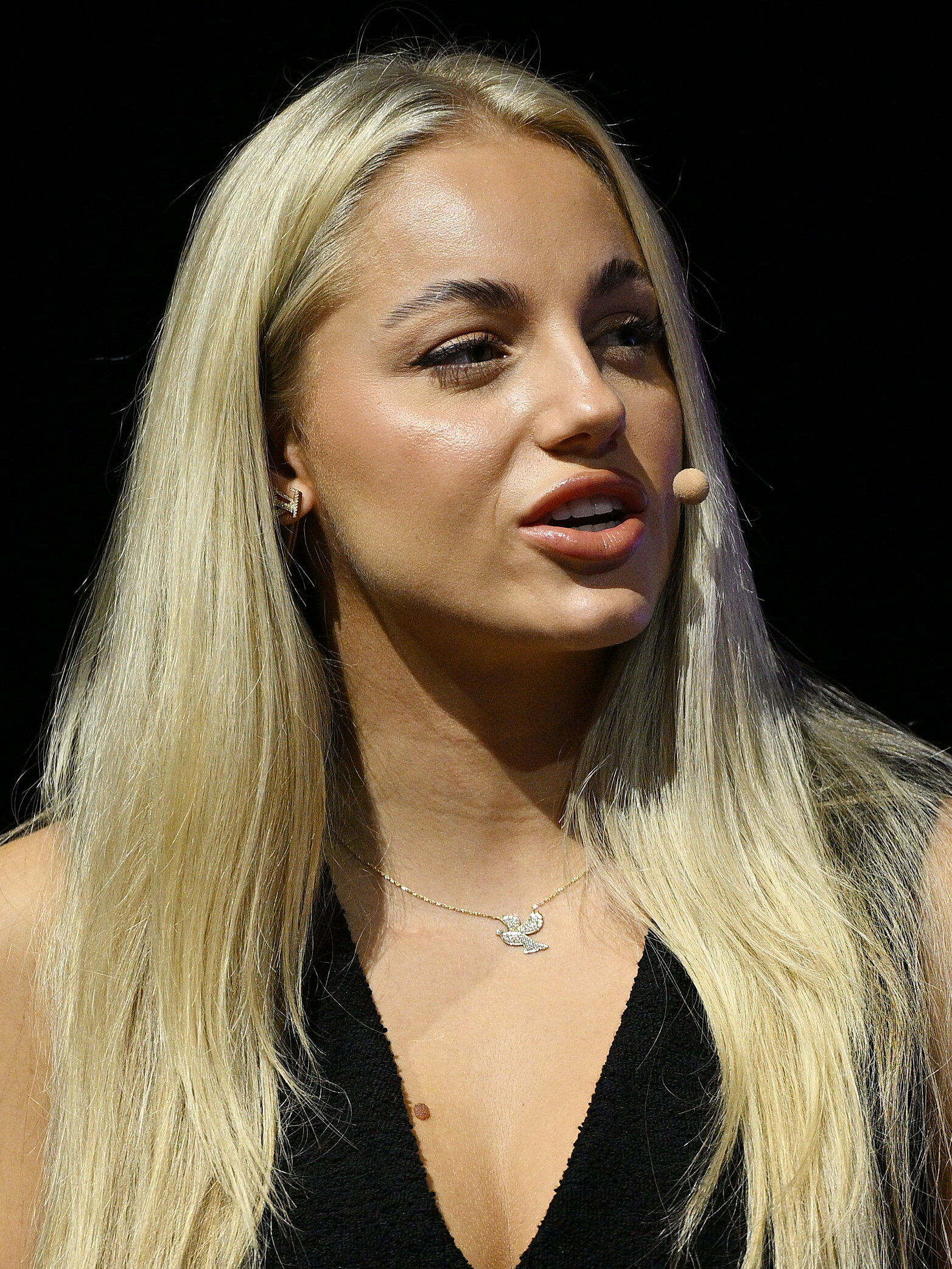
- Marković in 2023

Personal information
- Date of birth: 9 November 1999 (age 27)
- Place of birth: Zurich, Switzerland
- Height: 1.66 m (5 ft 5 in)
- Position: Forward

Team information
- Current team: Hajduk
- Number: 23

Senior career*
Years	Team	Apps	(Gls)
2017–2019	FC Zürich	0	(0)
2017–2019	→ FC Zürich U21	27	(7)
2020–2024	Grasshoppers	57	(4)
2024–2025	Braga	3	(0)
2025	Damaiense	7	(0)
2025–2026	Brooklyn FC	23	(0)
2026–	Hajduk	0	(0)

International career^{‡}
2021–	Croatia	21	(2)
- * Club domestic league appearances and goals as of 17 May 2026 ‡ National team caps and goals as of 31 August 2025

Ana Maria Marković (born 9 November 1999) is a Croatian professional footballer who plays as a forward for Croatian Women's First Football League club ŽNK Hajduk and the Croatia national team.

== Early life ==
Marković was born in the canton of Zürich, Switzerland to Croat parents who come from Split.

== Club career ==
Aged 14, Marković began playing football in Switzerland; she stated that she began playing after feeling motivated from the growth of women's football. While in Switzerland she featured for U21 squad at FC Zurich for three seasons before making the move to Grasshoppers.

In the game against her former club FC Zürich on 4 March 2023, Marković suffered a torn ACL and torn meniscus.

On 9 August 2024, she signed for Portuguese club Braga. However, she left the club in February 2025. Afterwards she signed for Damaiense.

Both Marković and her sister, Kiki, signed for American USL Super League team Brooklyn FC on 15 August 2025. Marković debuted for the club on 23 August, coming on as a second-half substitute for Catherine Zimmerman in Brooklyn's opening-day victory over Tampa Bay Sun FC. She made 23 appearances for the club before departing from Brooklyn after one season.

On 21 July 2026, Marković was announced at ŽNK Hajduk.

== International career ==
Having caught the eye of the Croatian Football Federation while playing for Grasshopper in Switzerland, Marković has been called up to play for the Croatia national team. She scored her first international goal in the 2023 World Cup qualifier against Moldova.

== Personal life ==
As of 2022, Marković did not have the Swiss citizenship despite being born in Switzerland.

She is the sister of Kiki Marković, who plays for Brooklyn FC.

== Career statistics ==
=== Club ===
As of 31 August 2025

Appearances and goals by club, season and competition
Club	Season	League			Play-offs		National cup (Note: Includes Swiss Women's Cup and Taça de Portugal)		League cup (Note: Includes Taça da Liga)		Total	
Club	Season	Division	Apps	Goals	Apps	Goals	Apps	Goals	Apps	Goals	Apps	Goals
FC Zürich Frauen U21	2017–18	Nationalliga B	4	3	—		—		—		4	3
FC Zürich Frauen U21	2018–19	Nationalliga B	12	2	—		—		—		12	2
FC Zürich Frauen U21	2019–20	Nationalliga B	11	2	—		—		—		11	2
FC Zürich Frauen U21	Total		27	7	0	0	0	0	0	0	27	7
Grasshopper	2020–21	Swiss WSL	25	2	—		5	6	—		30	8
Grasshopper	2021–22	Swiss WSL	15	1	4	0	6	6	—		25	7
Grasshopper	2022–23	Swiss WSL	12	1	0	0	4	1	—		16	2
Grasshopper	2023–24	Swiss WSL	5	0	2	0	0	0	—		7	0
Grasshopper	Total		57	4	6	0	15	13	0	0	78	17
Braga	2024–25	Campeonato Nacional Feminino	3	0	—		1	0	0	0	4	0
Damaiense	2024–25	Campeonato Nacional Feminino	7	0	—		2	0	1	0	10	0
Brooklyn FC	2025–26	USL Super League	2	0	—		—		—		2	0
Career total			96	11	6	0	18	13	1	0	121	24

=== International ===
List of international goals scored by Ana Maria Marković
No.	Date	Venue	Opponent	Score	Result	Competition
1	30 November 2021	Stadion Aldo Drosina, Pula, Croatia	Moldova	1–0	4–0	2023 FIFA Women's World Cup qualification
2	4 June 2024	Stadion Branko Čavlović-Čavlek, Karlovac, Croatia	Kosovo	2–0	2–0	UEFA Women's Euro 2025 qualifying

== Honours ==
Grasshoppers

- Swiss Cup: 2021–22 finalist
