= Mylena Freitas =

Brazilian footballer (born 2000)

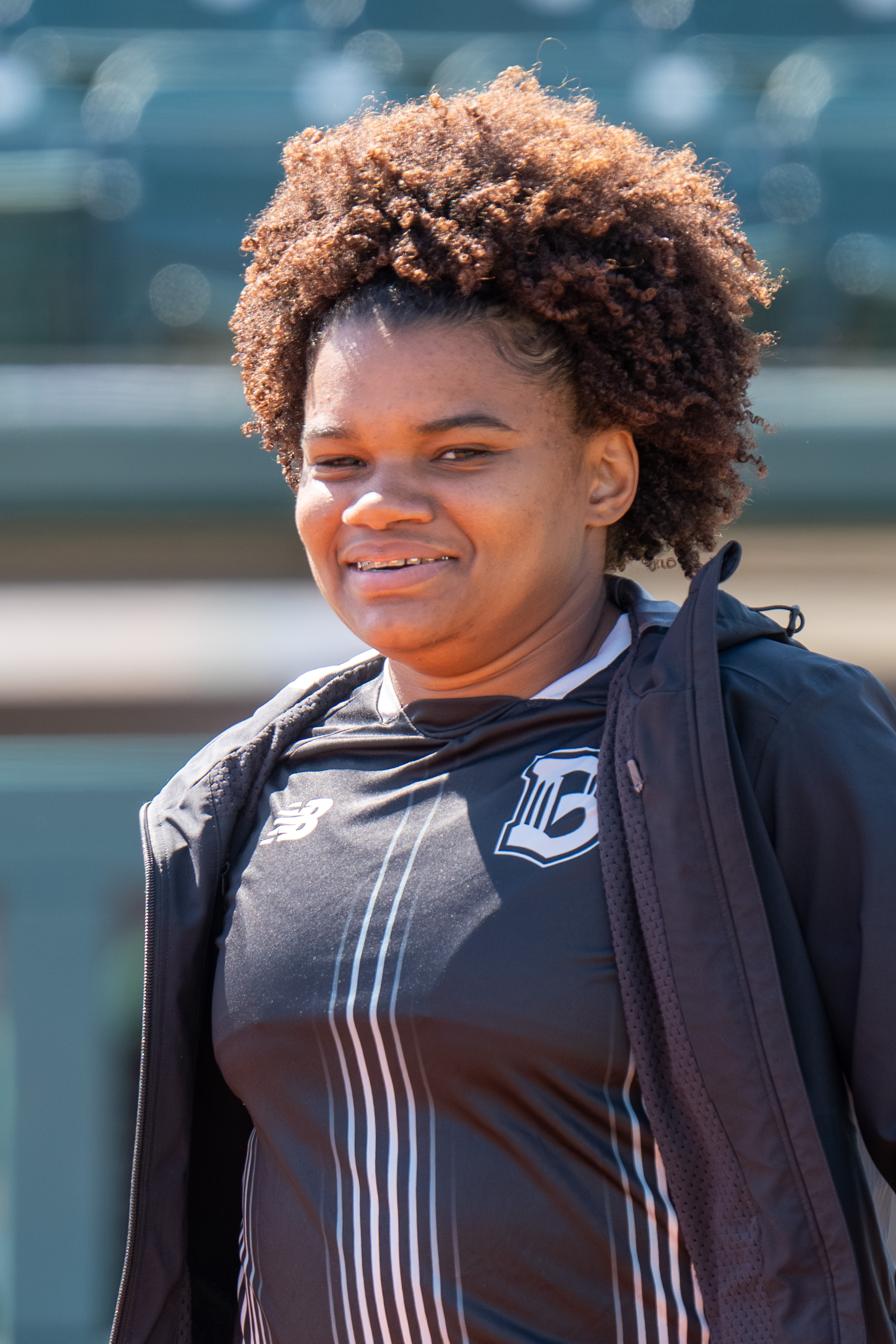
- Freitas with Brooklyn FC in 2026

Personal information
- Full name: Mylena Cruz Freitas dos Santos
- Date of birth: 29 December 2000 (age 25)
- Place of birth: Rio de Janeiro, Brazil
- Height: 1.60 m (5 ft 3 in)
- Positions: Forward; midfielder

Team information
- Current team: FC Porto

Youth career
- Vasco da Gama

Senior career*
Years	Team	Apps	(Gls)
2017–2018	Vasco da Gama	3+	(5+)
2019–2020	Avaí	20	(1)
2020–2021	Famalicão	–	(9)
2021	Shanghai Shengli	–	(–)
2022	Corinthians	21	(1)
2023	Famalicão	9	(0)
2023–2025	Braga	16	(3)
2025–2026	Brooklyn FC	19	(1)
2026–	FC Porto	0	(0)

International career
2019–2020	Brazil U20		
- * Club domestic league appearances and goals as of 20:12, 17 May 2026 (UTC)

Mylena Cruz Freitas dos Santos (born 29 December 2000) is a Brazilian professional footballer who plays as a forward or midfielder for Campeonato Nacional Feminino club FC Porto. She has previously played in Brazil for clubs Vasco, Avaí, and Corinthians, in Portugal for clubs Famalicão and Braga, in China for Shanghai Shengli, and in the United States for USL Super League club Brooklyn FC. She has represented Brazil at the youth international level.

== Club career ==
Freitas was born and raised in Rio de Janeiro. She started her career with CR Vasco da Gama and was promoted to the club's first team in 2017. The following year, she scored 5 goals in 3 appearances. She departed from Vasco having contributed to titles in the Campeonato Carioca and the Brasileiro de Baixada.

At age 18, Freitas moved to Caçador to play for Avaí FC. She won a state championship with Avaí in her first year with the team.

In her first time playing abroad, Freitas spent the 2020–21 Campeonato Nacional Femenino with Portuguese club Famalicão. She scored 9 times across the season, leading the team. 5 of her goals came in a single game in February 2021, a victory over Torreense.

Later in 2021, Famalicão transferred Freitas to Chinese Women's Super League club Shanghai Shengli in exchange for €50,000, with the fee potentially reaching €100,000 depending on Freitas' performances. The transfer fee set a record for the largest in Portuguese women's football history. However, Freitas found her season in China to be personally challenging, and she returned back home to Brazil the following year.

Freitas was announced to have signed for Corinthians in January 2022. She made her club debut on 5 March 2022, starting in a 2–1 victory over Red Bull Bragantino. After finding difficulty adapting to Corinthians' style of play, Freitas terminated her contract early. She played her final match for the club on 27 September after having participated in 21 matches across the season.

In July 2023, Freitas moved back to Portugal. She signed for Braga, the rivals of her former club Famalicão. In her Braga debut, she scored in a 7–0 win over Rio Ave to guarantee Braga passage to the fourth round of the Taça de Portugal. Over two seasons with the team, she registered 3 goals and 3 assists in 16 appearances.

On 25 August 2025, Freitas was announced to have signed in the United States for USL Super League club Brooklyn FC. She debuted for Brooklyn five days later, participating in a defeat to the Dallas Trinity. On 14 February 2026, Freitas scored her first USL Super League goal less than two minutes after entering an eventual 3–3 draw with Fort Lauderdale United FC as a substitute. She totaled 19 appearances (10 starts) in her lone season with Brooklyn before departing in July 2026.

Freitas returned to Portugal again in August 2026, joining newly-promoted team FC Porto.

== International career ==
Freitas received her first call-up to the Brazil under-20 national team in September 2019, ahead of a training camp at Granja Comary. The following year, she was named to the squad that competed in the 2020 South American Under-20 Women's Football Championship. Freitas has also previously trained with the Brazil senior national team.
