= Dana Scheriff =

American soccer player (born 1998)

Personal information
- Full name: Dana Joy Scheriff
- Date of birth: September 8, 1998 (age 28)
- Place of birth: Babylon, New York, US
- Height: 5 ft 7 in (1.70 m)
- Position: Forward

Team information
- Current team: Athlone Town

Youth career
- Brentwood SC

College career
Years	Team	Apps	(Gls)
2016–2019	Monmouth Hawks	78	(14)

Senior career*
Years	Team	Apps	(Gls)
2021	ÍA	18	(4)
2022–2023	Athlone Town	25	(12)
2024	FC Aarau	10	(4)
2024–2025	Brooklyn FC	22	(3)
2025	Slavia Prague	4	(0)
2026–	Athlone Town	6	(9)
- * Club domestic league appearances and goals as of 10 May 2026

Dana Joy Scheriff (born September 8, 1998) is an American soccer player who plays as a forward for Irish club Athlone Town. She played college soccer for the Monmouth Hawks before her career in Europe with teams ÍA, FC Aarau and SK Slavia Prague

== Early life ==
Scheriff attended North Babylon High School on Long Island, New York. Scheriff was the first North Babylon girls soccer player to start all four years on varsity, earning numerous accolades including all-state, league MVP, and Suffolk County Player of the Year, while setting a school record with 23 goals in her junior year and finishing her career with 38 goals and 20 assists.

== College career ==
=== Monmouth Hawks ===
Scheriff had a successful career at Monmouth University, where she was a key contributor to four MAAC Championship-winning teams from 2016 to 2019. She earned numerous accolades, including the 2019-20 Female Joan Martin Award and multiple All-MAAC selections, while amassing 14 goals and 10 assists in her collegiate career. Known for her leadership on and off the field, she was a three-time MAAC All-Academic Team member.

== Career ==
=== ÍA ===
Scheriff had a short but successful stint with Icelandic side ÍA in 2021.

=== Athlone Town ===
In 2022, Scheriff signed for Irish side Athlone Town. During her sixth game with he club, she suffered a season ending injury to her ankle. During the 2023 season, Scheriff capped off a successful season with Athlone Town by earning a spot on the Women’s Premier Division Team of the Year, winning the Golden Boot as the league’s top scorer, and helping her team to victories in both the FAI Women’s Cup and the President’s Cup.

=== FC Aarau ===
In 2024, she signed for Swiss side FC Aarau.

=== Brooklyn FC ===
On July 25, 2024, the USL Super League club Brooklyn FC announced that it had signed Scheriff to its inaugural roster.

=== Slavia Prague ===
On 16 July 2025, Scheriff signed a contract with Czech Women's First League club Slavia Prague.

=== Athlone Town ===
Scheriff rejoined Athlone Town ahead of the 2026 season She helped the club win the Presidents Cup in her first competitive game with the club scoring the winning goal against Shelbourne. She scored four goals in her third league game in a game against Bohemian in a 5-2 win.

== Personal life ==
Scheriff is of English descent. She had an Irish grandmother.

== Honours ==
=== Athlone Town ===
- FAI Cup: 2023
