= Emma Loving =

American soccer player (born 1998)

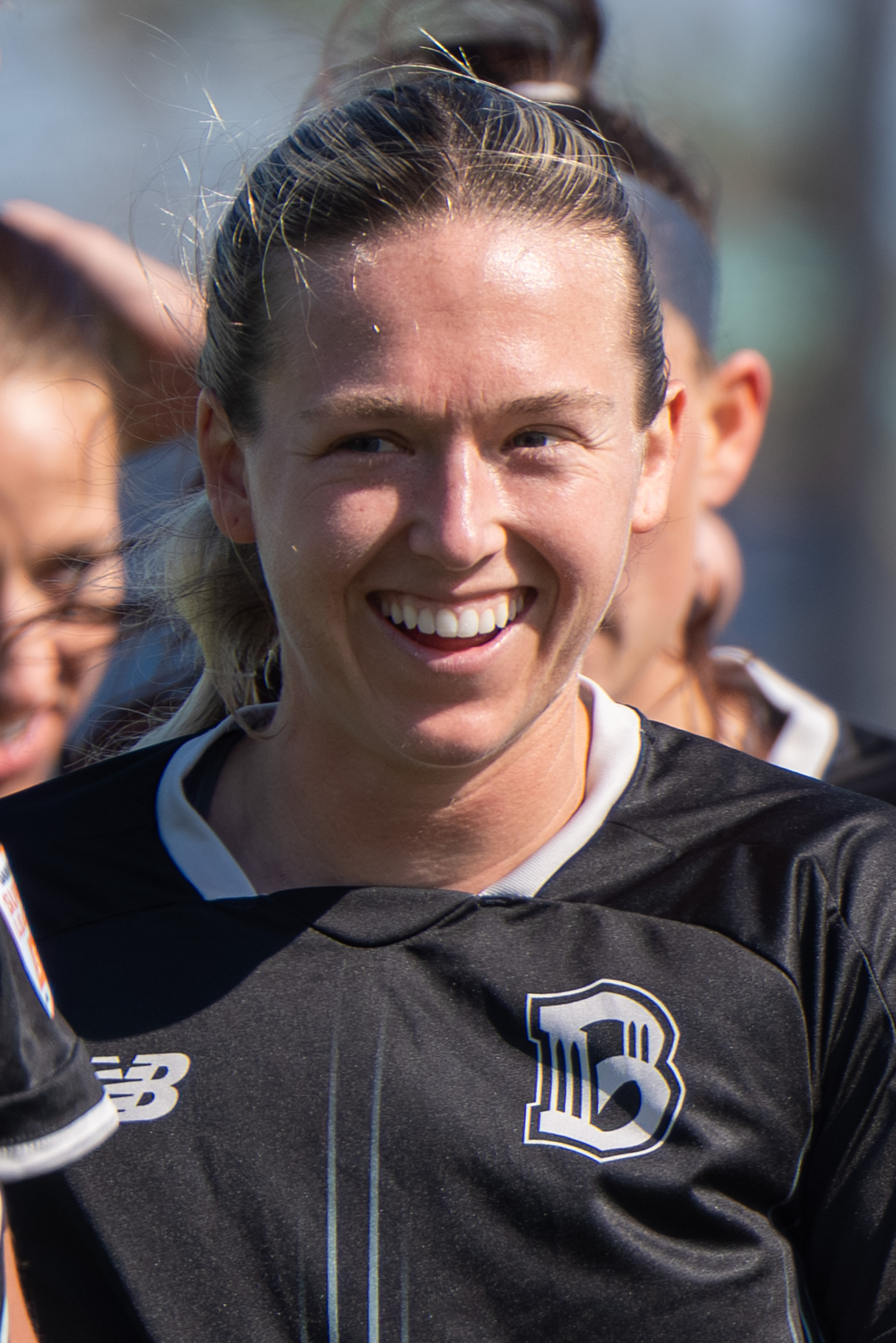
- Loving with Brooklyn FC in 2026

Personal information
- Full name: Emma Catherine Loving
- Date of birth: March 5, 1998 (age 28)
- Place of birth: Doylestown, Pennsylvania, U.S.
- Height: 5 ft 4 in (1.63 m)
- Positions: Winger; midfielder

Team information
- Current team: Brooklyn FC
- Number: 8

Youth career
- Buckingham United
- FC Bucks

College career
Years	Team	Apps	(Gls)
2016–2019	Penn Quakers	69	(10)

Senior career*
Years	Team	Apps	(Gls)
2022	Mallbackens IF	11	(2)
2022–2024	SC Sand	40	(9)
2024–2025	Strasbourg	20	(0)
2025–	Brooklyn FC	23	(1)
- * Club domestic league appearances and goals as of 20:10, May 17, 2026 (UTC)

Emma Catherine Loving (born March 5, 1998) is an American professional soccer player who plays as a winger or midfielder for USL Super League club Brooklyn FC. She played college soccer for the Penn Quakers before starting her professional career in Europe with Mallbackens IF, SC Sand, and Strasbourg.

== Early life ==
Loving was born in Doylestown, Pennsylvania, to Brian and Jennifer Loving. She originally played soccer for local club Buckingham United before switching to FC Bucks in eighth grade. Loving attended Central Bucks High School East, where she was the junior varsity team's top scorer as a freshman. She then moved up to the varsity squad, was named two-time all-state and all-region, and eventually became team captain. As a senior, Loving was named a high school All-American by the NSCAA after recording 33 goals and 11 assists. She had also helped Central Bucks East win a historic district title and reach the Pennsylvania state championship match.

== College career ==
As a high school sophomore, Loving committed to the University of Pennsylvania; she had also considered Rutgers University and the University of Virginia before ultimately choosing to play for the Penn Quakers. On September 4, 2016, she scored her first two collegiate goals in a 5–0 win over Robert Morris. Loving did not look back, scoring 4 more goals across all 16 of the Quakers' matches to become Penn's 2016 leading scorer. She subsequently earned recognition as an All-Ivy honorable mention at the end of the year.

In her sophomore season, Loving once again appeared in all 16 of Penn's matches. On September 23, 2017, she scored the lone goal in the Quakers' Ivy League-opening victory over Harvard, which was also the program's first win over the Crimson in 5 years. Her performance in the game earned her the honor of Ivy League player of the Week. Loving rounded out her college career with two more seasons, one of which included an Ivy League championship title. She made 69 total appearances for the program.

== Club career ==
Loving signed her first professional contract with Swedish second-division club Mallbackens IF in August 2022. She scored twice in her 11 Elitettan appearances, first in August against Älvsjö AIK and then three months later in a draw with Jitex BK.

On January 31, 2023, Loving signed with German team SC Sand halfway through the 2. Frauen-Bundesliga season, joining fellow American Jenna Zuniga. Across her one-and-a-half seasons with SC Sand, Loving scored 9 times across 40 league games. She also made 2 appearances in the DFB-Pokal cup, both of which occurred in the 2023–24 season.

Loving signed for newly promoted French top-flight team RC Strasbourg Alsace on July 27, 2024. Despite joining a team in a different country, Loving did not have to move particularly far, with the German town of Willstätt and the French city of Strasbourg both in close proximity to one another. Loving kicked off her stint with Strasbourg on a positive note, scoring a brace in a preseason match against FC Metz. However, she did not find the back of the net again in her time with the club. Loving helped Strasbourg finish 9th in the Première Ligue standings and evade relegation back down to the Seconde Ligue.

On July 29, 2025, Loving headed back stateside and joined USL Super League club Brooklyn FC. She made her club debut in Brooklyn's season-opening match over the Tampa Bay Sun, playing all 90 minutes of the 2–1 victory. On September 3, 2025, she scored her first goal for the club, striking from outside the box to open the scoring against Spokane Zephyr FC. Loving went on to make 23 appearances (18 starts) in her first season with Brooklyn as the club finished in 7th place, failing to qualify for the playoffs.

== Career statistics ==
=== Club ===
As of May 18, 2026

Appearances and goals by club, season and competition
Club	Season	League			Cup		Playoffs		Total	
Club	Season	Division	Apps	Goals	Apps	Goals	Apps	Goals	Apps	Goals
Mallbackens IF	2022	Elitettan	11	2	2 (Note: Appearance(s) in the Svenska Cupen)	0	—		13	2
SC Sand	2022–23	2. Frauen-Bundesliga	14	3	—		—		14	3
SC Sand	2023–24	2. Frauen-Bundesliga	26	6	2 (Note: Appearance(s) in the DFB-Pokal)	0	—		28	6
SC Sand	Total		40	9	2	0	0	0	42	9
RC Strasbourg Alsace	2024–25	Première Ligue	20	0	1 (Note: Appearance(s) in the Coupe de France)	0	—		21	0
Brooklyn FC	2025–26	USL Super League	23	1	—		—		23	1
Career total			94	12	5	0	0	0	99	12
