= Nicolette Pasquarella =

American soccer player (born 2003)

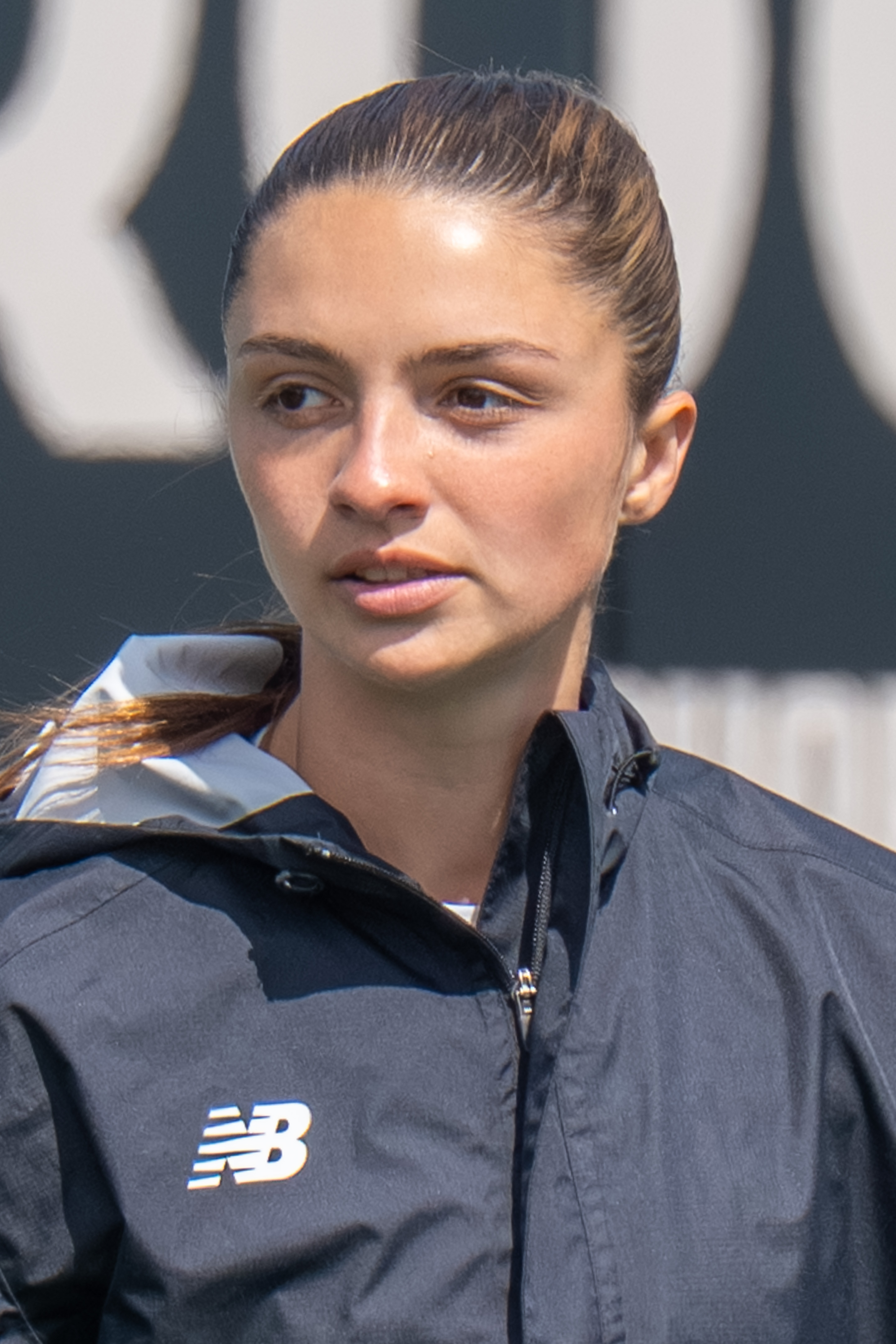
- Pasquarella with Brooklyn FC in 2026

Personal information
- Date of birth: June 16, 2003 (age 23)
- Place of birth: Ronkonkoma, New York, U.S.
- Height: 5 ft 9 in (1.75 m)
- Position: Goalkeeper

Team information
- Current team: Brooklyn FC
- Number: 25

Youth career
- NCE Soccer

College career
Years	Team	Apps	(Gls)
2021–2024	Stony Brook Seawolves	59	(0)

Senior career*
Years	Team	Apps	(Gls)
2025–	Brooklyn FC	1	(0)

Managerial career
- 2025–: St. John's Red Storm (assistant)
- * Club domestic league appearances and goals as of 18:12, April 19, 2026 (UTC)

Nicolette Pasquarella (born June 16, 2003) is an American professional soccer player who plays as a goalkeeper for Brooklyn FC in the USL Super League. She played college soccer for the Stony Brook Seawolves, where she helped the program win its first CAA Women's Soccer Championship in 2024.

== Early life ==
Pasquarella was born and raised in Ronkonkoma, New York, on Long Island. She grew up in a soccer family, with her father and grandmother both having played the sport. She began playing soccer before elementary school, initially as a forward before transitioning to goalkeeper. Alongside soccer, Pasquarella also played lacrosse, volleyball, and basketball, and was a dancer during her youth.

Pasquarella attended Connetquot High School, where she was a four-year letter winner and served one year as team captain. Her senior season was delayed by the COVID-19 pandemic, but she nevertheless dominated, conceding just two goals and earning multiple honours including Suffolk County and New York State Goalkeeper of the Year — becoming the first player in New York State to achieve Suffolk County, Long Island, and NYS Goalkeeper of the Year honours simultaneously. She also earned All-Division honours in 2019 and All-County honours in 2020.

During her junior year of high school, Pasquarella participated in the NCE Soccer Center of Excellence (COE) Program, through which she was invited to train with Manchester City and Manchester United in England. She described the Manchester experience as the best of her life.

== College career ==
Pasquarella joined Stony Brook University in 2021 to play for the Stony Brook Seawolves in NCAA Division I. In her freshman season, she made four appearances totaling 245 minutes, making her first collegiate start in a 103-scoreless-minute performance before conceding in overtime against Fairleigh Dickinson. In her sophomore year she made 16 appearances and started 13 games, saving 91 shots and recording two shutouts.

As a junior in 2023, Pasquarella played 1,451 minutes and totaled 74 saves, ranking seventh in the CAA, while posting a .787 save percentage and allowing 1.36 goals per game. Her performances that year made her one of the conference's top goalkeepers, ranking third in the CAA in saves over her junior and sophomore seasons combined with 161 saves at a 78.5% save rate.

In her senior year of 2024, Pasquarella started all 21 games, totaling 1,811 minutes, saving 84 shots, and recording seven clean sheets, while allowing 1.39 goals per game. In September 2024, she earned CAA Defensive Player of the Week honours after starting all three matches in a 3–0 week for Stony Brook, recording eight saves and playing 250 minutes without conceding a goal. Pasquarella capped her college career by making eight saves in Stony Brook's first-ever CAA Women's Soccer Championship victory over Monmouth in November 2024. Across her four-year collegiate career, she started 58 matches and recorded 17 shutouts, finishing with a 23–17–12 record and a career save percentage of .759.

== Club career ==
Following her college career, Pasquarella was invited to trial with Italian Serie A club Parma Calcio 1913 in early 2025. On August 19, 2025, she signed a rookie contract with Brooklyn FC for the 2025–26 Gainbridge Super League season, becoming the club's third goalkeeper ahead of its second season. The signing was notable for its local connection — Pasquarella grew up in Ronkonkoma, approximately 50 miles from Brooklyn. She made her professional debut on February 14, 2026, starting and playing the entirety of a 3–3 draw with Fort Lauderdale United FC.

== Coaching career ==
Alongside her playing career, Pasquarella has worked as a goalkeeper coach. She began coaching with the NCE Soccer program while still a student, creating session plans and working alongside NCE head goalkeeper coach Lee Broster. After graduating from Stony Brook, she joined St. John's University as a goalkeeper coach for the women's soccer program ahead of the 2025–26 season.

== Honors ==
Individual

- Suffolk County Goalkeeper of the Year: 2020
- New York State Goalkeeper of the Year: 2020
- CAA Defensive Player of the Week: September 2024
