= Sofia Lewis =

American soccer player (born 1998)

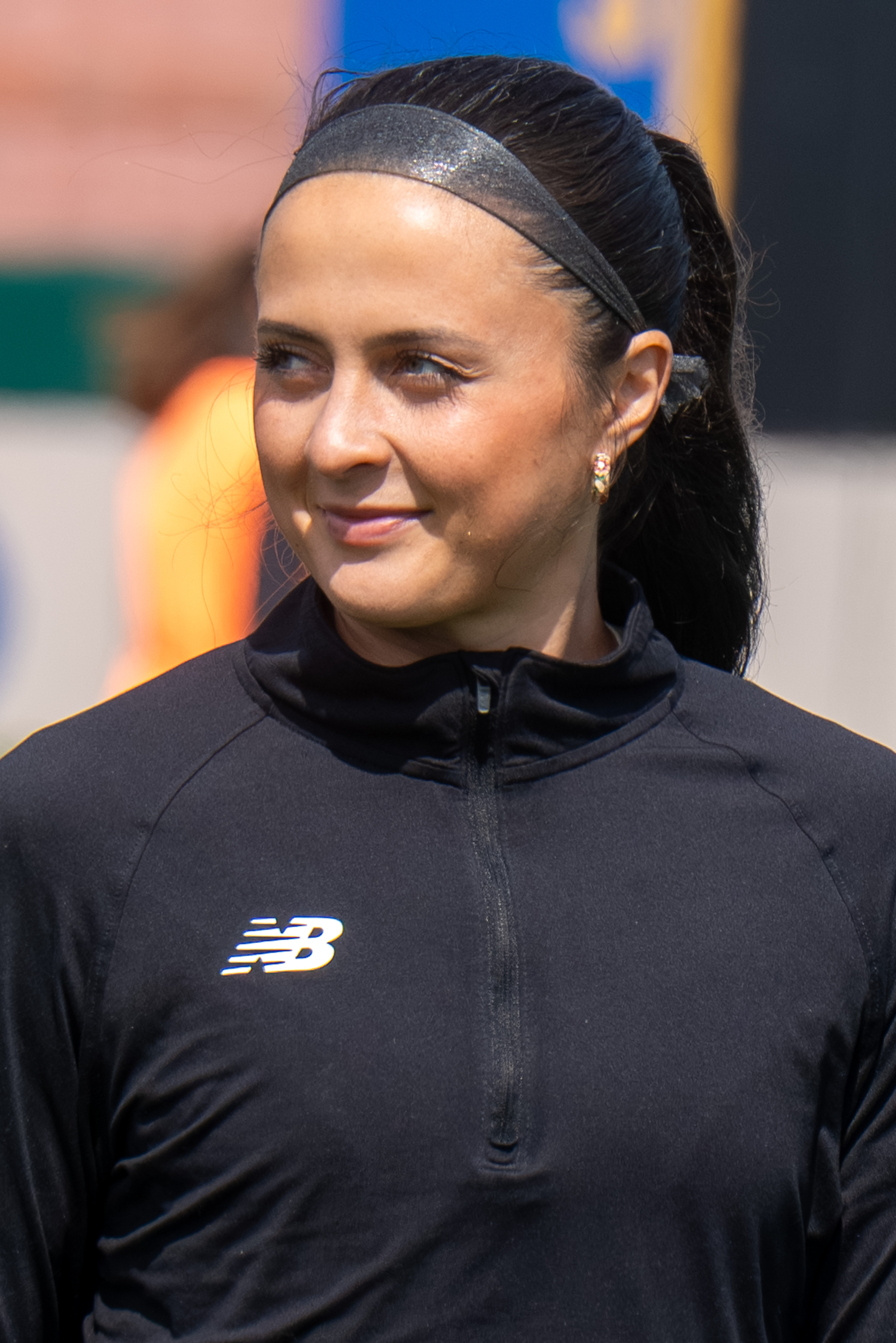
- Lewis with Brooklyn FC in 2026

Personal information
- Full name: Sofia Gisella Lewis
- Date of birth: November 25, 1998 (age 27)
- Place of birth: Florida, United States
- Height: 5 ft 6 in (1.68 m)
- Position: Forward

Team information
- Current team: Brooklyn FC
- Number: 11

College career
| Years | Team | Apps | (Gls) |
| 2017–2021 | Minot State Beavers | 86 | (51) |

Senior career*
| Years | Team | Apps | (Gls) |
| 2023 | FHL | 18 | (8) |
| 2023–2024 | Clube de Albergaria | 25 | (5) |
| 2024–2025 | Marítimo | 22 | (7) |
| 2025– | Brooklyn FC | 27 | (2) |
- * Club domestic league appearances and goals as of 20:12, May 17, 2026 (UTC)

Sofia Gisella Lewis (born November 25, 1998) is an American professional soccer player who plays as a forward for USL Super League club Brooklyn FC. She played college soccer for the Minot State Beavers before starting her professional career abroad with Icelandic club FHL and Portuguese teams Clube de Albergaria and Marítimo.

== Early life ==
Born in Florida to an Argentine mother, Lewis' family moved from Jacksonville to Minot, North Dakota, when Lewis was a child. She went on to play three years of soccer for at Minot High School, taking home all-state first team honors in each of her three seasons. In 2017, she was named the North Dakota Gatorade Player of the Year.

== College career ==
Lewis matriculated at local school Minot State University, where she played five seasons for the Beavers soccer team. She got off to a quick start, playing in all of Minot State's matches in her first three years and receiving two All-NSIC first team honors. She was ranked second in Northern Sun Intercollegiate Conference goalscoring as a freshman and third as a sophomore. On October 7, 2018, she scored her first collegiate hat-trick, helping Minot State beat Minnesota Crookston, 4–0. She received All-Central Region third team and NSIC all-tournament team awards at the end of 2018, and an All-NSIC second team award the following year.

Lewis' senior season was disrupted by the COVID-19 pandemic, which limited Minot State's schedule to nine games. Nevertheless, Lewis shined, leading the Beavers with 7 goals in 7 games. She returned to the program for a fifth year, where she posted 9 goals and 3 assists en route to her third first-team All-NSIC award. She finished her Minot State career with 51 goals, ranking fourth in the all-time NSIC goalscoring leaderboards and setting a new Minot State record for career goals scored.

== Club career ==
In 2023, Lewis moved overseas to start her professional career with Icelandic second-division club FHL. She scored her first pro goal in the opening match of the 2023 1. deild kvenna, contributing to a 2–1 victory over KR. She went on to score 8 league goals in her single season with FHL, including a game in which she recorded both a hat-trick and an assist. She also scored in the Icelandic Women's Football League Cup, helping FHL beat Íþróttafélagið Völsungur and advance to the quarterfinals of the competition. Lewis' efforts throughout the year contributed to an eighth-place league finish, fulfilling coach Björgvin Karl's goal of avoiding relegation to the 2. deild kvenna.

Lewis then moved to Portugal. She scored 5 goals in 25 appearances in the 2023–24 season for Campeonato Nacional Feminino team Clube de Albergaria before departing at the end of the season.

On August 2, 2024, she joined fellow Portuguese side Marítimo. Despite playing three fewer games, she bagged 7 goals across the season. Two of her 7 goals came in a single match against Vilaverdense in December 2024. In January 2025, she participated in Marítimo's run to the quarterfinals of the Taça de Portugal, starting in both of her team's matches against Benfica as Marítimo were beaten by the reigning champions 5–0 on aggregate.

On July 14, 2025, Lewis was announced to have signed for USL Super League club Brooklyn FC ahead of the league's second season of play. She made her Super League debut in Brooklyn's season-opening match over the Tampa Bay Sun, playing all 90 minutes of the 2–1 victory On October 18, she scored her first Brooklyn goal in a loss to the Carolina Ascent. In Brooklyn's final match of the first half of the season, Lewis scored again, netting the lone goal in a 1–0 win over the Spokane Zephyr that secured Brooklyn's third victory of the year. She was named the Super League's Impact Sub of the Month at the end of November. In the second half of the season, Lewis continued to come off the bench, appearing in all but one of her team's games. She racked up 27 total appearances as Brooklyn failed to qualify for the playoffs for the second consecutive year.

== Honors ==
Individual

- First-team All-NSIC: 2017, 2018, 2021
- Second-team All-NSIC: 2019
- NSIC tournament all-tournament team: 2018
