= Jennifer Cudjoe =

Ghanaian footballer (born 1994)

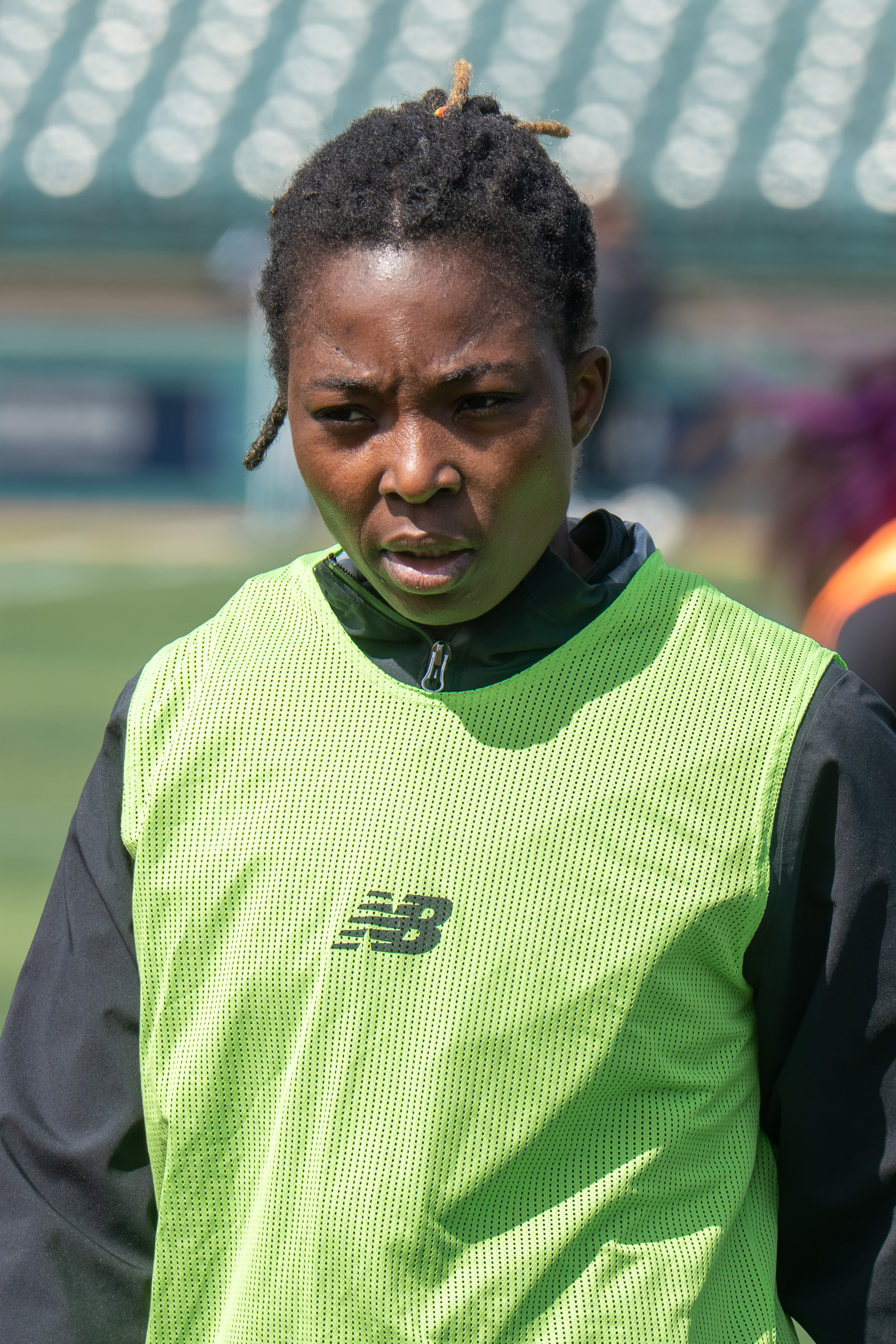
- Cudjoe with Brooklyn FC in 2026

Personal information
- Full name: Jennifer Cudjoe
- Date of birth: 7 March 1994 (age 32)
- Place of birth: Accra, Ghana
- Height: 1.63 m (5 ft 4 in)
- Position: Midfielder

Team information
- Current team: Brooklyn FC
- Number: 6

Youth career
- 2005–2012: Sekondi Hasaacas Ladies

College career
Years	Team	Apps	(Gls)
2013–2014	Northeastern Oklahoma A&M Lady Norse	22	(23)
2015	Northeastern State RiverHawks	21	(8)
2016	UMFK Bengals	18	(16)

Senior career*
Years	Team	Apps	(Gls)
2012–2014	Sekondi Hasaacas Ladies		
2017	California Storm		
2018–2019	Asheville City	13	(5)
2020	Chattanooga Lady Red Wolves	0	(0)
2020–2022	NJ/NY Gotham FC (Note: Sky Blue FC changed its name to NJ/NY Gotham FC in 2021.)	20	(0)
2023–2024	Nordsjælland	17	(0)
2024–2025	DC Power FC	18	(0)
2025–	Brooklyn FC	14	(0)

International career^{‡}
2010	Ghana U17	1	(0)
2012–2014	Ghana U20	6	(1)
2023–	Ghana	1	(0)
- * Club domestic league appearances and goals as of 17 May 2026 ‡ National team caps and goals as of 8 July 2023

Jennifer Cudjoe (born 7 March 1994) is a Ghanaian professional footballer who plays as a midfielder for USL Super League club Brooklyn FC the Ghana women's national team.

== Club career ==
Cudjoe signed a short-term contract with Sky Blue FC for the 2020 NWSL Challenge Cup. She made her NWSL debut on 30 June 2020.

Cudjoe was selected by Racing Louisville FC in the 2020 NWSL Expansion Draft, but Sky Blue soon acquired her back in a trade.

On 23 August 2024, Cudjoe signed for USL Super League team DC Power FC.

On 5 November 2025, Cudjoe joined fellow USL Super League club Brooklyn FC.

== International career ==
Cudjoe accepted her first senior team roster selection in July 2023 for the 2024 CAF Women's Olympic qualifying tournament. Ghana had previously offered Cudjoe a spot in 2021, which she declined due to concerns about the COVID-19 pandemic and that her concerns about Ghana's lack of support for the squad had not been heeded. She had previously appeared for the Ghana under-20 team at the 2014 FIFA U-20 Women's World Cup.

== Career statistics ==
=== Club ===
As of 4 May 2025

Club	Season	League			Cup (Note: Includes the NWSL Challenge Cup)		Playoffs (Note: Includes NWSL Playoffs)		Other		Total	
Club	Season	Division	Apps	Goals	Apps	Goals	Apps	Goals	Apps	Goals	Apps	Goals
NJ/NY Gotham FC	2020	NWSL	—		6	0	—		3 (Note: Includes the NWSL Fall Series)	0	9	0
NJ/NY Gotham FC	2021	NWSL	14	0	5	0	0	0	—		19	0
NJ/NY Gotham FC	2022	NWSL	6	0	2	0	—		—		8	0
NJ/NY Gotham FC	Total		20	0	13	0	0	0	3	0	36	0
FC Nordsjælland	2023–24	Danish Women's League	17	0	—		—		—		17	0
DC Power FC	2024–25	USL Super League	16	0	—		—		—		16	0
Career total			53	0	13	0	0	0	3	0	69	0

=== International goals ===
No.	Date	Venue	Opponent	Score	Result	Competition
1.	13 October 2026	Accra Sports Stadium, Accra, Ghana	Mauritius	5–0	7–0	2028 CAF Women's Olympic qualifying tournament

== Honors ==
Individual

- Ghanaian Female Footballer of the Year: 2015
