= Kelsey Daugherty =

American soccer player (born 1996)

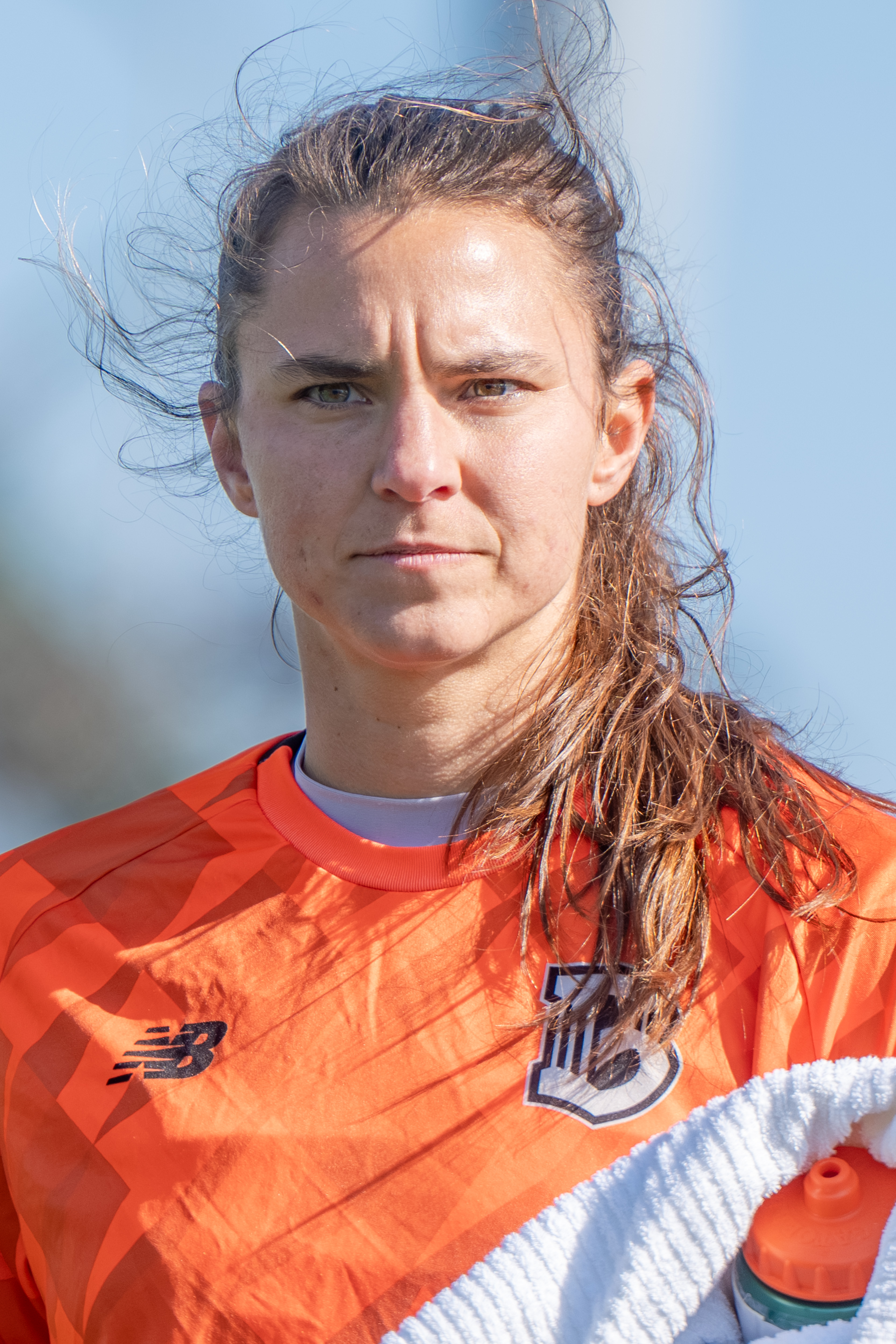
- Daugherty with Brooklyn FC in 2026

Personal information
- Full name: Kelsey Renee Daugherty
- Date of birth: December 31, 1996 (age 29)
- Place of birth: Kennesaw, Georgia, United States
- Height: 1.74 m (5 ft 9 in)
- Position: Goalkeeper

College career
Years	Team	Apps	(Gls)
2015–2018	UAB Blazers	69	(0)

Senior career*
Years	Team	Apps	(Gls)
2018	Long Island Rough Riders	10	(0)
2019–2020	Fortuna Hjørring	13	(0)
2020	Chicago Red Stars	0	(0)
2021–2022	Djurgården	35	(0)
2022–2023	Racing Louisville	0	(0)
2023	Avaldsnes	11	(0)
2023–2025	Celtic	50	(0)
2025–2026	Brooklyn FC	18	(0)
- * Club domestic league appearances and goals as of 20:17, May 17, 2026 (UTC)

Kelsey Renee Daugherty (born December 31, 1996) is an American professional soccer player who plays as a goalkeeper.

== Early life ==
Daugherty started playing in her hometown of Kennesaw, Georgia. She was part of Harrison High School's state championship-winning team in 2014.

== College career ==
As a Blazer, Daugherty racked up dozens of honors and awards, capping her career by being named Conference USA Goalkeeper of the Year. Additionally her senior year, she was named First Team All-Conference, United Soccer Coaches All-South Region First Team and Conference USA All-Academic First Team. She was named Conference USA Goalkeeper of the Week two times.

In her junior season, Daugherty was an All-Conference USA First Team and All-Academic First Team selection while being named Conference USA Goalkeeper of the Week four times. She also was named to the United Soccer Coaches All-South Region Team and a member of the United Soccer Coaches NCAA Division I Women's Scholar All-South Region Team and United Soccer Coaches NCAA Division I Women's Scholar All-America Third Team.

== Club career ==
In 2018, she played for the Long Island Rough Riders of the UWS, where she was a team Player of the Year candidate, making 41 saves over the 10-game season.

In 2019, Daugherty was eligible for the 2019 NWSL College Draft. Although Daugherty went undrafted, she received tryouts with a pair of teams: North Carolina Courage and Washington Spirit. While trialing with the Washington Spirit, Daugherty met former Wake Forest All-American Aubrey Bledsoe, who previously played with Danish club Fortuna Hjørring of the Elitedivisionen and connected her with the club, who proceeded to sign her to a contract. She got injured on the October 30, 2019, in the Round of 16 at the 2019–20 UEFA Women's Champions League against Olympique Lyonnais.

In September 2020, she joined the Chicago Red Stars of the National Women's Soccer League on a short-term contract.

In 2021, she signed with Swedish club Djurgårdens IF.

On August 15, 2022, Daugherty transferred to Racing Louisville FC of the National Women's Soccer League.

In April 2023, she joined Norwegian Toppserien club Avaldsnes IL.

In August 2023, she signed a two-year contract with Celtic of the Scottish Women's Premier League.

In July 2025, Daugherty joined Brooklyn FC of the USL Super League. She made 18 appearances in her lone season with Brooklyn before departing from the club one year later.

== Career statistics ==
As of July 14, 2025

Club	Season	League			Domestic Cup		Continental		Other		Total	
Club	Season	Division	Apps	Goals	Apps	Goals	Apps	Goals	Apps	Goals	Apps	Goals
Long Island Rough Riders	2018	United Women's Soccer	10	0	—		—		—		10	0
Fortuna Hjørring	2019–20	Kvindeliga	13 (Note: Includes Kvindeliga Championship Round matches)	0	1	0	4	0	—		18	0
Chicago Red Stars	2020	National Women's Soccer League	0	0	—		—		0	0	0	0
Djurgårdens IF	2021	Damallsvenskan	22	0	2	0	—		1 (Note: Appearance in Stockholm Challenge Cup)	0	25	0
Djurgårdens IF	2022	Damallsvenskan	13	0	0	0	—		—		13	0
Djurgårdens IF	Total		35	0	2	0	0	0	1	0	38	0
Racing Louisville FC	2022	National Women's Soccer League	0	0	—		—		0	0	0	0
Racing Louisville FC	2023	National Women's Soccer League	0	0	—		—		0	0	0	0
Racing Louisville FC	Total		0	0	0	0	0	0	0	0	0	0
Avaldsnes IL	2023	Toppserien	11	0	2	0	—		0	0	13	0
Celtic	2023–24	Scottish Women's Premier League	27 (Note: Includes Scottish Women's Premier League Top Six matches)	0	2	0	2	0	3 (Note: Appearance(s) in Scottish Women's Premier League Cup)	0	34	0
Celtic	2024–25	Scottish Women's Premier League	23	0	1	0	9	0	1	0	34	0
Celtic	Total		50	0	3	0	11	0	4	0	68	0
Career total			119	0	8	0	15	0	5	0	147	0
