= Lauren Gogal =

American soccer player (born 2003)

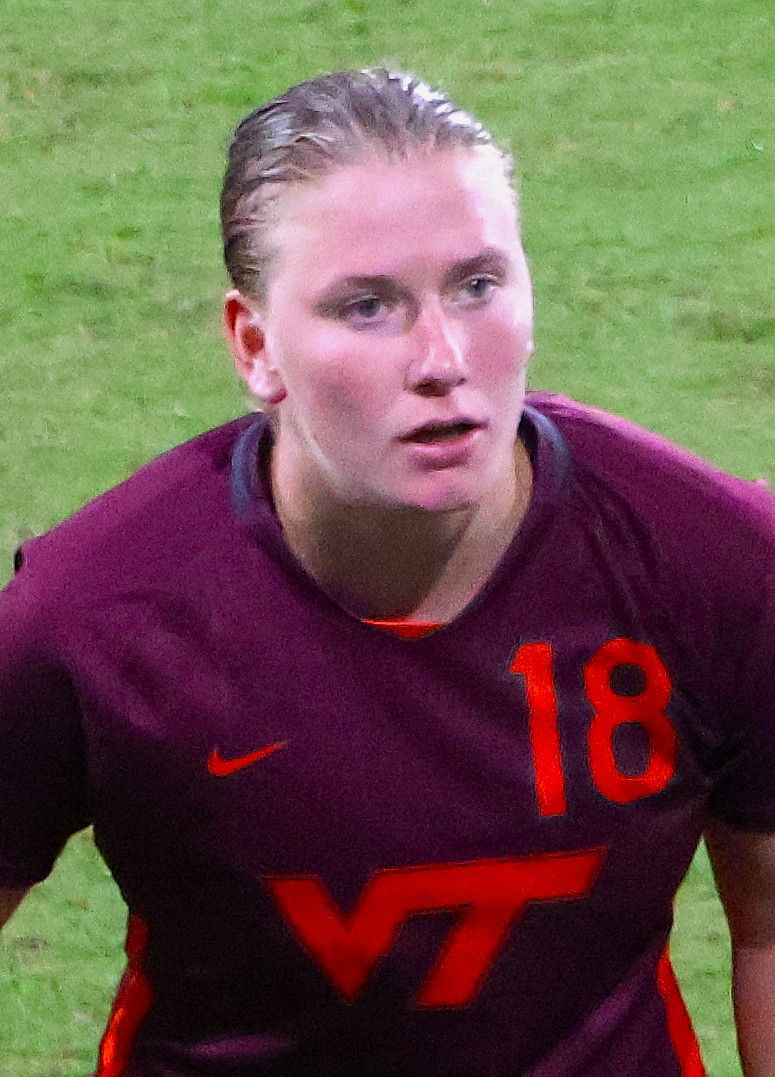
- Gogal with Virginia Tech in 2024

Personal information
- Full name: Lauren Elizabeth Gogal
- Date of birth: July 15, 2003 (age 23)
- Height: 5 ft 10 in (1.78 m)
- Positions: Center back; defensive midfielder

Team information
- Current team: Brooklyn FC
- Number: 22

College career
| Years | Team | Apps | (Gls) |
| 2021–2024 | Virginia Tech Hokies | 63 | (3) |

Senior career*
| Years | Team | Apps | (Gls) |
| 2025 | Lexington SC (USL W) | 10 | (2) |
| 2025 | Washington Spirit | 0 | (0) |
| 2025 | Utah Royals | 0 | (0) |
| 2025– | Brooklyn FC | 3 | (0) |
- * Club domestic league appearances and goals as of 20:15, May 17, 2026 (UTC)

Lauren Elizabeth Gogal (born July 15, 2003) is an American professional soccer player who plays as a center back for USL Super League club Brooklyn FC. She played college soccer for the Virginia Tech Hokies and began her professional career with the Washington Spirit in 2025.

== Early life ==
Gogal was born in Annandale, Virginia, and raised in Haymarket, Virginia. She began playing for the Virginia Soccer Association when she was five. Growing up, her soccer idol was Lionel Messi, as she was one of the shorter players while playing up two age groups. In 2017, she joined the inaugural girls' team at Virginia Development Academy, where she earned ECNL all-conference honors in 2021. She was homeschooled during high school and took some classes at Northern Virginia Community College.

== College career ==
Gogal played four seasons for the Virginia Tech Hokies, making 64 appearances (43 starts) and scoring 3 goals as a defender or midfielder. In her freshman year in 2021, she started both NCAA tournament games as Virginia Tech defeated Ohio State in the first round to collect their first NCAA tournament win since 2018. In her senior year in 2024, she started four NCAA tournament games as the seventh seed Hokies reached the quarterfinals for the second time in program history, with wins over Tennessee, two seed UCLA, and three seed Iowa.

== Club career ==
After college, Gogal joined the Washington Spirit as a non-roster invitee in the 2025 preseason. She subsequently played for Lexington SC's USL W League side, appearing in all 10 games and scoring 2 goals. On July 23, the Spirit signed Gogal to a national team replacement contract through August 20. On August 19, the day before the contract expired, she made her professional debut by starting and playing 90 minutes in the Spirit's 7–0 away win over Salvadoran club Alianza in the 2025–26 CONCACAF W Champions Cup group stage. On September 12, the Utah Royals announced that they had signed Gogal until the end of the season, but she did not make any appearances for the club.

On December 3, 2025, Gogal signed with USL Super League club Brooklyn FC for the rest of the season. She made her Super League debut three days later, coming on as a second-half substitute in a 1–0 loss to the Carolina Ascent.

== Personal life ==
Gogal is the daughter of Daniel and Lisa Gogal and has five siblings. She is the cousin of Guam international footballer Conner Cappelletti.
