= Annie Williams-Arlington =

American soccer player (born 1997)

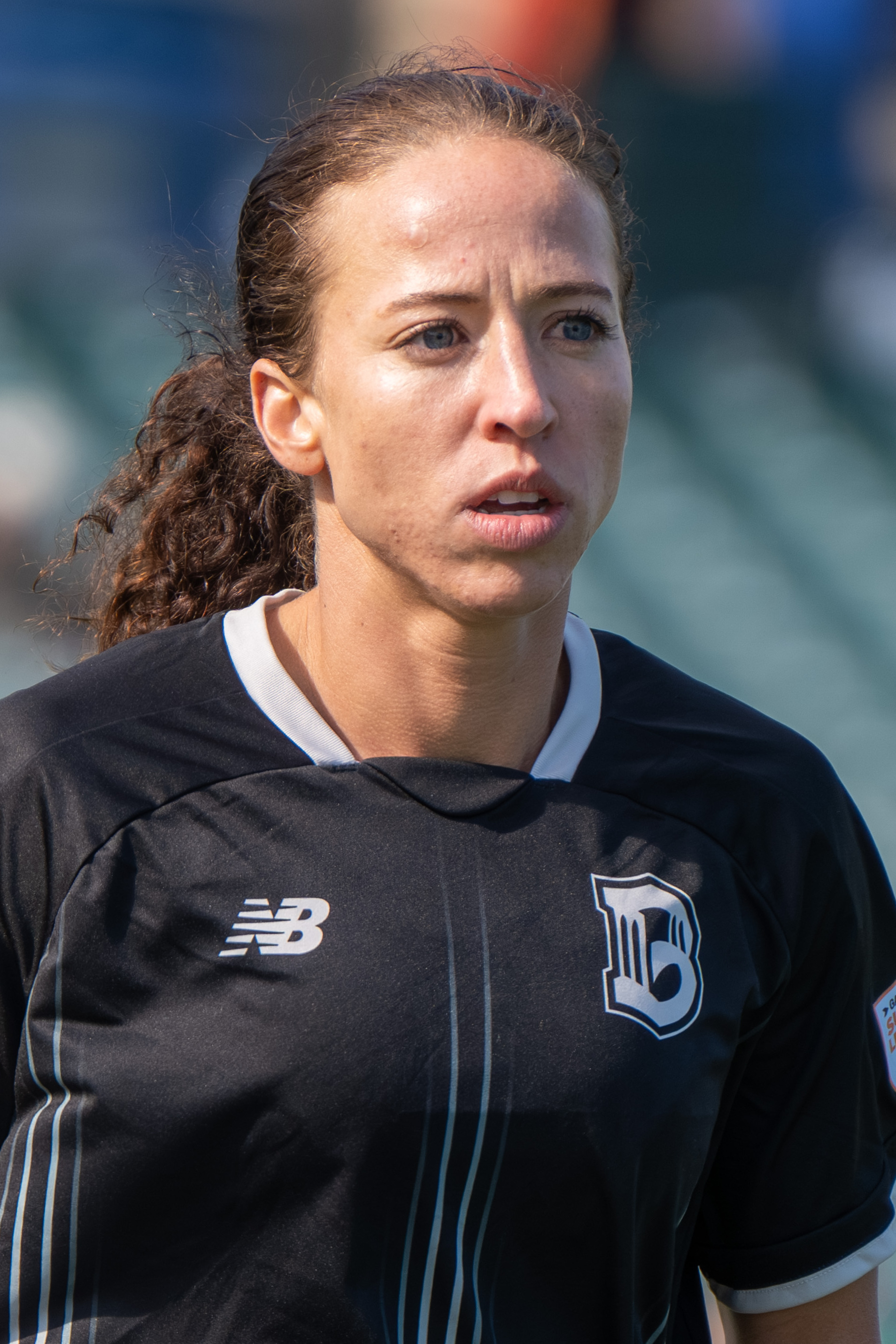
- Williams with Brooklyn FC in 2026

Personal information
- Birth name: Antoinette Jewel Williams
- Date of birth: August 4, 1997 (age 29)
- Place of birth: Cottage Grove, Minnesota, U.S.
- Height: 5 ft 8 in (1.73 m)
- Position: Defender

Team information
- Current team: Brooklyn FC
- Number: 55

College career
Years	Team	Apps	(Gls)
2015–2018	South Dakota State Jackrabbits	75	(3)

Senior career*
Years	Team	Apps	(Gls)
2021	ÍBV	17	(1)
2022	Kalmar	8	(0)
2022–2024	Parma	39	(0)
2025	Minnesota Aurora	14	(0)
2025–	Brooklyn FC	25	(1)
- * Club domestic league appearances and goals as of 20:19, May 17, 2026 (UTC)

Antoinette Jewel "Annie" Williams-Arlington (née Williams; August 4, 1997) is an American professional soccer player who plays as a defender for USL Super League club Brooklyn FC.
