= Kiki Marković =

Croatian professional soccer player

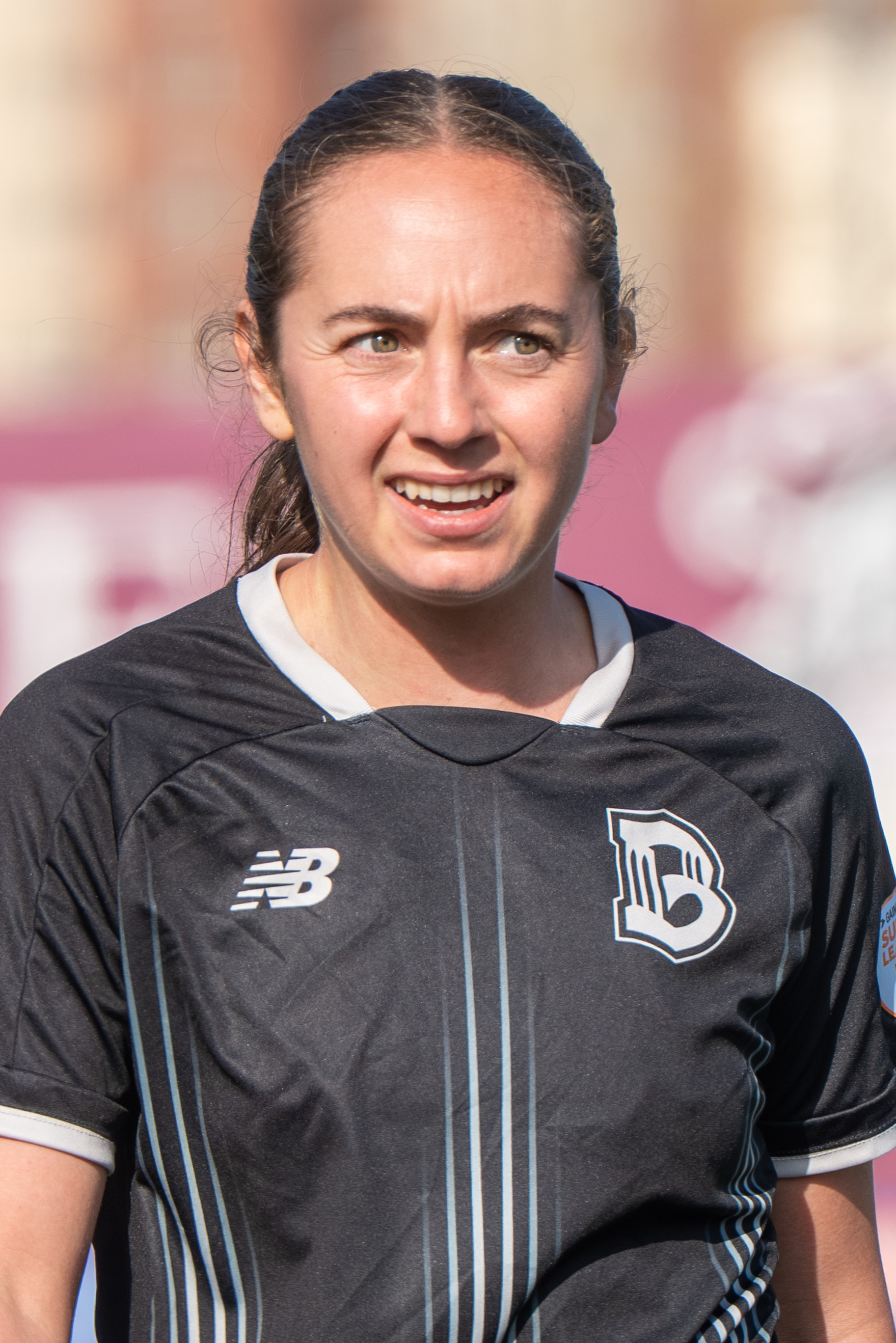
- Marković with Brooklyn FC in 2026

Personal information
- Full name: Kristina Smilja Marković
- Date of birth: July 21, 2001 (age 25)
- Place of birth: Zürich, Switzerland
- Position: Attacking midfielder

Team information
- Current team: Brooklyn FC
- Number: 14

Youth career
- FC Zürich
- FC Oerlikon/Polizei

Senior career*
Years	Team	Apps	(Gls)
- Grasshopper Club Zürich
- FC Luzern
2022–2025	FC Rapperswil-Jona		
2025–	Brooklyn FC	10	(0)

International career
	Croatia	3	(0)
- * Club domestic league appearances and goals as of 20:14, 17 May 2026 (UTC)

Kristina Smilja Marković (born 21 July 2001), known as Kiki Marković, is a Croatian professional soccer player who plays as an attacking midfielder for Brooklyn FC in the USL Super League and the Croatian national team.

== Early life ==
Marković was born in Zürich, Switzerland, to a Croatian mother and a Bosnian-Herzegovinian father. She is the elder sister of Ana Maria Marković, a fellow Croatian international who also plays for Brooklyn FC. Marković began playing football at the age of eight, initially with the boys in her neighbourhood before joining a club academy. Both sisters began their football careers in the FC Zürich academy system.

== Club career ==
=== Early career ===
Marković came through the youth systems of FC Zürich and FC Oerlikon/Polizei in the Zürich area before progressing into senior football with Grasshopper Club Zürich and subsequently FC Luzern in the Swiss Women's Super League.

=== FC Rapperswil-Jona ===
In 2022, Marković joined FC Rapperswil-Jona in the Swiss Women's Super League. Over three seasons with the club, she made 36 league appearances and scored 5 goals. Including playoff matches, she appeared 52 times and scored 9 goals across all competitions.

=== Brooklyn FC ===
On August 15, 2025, Marković signed with Brooklyn FC for the 2025–26 Gainbridge Super League season, joining her sister Ana Maria Marković at the club. Sporting Director Kevin Tenjo said of the signing: "Ana and Kiki bring more than quality on the pitch. They bring leadership, character, and a winning mentality." Brooklyn FC opened its second season on August 23, 2025.

== International career ==
Marković has represented the Croatian national team at senior level, earning three caps.

== Personal life ==
Marković is the younger sister of Ana Maria Marković, who is also a professional soccer player and Croatian international. The sisters were raised in Zürich and both began their football careers at FC Zürich. Together they co-founded RELOADZ, a Swiss vegan protein water brand. Ana has described Kiki's playing style by comparing her to Croatian men's national team star Luka Modrić.
