= Catherine Zimmerman =

American soccer player (born 1994)

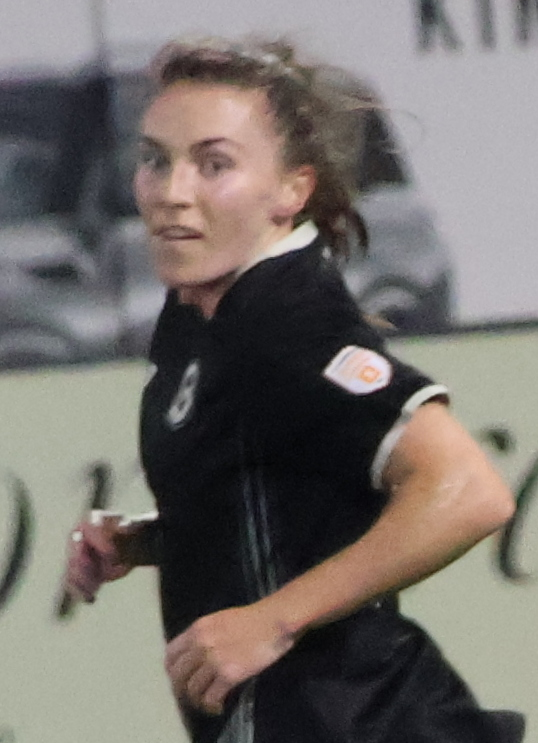
- Zimmerman with Brooklyn FC in 2026

Personal information
- Full name: Catherine McCabe Zimmerman
- Date of birth: January 15, 1994 (age 32)
- Place of birth: Madison, New Jersey, United States
- Position: Forward

Team information
- Current team: Brooklyn FC
- Number: 19

Youth career
- Madison High School
- Player Development Academy (PDA)

College career
Years	Team	Apps	(Gls)
2012–2015	Providence Friars	68	(32)

Senior career*
Years	Team	Apps	(Gls)
2016	Western New York Flash	0	(0)
2016–2017	Sky Blue FC	5	(0)
2018–2019	Calder United	56	(78)
2020–2023	Melbourne Victory	39	(14)
2023–2025	Western United	22	(7)
2025–	Brooklyn FC	18	(6)
- * Club domestic league appearances and goals as of 20:18, May 17, 2026 (UTC)

Catherine McCabe Zimmerman (born January 15, 1994) is an American professional soccer player who plays as a forward for USL Super League club Brooklyn FC.

== Early life and college career ==
Zimmerman played for Madison High School, scoring 50 goals and notching 25 assists. In four years at Madison, she earned several accolades and honors. She was included in the First Team All-County in 2010 and All-Conference (2010–11). She was also named First Team All-State (2010–11), Morris County Player of the Year (2011) and Star Ledger Player of the Year (2011).

=== Providence Friars ===
Zimmerman then went to Providence College. Her freshman year was a little slow as she only played 10 matches for the Friars. Nevertheless, she managed to score 7 goals and notched on assist, leading the team in points (15). In the following 3 years, Zimmerman became a key player for Providence, leading the team in points and goals in each of the years. Because of her performance, Zimmerman was named for the BIG EAST All-Tournament team, All-BIG EAST First Team honors and was also chosen the 2015 BIG EAST All-Tournament Most Outstanding Offensive Player.

== Club career ==
=== Western New York Flash ===
After an outstanding career at college, Zimmerman declared herself for the 2016 NWSL College Draft, but she was not picked by any team. However, her college coach, had a good relationship with Western New York Flash's coach Paul Riley and he managed to get her an invitation to the Flash's preseason camp in Rochester, New York. She began training with Flash, but continued her college education. Zimmerman was included in the Western New York Flash's official roster for the 2016 season, but after not getting to play any minute for the Rochester team, she made the decision to put her career on hold and pursue a graduation.

=== Sky Blue FC ===
Back to home at New Jersey, Zimmerman used her contacts to earn a place in the Sky Blue Reserves. On July 1, 2016, with several attacking players cut from the squad for injury problems, the team made the decision to waive GK Erin Nayler to make room and officially signed with Zimmerman. On July 2, she debuted for the SBFC. Zimmerman started and played 73 minutes of the match against the Portland Thorns. She, then, started four of the five matches she played for SBFC until July 31, when Zimmerman suffered an injury after colliding with Estelle Johnson in the 25th minute of the match against Washington Spirit.

=== Calder United ===
Zimmerman signed for Australian National Premier Leagues Victoria Women side Calder United SC in 2018. In her debut with Calder, Zimmerman scored both goals in her club's FFV Women's Community Shield 2–1 victory over South Melbourne FC. Calder finished in 2nd place in the 2018 NPL Victoria Women season and Zimmerman finished as the league's Golden Boot winner, with 43 goals in 28 games. The following season, United won the treble, taking out the Nike Cup, league premiership and league championship. Zimmerman scored 33 goals in 27 league games, again winning both the league Golden Boot and Gold Medal award.

=== Melbourne Victory ===
In October 2020, Zimmerman signed with W-League side Melbourne Victory.

=== Western United ===
In July 2023, Zimmerman departed Melbourne Victory and joined rival Western United. She departed the club in June 2025 to take up an opportunity at home.

=== Brooklyn FC ===
On July 2, 2025, Brooklyn FC signed Zimmerman ahead of the USL Super League's second season of play. She debuted for the club on August 23, starting and scoring the opening goal in Brooklyn's opening-day victory over Tampa Bay Sun FC.
