= Brooklyn FC (2024) =

Professional soccer club in New York City

Brooklyn FC (Women)
- Full name: Brooklyn Football Club
- Nicknames: Brooklyn FC, BKFC
- Short name: BKFC
- Founded: June 8, 2023; 3 years ago
- Ground: Maimonides Park; Brooklyn, New York City
- Capacity: 7,000
- Owner: North Sixth Group
- Sporting Director: Brian McBride
- Coach: Alex Smith
- League: USL Super League
- 2025–26: USL Super League, 7th of 9
- Website: brooklynfootballclub.com/women
Home colors	Away colors

Brooklyn Football Club is an American professional women's soccer club based in Brooklyn, New York City, that competes in the USL Super League (USLS). Founded in 2023, the club began playing in 2024 and also fields a men's team in the USL Championship (USLC).

== History ==
On June 8, 2023, the United Soccer League announced that North Sixth Group had been granted a USL League One expansion team in Brooklyn, to start play in the 2025 season, with a women's and youth team to follow.

USMNT International Timothy Weah joined the ownership group on May 28, 2024.

At its founding, the club announced that in addition to its men's team, it intended to field a women's team in the USL Super League. The Super League is a Division One league, representing the top level of women's soccer in the United States, and began play in August 2024. It was reported in late 2023 that a women's team would be established in 2025, which would be for the Super League's second season. However, on February 9, 2024, the USL announced that Brooklyn FC's women's team would be one of the Super League's inaugural eight teams.

=== Inaugural season ===
The league released its season schedule on May 30, 2024, establishing the club's inaugural match would be on Saturday, August 31, a home game against Carolina Ascent FC.

Brooklyn FC announced on May 17, 2024, that they had signed the first-ever player in club history, Puerto Rican national team goalkeeper Sydney Martinez.

Due to unspecified issues with the playing surface being laid down at Maimonides Park, the club postponed its inaugural match, announcing that the club's first home match would instead be September 25, 2024, against Dallas Trinity FC.

== Colors and badge ==
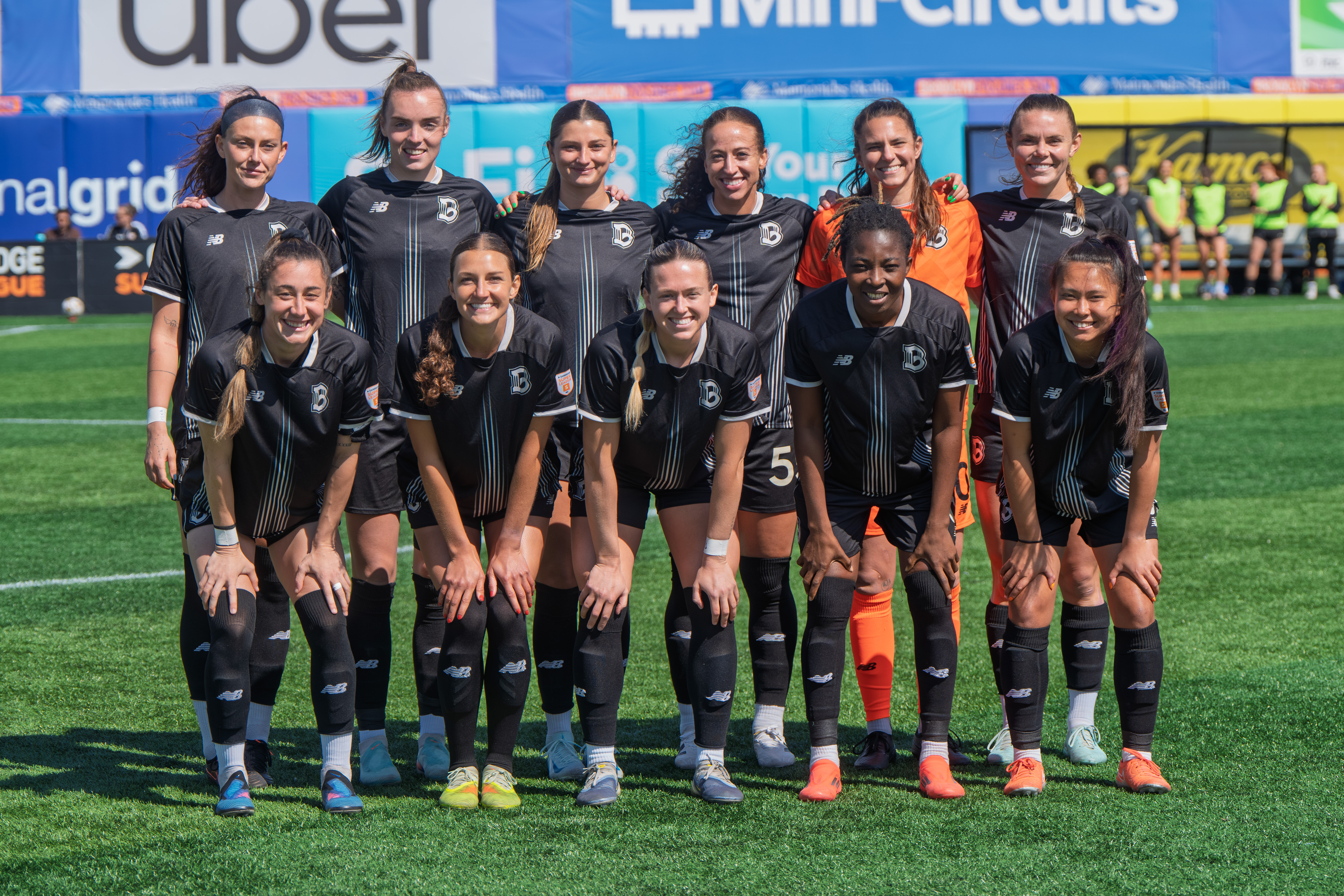
Brooklyn FC Starting XI during Brooklyn FC vs Dallas Trinity FC on April 12, 2026

The club's name and logo, designed by British-based designer Christopher Payne, were unveiled on November 9, 2023. The limestone color is a reference to the Brooklyn Bridge which is represented in the logo, and the brown color reflects the brownstone buildings seen across the borough.

The badge and identity will be used by all Brooklyn FC teams. The club originally announced a kit deal with Kappa, but after the ownership group acquired a stake in manufacturer Diaza, the contract was transferred.

=== Sponsorship ===
Period	Kit manufacturer	Shirt sponsor	Back sponsor	Sleeve sponsor
2024–2025	Diaza	Liquid Death	The Perecman Firm	N/A
2026-Present	New Balance	N/A	N/A	N/A

== Players and staff ==
=== Roster ===
As of October 28, 2026

Note: Flags indicate national team as defined under FIFA eligibility rules; some limited exceptions apply. Players may hold more than one non-FIFA nationality.

No.	Pos.	Nation	Player
00	GK	ARM	Sophine Kevorkian
1	GK	USA	Breanna Norris
2	DF	USA	Laila Booker
3	FW	USA	Tziarra King
5	DF	USA	Jordan Thompson
6	MF	GHA	Jennifer Cudjoe
7	DF	KOR	Shin Na-yeong
8	MF	USA	Emma Loving
9	FW	USA	Jessica Garziano
10	FW	IRL	Rebecca Cooke
11	FW	USA	Sofia Lewis
13	MF	USA	Sara D'Appolonia

No.	Pos.	Nation	Player
14	MF	CRO	Kiki Marković
17	MF	USA	Jilly Shimkin
19	FW	USA	Catherine Zimmerman
20	MF	USA	Sophia Lowenberg (on loan from Boston Legacy FC)
22	DF	USA	Lauren Gogal
21	MF	USA	Carlee Giammona
23	FW	USA	Jackie Richards
24	MF	ENG	Abbey-Leigh Stringer
25	GK	USA	Nicolette Pasquarella
27	MF	USA	Ashlyn Miller
55	DF	USA	Annie Williams-Arlington

=== Former players ===
For details of former players, see Category:Brooklyn FC players and List of Brooklyn FC (women) players.

=== Coaching staff ===
As of July 8, 2026

Position	Staff
Head coach	Alex Smith

== Records ==
=== Year-by-year ===
As of April 30, 2025

Season	League	Regular season								Playoffs	Avg. attendance	Top Goalscorer	
Season	League	P	W	D	L	GF	GA	Pts	Pos	Playoffs	Avg. attendance	Name(s)	Goals
2024–25	USLS	28	10	9	9	30	34	39	6	No	1,208	Jessica Garziano	6

1. Top goalscorer(s) includes all goals scored in League, and USL Super Cup Playoffs, and other competitive matches.

=== Head coaching record ===
As of July 12, 2026

Only competitive matches are counted.*

All-time Brooklyn FC coaching records
Name	Nationality	From	To	P	W	D	L	GF	GA	Win%
Kristen Sample (interim)	United States	September 8, 2024	September 23, 2024	2	1	1	0	2	1	75.00
Jessica Silva	Canada	September 23, 2024	April 16, 2025	21	8	5	8	21	28	50.00
Fabio Barros (interim)	United States	April 18, 2026	May 17, 2025	5	1	3	1	7	5	25.00
Tomás Tengarrinha	Portugal	August 5, 2025	May 19, 2026	28	6	8	14	31	44	21.43
Alex Smith	United States	July 8, 2026	present	0	0	0	0	0	0	00.00

=== Team records ===
As of May 18, 2026. Current players in bold. Statistics are updated once a year after the conclusion of the USL Super League season.

Most appearances
Player					Appearances		
#	Name	Nat.	Pos.	Brooklyn career	USLS	Playoffs	Total
1	**Samantha Kroeger**	(United States)	MF	2024–	56	0	56
2	**Jessica Garziano**	(United States)	FW	2024–	55	0	55
3	**Kelsey Hill**	(United States)	DF	2024–	52	0	52
4	**Hope Breslin**	(United States)	MF	2024–	51	0	51
5	**Leah Scarpelli**	(United States)	DF	2024–	49	0	49
6	Mackenzie George	(United States)	FW	2024–2025	28	0	28
6	Allison Pantuso	(United States)	DF	2024–2025	28	0	28
6	Samantha Rosette	(United States)	DF	2024–2026	28	0	28
9	Luana Grabias	(Brazil)	FW	2024–2025	27	0	27
9	**Sofia Lewis**	(United States)	FW	2025–	27	0	27

Top goalscorers
Player					Goals scored		
#	Name	Nat.	Pos.	Brooklyn career	USLS	Playoffs	Total
1	**Rebecca Cooke**	(Republic of Ireland)	FW	2025–	9	0	9
2	**Jessica Garziano**	(United States)	FW	2024–	6	0	6
2	**Catherine Zimmerman**	(United States)	FW	2025–	6	0	6
4	Luana Grabias	(Brazil)	FW	2024–2025	5	0	5
5	**Hope Breslin**	(United States)	MF	2024–	4	0	4
5	Mackenzie George	(United States)	FW	2024–2025	4	0	4
7	Isabel Cox	(United States)	FW	2024	3	0	3
7	Dana Scheriff	(United States)	FW	2024–2025	3	0	3

== Academy ==
On December 7, 2023, Brooklyn FC announced that Two Bridges Football Club, a New York City-based youth soccer organization, would become the club's official youth academy and would start playing in the USL Academy League in 2024. Maximilian Mansfield, the executive director of Two Bridges, was named president and CEO of Brooklyn FC. As of October 2024, Mansfield is no longer the CEO nor President of Brooklyn FC.

The academy's U23 team started play in the semi-professional United Premier Soccer League (UPSL) 2024 as Brooklyn FC II.

On June 12, 2024, the club announced that its U20 academy side would play an exhibition match against Ecuadorian Serie A club C.D. Cuenca on July 13.

== Stadium ==
On January 19, 2024, it was reported that Brooklyn FC plan to play their matches at Maimonides Park in the Coney Island neighborhood of Brooklyn. That was confirmed by the league on January 31, announcing that the team had signed a multi-year deal.

Maimonides Park is a 7,000-seat stadium on the Coney Island Boardwalk. It had briefly been the home of the second New York Cosmos in 2017, prior to that club going on hiatus. Brooklyn FC intends to use a different field orientation than the Cosmos previously used, leaving the pitcher's mound intact and "maximiz(ing) a lot of the space around the field".

Before the women's opener in 2024, the club cited issues with the soccer turf installation that necessitated moving their first seven home matches to Rocco B. Commisso Soccer Stadium at Columbia University.
