= List of DC Power FC players =

DC Power FC is an American professional women's soccer club which began play in the inaugural season of the USL Super League. All players who have made a competitive appearance for DC Power FC are listed below.

== Key ==
- The list is ordered alphabetically.
- Appearances as a substitute are included.
- Statistics are correct as of May 16, 2026, the end of the 2025–26 USL Super League season, and are updated once a year after the conclusion of the USL Super League season.
- Players whose names are highlighted in **bold** were active players on the Power FC roster as of the list's most recent update.

Positions key
GK	Goalkeeper
DF	Defender
MF	Midfielder
FW	Forward

Nationality
Unless otherwise noted, the nationality of a player is determined by the country they most recently represented in international play, or if said player has not played international football then by their country of birth.
Position
Playing positions are listed according to the player's roster designation as of the list's most recent update.
Years
Years are defined as the first and last calendar years in which the player was rostered for the club in any of the competitions listed below.
Appearances and goals
This list counts appearances and goals in the USL Super League and USL Super League playoffs.

== Players ==
Yrs	No.	Pos	Nat	Player	Total		USL Super League		Playoffs	
Yrs	No.	Pos	Nat	Player	Apps	Goals	Apps	Goals	Apps	Goals
2024–	30	FW	(Ethiopia) ETH	Loza Abera	50	12	50	12	0	0
2025–	22	DF	(United States) USA	Paige Almendariz	26	0	26	0	0	0
2024–	1	GK	(Australia) AUS	Morgan Aquino	40	0	40	0	0	0
2024–	2	MF	(United States) USA	Anna Bagley	51	2	51	2	0	0
2024	5	FW	(United States) USA	Jorian Baucom (Note: Baucom was DC Power's inaugural signing, announced on June 27, 2024. She also scored DC Power's first club goal, which came against Dallas Trinity FC on September 7, 2024.)	13	1	13	1	0	0
2025–	11	FW	(Puerto Rico) PUR	Jaydah Bedoya	19	3	19	3	0	0
2024–2025	14	MF	(United States) USA	Phoebe Canoles	1	0	1	0	0	0
2025–	5	MF	(United States) USA	Emily Colton	38	1	38	1	0	0
2024–	12	DF	(Haiti) HAI	Claire Constant	39	1	39	1	0	0
2024–2025	46	MF	(United States) USA	Riley Cross	1	0	1	0	0	0
2024–2025	6	MF	(Ghana) GHA	Jennifer Cudjoe	18	0	18	0	0	0
2025–	6	DF	(Guyana) GUY	Sydney Cummings	28	1	28	1	0	0
2025	23	FW	(United States) USA	Margie Detrizio	10	0	10	0	0	0
2024–2025	24	DF	(Puerto Rico) PUR	Amber DiOrio	19	0	19	0	0	0
2024–2025	11	MF	(England) ENG	Nicole Douglas	5	0	5	0	0	0
2024–2025	9	MF	(United States) USA	Katie Duong	36	1	36	1	0	0
2024–2025	17	MF	(Wales) WAL	Charlie Estcourt	20	0	20	0	0	0
2024–	3	DF	(United States) USA	Susanna Fitch	45	2	45	2	0	0
2024–2025	41	FW	(United States) USA	Allie Flanagan	4	2	4	2	0	0
2026–	8	MF	(United States) USA	Lexi Fraley	13	0	13	0	0	0
2025–	7	FW	(Philippines) PHI	Carleigh Frilles	14	0	14	0	0	0
2025	47	MF	(Peru) PER	Leia Galliani	1	0	1	0	0	0
2024–2025	33	GK	(United States) USA	Adelaide Gay	7	0	7	0	0	0
2026–	23	MF	(United States) USA	Justina Gaynor	14	0	14	0	0	0
2025–	16	MF	(United States) USA	Ellie Gilbert	16	1	16	1	0	0
2025–	43	GK	(United States) USA	Makenna Gottschalk	9	0	9	0	0	0
2025–	13	FW	(United States) USA	Gianna Gourley	37	15	37	15	0	0
2024–	21	MF	(Philippines) PHI	Katrina Guillou	30	0	30	0	0	0
2026–	17	FW	(United States) USA	Hannah Harney	12	0	12	0	0	0
2025	50	FW	(United States) USA	Carrie Helfrich	2	0	2	0	0	0
2024–2025	25	MF	(United States) USA	Alex Kirnos	6	0	6	0	0	0
2024–2025	8	DF	(United States) USA	Myra Konte	13	0	13	0	0	0
2024–2025	19	MF	(Japan) JPN	Yuuka Kurosaki	23	1	23	1	0	0
2024	7	FW	(United States) USA	Mariah Lee	12	0	12	0	0	0
2026–	24	DF	(United States) USA	Kiki Maki	4	0	4	0	0	0
2024–2025	45	DF	(United States) USA	Maleeya Martin	5	0	5	0	0	0
2024–	20	MF	(United States) USA	Madison Murnin	37	1	37	1	0	0
2024–	10	MF	(Cameroon) CMR	Grace Ngock Yango	19	0	19	0	0	0
2025–	47	MF	(United States) USA	Valentina Perrotta	10	0	10	0	0	0
2024–2025	4	DF	(England) ENG	Abbey-Leigh Stringer	3	0	3	0	0	0
2024–2025	43	MF	(United States) USA	Loretta Talbott	3	0	3	0	0	0
2025–	4	MF	(United States) USA	Alexis Theoret	22	0	22	0	0	0
2025–	18	MF	(United States) USA	Dasia Torbert	23	4	23	4	0	0
2026–	19	FW	(United States) USA	Alyssa Walker	13	5	13	5	0	0
2026	28	GK	(United States) USA	Sara Wojdelko	1	0	1	0	0	0
2024–2025	29	DF	(United States) USA	Madison Wolfbauer	26	3	26	3	0	0
2025	23	MF	(United States) USA	Zaneta Wyne	1	0	1	0	0	0

== By nationality ==
In total, 47 players representing 14 different countries have appeared for DC Power FC.

Note: Countries indicate national team as defined under FIFA eligibility rules. Players may hold more than one non-FIFA nationality.

Country	Total players
Australia	1
Cameroon	1
England	2
Ethiopia	1
Ghana	1
Guyana	1
Haiti	1
Japan	1
Peru	1
Puerto Rico	1
Philippines	2
Puerto Rico	1
United States	32
Wales	1

== See also ==
- List of top-division football clubs in CONCACAF countries
- List of professional sports teams in the United States and Canada
