= 2025–26 DC Power FC season =

American women's soccer club season

DC Power FC
2025–26 season
- General manager: Jordan Stuart
- Head coach: Omid Namazi
- Stadium: Audi Field, Washington, D.C.
- All statistics correct as of 13 May 2025.

The 2025–26 season of DC Power FC is the team's second season as a professional women's soccer team, being one of eight charter clubs in the USL Super League (USLS).

== Current roster ==
As of April 13, 2026

Note: Flags indicate national team as defined under FIFA eligibility rules; some limited exceptions apply. Players may hold more than one non-FIFA nationality.

No.	Pos.	Nation	Player
1	GK	AUS	Morgan Aquino
2	MF	USA	Anna Bagley
3	DF	USA	Susanna Fitch
4	MF	USA	Alexis Theoret
5	MF	USA	Emily Colton
6	DF	GUY	Sydney Cummings
7	MF	PHI	Carleigh Frilles
8	MF	USA	Lexi Fraley
10	MF	CMR	Grace Ngock Yango
11	FW	PUR	Jaydah Bedoya
12	DF	HAI	Claire Constant
13	FW	USA	Gianna Gourley

No.	Pos.	Nation	Player
14	MF	JAM	Chinyelu Asher
16	MF	USA	Ellie Gilbert
17	FW	USA	Hannah Harney
18	MF	USA	Dasia Torbert
19	FW	USA	Alyssa Walker
20	DF	USA	Madison Murnin
21	MF	PHI	Katrina Guillou
22	DF	USA	Paige Almendariz
23	MF	USA	Justina Gaynor
24	DF	USA	Kiki Maki
30	FW	ETH	Loza Abera
43	GK	USA	Makenna Gottschalk

=== Academy players ===
Note: Flags indicate national team as defined under FIFA eligibility rules; some limited exceptions apply. Players may hold more than one non-FIFA nationality.

No.	Pos.	Nation	Player
47	MF	USA	Valentina Perrotta
88	GK	USA	Emily Krichbaum

=== Staff ===
As of July 30, 2025

Front Office
Position	Name
Club President	(United States) Jordan Stuart
General Manager	(United States) Steve Birnbaum
Technical Staff
Position	Name
Head Coach	(United States) Omid Namazi
Assistant Coach	(United States) Zaneta Wyne
Assistant Coach	(El Salvador) Pablo Amaya
Head of Goalkeeping	(United States) Brian Periman
Performance Coach	(Peru) Tabitha Galliani
Vice President of Team Operations	(England) Bircan Mustafa
Head Athletic Trainer	(United States) Emily Gumowitz
Head of Equipment	(United States) Nicole Miller
Mental Performance	(United States) Gaelin Hirabayashi

== Transactions ==
=== Contract operations ===
Date	Player	Pos.	Fee/notes	Ref.
July 8, 2025	(Philippines) Katrina Guillou	MF	Re-signed to a one-year contract.	
August 14, 2025	(United States) Valentina Perrotta	MF	Re-signed to a new academy contract.	
January 7, 2026	(United States) Emily Colton	MF	One-year contract extension	
January 9, 2026	(Haiti) Claire Constant	DF	One-year contract extension	
January 13, 2026	(United States) Gianna Gourley	FW	One-year contract extension	
January 28, 2026	(United States) Susanna Fitch	DF	One-year contract extension with a club option	
April 27, 2026	(Guyana) Sydney Cummings	DF	One-year contract extension	
April 29, 2026	(United States) Paige Almendariz	DF	One-year contract extension with a club option	

=== Transfers in ===
Date	Player	Pos.	Previous club	Fee/notes	Ref.
June 19, 2025	(United States) Alexis Theoret	MF	(United States) Virginia Cavaliers	College signing	
June 27, 2025	(Guyana) Sydney Cummings	DF	(United States) Spokane Zephyr FC	Free agent	
July 1, 2025	(United States) Margie Detrizio	FW	(United States) Washington Spirit	Free agent	
July 2, 2025	(Puerto Rico) Jaydah Bedoya	FW	(United States) Carolina Ascent FC	Free agent	
July 3, 2025	(United States) Ellie Gilbert	MF	(Hungary) FTC-Telekom	Free agent	
July 4, 2025	(Jamaica) Chinyelu Asher	MF	(Mexico) Mazatlán	Free agent	
July 5, 2025	(United States) Makenna Gottschalk	GK	(United States) Fort Lauderdale United FC	Free agent	
July 9, 2025	(United States) Gianna Gourley	FW	(United States) Fort Lauderdale United FC	Transfer	
July 11, 2025	(United States) Paige Almendariz	DF	(United States) Tampa Bay Sun FC	Free agent	
September 5, 2025	(United States) Dasia Torbert	MF	(United States) Georgia Bulldogs	College signing	
January 7, 2026	(United States) Alyssa Walker	FW	(United States) Carolina Ascent FC	Transfer	
January 28, 2026	(United States) Lexi Fraley	FW	(United States) Purdue Boilermakers	College signing	
January 29, 2026	(United States) Justina Gaynor	MF	(United States) Lexington SC	Free agent	
January 29, 2026	(United States) Hannah Harney	FW	(United States) Lexington SC	Free agent	
February 23, 2026	(United States) Sara Wojdelko	GK	(United States) Washington Spirit	Loaned through 2025–26 season	
March 19, 2026	(United States) Kiki Maki	DF	(United States) Virginia Cavaliers	College signing	
March 27, 2026	(United States) Emily Krichbaum	GK	(United States) Northern Virginia Alliance	Academy signing	

=== Transfers out ===
Date	Player	Pos.	Destination club	Fee/notes	Ref.
June 11, 2025	(United States) Phoebe Canoles	MF		Out of contract.	
June 11, 2025	(Ghana) Jennifer Cudjoe	MF	(United States) Brooklyn FC	Out of contract.	
June 11, 2025	(Puerto Rico) Amber DiOrio	DF	(Sweden) Linköping FC	Out of contract.	
June 11, 2025	(England) Nicole Douglas	FW	(Iceland) Grótta	Out of contract.	
June 11, 2025	(United States) Adelaide Gay	GK	(Scotland) Celtic	Out of contract.	
June 11, 2025	(United States) Alex Kirnos	MF		Out of contract.	
June 11, 2025	(United States) Myra Konte	DF		Out of contract.	
June 11, 2025	(Japan) Yuuka Kurosaki	MF	(Norway) Bodø/Glimt	Out of contract.	
June 11, 2025	(England) Abbey-Leigh Stringer	MF	(England) Burnley	Out of contract.	
June 11, 2025	(United States) Madison Wolfbauer	DF	(Portugal) Rio Ave	Out of contract.	
June 11, 2025	(United States) Amanda Frisbie	DF	Retirement		
June 18, 2025	(Peru) Leia Galliani	MF		Academy players out of contract.	
June 18, 2025	(United States) Carrie Helfrich	MF	(United States) Virginia Cavaliers	Academy players out of contract.	
June 18, 2025	(United States) Loretta Talbott	MF	(United States) Virginia Cavaliers	Academy players out of contract.	
January 6, 2026	(United States) Margie Detrizio	FW	(Portugal) Braga	Contract termination	
January 14, 2026	(United States) Katie Duong	MF	(Iceland) Breiðablik	Contract termination	
January 21, 2026	(Wales) Charlie Estcourt	MF	(England) Portsmouth	Contract termination	
April 13, 2026	(United States) Sara Wojdelko	GK	(United States) Washington Spirit	Recalled from loan	

== USL Super League ==
=== Regular season standings ===
Pos	Team	Pld	W	L	T	GF	GA	GD	Pts	Qualification
4	Dallas Trinity	28	11	10	7	36	40	−4	40	Playoffs
5	Spokane Zephyr	28	10	9	9	34	28	+6	39	
6	DC Power	28	8	11	9	34	32	+2	33	
7	Brooklyn	28	6	14	8	31	44	−13	26	
8	Tampa Bay Sun	28	5	14	9	27	46	−19	24	

Updated to match(es) played on May 16, 2026. Source: Gainbridge Super League
Rules for classification: 1) head-to-head points; 2) total goal differential; 3) total goals scored; 4) disciplinary points; 5) drawing of lots.

=== Matches ===
==== August ====
August 23, 2025 1	Sporting JAX	1–3	DC Power FC	Hodges Stadium
	Pennock 7'	Report	Gourley 38', 68'; Fitch (yellow card) 61'; Bedoya 75'	Attendance: 9,783; Referee: Jaclyn Metz

August 30, 2025 2	DC Power FC	2–2	Spokane Zephyr FC	Audi Field
	Colton 25'; Cummings 76'	Report	Silano 44', 45+2'	Attendance: 4,842; Referee: Iryna Petrunok

==== September ====
September 12, 2025 3	DC Power FC	0–0	Lexington SC	Audi Field
	Gilbert (yellow card) 26'	Report	Aylmer (yellow card) 19'; Perez (yellow card) 28'	Attendance: 2,054; Referee: Kaitlyn Trowbridge

September 18, 2025 4	DC Power FC	2–2	Brooklyn FC	Audi Field
	Abera 19'; Gourley 33'; Bedoya 52'	Report	Freitas (yellow card) 23'; Hill 58'; Cooke 80'	Attendance: 551; Referee: Rachel Swett

==== October ====
October 4, 2025 5	Carolina Ascent FC	3–2	DC Power FC	Charlotte, North Carolina
	George 14'; Mercado 16'; Aguilera (yellow card) 43'; Walker 84'	Report	Studer 35' (o.g.); Murnin 49'; Aquino (yellow card) 84'}; Detrizio (yellow card) 88'	Stadium: American Legion Memorial Stadium; Attendance: 3,161; Referee: Shawn Tehini

October 14, 2025 6	DC Power FC	0–1	Sporting JAX	Audi Field
		Report	Hughes (yellow card) 44'; Pennock 64'; Lester (yellow card) 90+2'	Attendance: 251; Referee: Alexandra Billeter

October 19, 2025 7	DC Power FC	1–1	Spokane Zephyr FC	Audi Field
	Gourley 90+5'	Report	Cook 52' (.pen); Tucker (yellow card) 82'	Attendance: 510; Referee: Patricia McCracken

==== November ====
November 2, 2025 8	Dallas Trinity FC	2–3	DC Power FC	Cotton Bowl
	Brian (yellow card) 18' (goal) 85'; Lancaster 20'	Report	Bedoya 13'; Fitch 70'; Gourley 78'	Attendance: 3,229; Referee: Iryna Petrunok

November 8, 2025 9	Brooklyn FC	1–0	DC Power FC	Maimonides Park
	Scarpelli 49' (yellow card) 73'; Daugherty (yellow card) 76'; Williams (yellow card) 89'	Report	Almendariz (yellow card) 31'; Duong (yellow card) 45'; Constant (yellow card) 83'	Attendance: 892; Referee: Luis Arroyo

November 13, 2025 10	DC Power FC	3–1	Fort Lauderdale United FC	Audi Field
	Torbert 21', 40'; Gilbert (yellow card) 29'; Abera 83'; Gourley (yellow card) 84'	Report	Ansbrow (yellow card) 35'; Simpson 45+3'; Van Treeck (yellow card) 78'	Attendance: 276; Referee: Danielle Chesky

November 21, 2025 11	DC Power FC	0–1	Carolina Ascent FC	Washington, D.C.
	Duong (yellow card) 78'	Report	Baisden 57'; Corbin (yellow card) 80'	Stadium: Audi Field; Attendance: 2,182; Referee: Calin Radosav

==== December ====
December 6, 2025 12	Dallas Trinity FC	2–1	DC Power FC	Cotton Bowl
	Thornton 10' (yellow card) 65'; Brian 33'	Report	Gourley 21'	Attendance: 2,569; Referee: Elton García

December 13, 2025 13	Lexington SC	2–2	DC Power FC	Lexington SC Stadium
	Aylmer 40'; Weinert 70'	Report	Gourley 21', 45+1'; Cummings (yellow card) 25'	Attendance: 1,911; Referee: Jamie Padilla

December 20, 2025 14	Carolina Ascent FC	0–0	DC Power FC	American Legion Memorial Stadium
	Aguilera (yellow card) 90+4'	Report		Attendance: 2,861; Referee: Gerald Flores

==== February ====
February 7, 2026 15	Sporting JAX	0–1	DC Power FC	Hodges Stadium
	Brown (yellow card) 55'; Boman (yellow card) 58'; Puerta (penalty missed)	Report	Walker 78'	Attendance: 8,358; Referee: Alexandra Billeter

February 14, 2026 16	Tampa Bay Sun FC	1–1	DC Power FC	Suncoast Credit Union Field
	Fusco 23'; Listro (yellow card) 78'	Report	Hannah Richardson (yellow card) 49'; Constant 63'	Attendance: 2,050; Referee: Lauren Aldrich

==== March ====
March 7, 2026 17	Brooklyn FC	0–2	DC Power FC	Maimonides Park
		Report	Walker 32' (pen.); Abera 63'	Attendance: 624; Referee: Stephen Foster

March 12, 2026 18	DC Power FC	1–1	Dallas Trinity FC	Audi Field
	Abera 17'; Constant (yellow card) 58'	Report	Stainbrook (yellow card) 7'; Bos 44'	Referee: Jamie Padilla

March 17, 2026 19	DC Power FC	0–1	Carolina Ascent FC	Audi Field
	Gourley (yellow card) 84'	Report	Lussi 79'	Attendance: 1,050; Referee: Joshua Encarnación

March 22, 2026 20	Spokane Zephyr FC	0–2	DC Power FC	One Spokane Stadium
		Report	Walker 46'; Torbert 55'	Attendance: 1,332; Referee: Kaitlyn Trowbridge

March 26, 2026 21	DC Power FC	0–2	Tampa Bay Sun FC	Audi Field
		Report	Webber 10'; Shimkin 62'	Attendance: 856; Referee: Danielle Chesky

==== April ====
April 2, 2026 22	DC Power FC	0–2	Lexington SC	Audi Field
		Report	Barry 49', 87'	Attendance: 1,129; Referee: Jorge Escobar

April 6, 2026 23	Fort Lauderdale United FC	3–1	DC Power FC	Beyond Bancard Field
	Thompson 26'; Constant 61' (o.g.); Colvin 68'	Report	Abera 45+2'	Attendance: 1,865; Referee: Alejo Calume

April 12, 2026 24	Tampa Bay Sun FC	0–2	DC Power FC	Suncoast Credit Union Field
		Report	Walker 18'; Torbert 24'	Attendance: 1,731; Referee: Laura Rodriguez

April 23, 2026 25	DC Power FC	4–0	Fort Lauderdale United FC	Audi Field
	Walker 39'; Abera 54', 72'; Bedoya 83'	Report	Vaka (red card) 10'	Attendance: 953; Referee: Marie Durr

==== May ====
May 2, 2026 26	DC Power	1–1	Dallas Trinity FC	Audi Field
	Gilbert 79'	Report	Bos 52'	Attendance: 1,407; Referee: Kelsey Harms

May 7, 2026 27	DC Power FC	0–1	Sporting JAX	Audi Field
		Report	DeSmit 33'	Attendance: 1,013; Referee: John Matto

May 10, 2026 28	Spokane Zephyr FC	1–0	DC Power FC	One Spokane Stadium
	Jaskaniec 69'	Report		Attendance: 1,436; Referee: Elton García
