= 2024–25 DC Power FC season =

Inaugural DC Power FC season

DC Power FC
2024–25 season
- General manager: Jordan Stuart
- Head coach: Phil Nana (interim)
- Stadium: Audi Field, Washington, D.C.
- USL Super League: 7th
- Top goalscorer: Gianna Gourley (5 goals)
- Highest home attendance: 4,719
- Lowest home attendance: 353
- Average home league attendance: 1,490
- Biggest win: 1 Goal Victory (5 games)
- Biggest defeat: 0–3 (vs TB (H), October 2, 2024); 0–3 (vs BKFC (H), November 13, 2024); 0–3(vs LEX (A), December 14, 2024)
- All statistics correct as of 13 May 2025.

The 2024-25 season of DC Power FC was the team's inaugural season as a professional women's soccer team, being one of eight charter clubs in the USL Super League (USLS), one of two leagues to be in the top tier of women's soccer in the United States.

== Players and staff ==
=== Current roster ===
As of March 8, 2025

Note: Flags indicate national team as defined under FIFA eligibility rules; some limited exceptions apply. Players may hold more than one non-FIFA nationality.

No.	Pos.	Nation	Player
1	GK	AUS	Morgan Aquino
2	MF	USA	Anna Bagley
3	DF	USA	Susanna Friedrichs (c)
4	DF	ENG	Abbey-Leigh Stringer
5	FW	USA	Emily Colton
6	MF	GHA	Jennifer Cudjoe
7	MF	PHI	Carleigh Frilles
8	DF	USA	Myra Konte
9	MF	USA	Katie Duong
10	MF	CMR	Jeannette Yango
11	DF	ENG	Nicole Douglas
12	DF	HAI	Claire Constant (c)

No.	Pos.	Nation	Player
13	FW	USA	Gianna Gourley (on loan from Fort Lauderdale United)
14	FW	USA	Phoebe Canoles
15	DF	USA	Amanda Frisbie
17	MF	WAL	Charlie Estcourt
19	MF	JPN	Yuuka Kurosaki
20	MF	USA	Madison Murnin
21	FW	PHI	Katrina Guillou
24	DF	PUR	Amber DiOrio
25	MF	USA	Alex Kirnos
29	DF	USA	Madison Wolfbauer
30	FW	ETH	Loza Abera
33	GK	USA	Adelaide Gay

=== Academy Players ===
As of February 26, 2025

Note: Flags indicate national team as defined under FIFA eligibility rules; some limited exceptions apply. Players may hold more than one non-FIFA nationality.

No.	Pos.	Nation	Player
41	FW	USA	Allie Flanagan
42	MF	USA	Ava Nucci
43	MF	USA	Loretta Talbott
44	GK	USA	Elizabeth Thornton
45	DF	USA	Maleeya Martin
46	MF	USA	Riley Cross
47	MF	PER	Leia Galliani
48	MF	USA	Valentina Perrotta

=== Staff ===
As of July 27, 2024*

Front office
Position	Name
President	(United States) Jordan Stuart
Technical staff
Head Coach	(United States) Phil Nana
Assistant Coach	(United States) Zaneta Wyne

== Transfers ==
=== In ===
Player	Previous Team	Date	Ref.
(United States) Jorian Baucom	(Scotland) Hibernian	June 27, 2024	
(United States) Anna Bagley	(United States) VCU	June 28, 2024	
(United States) Adelaide Gay	(Denmark) Fortuna Hjørring	June 28, 2024	
(Wales) Charlie Estcourt	(United States) Reading	July 10, 2024	
(United States) Mariah Lee	(Australia) Adelaide United	July 10, 2024	
(England) Abbey-Leigh Stringer	(England) West Ham United	July 10, 2024	
(Australia) Morgan Aquino	(Australia) Perth Glory	July 10, 2024	
(Haiti) Claire Constant	(Puerto Rico) Torreense	July 10, 2024	
(Cameroon) Grace Ngock	(France) Guingamp	July 10, 2024	
(Puerto Rico) Amber DiOrio	(Mexico) Pumas	July 11, 2024	
(United States) Susanna Friedrichs	(Italy) Napoli	July 11, 2024	
(Philippines) Katrina Guillou	(Sweden) Hammarby	July 11, 2024	
(United States) Alex Kirnos	(United States) Radford University	July 12, 2024	
(United States) Myra Konte	(United States) Vanderbilt University	July 12, 2024	
(United States) Phoebe Canoles	(United States) Towson University	July 24, 2024	
(United States) Katie Duong	(United States) Minnesota Aurora	July 24, 2024	
(United States) Madison Murnin	(United States) University of Central Florida	August 14, 2024	
(Japan) Yuuka Kurosaki	(United States) Racing Louisville	August 15, 2024	
(Ghana) Jennifer Cudjoe	(United States) NJ/NY Gotham	August 23, 2024	
(United States) Amanda Frisbie	(Spain) Levante Badalona	September 4, 2024	
(United States) Madison Wolfbauer	(United States) Houston Dash	September 4, 2024	
(Ethiopia) Loza Abera	(United States) Virginia Marauders	September 5, 2024	
(England) Nicole Douglas	(England) London City Lionesses	November 1, 2024	
(United States) Emily Colton	(United States) Wake Forest University	January 31, 2025	
(Philippines) Carleigh Frilles	(United States) VCU	March 8, 2025	

=== Out ===
Player	Transferred to	Date	Ref.
(United States) Jorian Baucom	(United States) Fort Lauderdale United	January 27, 2025	
(United States) Mariah Lee	(Canada) Vancouver Rise	February 4, 2025	

=== Loan in ===
No.	Pos.	Player	Loaned from	Start	End	Source
13	FW	(United States) Gianna Gourley	(United States) Fort Lauderdale United	February 11, 2025	June 30, 2025	

== Competitions ==
=== USL Super League ===
==== Regular season standings ====
Pos	Team	Pld	W	L	T	GF	GA	GD	Pts	Qualification
4	Fort Lauderdale United	28	11	8	9	35	33	+2	42 (Note: Head-to-head points: Fort Lauderdale 6, Spokane 3)	Playoffs
5	Spokane Zephyr	28	11	8	9	37	32	+5	42	
6	Brooklyn	28	10	9	9	30	34	−4	39	
7	DC Power	28	5	14	9	24	41	−17	24	
8	Lexington	28	4	18	6	29	62	−33	18	

Source: USL Super League
Rules for classification: 1) head-to-head points; 2) total goal differential; 3) total goals scored; 4) disciplinary points; 5) drawing of lots.

=== 2024 regular season ===
==== Results summary ====
Overall								Home						Away					
Pld	W	D	L	GF	GA	GD	Pts	W	D	L	GF	GA	GD	W	D	L	GF	GA	GD
27	5	8	14	22	37	−15	23	2	4	8	12	21	−9	3	4	6	10	16	−6

==== Matches ====
DC Power FC plans to play their debut season in 2024 with the following schedule:

August 17, 2024 1	Carolina Ascent FC	1–0	DC Power FC	Charlotte, North Carolina
6:00 PM EST	Guion (yellow card) 10'; Bruce 27'; Corbin (yellow card) 90+7'	Report		Stadium: American Legion Memorial Stadium; Attendance: 10,553; Referee: Alexandra Billeter

August 24, 2024 2	Tampa Bay Sun FC	0–0	DC Power FC	Tampa, Florida
6:00 PM EST	Bessette (yellow card) 45+3'; Hendrix (yellow card) 86'; Edmonds (yellow card) 90+4'; Bryan (yellow card) 90+6'	Report	Guillou (yellow card) 5'; Murnin (yellow card) 24'; DiOrio (yellow card) 70'; Friedrichs (yellow card) 90+4'	Stadium: Riverfront Stadium; Attendance: 3,532; Referee: Laura Rodriguez

September 7, 2024 3	Dallas Trinity FC	1–1	DC Power FC	Dallas, Texas
7:00 p.m. CST	Meza 65'	Report	Baucom 29', (yellow card) 78'; Guillou (yellow card) 38'; Murnin (yellow card) 45+2'	Stadium: Cotton Bowl; Attendance: 5,835; Referee: Iryna Petrunok

September 13, 2024 4	DC Power FC	0–2	Fort Lauderdale United FC	Washington, D.C.
7:30 PM EST	Duong (yellow card) 41'; Friedrichs (yellow card) 80'; Wolfbauer (yellow card) 90'	Report	McCain 9'; Hamid 39'	Stadium: Audi Field; Attendance: 4,719; Referee: Adorae Monroy

September 22, 2024 5	Spokane Zephyr FC	1–0	DC Power FC	Spokane, Washington
5:00 PM EST	Thomas 17'; Ekić (yellow card) 25'	Report	Friedrichs (yellow card) 36'; Cudjoe (yellow card) 44'; DiOrio (yellow card) 67'; Guillou (yellow card) 69'	Stadium: One Spokane Stadium; Attendance: 2,384; Referee: Jaclyn Metz

September 29, 2024 6	DC Power FC	2–2	Spokane Zephyr FC	Washington, D.C.
2:00 PM EST	Wolfbauer 6', 43' (pen.), (yellow card) 86'; Guillou (yellow card) 23'; Friedrichs (yellow card) 47'; Bagley (yellow card) 50'	Report	Thomas (yellow card) 5'; Aylmer 6', (yellow card) 60'; DiOrio 70' (o.g.)	Stadium: Audi Field; Attendance: 850; Referee: Shawn Tehini

October 2, 2024 7	DC Power FC	0–3	Tampa Bay Sun	Washington, D.C.
6:30 PM EST	Constant (yellow card) 19'; Martin (yellow card) 27'; Friedrichs (yellow card) 61'	Report	Fløe 56', 68'; Giammona 62'; Listro (yellow card) 90+3'	Stadium: Audi Field; Attendance: 717; Referee: Katherine McCormick
Note: Match originally set for October 4 but rescheduled

October 11, 2024 8	Brooklyn FC	0–1	DC Power FC	New York, New York
	Breslin (yellow card) 87'	Report	Duong (yellow card) 13'; Hill 90+8' (o.g.)	Stadium: Commisso Soccer Stadium; Attendance: 1,284; Referee: Iryna Petrunok
Note: Match originally expected to play at Maimonides Park but changed due to field issues

October 16, 2024 9	DC Power FC	0–0	Dallas Trinity FC	Washington, D.C.
7:30 PM EST	Constant (yellow card) 47'	Report	Ubogagu (yellow card) 85'	Stadium: Audi Field; Attendance: 2,513; Referee: Alexandra Billeter

October 25, 2024 10	DC Power FC	2–1	Lexington SC	Washington, D.C.
8:00 PM EST	Flanagan 52', 90'	Report	McGuire 39'; Yeong (yellow card) 66'	Stadium: Audi Field; Attendance: 1,561; Referee: Jamie Padilla
Note: Match originally scheduled for October 27

November 3, 2024 11	DC Power FC	0–1	Carolina Ascent FC	Washington, D.C.
1:00 PM EST	Constant (yellow card) 45+1'	Report	Studer (yellow card) 12'; Guion 20' (pen.)	Stadium: Audi Field; Attendance: 1,467; Referee: Alyssa Nichols

November 13, 2024 12	DC Power FC	0–3	Brooklyn FC	Washington, D.C.
6:30 PM EST		Report	Pantuso (yellow card) 14'; Grabias 31', 34', 44'; Kroeger (yellow card) 90+1'	Stadium: Audi Field; Attendance: Not reported Referee: Shawn Tehini

November 23, 2024 13	Fort Lauderdale United FC	0–1	DC Power FC	Davie, Florida
7:30 PM EST		Report	Constant (yellow card) 60'; Bagley 90+2'	Stadium: Beyond Bancard Field; Attendance: 1,970; Referee: Gerald Flores

December 14, 2024 14	Lexington SC	3–0	DC Power FC	Lexington, Kentucky
12:00 PM EST	Richardson 45+1', 58'; Wisnewski 56'	Report	Guillou (yellow card) 81'	Stadium: Lexington SC Stadium; Attendance: 1,340; Referee: Eric Tattersall

February 23, 2025 15	Carolina Ascent FC	3–3	DC Power FC	Charlotte, North Carolina
3:00 PM EST	Merrick (yellow card) 27'; Troccoli 40'; Corbin 58'; Wolfbauer 62' (o.g.); Aguilera (yellow card) 77'; Bruce (yellow card) 88'; Baisden (yellow card) 89'	Report	Duong 27' (pen.); Kurosaki 53'; Gourley 83'	Stadium: American Legion Memorial Stadium; Attendance: 2,477; Referee: Adorae Monroy

March 9, 2025 16	DC Power FC	1–2	Lexington SC	Washington, D.C.
2:00 PM EST	Geinore 85'	Report	Mackin 23'; Shepherd (yellow card) 30'; Hannah White 60'	Stadium: Audi Field; Attendance: 1,551; Referee: John Griggs

March 15, 2025 17	Spokane Zephyr FC	3–2	DC Power FC	Spokane, Washington
5:00 PM EST	Murray 36'; Ekic 66' (pen.) 90+3'	Report	Bagley 50'; Gourley 63'	Stadium: One Spokane Stadium; Attendance: 2,073; Referee: Kelsey Harms

March 23, 2025 18	DC Power FC	1–1	Brooklyn FC	Washington, D.C.
2:00 PM EST	Gourley 84'	Report	George 22'; Pickard (yellow card) 29'; Hill (yellow card) 88'	Stadium: Audi Field; Attendance: 2,406; Referee: Jamie Padilla

April 2, 2025 19	Dallas Trinity FC	1–0	DC Power FC	Dallas, Texas
8:00 PM EST	Ubogagu 23'; Davison (yellow card) 62'	Report		Stadium: Cotton Bowl; Attendance: 2,284; Referee: Alyssa Nichols

April 8, 2025 20	DC Power FC	0–1	Carolina Ascent FC	Washington, D.C.
7:30 PM EST	Bagley (yellow card) 65'; Yango (yellow card) 81'	Report	Troccoli (yellow card) 35' (goal) 59'	Stadium: Audi Field; Attendance: 353; Referee: Lauren Aldrich

April 12, 2025 21	Fort Lauderdale United FC	1–1	DC Power FC	Davie, Florida
7:30 PM EST	Hamid (yellow card) 26' (goal) 50'; Locklear (yellow card) 60'	Report	Constant (yellow card) 38'; Gourley 46'; Estcourt (yellow card) 90+8'	Stadium: Beyond Bancard Field; Attendance: 2,173; Referee: Alejo Calume

April 18, 2025 22	DC Power FC	0–1	Tampa Bay Sun FC	Washington, D.C.
7:30 PM EST	Constant (yellow card) 57'	Report	Fløe 88'	Stadium: Audi Field; Attendance: 1,752; Referee: Muhammad Hassan

April 26, 2025 23	Brooklyn FC	0–1	DC Power FC	Brooklyn, New York
6:00 PM EST	Scarpelli (yellow card) 45'	Report	Gourley 37'; Kurosaki (yellow card) 42'; Constant (yellow card) 60'	Stadium: Maimonides Park; Attendance: 1,525; Referee: Joshua Encarnación

May 6, 2025 24	DC Power FC	3–2	Dallas Trinity FC	Washington, D.C.
7:30 PM EST	Konte (yellow card) 31'; Geinore 54', 90+5'; Friedrichs 63'	Report	Strawn 26'; Thornton 33'; Davison (yellow card) 90+8'	Stadium: Audi Field; Attendance: 1,136; Referee: Kaitlyn Trowbridge

May 13, 2025 25	DC Power FC	1–2	Spokane Zephyr FC	Washington, D.C.
7:30 PM EST	Murnin (yellow card) 61'; Aquino (yellow card) 69'; Wolfbauer 74' (pen.)	Report	Ekic 65', 84'; Cummings (yellow card) 73'	Stadium: Audi Field; Attendance: 957; Referee: Alexandra Billeter

May 20, 2025 26	DC Power FC	1–1	Fort Lauderdale United FC	Washington, D.C.
7:30 PM EST	Yango (yellow card) 18'; Abera 45'	Report	McCain (yellow card) 6'; Locklear (yellow card) 46'; McNeill 83'	Stadium: Audi Field; Attendance: 2,095; Referee: Danielle Chesky

May 24, 2025 27	Tampa Bay Sun FC	2–0	DC Power FC	Tampa Bay, Florida
7:00 PM EST	Nasello 22'; Fløe 53'	Report	Wolfbauer (yellow card) 45+3'; Aquino (yellow card) 68'; Gourley (yellow card) 90+5'	Stadium: Riverfront Stadium; Attendance: 4,810; Referee: Jaclyn Metz

May 31, 2025 28	Lexington SC	3–3	DC Power FC	Lexington, Kentucky
7:00 PM EST	Vernis 13'; Parsons 50'; Perez 68'; Jones (yellow card) 70'	Report	Gourley 5', 42' (yellow card) 70'; Geinore 17'; Konte (yellow card) 19'; Stringer (yellow card) 55'; Kurosaki (yellow card) 70'; Murnin (yellow card) 89'	Stadium: Lexington SC Stadium; Attendance: 2,003; Referee: Rachel Swett

== Statistics ==
=== Appearances ===
As of match played 24 May 2025

No.	Player	Nat.	Total		Regular Season		Playoffs	
No.	Player	Nat.	Apps	Starts	Apps	Starts	Apps	Starts
Goalkeepers
1	Morgan Aquino	(Australia)	21	21	21	21	DNQ	
33	Adelaide Gay	(United States)	6	5	6	5	DNQ	
Defenders
3	Susanna Friedrichs	(United States)	26	26	26	26	DNQ	
4	Abbey-Leigh Stringer	(England)	2	2	2	2	DNQ	
8	Myra Konte	(United States)	11	3	11	3	DNQ	
12	Claire Constant	(Haiti)	19	18	19	18	DNQ	
20	Madison Murnin	(United States)	14	13	14	13	DNQ	
24	Amber DiOrio	(Puerto Rico)	19	16	19	16	DNQ	
29	Madison Wolfbauer	(United States)	25	24	25	24	DNQ	
Midfielders
2	Anna Bagley	(United States)	26	21	26	21	DNQ	
5	Emily Colton	(United States)	11	9	11	9	DNQ	
6	Jennifer Cudjoe	(Ghana)	18	10	18	10	DNQ	
7	Carleigh Frilles	(Philippines)	8	4	8	4	DNQ	
9	Katie Duong	(United States)	26	23	26	23	DNQ	
10	Grace Ngock	(Cameroon)	17	12	17	12	DNQ	
17	Charlie Estcourt	(Wales)	15	8	15	8	DNQ	
19	Yuuka Kurosaki	(Japan)	21	14	21	14	DNQ	
23	Zaneta Wyne	(United States)	1	0	1	0	DNQ	
25	Alex Kimos	(United States)	5	1	5	1	DNQ	
30	Loza Geinore	(Ethiopia)	21	9	21	9	DNQ	
41	Allie Flanagan	(United States)	4	2	4	2	DNQ	
43	Loretta Talbott	(United States)	2	0	2	0	DNQ	
45	Maleeya Martin	(United States)	5	2	5	2	DNQ	
46	Riley Cross	(United States)	5	2	5	2	DNQ	
47	Valentina Perrotta	(United States)	3	1	3	1	DNQ	
48	Leia Francesca Galliani	(Peru)	1	0	1	0	DNQ	
50	Caroline Helfrich	(United States)	2	0	2	0	DNQ	
Forwards
11	Nicole Douglas	(England)	6	5	6	5	DNQ	
13	Gianna Gourley	(United States)	11	10	11	10	DNQ	
14	Phoebe Canoles	(United States)	1	0	1	0	DNQ	
21	Katrina Guillou	(Philippines)	17	9	17	9	DNQ	
Other players (Departed during season)
5	Jorian Baucom	(United States)	12	11	12	11	DNQ	
7	Mariah Lee	(United States)	12	6	12	6	DNQ	

=== Goalscorers ===
Last updated 24 May 2025

Rank	Nat.	Player	Regular Season	Playoffs	Total
1	(United States)	Gianna Gourley	5	0	5
2	(United States)	Madison Wolfbauer	3	0	3
2	(Ethiopia)	Loza Abera	4	0	4
4	(United States)	Allie Flanagan	2	0	2
4	(United States)	Anna Bagley	2	0	2
6	(United States)	Jorian Baucom	1	0	1
6	(United States)	Katie Duong	1	0	1
6	(Japan)	Yuuka Kurosaki	1	0	1
6	(United States)	Susanna Friedrichs	1	0	1
6	Own Goals		1	0	1
Total			18	0	18

=== Assists ===
Last updated 24 May 2025

Rank	Nat.	Player	Regular Season	Playoffs	Total
1	(United States)	Katie Duong	3	0	3
2	(United States)	Susanna Friedrichs	2	0	2
3	(Haiti)	Claire Constant	1	0	1
3	(United States)	Emily Colton	1	0	1
Total			7	0	7

=== Clean sheets ===
Last updated 24 May 2025

Rank	Nat.	Player	Regular Season	Playoffs	Total
1	(Australia)	Morgan Aquino	5	0	5
Total			5	0	5

=== Disciplinary record ===
As of final match played 24 May 2025
Player name(s) in italics transferred out mid-season.

Name	Regular Season		Playoffs		Total	
Name	Booked	Sent off (straight red)	Booked	Sent off (straight red)	Booked	Sent off (straight red)
(Haiti) Claire Constant	7	0	0	0	7	0
(United States) Susanna Friedrichs	5	0	0	0	5	0
(Philippines) Katrina Guillou	4	0	0	0	4	0
(United States) Madison Murnin	3	0	0	0	3	0
(United States) Amber DiOrio	3	0	0	0	3	0
(United States) Madison Wolfbauer	3	0	0	0	3	0
(United States) Katelyn Duong	2	0	0	0	2	0
(United States) Anna Bagley	2	0	0	0	2	0
(United States) Jorian Baucom	2	0	0	0	2	0
(Ghana) Jennifer Cudjoe	1	0	0	0	1	0
(United States) Haley Thomas	1	0	0	0	1	0
(United States) Maleeya Martin	1	0	0	0	1	0
(Cameroon) Jeannette Yango	2	0	0	0	2	0
(Japan) Yuuka Kurosaki	1	0	0	0	1	0
(Australia) Morgan Aquino	2	0	0	0	2	0
(United States) Myra Konte	1	0	0	0	1	0
(United States) Gianna Gourley	1	0	0	0	1	0
Total	40	0	0	0	40	0
