= Phoebe Canoles =

American soccer player (born 2001)

Personal information
- Full name: Phoebe Nicole Canoles
- Date of birth: August 1, 2001 (age 25)
- Place of birth: Baltimore, Maryland, U.S.
- Height: 5 ft 7 in (1.70 m)
- Positions: Forward; midfielder

Youth career
- Coppermine SC

College career
Years	Team	Apps	(Gls)
2019–2023	Towson Tigers	71	(21)

Senior career*
Years	Team	Apps	(Gls)
2024–2025	DC Power FC	1	(0)
- * Club domestic league appearances and goals as of June 18, 2025

Phoebe Nicole Canoles (born August 1, 2001) is an American professional soccer player who plays as a forward or midfielder. She played five seasons of college soccer for the Towson Tigers.

== Early life ==
Canoles was born in Baltimore, Maryland, one of three children born to parents Jimmy and Renae Canoles. She was a four-year varsity starter for the Perry Hall High School soccer team, captaining the team for two years and helping the team to one state championship and two regionals. Along the way, Canoles was named to the Maryland All-State youth team on three separate occasions. She played club soccer for Coppermine SC, winning the US Youth Soccer National Championships in 2019 as a member of Coppermine's Premier Navy 2001 squad.

== College career ==
In 2019, Canoles followed in the footsteps of her father, Jimmy, and joined the Towson Tigers soccer program. She played 5 games in her freshman season before tearing her ACL and redshirting the remainder of the year. She did not play again until the 2021 spring season, at which point she began to play as a center back at the behest of Towson coach Katherine Vettori. Canoles started all 8 games of the shortened season and was named to the All-CAA Rookie Team and All-CAA Third Teams. She kicked off her third year with a bang, scoring in each of Towson's opening two games. She was also named team captain, a role which she retained throughout the remainder of her college career. Once again, Canoles started each of the Tigers' matches and was named to the conference third team.

Canoles had a breakout season in 2022. She led the team in assists and was second-highest in both goals and points. She also took a step up by receiving an All-CAA Second Team honor. She built upon her momentum in 2023 and contributed to a CAA tournament victory, notably by scoring the game-winning goal in the final. The CAA victory also helped Towson earn a spot in the NCAA tournament for the first time in program history. Canoles was recognized for her efforts by receiving a spot on the All-CAA First Team, winning the accolade for the first time. She ended her college career with 21 goals and 24 assists in 71 games.

== Club career ==
=== DC Power FC ===
Despite having an extra year of NCAA eligibility due to the COVID-19 pandemic, Canoles chose to leave college and join the professional ranks in 2024. She signed her first professional contract on July 24, joining DC Power FC ahead of the inaugural USL Super League season. She made her professional debut in the league's first-ever match, coming on as a second-half substitute for Mariah Lee in a 1–0 loss to Carolina Ascent FC.

== Career statistics ==
=== Club ===
As of May 5, 2025

Appearances and goals by club, season and competition
Club	Season	League			Cup		Playoffs		Total	
Club	Season	Division	Apps	Goals	Apps	Goals	Apps	Goals	Apps	Goals
DC Power FC	2024–25	USL Super League	1	0	—		—		1	0
Career total			1	0	0	0	0	0	1	0
