= Gianna Gourley =

American soccer player (born 2001)

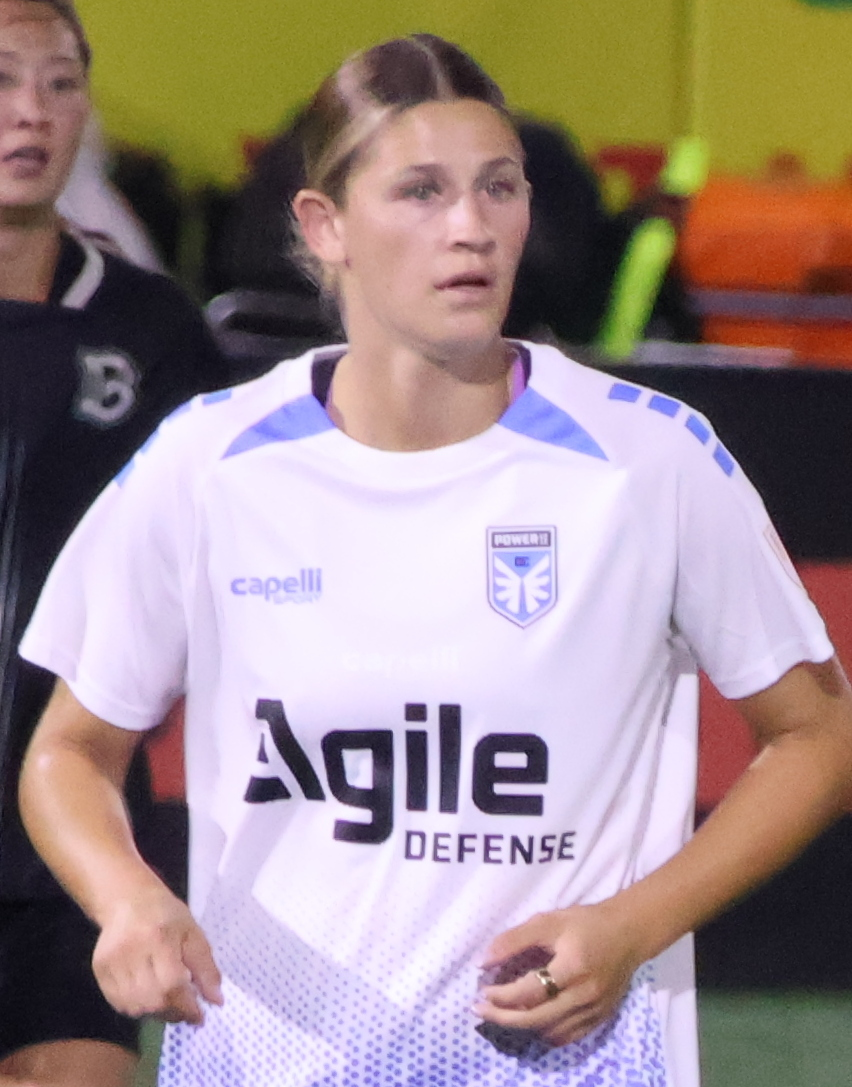
- Gourley with DC Power FC in 2026

Personal information
- Full name: Gianna Marie Gourley
- Date of birth: January 23, 2001 (age 25)
- Place of birth: Las Vegas, Nevada, U.S.
- Height: 5 ft 9 in (1.75 m)
- Position: Forward

Team information
- Current team: DC Power FC
- Number: 13

Youth career
- 2016–2019: Heat FC

College career
Years	Team	Apps	(Gls)
2019–2021	Iowa Hawkeyes	35	(6)
2021–2023	Grand Canyon Antelopes	62	(46)

Senior career*
Years	Team	Apps	(Gls)
2024–2025	Fort Lauderdale United	9	(0)
2025	→ DC Power FC (loan)	14	(7)
2025–	DC Power FC	23	(8)
- * Club domestic league appearances and goals as of 01:43, May 18, 2026 (UTC)

Gianna Marie Gourley (born January 23, 2001) is an American professional soccer player who plays as a forward for DC Power FC of the USL Super League. She played college soccer for the Iowa Hawkeyes and the Grand Canyon Antelopes.

== Early life ==
Gourley was born and raised in Las Vegas, Nevada. She played club soccer for Heat FC 01 in the ECNL. Gourley attended Bishop Gorman High School, where she played both soccer and basketball. She led the soccer team to two Nevada 4A state titles and one undefeated season. As a senior, she scored 28 goals, earned TopDrawerSoccer High School All-American honors, and was named Nevada's Gatorade Player of the Year. Gourley had also been named to the All-State team the year prior.

== College career ==
=== Iowa Hawkeyes ===
Getting off to a quick start, Gourley recorded two goals and two assists in her first six games with the Iowa Hawkeyes. She scored 3 more goals and had 19 total appearances (8 starts) in her freshman year. At the end of the season, Gourley was named to the Big Ten All-Freshman team, becoming the first Hawkeye to do so since 2016.

=== Grand Canyon Antelopes ===
After playing two seasons with Iowa, Gourley transferred to Grand Canyon University and began play with the Antelopes in 2021. She scored her first goal with GCU on August 27, 2021, netting the game-winner in a victory over the Incarnate World Cardinals. She continued to find the back of the net, recording a four-minute hat-trick against Dixie State on September 25 and subsequently being named the WAC Offensive Player of the Week. In 2022, Gourley registered the best offensive season of any player in Grand Canyon history, ranking fifth in the nation in points and goals. In her final season, she was named to the All-American third team, her first national honor. Gourley completed her career at GCU with 62 appearances, 46 goals, and three consecutive All-WAC team honors.

== Club career ==
=== Fort Lauderdale United ===
On May 16, 2024, Gourley signed her first professional contract with Fort Lauderdale United FC of the USL Super League ahead of the league's inaugural season. She started and played 90 minutes in the club's first-ever match as a franchise, a 1–1 draw with Spokane Zephyr FC on August 17. Gourley played in 9 matches with Fort Lauderdale United before being loaned out.

=== DC Power ===
On February 11, 2025, Fort Lauderdale United sent Gourley to fellow USL Super League team DC Power FC on a four-month loan with the option for a permanent transfer. She made her debut and scored her first goal for DC Power on February 23, the sixth goal in a 3–3 draw with Carolina Ascent FC. Gourley continued to convert chances, scoring in two of her next three matches with DC Power. She was subsequently named to the league's March team of the month for her efforts. Gourley went on to register 7 total goals in 14 appearances with DC Power, averaging a goal every other game.

After leading DC in goals and shots, Gourley joined the club on a permanent transfer on July 9, 2025. In the first half of the 2025–26 campaign, she scored eight goals, the second-highest in the league. She also recorded three USL Super League Team of the Month honors. On January 13, 2026, she re-signed with DC through the 2026–27 season.

== Career statistics ==
=== Club ===
As of January 13, 2026

Appearances and goals by club, season and competition
Club	Season	League			Cup		Playoffs		Total	
Club	Season	Division	Apps	Goals	Apps	Goals	Apps	Goals	Apps	Goals
Fort Lauderdale United FC	2024–25	USL Super League	9	0	—		—		9	0
DC Power FC (loan)	2024–25	USL Super League	14	7	—		—		14	7
DC Power FC	2025–26	USL Super League	14	8	—		—		14	8
Career total			37	15	0	0	0	0	37	15
