= Myra Konte =

American soccer player (born 1998)

Personal information
- Full name: Myra Konte
- Date of birth: October 13, 1998 (age 28)
- Place of birth: Woodbridge, Virginia, U.S.
- Height: 5 ft 7 in (1.70 m)
- Position: Defender

Youth career
- Braddock Road

College career
Years	Team	Apps	(Gls)
2017–2021	Vanderbilt Commodores	63	(3)

Senior career*
Years	Team	Apps	(Gls)
2024–2025	DC Power FC	13	(0)
- * Club domestic league appearances and goals as of June 18, 2025

Myra Konte (born October 13, 1998) is an American professional soccer player who plays as a defender. She played college soccer for the Vanderbilt Commodores before being selected by the North Carolina Courage 30th overall in the 2021 NWSL Draft.

== Early life ==
Konte was born and raised in Woodbridge, Virginia. She began playing soccer at the age of 6 and eventually attended Osbourn Park High School. She did not play high school soccer and instead spent her time with youth club teams PWSI and Braddock Road.

== College career ==
Konte matriculated at Vanderbilt University, where she played soccer with the Commodores for five seasons. In her freshman year, she made 22 appearances, starting all but one game. She was named to the SEC All-Freshman and All-Tournament teams at the end of the year. Konte scored her first collegiate goal on August 25, 2018, helping the Commodores secure victory over the Miami Hurricanes. As a junior, Konte started all 8 of her team's opening games before tearing her ACL during a match in September 2019. However, she bounced back the following season and helped Vanderbilt win the SEC Tournament for the first time in 26 years. Konte stood out throughout the competition and was named the tournament MVP. On January 13, 2021, she was selected in the third round of the 2021 NWSL Draft by the North Carolina Courage, making her the first Commodore to ever be drafted into the National Women's Soccer League. Ultimately, she chose to return to Vanderbilt for an extra year and recorded 2 additional appearances to round out her collegiate career.

== Club career ==
=== DC Power FC ===
Despite having her rights held by the North Carolina Courage, Konte did not end up signing in the NWSL. Instead, over three years after being drafted, she signed her first professional contract with DC Power FC ahead of the inaugural USL Super League season. She made her professional debut on October 25, 2024, in a 3–0 loss to Lexington SC. One month later, Konte made her first start with DC Power in an away win over Fort Lauderdale United FC. She made a total of 13 appearances in her first professional season, including 5 starts. At the end of the campaign, DC Power chose to decline Konte's contract option, and she departed the club.

== International career ==
Konte received her first call-up to the United States under-18 team for a training camp in May 2016. She was also summoned to a camp in Chula Vista, California in September of the same year.

== Career statistics ==
=== Club ===
As of May 11, 2025

Appearances and goals by club, season, and competition
Club	Season	League			Cup		Playoffs		Total	
Club	Season	Division	Apps	Goals	Apps	Goals	Apps	Goals	Apps	Goals
DC Power FC	2024–25	USL Super League	9	0	—		—		9	0
Career total			9	0	0	0	0	0	9	0
