= Abbey-Leigh Stringer =

English footballer (born 1995)

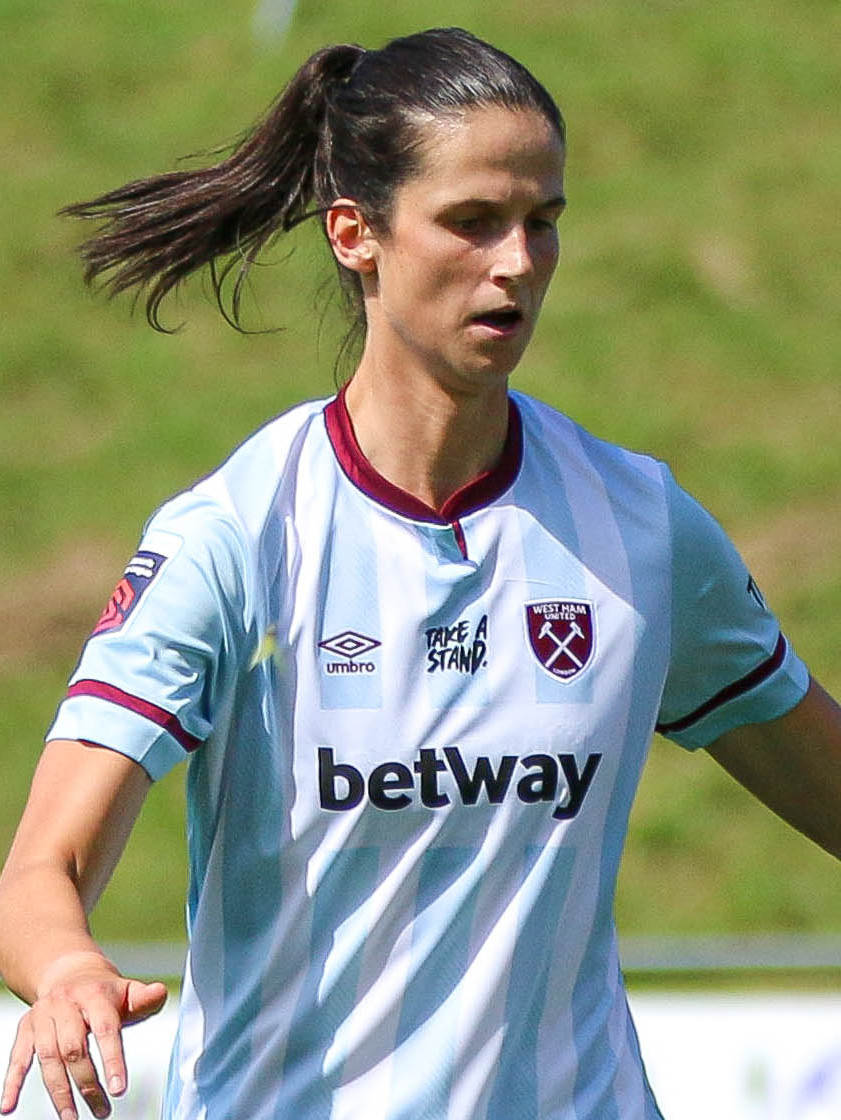
- Stringer with West Ham United in 2021

Personal information
- Full name: Abbey-Leigh Stringer
- Date of birth: 17 May 1995 (age 31)
- Place of birth: Nuneaton, England
- Height: 1.83 m (6 ft 0 in)
- Position: Midfielder

Team information
- Current team: Brooklyn FC
- Number: 24

Youth career
- Aston Villa

Senior career*
Years	Team	Apps	(Gls)
2014–2018	Birmingham City	37	(0)
2015	→ Aston Villa (loan)	5	(0)
2018–2021	Everton	40	(1)
2021–2024	West Ham United	37	(1)
2024–2025	DC Power FC	3	(0)
2025–2026	Burnley	5	(0)
2026	→ Loughborough Lightning (loan)	4	(0)
2026–	Brooklyn FC	0	(0)

International career^{‡}
2010–2012	England U17	9	(2)
2012–2014	England U19	14	(0)
2014	England U20	3	(0)
2015	England U23	2	(0)
- * Club domestic league appearances and goals as of 04:07, 28 October 2026 (UTC) ‡ National team caps and goals as of 28 May 2017

Abbey-Leigh Stringer (born 17 May 1995) is an English professional footballer who plays as a midfielder for USL Super League club Brooklyn FC.

== Club career ==
Stringer spent her youth development with Aston Villa's center of excellence. Her performances and development there earned her call-ups for England's youth national teams at various levels.

In June 2014, Stringer signed with WSL 1 side and cross-town rivals, Birmingham City After limited appearances for Birmingham, she was loaned back to Aston Villa in July 2015 to gain more experience and develop her skills.

At the conclusion of her loan spell, she returned to Birmingham and signed a professional deal in January 2016. During her time with Birmingham she would make 37 league appearances, 6 WSL Cup appearances, and help the Blues finish as runners up in the 2016 WSL Cup and the 2016–17 FA Women's Cup.

In August 2018, Stringer signed for Everton. Stringer went on to having a 40 match spell with Everton. She scored 1 goal.

Stringer then moved to West Ham United in 2021. She played 37 matches and scored 1 goal.

In July 2024, Stringer was announced as a member of the inaugural roster for USL Super League club DC Power FC.

On 1 August 2025, Stringer signed with Burnley F.C. Women. She made 10 appearances across all competitions before getting loaned out to fellow FAWNL side Loughborough Lightning through the end of the season in February 2026.

Stringer returned to the USL Super League in October 2026, signing for Brooklyn FC for the final month of the 2026 season.

== International career ==
Stringer has made appearances for various youth levels of the England national team from U-17s through U-23s. She contributed 2 starts and 3 appearances for England during their runner-up finish in the 2013 UEFA Women's Under-19 Championship.

== Career statistics ==
=== Club ===
As of match played 24 August 2024

Appearances and goals by club, season and competition
Club	Season	League			National Cup (Note: Includes Women's FA Cup)		League Cup (Note: Includes FA Women's League Cup)		Total	
Club	Season	Division	Apps	Goals	Apps	Goals	Apps	Goals	Apps	Goals
Birmingham City	2014	Women's Super League	3	0	0	0	1	0	4	0
Birmingham City	2015	Women's Super League	2	0	0	0	0	0	2	0
Birmingham City	2016	Women's Super League	14	0	?	?	3	0	17	0
Birmingham City	2017	Women's Super League	7	0	?	?	—		7	0
Birmingham City	2017–18	Women's Super League	11	0	?	?	2	0	13	0
Birmingham City	Total		37	0	?	?	6	0	43	0
Aston Villa (loan)	2015	Women's Super League 2	5	0	0	0	5	0	10	0
Everton	2018–19	Women's Super League	15	1	1	0	2	0	18	1
Everton	2019–20	Women's Super League	11	0	5	0	2	0	18	0
Everton	2020–21	Women's Super League	14	0	0	0	3	0	17	0
Everton	Total		40	1	6	0	7	0	53	1
West Ham United	2021–22	Women's Super League	18	1	3	0	4	0	25	1
West Ham United	2022–23	Women's Super League	11	0	0	0	3	0	14	0
West Ham United	2023–24	Women's Super League	8	0	0	0	3	0	10	0
West Ham United	Total		37	1	3	0	10	0	49	0
DC Power FC	2024–25	USL Super League	2	0	—		—		2	0
Career total			121	2	9	0	23	0	153	2
