= Jorian Baucom =

American soccer player (born 1996)

- Baucom in 2025

Personal information
- Full name: Jorian Nicole Baucom
- Date of birth: August 4, 1996 (age 30)
- Place of birth: Scottsdale, Arizona, United States
- Height: 5 ft 9 in (1.75 m)
- Position: Forward

Team information
- Current team: Calgary Wild
- Number: 4

Youth career
- 2005–2012: Sereno SC
- 2012–2013: SC del Sol

College career
Years	Team	Apps	(Gls)
2014–2016	LSU Tigers	61	(33)
2017–2018	Colorado Buffaloes	20	(12)

Senior career*
Years	Team	Apps	(Gls)
2019	Houston Dash	0	(0)
2019–2020	Sparta Prague		
2020–2021	MSV Duisburg	7	(3)
2021	Racing Louisville	12	(0)
2022	North Carolina Courage	6	(0)
2022	Damaiense	18	(5)
2023–2024	Hibernian	32	(25)
2024	DC Power FC	13	(1)
2025	Fort Lauderdale United	14	(0)
2025–	Calgary Wild	37	(9)
- * Club domestic league appearances and goals as of October 28, 2026

Jorian Nicole Baucom (born August 4, 1996) is an American professional soccer player who plays as a forward for Northern Super League club Calgary Wild FC.

== Early life ==
Born in Scottsdale, Arizona, Baucom began her career with Sereno Soccer Club in 2005 before joining SC del Sol in 2012. She also represented her high school soccer team, Pinnacle High School, where she led them to the state final in 2014 after scoring a team-high 26 goals.

== College career ==
In 2014, Baucom enrolled at Louisiana State University where she played college soccer for the LSU Tigers. She made her collegiate debut on August 22, 2014, against the Troy Trojans where she scored her first goal after just 48 seconds. She finished her first season 8 goals in 20 matches, being awarded as the SEC Freshman of the Year. She played two more seasons with the Tigers before transferring to the University of Colorado and playing with the Colorado Buffaloes. She sat out the 2017 season in order to recover from knee surgery during the offseason before returning as a red shirt senior in 2018, scoring 12 goals, the second most in Buffaloes history.

== Club career ==
On June 20, 2019, Baucom signed with National Women's Soccer League club Houston Dash as a national team replacement player. She spent a couple months with the Dash before signing with Czech Women's First League club AC Sparta Prague. She made her international club debut for Sparta in the UEFA Women's Champions League on September 11, 2019, against Breiðablik, coming on as a substitute during a 3–2 defeat.

On October 8, 2020, Baucom signed with Frauen-Bundesliga club MSV Duisburg. She made her debut for the club on October 10 against Turbine Potsdam, starting and scoring in the 37th minute of a 3–2 defeat.

On April 5, 2021, Baucom joined National Women's Soccer League club Racing Louisville after training with the club during pre-season. She made her professional debut for the club on April 10, 2021, against Orlando Pride, coming on as a 78th-minute substitute in a 2–2 draw.

On December 14, 2021, Baucom joined the North Carolina Courage after being picked from the waiver wire. After making six appearances for the Courage, the team waived her on August 3, 2022, so she could play outside of the NWSL.

Baucom signed with Damaiense during the 2022 summer transfer window. She debuted with the Portuguese club on September 4, 2022, and scored her first goal for Damaiense on September 18, 2022.

On June 27, 2024, Baucom was announced as the first player for USL Super League club DC Power FC. Baucom scored the first goal in team history on September 7, in a 1–1 draw with Dallas Trinity.

In January 2025, Baucom joined Fort Lauderdale United FC.

On July 24, 2025, Baucom signed for Calgary Wild FC of the Northern Super League. On July 27, 2025, she made her debut in a match against Montreal Roses FC.

== International career ==
Baucom has trained with or represented the United States at the under-15, under-16, under-19, and under-20 levels.

== Career statistics ==
As of October 28, 2026

Appearances and goals by club, season and competition
Club	Season	League			Playoffs (Note: Includes NWSL playoffs and USL Super League playoffs)		Cup		Continental		Total	
Club	Season	Division	Apps	Goals	Apps	Goals	Apps	Goals	Apps	Goals	Apps	Goals
Houston Dash	2019	NWSL	0	0	—		0	0	—		0	0
AC Sparta Prague	2019–20	Czech Women's First League	0	0	—		—		1	0	1	0
MSV Duisburg	2020–21	Frauen-Bundesliga	7	3	—		2	1	—		9	4
Racing Louisville	2021	NWSL	8	0	—		3	0	—		11	0
North Carolina Courage	2022	NWSL	6	0	—		1	0	—		7	0
Damaiense	2022–23	Campeonato Nacional de Futebol Feminino	18	5	—		6	1	—		24	6
Hiberian	2023–24	SWPL	32	25	—		0	0	0	0	32	25
DC Power FC	2024–25	USL Super League	13	1	—		—		—		13	1
Fort Lauderdale United FC	2024–25	USL Super League	14	0	2	0	0	0	0	0	16	0
Calgary Wild FC	2025	Northern Super League	13	2	—		—		—		13	2
Calgary Wild FC	2026	Northern Super League	24	7	—		1	0	—		25	7
Calgary Wild FC	Total		37	9	0	0	1	0	0	0	38	9
Career total			135	43	2	0	13	2	1	0	151	45
