= Nicole Douglas =

English footballer (born 2000)

Personal information
- Full name: Nicole Stephanie Douglas
- Date of birth: 31 July 2000 (age 26)
- Place of birth: London, England
- Height: 1.70 m (5 ft 7 in)
- Positions: Forward; midfielder

Team information
- Current team: Grótta
- Number: 23

Youth career
- 2006–2018: Chelsea

College career
Years	Team	Apps	(Gls)
2018–2022	Arizona State Sun Devils	89	(60)

Senior career*
Years	Team	Apps	(Gls)
2022	SC del Sol		(12)
2023	Washington Spirit	10	(0)
2024	London City Lionesses	1	(0)
2024–2025	DC Power FC	5	(0)
2026–	Grótta	12	(10)

International career
2016–2017	England U17	8	(5)
2018–2019	England U19	2	(0)
- * Club domestic league appearances and goals as of 14:58, 24 July 2026 (UTC)

Nicole Stephanie Douglas (born 31 July 2000) is an English professional footballer who plays for 1. deild kvenna team Grótta. She previously played for Arizona State University, Washington Spirit, London City Lionesses, and DC Power FC, as well as the England under-17 and under-19 national teams.

== Early life ==
Douglas was born on 31 July 2000 in London. She attended St Paul's College and Arizona State University.

== College career ==
Douglas graduated as Arizona State's all-time leading scorer after she broke a two-decade-old record of 50 goals. She finished her career at Arizona State with 60 goals. In 2021, she was named to the All-Pac-12 Conference First Team and as a third-team All-American, the program's first since 2002.

== Club career ==
Douglas was selected 26th overall in the 2023 NWSL Draft by Washington Spirit.

On 23 January 2024, it was announced that Douglas would join Women's Championship side London City Lionesses on a free transfer.

On 1 November 2024, Douglas joined DC Power FC ahead of the inaugural USL Super League season.

In early 2026, Douglas signed for Grótta in 1. deild kvenna, Iceland's second-tier women's football league. She made her club debut in an Icelandic Women's Football League Cup match on 18 March 2026.

== International career ==
Douglas played for the England under-17 national team from 2016 to 2017 and for the under-19 team from 2018 to 2019.

== Career statistics ==
As of 30 March 2025

Appearances and goals by club, season and competition
Club	Season	League			Cup (Note: Includes the NWSL Challenge Cup, Women's FA Cup, and FA Women's League Cup)		Total	
Club	Season	Division	Apps	Goals	Apps	Goals	Apps	Goals
SC del Sol	2022	WPSL		12	—			12
Washington Spirit	2023	NWSL	10	0	6	0	16	0
London City Lionesses	2023–24	Women's Championship	4	0	3	0	7	0
DC Power FC	2024–25	USL Super League	3	0	—		3	0
Career total			+	12	9	0	26+	12

== See also ==
- List of foreign NWSL players
- List of National Women's Soccer League draftees by college team
