= Jaydah Bedoya =

Puerto Rican footballer (born 2002)

Personal information
- Full name: Jaydah Marie Bedoya
- Date of birth: March 20, 2002 (age 24)
- Place of birth: New Bedford, Massachusetts, U.S.
- Height: 1.65 m (5 ft 5 in)
- Position: Forward

Youth career
- New Bedford Whalers
- Tabor Seawolves

College career
Years	Team	Apps	(Gls)
2020–2022	UConn Huskies	43	(9)
2023	West Virginia Mountaineers	18	(0)

Senior career*
Years	Team	Apps	(Gls)
2024–2025	Carolina Ascent	22	(3)
2025–2026	DC Power FC	19	(3)

International career^{‡}
2022–2024	Ecuador	3	(0)
2025–	Puerto Rico	1	(0)
- * Club domestic league appearances and goals as of May 17, 2026 ‡ National team caps and goals as of December 1, 2025

Jaydah Marie Bedoya (born March 20, 2002) is a professional footballer who plays as a forward. Born in the mainland United States, she represents Puerto Rico internationally. She played college soccer for the UConn Huskies and the West Virginia Mountaineers before starting her professional career with USL Super League clubs Carolina Ascent FC and DC Power FC. She is a former Ecuador international.

== Early life ==
Bedoya was raised in New Bedford, Massachusetts, United States. Her father is Ecuadorian and her mother is Puerto Rican.

== Club career ==
In May 2024, Bedoya signed with USL Super League club Carolina Ascent FC. Bedoya was named to the league's team of the Month in October and November 2024.

In July 2025, DC Power FC announced they had signed Bedoya ahead of the 2025–26 season. Bedoya went on to score three goals in 19 appearances for DC as the team failed to qualify for the playoffs for the second year in a row. In June 2026, Power FC opted to decline Bedoya's contract option, releasing her after one season.

== International career ==
Bedoya made her senior debut for Ecuador on February 22, 2022. She only appeared in friendlies and continued attending the national team until the February 2024 FIFA window.

Bedoya made her senior debut for Puerto Rico on December 1, 2025, and became cap-tied by playing in an official match at age 23.

== Honors ==
Carolina Ascent

- USL Super League Players' Shield: 2024–25

== See also ==
- List of association footballers who have been capped for two senior national teams
