= Madison Wolfbauer =

American soccer player (born 1999)

Personal information
- Full name: Madison Elise Wolfbauer
- Date of birth: August 2, 1999 (age 27)
- Place of birth: Dearborn, Michigan, United States
- Height: 5 ft 9 in (1.75 m)
- Positions: Center back; striker

Team information
- Current team: Rio Ave

College career
Years	Team	Apps	(Gls)
2017–2018	Illinois Fighting Illini	12	(1)
2020–2021	Bowling Green Falcons	29	(15)

Senior career*
Years	Team	Apps	(Gls)
2022	Thonon Evian		
2022	ÍBV	8	(1)
2023	Keflavík	21	(1)
2024	Houston Dash	0	(0)
2024–2025	DC Power FC	26	(3)
2025–	Rio Ave	0	(0)
- * Club domestic league appearances and goals as of June 18, 2025

Madison Elise Wolfbauer (born August 2, 1999) is an American professional soccer player who plays as a center back for Campeonato Nacional Feminino club Rio Ave. She played college soccer for the Illinois Fighting Illini and the Bowling Green Falcons. She has previously played for Thonon Evian, ÍBV, Keflavík, the Houston Dash, and DC Power FC.

== Early life ==
Wolfbauer was born in Dearborn, Michigan, to Robert and Jamie Wolfbauer. Her father played college football at North Dakota State, and her mother played soccer at Schoolcraft. She has a younger sister, Mia, who played college soccer for Grand Valley State and Madonna University. Wolfbauer grew up in Canton, Michigan, and attended Canton High School, where she captained the basketball team as a senior. She played club soccer as a midfielder for the Michigan Hawks, winning the under-18/19 ECNL championship in 2017.

== College career ==
Wolfbauer dealt with injury during two seasons with the Illinois Fighting Illini, redshirting her first year and maing 10 appearances as a sophomore in 2018. She then transferred to the Bowling Green Falcons in 2019 but tore her ACL and meniscus before the season. Following her recovery, she started every game in the spring of 2021, leading the Green Falcons in scoring with five goals in eight games. She helped Bowling Green win the Mid-American Conference tournament, qualifying for the NCAA tournament, and was named first-team All-MAC and Bowling Green State University's comeback player of the year across all sports. Wolfbauer captained the Falcons in her second and final season with the team in the fall of 2021, leading the conference in scoring with ten goals. She was named the MAC offensive player of the year, first-team All-MAC, and MAC all-tournament after winning a second tournament title.

== Club career ==
Wolfbauer began her professional career with French Division 2 Féminine club Thonon Evian Grand Genève at the start of 2022. On July 26, she moved to Icelandic Besta deild kvenna club ÍBV for the rest of the 2022 season, recording one goal and one assist in eight appearances. At the end of the year, Wolfbauer followed ÍBV head coach Jonathan Glenn to fellow league club Keflavík for the 2023 season. Having been converted from striker to defender, she scored two goals in 23 appearances in all competitions.

Wolfbauer returned to the United States to play for the North Carolina Courage–sponsored team in the Soccer Tournament (TST) in June 2024, helping lead the team to the final. She received the Golden Boot as the tournament's top scorer with five goals, including both goals the in semifinals. The next month, Wolfbauer signed a national team replacement contract with National Women's Soccer League club Houston Dash and debuted as a substitute in a Summer Cup game against the Kansas City Current on July 20.

Wolfbauer signed with USL Super League club DC Power FC on September 4, 2024. She made her club debut in a 1–1 draw with Dallas Trinity on September 7. Later in the month, she scored DC's first two home goals, with the help of two penalties, in a 2–2 draw with the Spokane Zephyr. She ranked second in minutes played for DC during their inaugural season behind only Susanna Fitch.

In August 2025, Wolfbauer signed with newly promoted Campeonato Nacional Feminino club Rio Ave.
