= Katrina Guillou =

Filipino footballer (born 1993)

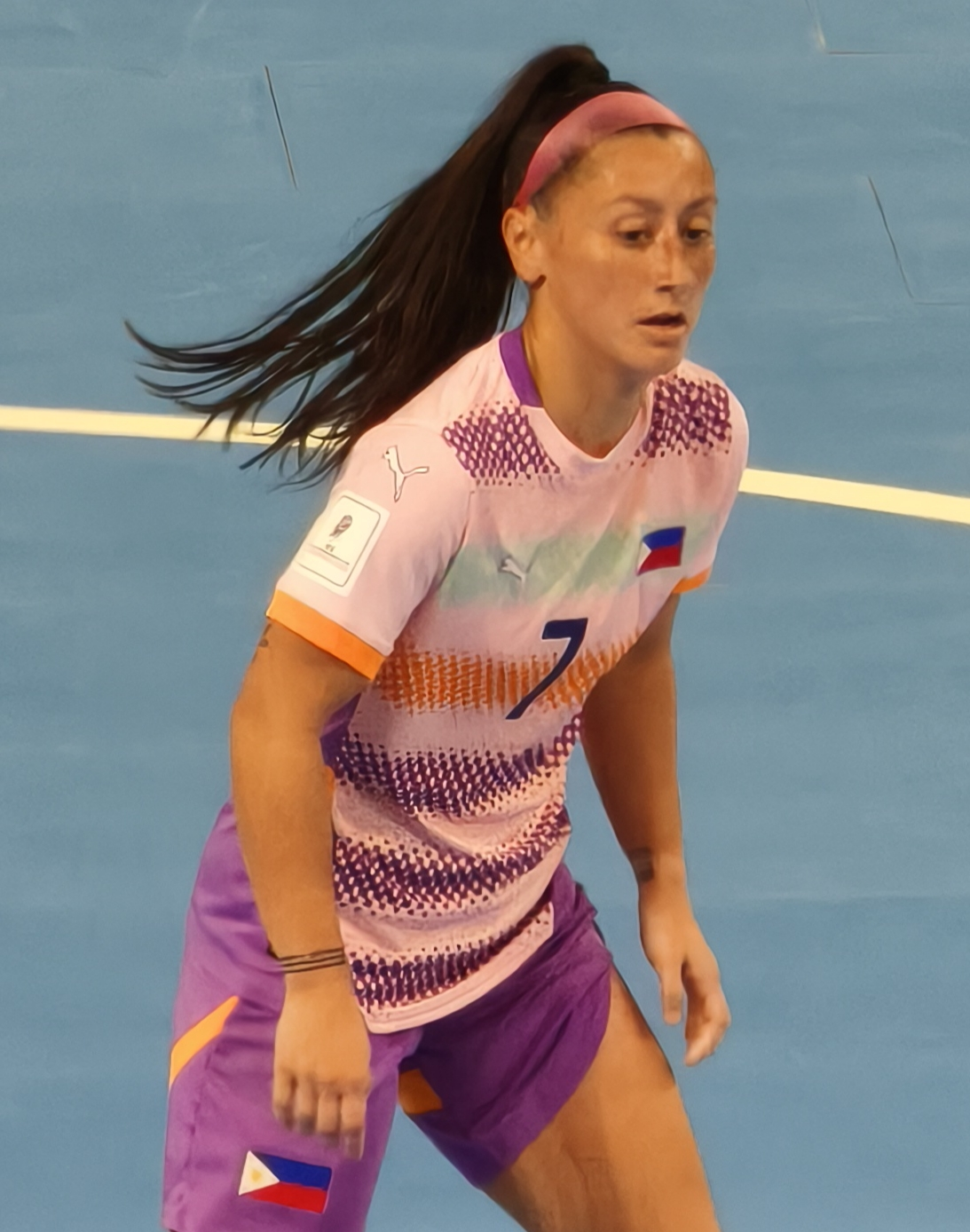
- Guillou at the 2025 FIFA Futsal Women's World Cup

Personal information
- Full name: Katrina Jacqueline Rivera Guillou
- Date of birth: December 19, 1993 (age 32)
- Place of birth: Washington, D.C., U.S.
- Height: 5 ft 2 in (1.57 m)
- Positions: Attacking midfielder; forward

Team information
- Current team: Brisbane Roar
- Number: 21

Youth career
- Bishop Ireton Cardinals

College career
Years	Team	Apps	(Gls)
2012–2015	UNC Wilmington Seahawks	80	(30)

Senior career*
Years	Team	Apps	(Gls)
2016	ONS	8	(2)
2016–2017	Lugano	13	(0)
2018	ONS	15	(6)
2019–2020	Morön	49	(21)
2021–2023	Piteå	61	(12)
2024	Hammarby IF	3	(0)
2024–2026	DC Power FC	30	(0)
2026–	Brisbane Roar	5	(1)

International career^{‡}
2022–	Philippines	50	(13)
2025–	Philippines (futsal)	7	(4)
Medal record
Women's football
Representing the Philippines
AFF Women's Championship
Winner	2022 Philippines	Team
- * Club domestic league appearances and goals as of November 15, 2026 ‡ National team caps and goals as of September 25, 2026

Katrina Jacqueline Rivera Guillou (born December 19, 1993) is a professional women's soccer player who plays as an attacking midfielder or forward for A-League Women club Brisbane Roar. Born in the United States, she plays for the Philippines national football and futsal teams.

== Early life and education ==
Guillou was born to a Filipino mother, Lorna (née Rivera), and a French father, Yves Guillou, in Washington, D.C. A native of Fort Washington, Maryland, she attended the Bishop Ireton High School in Virginia for her secondary studies and later the University of North Carolina Wilmington (UNCW) for her collegiate studies.

== College career ==
From 2012 to 2015, Guillou played for the UNC Wilmington Seahawks women's soccer (football) team which competes in the Colonial Athletic Association Division 1. In her senior year, she helped the Seahawks secure an at-large berth for the NCAA Division I.

== Club career ==
=== Oulu Nice Soccer ===
After graduating from UNCW, Guillou signed up to play for Finnish club Oulu Nice Soccer in 2016. She made 8 appearances and 2 goals for the club in the 2016 Naisten Liiga season.

=== Lugano ===
In August 2016, Guillou left Finland to join Swiss club FF Lugano 1976. She appeared in 13 matches in the regular season and helped Lugano advance to the playoffs where she played five more games and scored one goal in the final round of 2016–17 Nationalliga A. She also featured in two matches in the Swiss Women's Cup, scoring one goal.

=== Return to Oulu Nice Soccer ===
In 2018, Guillou returned to Finland signing with former club Oulu Nice Soccer until the end of 2018 Naisten Liiga season. She scored six goals in 15 league matches. She also played in one match in the Finnish Women's Cup, where she scored a hat-trick on August 4, 2018.

=== Morön BK ===
In December 2018, Guillou joined Swedish Elitettan club Morön BK. During the 2019 season, she scored 8 goals in 23 games.

Guillou remained with Morön BK for the 2020 Elitettan season. She appeared in all 26 games and scored 13 goals. The club finished in third place. During a Swedish Cup match against Piteå IF on October 7, 2020, Guillou scored a hat-trick helping Morön to a 4–3 victory and a berth in the 2020–21 Swedish Cup Group Stage.

=== Piteå IF ===
In December 2020, Damallsvenskan club Piteå IF signed Guillou on a 1+1 year deal. She played 3 seasons for the club scoring 12 goals in 61 matches.

=== Hammarby ===
In April 2024, Guillou signed with Damallsvenskan side Hammarby. She made 3 appearances for the team. Her short-term contract expired in July 2024.

=== DC Power ===
In July 2024, USL Super League club DC Power announced the signing of Guillou. Despite suffering a foot injury during the season, Guillou appeared in 17 matches for DC. She re-signed with the club on July 8, 2025. Following her second season with Power FC, in which she played in 13 games, Guillou departed from DC after the club declined her contract option.

=== Brisbane Roar ===
Ahead of the 2026–27 season, Guillou moved to Australia and signed for A-League Women club Brisbane Roar.

== International career ==
=== Football ===
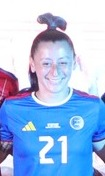
Guillou in 2023.

When she was still a college player, her coach convinced her to join a national team. Two years prior to the Asian Cup, she sent the Philippine Football Federation a highlight reel of her earlier part of her stint in Sweden which led to her securing a Philippine passport in order for her to be able to play for the national team.

Guillou made her first cap for the Philippines in the national team's 1–0 win against Thailand at the 2022 AFC Women's Asian Cup. In that same tournament, she scored her first international goal for the Philippines in their final group match, a 6–0 win against Indonesia. On April 11, 2022, Guillou scored her first international hat-trick in a friendly against Fiji, which the Philippines won 8–0.

Guillou played for the Philippines in the 2023 FIFA Women's World Cup. In their opening match against Switzerland, Guillou scored in the 16th minute but was offsides.

=== Futsal ===
Guillou was called up to become part of the Philippine national futsal team that took part at the 2025 AFC Women's Futsal Asian Cup qualifiers. She scored a brace in her women's futsal debut in the Philippines' 4–1 opener win against Kuwait.

== Career statistics ==
=== Club ===
As of November 15, 2026

Appearances and goals by club, season and competition
Club	Season	League			National Cup (Note: Includes Swiss Women's Cup, Finnish Women's Cup, Svenska cupen)		Other		Total	
Club	Season	Division	Apps	Goals	Apps	Goals	Apps	Goals	Apps	Goals
ONS	2016	Naisten Liiga	8	2	—		—		8	2
FF Lugano 1976	2016–17	Nationalliga A	13	0	2	1	5 (Note: Appearances in Nationalliga A - Final round)	1	20	2
ONS	2018	Naisten Liiga	15	6	1	3	—		16	9
Morön BK	2019	Elitettan	23	8	0	0	—		23	8
Morön BK	2020	Elitettan	26	13	1	3	—		27	16
Morön BK	Total		49	21	1	3	0	0	50	24
Piteå IF	2021	Damallsvenskan	13	1	4	3	—		17	4
Piteå IF	2022	Damallsvenskan	24	7	4	0	—		28	7
Piteå IF	2023	Damallsvenskan	24	4	1	1	—		25	5
Piteå IF	Total		61	12	9	4	0	0	70	16
Hammarby	2024	Damallsvenskan	3	0	0	0	—		3	0
DC Power	2024–25	USL Super League	17	0	—		—		17	0
DC Power	2025–26	USL Super League	13	0	—		—		13	0
DC Power	Total		30	0	0	0	0	0	30	0
Brisbane Roar	2026-27	A-League Women	5	1					5	1
Career total			184	42	13	11	5	1	202	53

=== International goals ===
==== Football ====
No.	Date	Venue	Opponent	Score	Result	Competition
1.	January 27, 2022	Shree Shiv Chhatrapati Sports Complex, Pune	Indonesia	1–0	6–0	2022 AFC Women's Asian Cup
2.	April 11, 2022	Blacktown International Sportspark, Sydney	Fiji	3–0	8–0	Friendly
3.	April 11, 2022	Blacktown International Sportspark, Sydney	Fiji	4–0	8–0	Friendly
4.	April 11, 2022	Blacktown International Sportspark, Sydney	Fiji	6–0	8–0	Friendly
5.	June 26, 2022	Terme Čatež, Brežice	Bosnia and Herzegovina	2–1	2–1	Friendly
6.	July 8, 2022	Rizal Memorial Stadium, Manila	Malaysia	2–0	4–0	2022 AFF Women's Championship
7.	July 17, 2022	Rizal Memorial Stadium, Manila	Thailand	2–0	3–0	2022 AFF Women's Championship
8.	October 7, 2022	Estadio Alejandro Morera Soto, Alajuela	Costa Rica	1–1	1–1	Friendly
9.	December 15, 2022	Wanderers Football Park, Sydney	Papua New Guinea	2–0	9–0	Friendly
10.	December 15, 2022	Wanderers Football Park, Sydney	Papua New Guinea	7–0	9–0	Friendly
11.	September 22, 2023	Wenzhou Sports Center Stadium, Wenzhou	Hong Kong	3–1	3–1	2022 Asian Games
12.	October 26, 2023	Perth Rectangular Stadium, Perth	Chinese Taipei	2–1	4–1	2024 AFC Women's Olympic Qualifying Tournament
13.	October 26, 2024	Emirhan Sport Complex, Antalya	Jordan	3–0	3–0	Pink Ladies Cup

==== Futsal ====
No.	Date	Venue	Opponent	Score	Result	Competition	Ref.
1.	January 11, 2025	Yunusobod Sport Complex, Tashkent	Kuwait	1–0	4–1	2025 AFC Women's Futsal Asian Cup qualification	
2.	January 11, 2025	Yunusobod Sport Complex, Tashkent	Kuwait	4–1	4–1	2025 AFC Women's Futsal Asian Cup qualification	
3.	January 13, 2025	Yunusobod Sport Complex, Tashkent	Uzbekistan	2–1	3–3	2025 AFC Women's Futsal Asian Cup qualification	
4.	January 15, 2025	Yunusobod Sport Complex, Tashkent	Turkmenistan	1–0	2–0	2025 AFC Women's Futsal Asian Cup qualification	

== Honours ==
Philippines

- AFF Women's Championship: 2022
