= Morgan Aquino =

Australian soccer player

Personal information
- Full name: Morgan Elizabeth Aquino
- Date of birth: 4 August 2001 (age 25)
- Place of birth: Perth, Australia
- Height: 1.73 m (5 ft 8 in)
- Position: Goalkeeper

Team information
- Current team: Central Coast Mariners
- Number: 1

Senior career*
Years	Team	Apps	(Gls)
2016–2020	Perth Glory	3	(0)
2020–2021	Brisbane Roar	4	(0)
2021–2024	Perth Glory	38	(0)
2024–2026	DC Power	40	(0)
2026–	Central Coast Mariners	0	(0)

International career^{‡}
2017	Australia U17		
2019	Australia U20		
2024	Australia U23	1	(0)
2024–	Australia	0	(0)
- * Club domestic league appearances and goals as of 1 May 2026 ‡ National team caps and goals as of 17 December 2024

Morgan Elizabeth Aquino (Spanish: [aˈkino]) is an Australian professional soccer player who plays as a goalkeeper for A-League Women club Central Coast Mariners and for the Australia national team. She has previously played for A-League Women clubs Perth Glory FC, where she won an A-League Women Golden Glove award, and Brisbane Roar FC, as well as American USL Super League club DC Power.

== Early life ==
Aquino started playing football alternating between goalkeeper and striker. She was scouted by then Western Australia state coach Elisa D'Ovideo, who selected her for the under-13 state team.

== Club career ==
Aquino started her professional career at her hometown club of Perth Glory, but did not make an appearance until January 2020, coming on as a half time substitute against Western Sydney Wanderers. She made three appearances before signing for Brisbane Roar for the 2020–21 season.

Aquino returned to Perth Glory the following season having made four appearances for the Roar, on a long-term deal. From then on, she started making more regular appearances for the club, sharing goalkeeping duties with her fellow goalkeepers Courtney Newbon and Sarah Langman.

Having established herself as Perth's first choice goalkeeper, Aquino went on to have a breakout season during the 2023–24 campaign. She played in every game and made a record 126 saves with a save percentage of 81.1%, which was the most of any goalkeeper in the league. Her efforts this season earned her a place in both the PFA and A-League Women's teams of the season.

In July 2024, Aquino left Perth Glory to pursue an opportunity in the United States, joining USL Super League club DC Power FC as part of their inaugural playing roster for the 2024–25 season. She soon became the club's first-choice goalkeeper, starting the majority of Power FC's games in its first season of play. The following season, Aquino was named to the USL Super League Team of the Month for February 2026 after starting and playing the entirety of all of DC's matches to that point. After her contract expired at the conclusion of the 2025–26 campaign, Aquino departed from Power FC.

In September 2026, it was announced Aquino returned to Australia, signing with Central Coast Mariners.

== International career ==
Aquino has been called up to the Junior and Young Matildas squads, and featured at the 2019 AFC U-19 Women's Championship. On 15 May 2024, Aquino was called up to the U-23 Matildas squad for the upcoming Four Nations Tournament in Sweden.

In November 2024, Aquino received her first senior call up to the Australian national team.

== Honours ==
=== Club ===
==== Perth Glory ====
- W-League Championship runner-up: 2018–19

=== Individual ===
- PFA A-League Women's Team of the Season: 2023–24
- A-League Women's Goalkeeper of the Year: 2023–24
- Perth Glory A-League Women Members' Player of the Season: 2023–24
- Perth Glory A-League Women Players' Player of the Season: 2023–24
