= Amber DiOrio =

Puerto Rican footballer (born 1999)

Personal information
- Full name: Amber Elena DiOrio
- Date of birth: October 21, 1999 (age 27)
- Height: 5 ft 5 in (1.65 m)
- Position: Defender

Team information
- Current team: Linköping FC
- Number: 24

Youth career
- McLean ECNL

College career
Years	Team	Apps	(Gls)
2018–2022	VCU Rams	73	(1)

Senior career*
Years	Team	Apps	(Gls)
2023–2024	Pumas UNAM	7	(0)
2024–2025	DC Power FC	19	(0)
2026–	Linköping FC	8	(0)

International career^{‡}
2023–	Puerto Rico	8	(0)
- * Club domestic league appearances and goals as of June 13, 2026 ‡ National team caps and goals as of June 13, 2026

Amber Elena DiOrio (born October 21, 1999) is professional footballer who plays as a defender for Swedish Elitettan club Linköping FC. Born in the mainland United States, the plays for the Puerto Rico national team. DiOrio played college soccer for the VCU Rams before joining professional clubs Pumas UNAM in Mexico and DC Power FC of the USL Super League.

== Early life ==
DiOrio grew up in Gainesville, Virginia, in a multicultural family of eight children. Both of her parents were members of the United States military; DiOrio's father was often away from home while completing service for the United States Marine Corps, while DiOrio has since severed ties with her biological mother. DiOrio attended Nokesville-based Patriot High School, where she was a four-year starter at center back for the school's soccer team. In her senior year in 2018, she led Patriot High to an undefeated regular season and district tournament title. She was also a three-year team captain, first-team all-region, and first-team all-conference honoree. DiOrio played soccer outside of school for McLean ECNL.

== College career ==
In her first two seasons playing college soccer for the VCU Rams, DiOrio was largely a bench player, starting in only 4 of her 27 appearances. She bagged a spot on the Rams' first-choice lineup in her junior year, starting all 13 of VCU's matches and helping the team post five shutouts. She scored her lone collegiate goal on March 6, 2021, in a 2–1 victory over Richmond.

As a senior in the 2021 fall season, DiOrio led the Rams to an Atlantic 10 Conference regular season championship. She had the highest amount of minutes played on the team and also helped VCU post the best goals against average in the conference. She was recognized on the All-Atlantic 10 second team at the end of the season. DiOrio then participated in one final campaign with the Rams, taking advantage of the extra year of NCAA eligibility afforded to athletes due to the COVID-19 pandemic. She rounded out her collegiate career with a season that earned her second-team all-conference and all-state honors.

== Club career ==
=== Pumas UNAM ===
DiOrio signed her first professional contract with Liga MX Femenil club Pumas UNAM, joining the team ahead of the 2023 Apertura (fall portion). She made her pro debut on August 21, 2023, participating in a 4–1 victory over Mazatlán. She made 7 appearances for Pumas before departing from the club following the 2024 Clausura.

=== DC Power FC ===
On July 11, 2024, DC Power FC announced that they had signed DiOrio ahead of the inaugural USL Super League season. DiOrio made her Super League debut in DC's second game of the season, coming on as a substitute in a draw with the Tampa Bay Sun on August 8, 2024. On March 9, 2025, DiOrio thought she had scored her first professional goal, a header against Lexington SC in Power FC's spring home opener, but it was later ruled as offside. She appeared in a total of 19 games as the club failed to qualify for the inaugural USL Super League playoffs. In June 2025, Power FC announced that they had declined DiOrio's contract option, releasing her from the club after one season.

=== Linköping FC ===
Following her experience in the USL, DiOrio considered ending her playing career. However, after discussions with the Puerto Rico national team and learning of interest from Swedish team Linköping FC, she decided otherwise. On February 16, 2026, she was announced at Linköping FC in the lead-up to the club's first season since getting relegated to the Elitettan. She soon formed a consistent partnership in central defense with Emma Aldén, filling the absence of recently-departed Noor Eckhoff.

== International career ==
DiOrio is half-Puerto Rican through her father. After discovering her heritage while in college, she reached out to the Puerto Rico national team and joined the team in January 2023. In February 2024, DiOrio was named to Puerto Rico's squad for the 2024 CONCACAF W Gold Cup. She had previously earned the start against Haiti in Puerto Rico's Gold Cup qualification match.

In April 2026, DiOrio was sent off in a defeat to Mexico after committing two bookable offenses.

== Honors and awards ==
VCU Rams

- Atlantic 10 Conference: 2021

Individual

- Second-team All-Atlantic 10: 2021, 2022
