= Paige Almendariz =

American soccer player (born 1997)

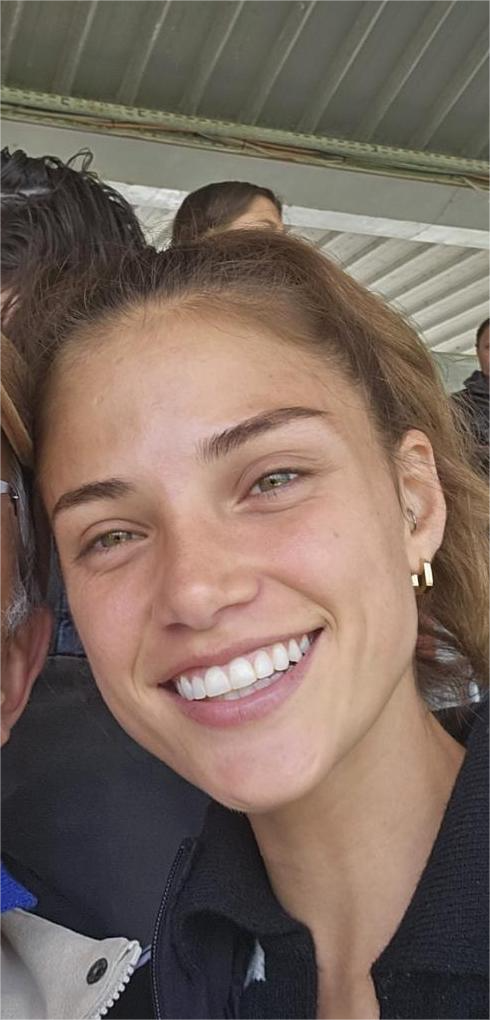
- Paige Almendariz (2024, Benfica Campus)

Personal information
- Full name: Paige Noel Almendariz
- Date of birth: October 19, 1997 (age 29)
- Place of birth: Sacramento, California, United States
- Height: 1.73 m (5 ft 8 in)
- Position: Defender

Team information
- Current team: DC Power FC
- Number: 22

College career
| Years | Team | Apps | (Gls) |
| 2016–2019 | UNLV Rebels | 83 | (1) |

Senior career*
| Years | Team | Apps | (Gls) |
| 2019 | California Storm | 0 | (0) |
| 2020–2021 | Länk Vilaverdense | 7 | (1) |
| 2021–2023 | Braga | 22 | (4) |
| 2023–2024 | Benfica | 8 | (1) |
| 2024–2025 | Tampa Bay Sun | 26 | (0) |
| 2025– | DC Power FC | 26 | (0) |
- * Club domestic league appearances and goals as of 01:39, May 18, 2026 (UTC)

Paige Noel Almendariz (born October 19, 1997) is an American professional soccer player who plays as a defender for USL Super League club DC Power.

== Club career ==
In the summer of 2023, Almendariz signed with Benfica. She was part of Benfica's historic season, where the club won all four domestic competitions. the Campeonato Nacional (Portuguese League, fourth in the club's history), the Taça de Portugal (Portuguese Cup, second in the club's history), the Taça da Liga (Portuguese League Cup, fourth in the club's history), and the Supertaça de Portugal (Portuguese Supercup, third in the club's history). She also help the club reach the quarter-finals of the UEFA Women's Champions League for the first time in the club's history. Almendariz played 18 games and scored 2 goals in all competitions.

Almendariz joined Tampa Bay Sun on August 23, 2024. She helped the club win the inaugural USL Super League. Her jersey just has her first name on the back instead of her surname.

Almendariz joined DC Power on July 11, 2025.

== Personal life ==
She previously dated former Arsenal defender, Rob Holding.

As of 2025 and 2026, Almendariz is in a relationship with professional baseball star Christian Yelich of the Milwaukee Brewers.

== Honors ==
Benfica

- Campeonato Nacional Feminino: 2023–24
- Taça de Portugal: 2023–24
- Taça da Liga: 2023–24
- Supertaça de Portugal: 2023

Tampa Bay Sun

- USL Super League: 2024–25
