= Jeannette Yango =

Cameroonian footballer

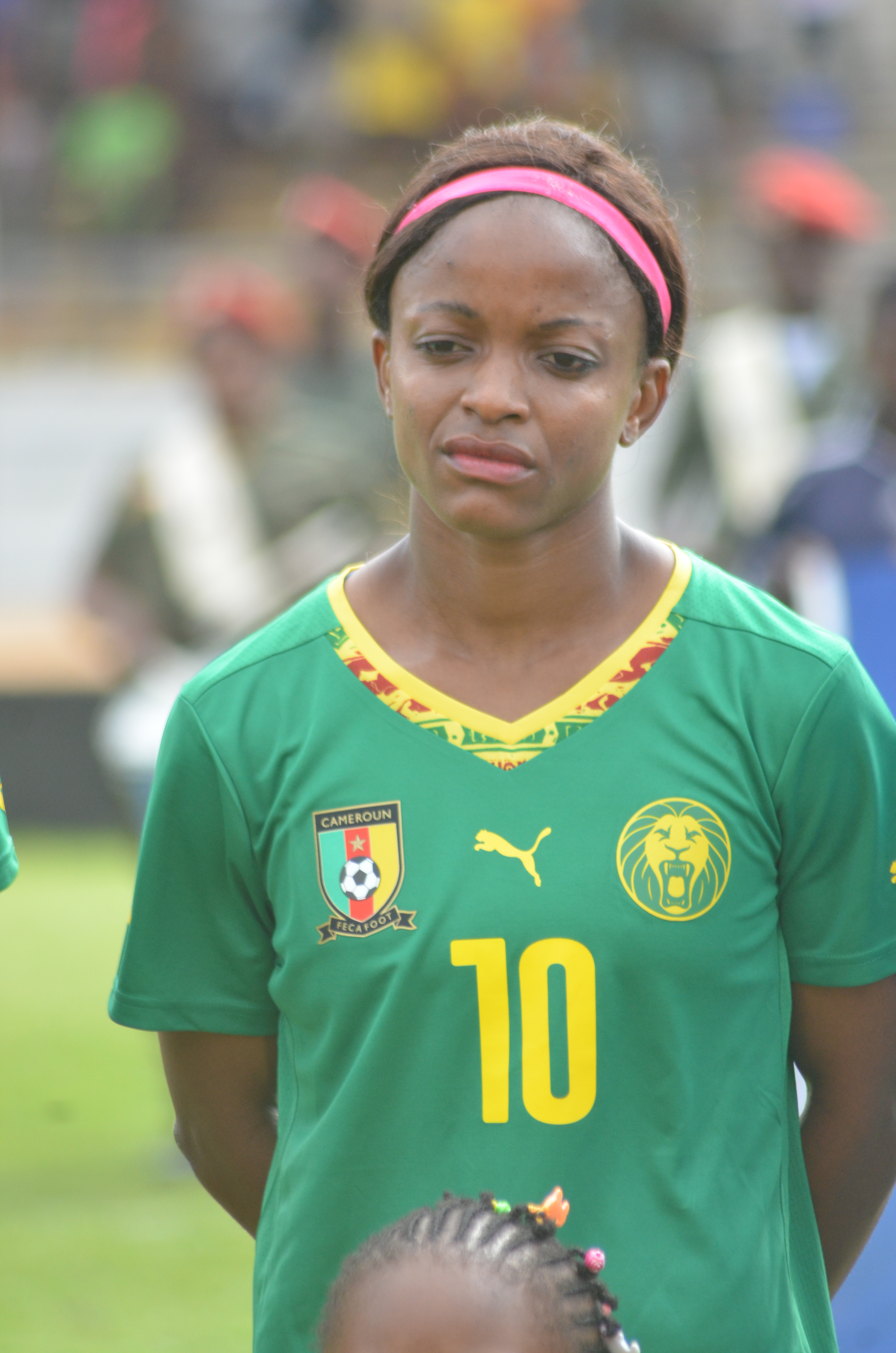

Personal information
- Full name: Jeannette Grace Ngock Yango
- Date of birth: 12 June 1993 (age 33)
- Place of birth: Douala, Cameroon
- Height: 1.59 m (5 ft 3 in)
- Position: Midfielder

Senior career*
Years	Team	Apps	(Gls)
2011	ŽFK Spartak Subotica		
2012	1. FC Katowice		
2012–2013	1. FFC Turbine Potsdam II	6	(0)
2012–2013	1. FFC Turbine Potsdam	3	(0)
2013–2015	Yzeure	33	(0)
2019–2021	Guingamp	33	(0)
2021–2022	Fleury	28	(1)
2023	Marseille	8	(0)
2023–2024	Guingamp	14	(0)
2024–2026	DC Power FC	19	(0)

International career^{‡}
2010–	Cameroon	35	(1)
- * Club domestic league appearances and goals as of 18 June 2025 ‡ National team caps and goals as of 16:46, 23 June 2015 (UTC)

Jeannette Grace Ngock Yango (born 12 June 1993) is a Cameroonian footballer who plays as a midfielder for the Cameroon national team.

== Club career ==
In July 2024, Ngock was announced as a member of the inaugural roster for DC Power of the USL Super League. She spent two seasons with Power FC before the club declined her contract option in 2026, releasing her. She had made 19 appearances for DC.

== International career ==
Ngock was called up to the Cameroon squad for the 2010 African Women's Championship.

Ngock was called up to the Cameroon squad for the 2012 Summer Olympics.

Ngock was called up to the Cameroon squad for the 2014 African Women's Championship.

On 17 April 2015, Ngock was called up to the Cameroon squad for the 2015 FIFA Women's World Cup.

Ngock was called up to the Cameroon squad for the 2016 Women's Africa Cup of Nations.

On 9 November 2018, Ngock was called up to the Cameroon squad for the 2018 Women's Africa Cup of Nations.

On 24 May 2019, Ngock was called up to the Cameroon squad for the 2019 FIFA Women's World Cup.

On 20 June 2022, Ngock was called up to the Cameroon squad for the 2022 Women's Africa Cup of Nations.

== Honours ==
1. FFC Turbine Potsdam

- Bundesliga runner-up: 2012–13
- DFB-Pokal runner-up: 2012–13
