= Adelaide Gay =

American soccer goalkeeper

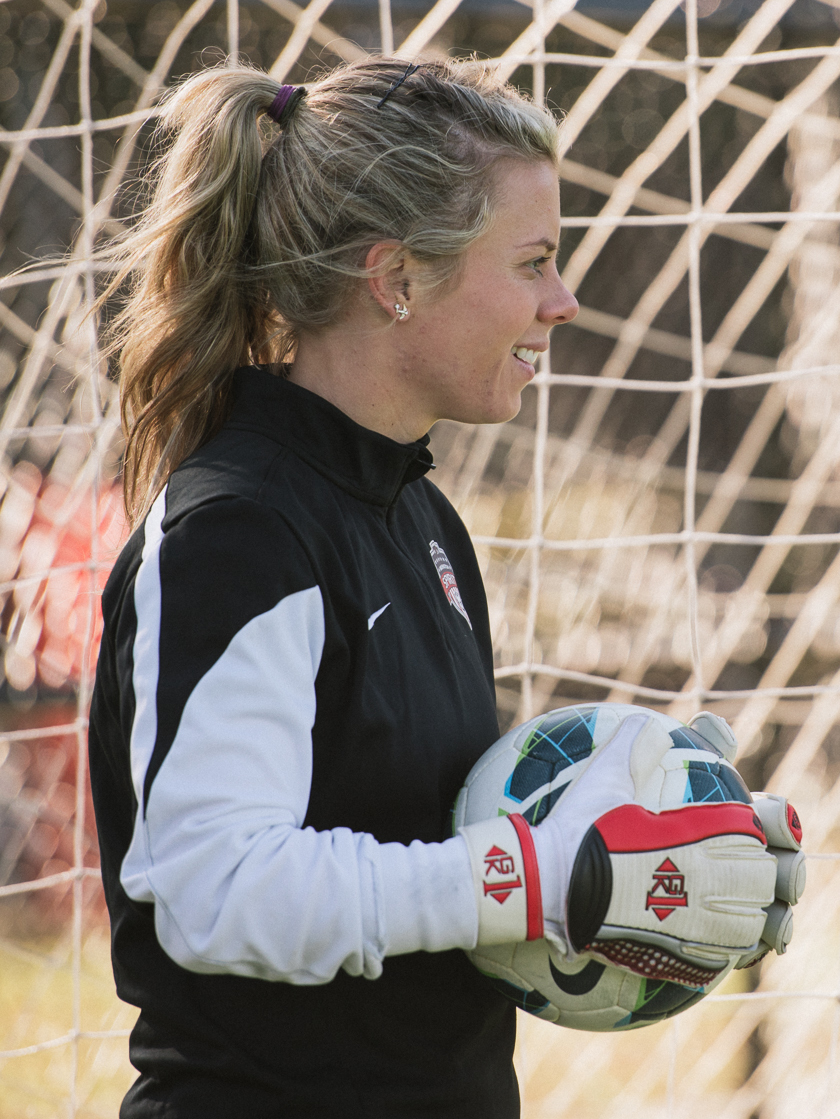
- Gay with the Washington Spirit in 2014

Personal information
- Full name: Adelaide Anne Gay
- Date of birth: November 3, 1989 (age 37)
- Place of birth: Princeton, New Jersey
- Height: 5 ft 6 in (1.68 m)
- Position: Goalkeeper

Team information
- Current team: Celtic
- Number: 33

College career
Years	Team	Apps	(Gls)
2008	Yale Bulldogs	5	(0)
2010–2012	North Carolina Tar Heels	46	(0)

Senior career*
Years	Team	Apps	(Gls)
2009–2011	Pali Blues		(0)
2013	Portland Thorns	0	(0)
2014	Washington Spirit	0	(0)
2015–2016	Kvarnsveden	43	(0)
2017	ÍBV	18	(0)
2018	Seattle Reign	0	(0)
2018	Portland Thorns	0	(0)
2018	Kvarnsveden	13	(0)
2020	Klepp	18	(0)
2021	Nordsjælland	11	(0)
2021–2023	Fortuna Hjørring	35	(0)
2024	Asheville City	6	(0)
2024–2025	DC Power FC	7	(0)
2025–	Celtic	8	(0)
- * Club domestic league appearances and goals as of August 16, 2025

Adelaide Anne Gay (born November 3, 1989) is an American professional soccer player who plays as a goalkeeper for Scottish Women's Premier League club Celtic.

== Early life ==
Born in Princeton, New Jersey to Lori and John Gay, Adelaide attended and played for the Lawrenceville School in Lawrenceville, New Jersey. Gay was goalkeeper on the varsity soccer team and was captain of the team as a senior in 2007. She helped lead her team to three Prep A finals—in 2004, 2006 and 2007—was named first-team All-MAPLS her sophomore through senior years, was a NJISAA Prep A first-team choice those same three years, and was The Trentonian prep A player of the year selection in 2007. Gay also excelled academically. She graduated with a 4.0 GPA, member of Cum Laude Society, and was a National Merit Scholar. Gay also competed in indoor track running the 200 and 800 meters and throwing shot put.

Gay also played for the PDA Power club team which won State Cup championships four times as well as the 2005 regional title. The club team was a national finalist in 2005. Gay was captain of the team that won the Region 1 Premier League championship in 2004 & 2006 and was a finalist in 2005 and 2007. She was also chosen as a member of the Region 1 Olympic Development Program (ODP) Team.

== College career ==
Gay attended Yale University in 2009. The following year, she transferred to the University of North Carolina where she stayed for the remainder of her collegiate career and majored in Business Administration.

During her sophomore year in 2010, Gay played in six games and logged a 0.94 goals against average (GAA). Her junior year, Gay played 900 minutes, alternating halves with Anna Sieloff in goal. She allowed only four goals and led the Atlantic Coast Conference (ACC) in goals against average at 0.40. Gay recorded a save percentage of .852 with 23 saves on the season, including a career high of four against Texas A&M. She was named a first-team Capital One Academic All-America by College Sports Information Directors of America and earned Academic All-District honors. She was an All-ACC Academic Team selection and was nominated for the 2012 ACC Academic Honor Roll.

Gay finished with a goalkeeper record of 7–0–0 sharing shutouts with Anna Sieloff against University of North Carolina at Greensboro, Florida State, Clemson, Duke, Wake Forest, Boston College and Baylor. She recorded a scoreless streak of over 450 minutes starting in September through November. During her senior year with the Tar Heels, Gay helped the team win their 21st NCAA championship title.

== Club career ==
In 2009, Gay played for the Pali Blues in the W-League and helped the team win the 2009 W-League Championship.

In 2013, the Portland Thorns FC signed Gay as a discovery player headed into the inaugural season of the National Women's Soccer League (NWSL). When Portland signed Amber Brooks on January 2, 2014, they waived Gay ahead of the 2014 season. She signed with the Washington Spirit in April of the same year.

In 2015, Gay signed with Kvarnsvedens IK in the Swedish Elitettan. Gay played every minute of the team's 26 league games and recorded 16 clean sheets helping the team win the league title and promotion to the top-division Damallsvenskan. Gay re-signed for the 2016 season with Kvarnsveden in the Damallsvenskan.

Gay signed with Icelandic club Íþróttabandalag Vestmannaeyja (IBV) for the 2017 season and helped the team win the 2017 Icelandic Women's Cup in September.

In March 2018, Gay signed with Seattle Reign FC in the NWSL as a national team replacement player. In April 2018, Gay signed with the Portland Thorns again as a national team replacement player.

After being released from Portland, Gay got a call from Sweden and in July again signed with Kvarnsvedens IK now back in the Swedish Elitettan for the second half of the season.

On June 28, 2024, Gay was announced as the first goalkeeper signed by DC Power ahead of the inaugural USL Super League season.

In August 2025, Gay signed a one-year contract with Scottish Women's Premier League club Celtic; The move reconnected her with head coach Elena Sadiku, who had been part of the Fortuna Hjørring coaching staff during Gay's spell at Hjørring. On 26 June 2026 Celtic announced that Gay would extend her contract until the summer of 2027.

== Honors ==
Portland Thorns FC

- NWSL Championship: 2013

Celtic FC

- Scottish Cup: 2026
