= Yuuka Kurosaki =

Japanese soccer player

Personal information
- Date of birth: June 12, 1997 (age 29)
- Place of birth: Fukuoka, Japan
- Height: 5 ft 3 in (1.60 m)
- Position: Midfielder

Team information
- Current team: Glasgow City FC
- Number: 28

College career
| Years | Team | Apps | (Gls) |
| 2017–2018 | Kentucky Wildcats | 24 | (6) |
| 2019–2020 | Oklahoma Sooners | 26 | (4) |

Senior career*
| Years | Team | Apps | (Gls) |
| 2021 | FC Wacker Innsbruck | | |
| 2021–2022 | Arna-Bjørnar | 20 | (2) |
| 2023 | KuPS | 11 | (3) |
| 2024 | Racing Louisville | 0 | (0) |
| 2024–2025 | DC Power FC | 23 | (1) |
| 2026 | Bodø/Glimt | 7 | (1) |
| 2026– | Glasgow City FC | 0 | (0) |
- * Club domestic league appearances and goals as of September 9, 2026

Yuuka Kurosaki (born June 12, 1997) is a Japanese soccer player who plays as a midfielder for Glasgow City FC. She previously played for KuPS in Finland's Kansallinen Liga and Arna-Bjørnar in the Norwegian Toppserien.

== College career ==
Kurosaki matriculated to the University of Kentucky in 2015 after starring for Fujieda Junshin High School in Japan, where she won the national high school championship as a senior. In her first season with the Kentucky Wildcats in 2017, Kurosaki had two goals and one assist in 13 appearances. She led the team with four goals in 2018, making 11 appearances.

After the 2018 season, Kurosaki transferred to the University of Oklahoma, where she played in 26 games between 2019 and the COVID-19-shortened 2020 season. She scored four goals and totaled four assists with Oklahoma Sooners women's soccer team, playing the 2019 season under Matt Potter.

== Professional career ==
After college in February 2021, Kurosaki signed with Wacker Innsbruck in the Austrian ÖFB Frauen Bundesliga. She scored four goals in eight appearances for the club before moving to Arna-Bjørnar in Norway in September 2021, becoming the first Japanese player to sign for the club. In 20 appearances over a season and a half, Kurosaki scored two goals. She signed with KuPS in 2023, helping the Finnish club win the Kansallinen Liiga and the Finnish Women's Cup.

Kurosaki signed a two-year contract with a mutual option for the 2026 season with Racing Louisville in January 2024.

On August 15, 2024, DC Power FC acquired Kurosaki for an undisclosed fee.
