= Zaneta Wyne =

American soccer player (born 1990)

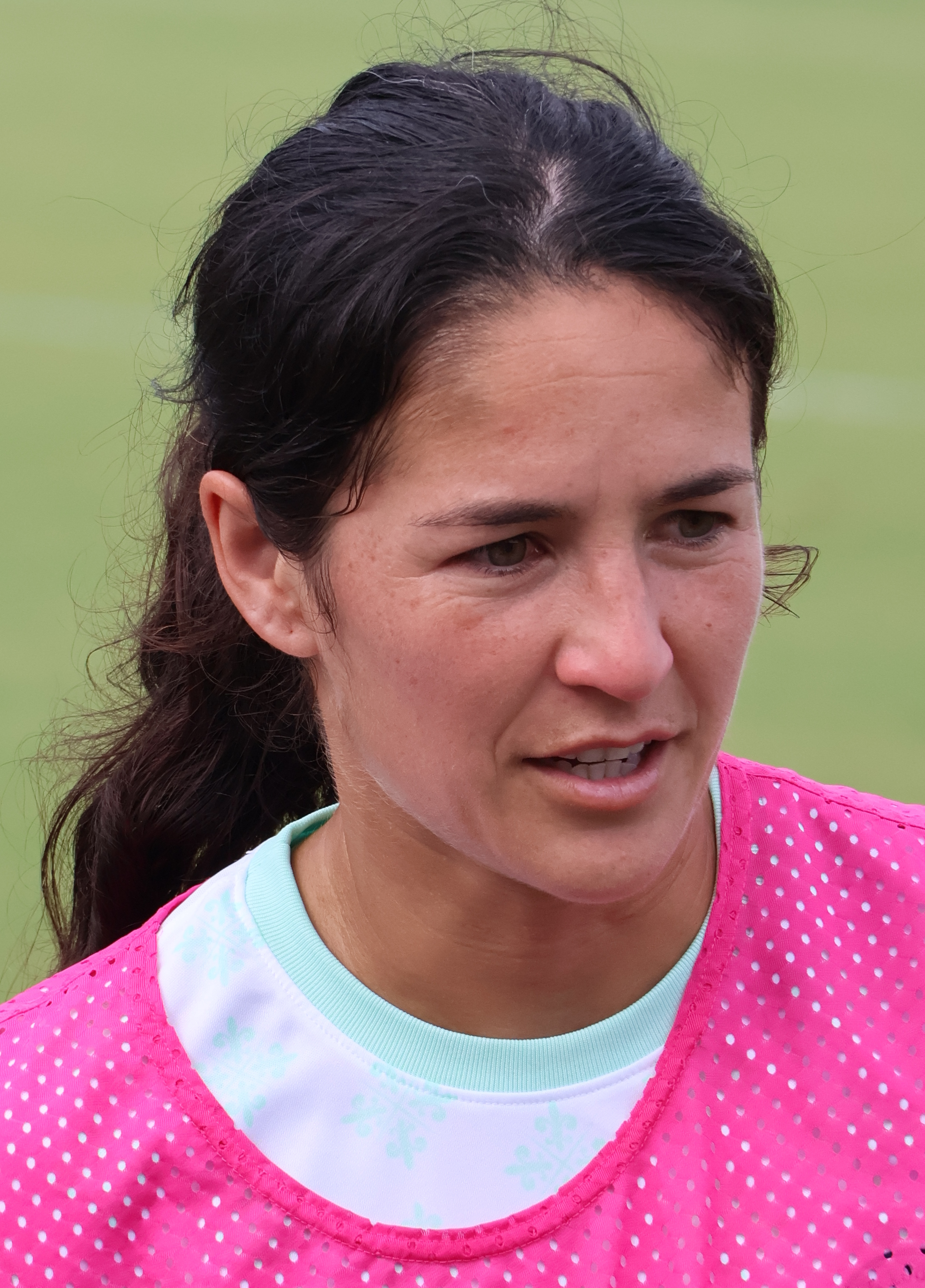
- Wyne with Racing Louisville FC in 2023

Personal information
- Full name: Zaneta Josseline Wyne
- Date of birth: August 3, 1990 (age 36)
- Place of birth: Newport Beach, California, United States
- Height: 1.68 m (5 ft 6 in)
- Position: Midfielder

College career
| Years | Team | Apps | (Gls) |
| 2008–2011 | New Mexico Lobos | | |

Senior career*
| Years | Team | Apps | (Gls) |
- San Diego WFC SeaLions
| 2013 | GBK Kokkola | | |
| 2014 | Víkingur Ólafsvík | 16 | (3) |
| 2015–2016 | Apollon | | |
| 2016 | Þór/KA | 9 | (1) |
| 2016 | Atlanta Silverbacks | | |
| 2017 | Þór/KA | 15 | (0) |
| 2017–2018 | Sunderland | 5 | (0) |
| 2018–2019 | Klepp IL | 32 | (5) |
| 2020–2021 | Glasgow City | | |
| 2021–2022 | West Ham United | 18 | (1) |
| 2022–2023 | Racing Louisville FC | 9 | (0) |
| 2023–2024 | Al Qadsiah | 8 | |

Managerial career
- 2023: Al Qadsiah (assistant)
- 2024–: DC Power (assistant)
- * Club domestic league appearances and goals as of July 27, 2022

Zaneta Josseline Wyne (born August 3, 1990) is an American former professional soccer player who is currently an assistant coach for USL Super League club DC Power FC.

== Early life and education ==
Wyne attended Aliso Niguel High School in Orange County, California where she played for the girls varsity team. She graduated from the University of New Mexico, and played for San Diego WFC SeaLions in the Women's Premier Soccer League (WPSL).

== Club career ==
=== GBK Kokkola ===
Wyne played for Finnish club GBK Kokkola in 2013 followed by Iceland's Víkingur Ólafsvík in 2014. In 2015, she moved to Cyprus' Apollon Ladies F.C. where they qualified for the UEFA Women's Champions League, which Wyne participated in. In 2016, Wyne returned to Iceland to play for Þór/KA after a suggestion from former Apollon player Cecilia Santiago as they felt she was a like-for-like replacement for fellow American Heid Ragne who had to return to the United States. In 2016, she temporarily returned to the United States to play for Atlanta Silverbacks in the WPSL.

=== Sunderland ===
In 2017, Wyne moved to England to play for FA WSL 1 side Sunderland on the transfer deadline day before Þór/KA's final two league fixtures. Þór/KA agreed to release Wyne to Sunderland early as they did not want to stop Wyne taking advantage of the opportunity to play for Sunderland Ladies.

=== Klepp IL ===
Wyne signed with Norwegian side Klepp IL for the 2018 season. She scored her first goal for the club during the team's 1–1 draw against Vålerenga on September 9. During a 5–3 win against IK Grand Bodø, she scored two goals in the 28th and 59th minutes. Klepp IL finished in second place during the 2018 Toppserien with a 15–4–3 record. Zyne's two goals tied for fifth highest on the squad.

=== Glasgow City ===
In July 2020, Wyne signed for Scottish side Glasgow City.

=== West Ham United ===
In June 2021, Wyne signed with FA Women's Super League side West Ham United. She rejoined manager Olli Harder whom she had previously played under at Klepp IL.

=== Racing Louisville ===
Wyne signed with NWSL club Racing Louisville in late June 2022 as a national team replacement player. By the end of July, Racing had signed her to a permanent contract through the end of the 2023 NWSL season.

=== Al Qadsiah ===
In October 2023, Wyne joined Saudi club Al Qadsiah as a player-coach. Wyne led the team in both goals and assists.

== Coaching career ==
On July 8, 2024, Wyne was announced as the first assistant coach brought in to Frédéric Brillant's coaching staff for DC Power FC in the USL Super League. Wyne had previously spent time as a player-coach for Al Qadsiah in the Saudi Women's Premier League.

== Personal life ==
Wyne holds both American and French citizenship.

== Honors ==
Apollon Limassol

- Cypriot First Division winner: 2015-16
- Cypriot Women's Cup winner: 2016
