= Claire Constant =

Haitian footballer (born 1999)

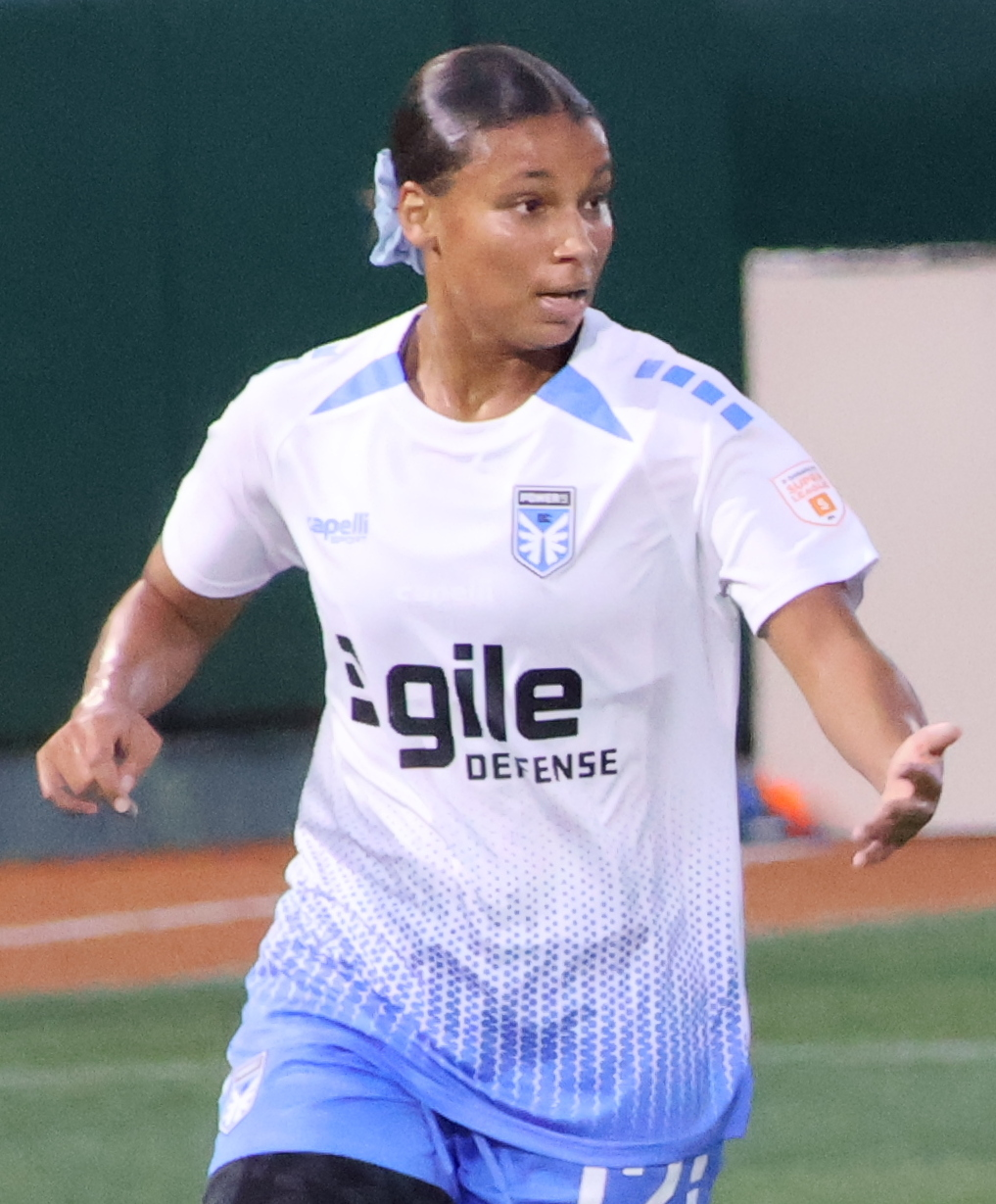
- Constant with DC Power FC in 2026

Personal information
- Full name: Claire Anna Constant
- Date of birth: 13 October 1999 (age 27)
- Place of birth: Alexandria, Virginia, U.S.
- Height: 1.70 m (5 ft 7 in)
- Positions: Defender; midfielder

Team information
- Current team: DC Power FC
- Number: 12

College career
Years	Team	Apps	(Gls)
2018–2022	Virginia Cavaliers	102	(8)

Senior career*
Years	Team	Apps	(Gls)
2023–2024	Torreense	7	(0)
2024–	DC Power FC	39	(1)

International career^{‡}
2022–	Haiti	11	(1)
- * Club domestic league appearances and goals as of 17 May 2026 ‡ National team caps and goals as of 10 July 2024

Claire Anna Constant (born 13 October 1999) is a professional footballer who plays as a defender for USL Super League club DC Power FC. Born in the United States, she plays for the Haiti national team. She played college soccer for the Virginia Cavaliers. She began her professional career with Portuguese club Torreense.

== Early life ==
Claire Constant was born on 13 October 1999 in Alexandria, Virginia, United States. She is the eldest of two daughters of Haitian father Reverend Joseph Constant and an American mother. She helped with her father's non-profit organisation, the Haiti Micah Project, which provides aid to underprivileged children in Haiti. Constant attended T.C. Williams High School, where she a part of the soccer team that won the school's first ever district title. In 2017, she was named the Gatorade Virginia Girls Soccer Player of the Year.

After high school, she majored in American Studies at the University of Virginia while also playing college soccer for the university's team, the Virginia Cavaliers, making her debut in 2018. During her college career, she made 102 appearances and scored 8 goals, before leaving the team in 2022. Constant was also the recipient of the 2022–2023 Jacqueline O'Reilly Endowed Athletics Scholarship.

== Club career ==
In February 2023, Constant signed for the Portuguese side Torreense. However, she tore her ACL in May while playing for the club, resulting in her needing to have a year off to recover.

In July 2024, Constant was announced as a member of the inaugural roster for DC Power of the USL Super League, bringing her within thirty minutes of her childhood home. She was named the club's first-ever captain and starred in 19 matches as DC Power finished second-to-last in the league standings. At the end of the season, the club exercised Constant's contract option. On 14 February 2026, Constant scored her first professional goal, the equalizer in a 1–1 draw with Tampa Bay Sun FC.

== International career ==
Constant was selected to United States women's national youth team training several times. However, she elected to pursue playing internationally for Haiti, after she was contacted by a Haitian football federation official via Facebook and Instagram asking her to play for the team, despite not yet possessing Haitian dual citizenship. Constant later recalled difficulty with the language barrier with the team, as the coaching staff and the team mainly spoke French and Creole, neither of which Constant was fluent. She made her official Haitian debut in summer 2022.

Constant was nicknamed "Cyborg" by her Haiti women's national football team teammates. As she helped Haiti qualify for the 2023 FIFA Women's World Cup, the first time they qualified for the World Cup, she was regarded as a fan favorite due to her performances as a defender.
