= Katie Duong =

American soccer player (born 2001)

Personal information
- Full name: Katelyn Duong
- Date of birth: March 27, 2001 (age 25)
- Place of birth: Portland, Oregon
- Position: Midfielder

Team information
- Current team: Breiðablik
- Number: 8

College career
Years	Team	Apps	(Gls)
2019–2020	Minnesota Golden Gophers	28	(1)
2021–2023	Stanford Cardinal	38	(2)

Senior career*
Years	Team	Apps	(Gls)
2024	Minnesota Aurora	12	(9)
2024–2025	DC Power FC	36	(1)
2026–	Breiðablik	0	(0)

International career
2019–2020	United States U20	9	(1)
- * Club domestic league appearances and goals as of 02:53, January 18, 2026 (UTC)

Katelyn Duong (born March 27, 2001) is an American professional soccer player who plays as a midfielder for Besta deild kvenna club Breiðablik. She played college soccer for the Minnesota Golden Gophers and the Stanford Cardinal and was drafted by the Portland Thorns in the fourth round of the 2024 NWSL Draft. She has played for the United States under-20 team.

== Early life ==
Duong was born in Portland, Oregon, to a Vietnamese father named Hieu Duong and an American mother named Kari. She has a younger sister named Emily.

She played high school soccer at Jesuit High school and graduated in 2019. She led Jesuit to state titles in 2015 and 2018, and was named to the All-American team as well as the Oregon Sports Award Prep Soccer Player of the Year award in 2018. In high school, she also played club soccer for Crossfire Premier, leading the club to the Elite Clubs National League (ECNL) finals in 2018 and the U.S. Soccer Development Academy (DA) semifinals in 2018.

== College career ==
Duong played at the University of Minnesota for her freshman year in 2019. She skipped the 2020 season due to the COVID-19 pandemic and played at Stanford University from her junior year to her 5th year, for the 2021–2023 seasons.

In her freshman season, Duong played in all 16 season games. She led the team with 38 total shots and 15 shots on goal, and finished third on the team with three points. With the U20 national team, she competed in the 2019 Nike International Friendlies and the 2020 U20 CONCACAF Champion.

In her junior season at Stanford in 2021, she played in 18 matches and started in 4. She scored one goal and four assists, for a total of six points. In her senior year in 2022, she appeared in 11 matches and scored one goal and one assist. She was on the Pac-12 Fall Academic Honor Roll, and Stanford won the Pac-12 Championships that year. In her fifth year, she appeared in nine matches while scoring two assists. She was on Pac-12 Fall Academic Honor Roll, and was drafted in the NWSL draft after.

== Club career ==
Duong was selected by the Portland Thorns in the 4th round as the 53rd overall pick in the 2024 NWSL Draft. She was a practice player for the Thorns prior to being picked, during her final season with Stanford.

She started playing for Minnesota Aurora FC of the USL W League in June 2024.

Duong joined DC Power FC in the summer of 2024 and played in the inaugural USL Super League match on August 17, 2024. She made 36 appearances for the club before departing from DC Power on a mutual contract termination in January 2026.

In January 2026, Duong signed with Icelandic champions Breiðablik.

== International career ==
She was part of the United States national team U13 and U14 training camps, but didn't play in any official games. A few years later, she competed for the United States U20 team in a match against the Honduras in the 2020 CONCACAF Women's U-20 Championship, scoring one goal and three assists.

== Personal life ==
Duong has been coaching soccer since 8th grade, and have worked with students during her time in Minnesota as well as in her hometown of Portland. She has a degree in biomechanical engineering from Stanford University.

== Honors and awards ==
Stanford Cardinal

- Pac-12 Conference: 2022

Breiðablik

- Icelandic Women's Football League Cup: 2026

Individual

- Second-team All-Big Ten: 2020
- Big Ten all-freshmen team: 2019
