= Susanna Fitch =

American soccer player (born 1998)

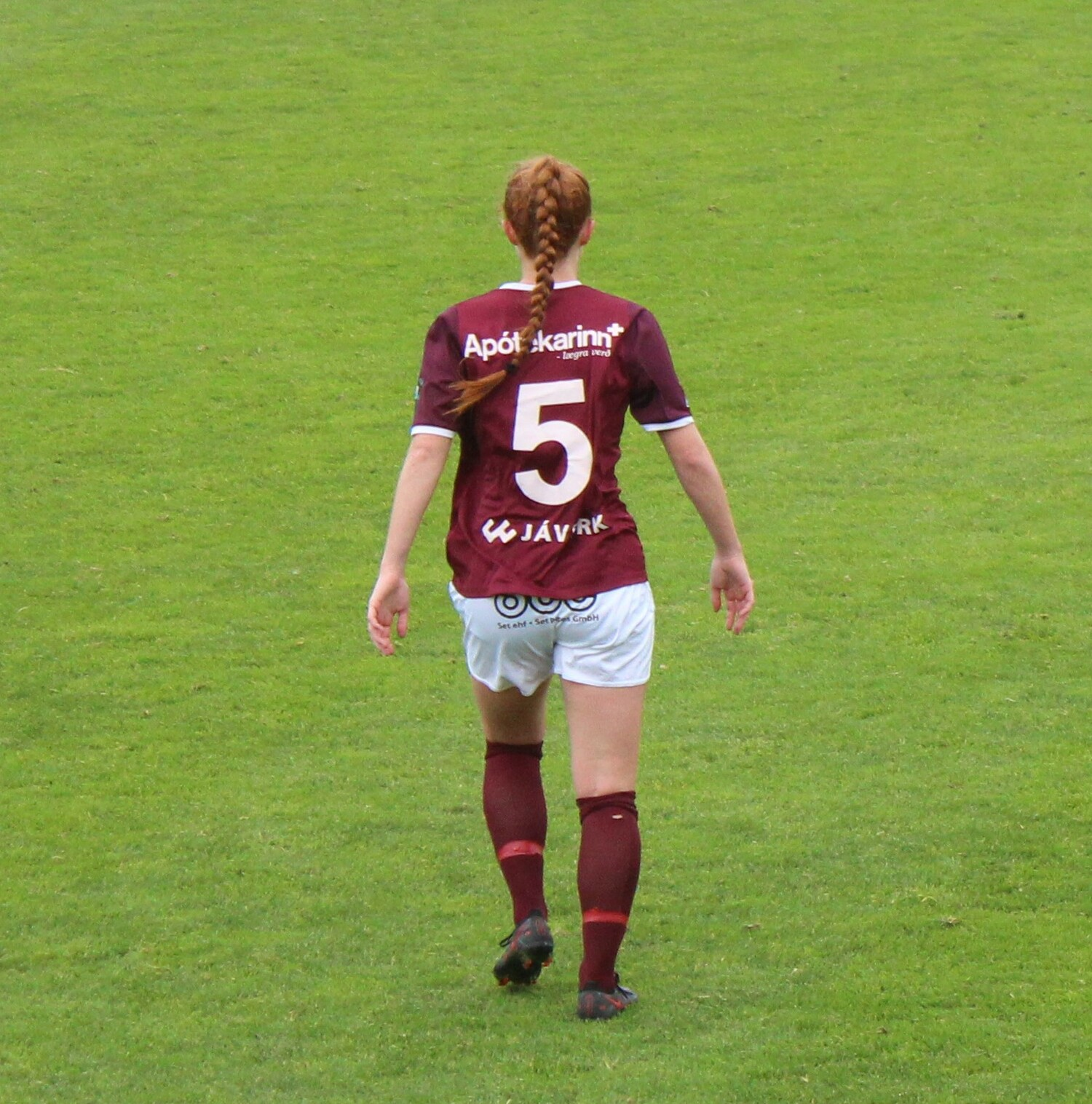
- Fitch with Selfoss in 2021

Personal information
- Birth name: Susanna Joy Friedrichs
- Date of birth: October 29, 1998 (age 27)
- Place of birth: Henrico County, Virginia, United States
- Position: Defender

Team information
- Current team: DC Power FC
- Number: 3

College career
Years	Team	Apps	(Gls)
2016–2019	VCU Rams	76	(9)

Senior career*
Years	Team	Apps	(Gls)
2020–2021	Slovácko		
2021–2022	Selfoss	20	(1)
2023	Houston Dash	0	(0)
2023	Napoli	9	(0)
2024–	DC Power FC	45	(2)
- * Club domestic league appearances and goals as of 01:41, May 18, 2026 (UTC)

Susanna Joy Fitch (née Friedrichs; born October 29, 1998) is an American women's soccer player who plays as a defender for DC Power in the USL Super League.

== Club career ==
Fitch played for VCU Rams from 2016 to 2019. After playing in a Czech league with Slovácko, she moved to Iceland at Selfoss. In July 2023, she joined Houston Dash, but left after two months, when she signed a contract with Serie A side Napoli Femminile. Fitch's experience at Napoli lasted a few months before her contract was terminated at the beginning of 2024.

In July 2024, Fitch was announced as a member of the inaugural roster for USL Super League club DC Power. In June 2025, Fitch was named to the first-ever All-League First Team.

== Personal life ==
She married professional soccer player Simon Fitch on December 21, 2024.
