= DC Power FC =

Women's soccer club in Washington, D.C.

DC Power Football Club
- Founded: 2024
- Stadium: Audi Field; Washington, D.C.
- Capacity: 20,000
- Club President: Jordan Stuart
- Head Coach: Omid Namazi
- League: Gainbridge Super League
- 2025–26: USL Super League, 6th of 9
- Website: dcpowerfootballclub.com
Home colors	Away colors

DC Power Football Club is an American professional women's soccer club based in Washington, D.C. that competes in the USL Super League (USLS).

== History ==
Washington, D.C., was named as one of the eight inaugural locations in the Gainbridge Super League on May 16, 2023. The club's name and branding were unveiled on May 20, 2024. Its founding ownership group includes Jordan Stuart, a prominent real estate executive and minority owner of Loudoun United FC; Devin Talbott, a part owner of D.C. United; and local business owner Jan Adams. Professional basketball player Angel Reese was announced as a part owner on May 21, 2024. Additional owners announced include professional baseball player Josiah Gray, professional hockey player Hendrix Lapierre, actress Crystal Renee Hayslett, professional football player Vernon Davis, business and sports executive Paxton Baker, and professional soccer player Donovan Pines.

On September 7, 2024, Jorian Baucom scored the first goal in DC Power FC history during a 1-1 draw against Dallas Trinity FC.

On October 11, 2024, Katelyn Duong delivered a corner kick that ended up in the net in the final seconds to give DC Power FC a 1-0 win against Brooklyn FC (USL) for the Club's first win in DC Power FC history.

On May 8, 2025, DC Power FC defeated Dallas Trinity FC 3-2 behind a second half brace from Loza Abera. This followed a 1-0 victory against Brooklyn FC (USL) on a goal from Gianna Gourley and clean sheet from Morgan Aquino on April 26, 2025, giving DC Power FC its first back-to-back wins in Club History.

DC Power Football Club offers academy player contracts, giving local talents the opportunity to develop on the professional stage. Academy players may be selected for game day rosters as a unique benefit to play critical minutes with Power FC in Gainbridge Super League matches while maintaining amateurism-status and retention of NCAA-eligibility. With all Gainbridge Super League games being featured nationally on Peacock TV, Academy Players will receive unrivaled exposure while playing for Power FC. At just 14 years old, academy signing Valentina Perrotta made history as the youngest player to appear in the starting lineup for a Gainbridge Super League Club in Power FC's 0-1 loss to Carolina Ascent FC on April 8, 2025.

DC Power FC finished the inaugural season in 7th place on the table out of 8 teams. Gianna Gourley, acquired on loan from Fort Lauderdale United FC at the midseason break, led the team in goals with 7 (all coming in the second half of the season). Gourley would finish tied for 8th among the league leaders in goals scored for the entire season despite appearing in only 14 out of a total 28 games with DC Power FC. Goalkeeper Morgan Aquino finished 4th among the league leaders in registered saves for the season with 58 and midfielder Katelyn Duong finished 5th in the league in chances created with 37. Defender Susanna Fitch was selected to the Gainbridge Super League All-League First Team for her notable performance throughout the 2024/25 season. Fitch tallied a team-high 2,507 minutes through 28 appearances (28 started)

=== Sponsorship ===
Period	Kit manufacturer	Shirt sponsor (front)	Shirt sponsor (back)	Sleeve sponsor	Ref.
2024–present	Capelli Sport	Agile Defense	VSI		

== Stadium ==
The club announced that they would play their inaugural season at Audi Field, which is also home to the Washington Spirit and D.C. United. On September 13, 2024, Fort Lauderdale United FC defeated DC Power FC 2-0 in the club's first ever home match played at Audi Field in front of an announced crowd of 4,719.

== Players and staff ==
=== Current roster ===
As of October 11, 2026

Note: Flags indicate national team as defined under FIFA eligibility rules; some limited exceptions apply. Players may hold more than one non-FIFA nationality.

No.	Pos.	Nation	Player
1	GK	USA	Katie Cappelletti
2	MF	USA	Anna Bagley
3	DF	USA	Susanna Fitch
4	DF	USA	Sarah McCoy
5	MF	USA	Emily Colton
6	DF	GUY	Sydney Cummings
7	MF	USA	Tatum Thomason
8	MF	USA	Abby Boyan
9	FW	USA	Kayla Colbert
10	FW	USA	Tyler Lussi
11	FW	USA	Alyssa Walker
12	DF	HAI	Claire Constant

No.	Pos.	Nation	Player
13	FW	USA	Gianna Gourley
16	MF	USA	Ellie Gilbert
17	FW	USA	Mak Whitham (on loan from Gotham FC)
18	MF	USA	Emma Jaskaniec
21	MF	USA	Tati Fung (on loan from Lexington SC)
22	DF	USA	Paige Almendariz
23	MF	USA	Justina Gaynor
25	DF	USA	Sam Angel (on loan from Chicago Stars FC)
28	DF	USA	Hallie Augustyn
30	FW	ETH	Loza Abera
43	GK	USA	Makenna Gottschalk

=== Former players ===
For details of former players, see Category:DC Power FC players and List of DC Power FC players.

=== Staff ===
As of July 30, 2025

Front Office
Position	Name
Club President	(United States) Jordan Stuart
Sporting Director / General Manager	(United States) Steve Birnbaum
Chief Financial Officer	(United States) Dan Franceschini
Chief Legal Officer	(United States) Jessica Wright
Technical Staff
Position	Name
Head Coach	(United States) Omid Namazi
Assistant Coach	(United States) Zaneta Wyne
Assistant Coach	(El Salvador) Pablo Amaya
Head of Goalkeeping	(United States) Brian Periman
Performance Coach	(Peru) Tabitha Galliani
Vice President of Team Operations	(England) Bircan Mustafa
Head Athletic Trainer	(United States) Emily Gumowitz
Head of Equipment	(United States) Nicole Miller
Mental Performance	(United States) Gaelin Hirabayashi

== Records ==
=== Year-by-year ===
Season	League	Regular season								Playoffs	Avg. attendance
Season	League	P	W	D	L	GF	GA	Pts	Pos	Playoffs	Avg. attendance
2024–25	USLS	28	5	9	14	24	41	24	7th	—	1,971
2025–26	USLS	0	0	0	0	0	0	0	—	—	—

=== Head coaching record ===
As of June 2, 2025

Only competitive matches are counted.*

All-time DC Power FC coaching records
Name	Nationality	From	To	P	W	D	L	GF	GA
Frédéric Brillant	France	May 20, 2024	November 27, 2024	13	3	4	6	7	15
Phil Nana (interim)	United States	November 27, 2024	July 10, 2025	15	2	5	8	17	26
Omid Namazi	United States	July 10, 2025	Present	0	0	0	0	0	0

=== Team records ===
As of June 5, 2026. Current players in bold. Statistics are updated once a year after the conclusion of the USL Super League season.

Most appearances
Player					Appearances		
#	Name	Nat.	Pos.	Power career	USLS	Playoffs	Total
1	**Anna Bagley**	(United States)	MF	2024–	51	0	51
2	**Loza Abera**	(Ethiopia)	FW	2024–	50	0	50
3	**Susanna Fitch**	(United States)	DF	2024–	45	0	45
4	Morgan Aquino	(Australia)	GK	2024–2026	40	0	40
5	**Claire Constant**	(United States)	DF	2024–	39	0	39
6	**Emily Colton**	(Japan)	MF	2025–	38	0	38
7	**Gianna Gourley**	(United States)	FW	2025–	37	0	37
7	Madison Murnin	(United States)	DF	2024–2026	37	0	37
9	Katie Duong	(United States)	MF	2024–2025	36	0	36
10	Katrina Guillou	(Philippines)	MF	2024–2026	30	0	30

Top goalscorers
Player					Goals scored		
#	Name	Nat.	Pos.	Power career	USLS	Playoffs	Total
1	**Gianna Gourley**	(United States)	FW	2025–	15	0	15
2	**Loza Abera**	(Ethiopia)	FW	2024–	12	0	12
3	**Alyssa Walker**	(United States)	FW	2026–	5	0	5
4	Dasia Torbert	(United States)	MF	2025–2026	4	0	4
5	Jaydah Bedoya	(Puerto Rico)	FW	2025–2026	3	0	3
5	Madison Wolfbauer	(United States)	DF	2024–2025	3	0	3
7	**Anna Bagley**	(United States)	MF	2024–	2	0	2
7	Allie Flanagan	(United States)	FW	2024–2025	2	0	2
7	**Susanna Fitch**	(United States)	DF	2024–	2	0	2
