= 2024–25 Brooklyn FC (women) season =

Inaugural Brooklyn FC season

Brooklyn FC
2024–25 season
- Head coach: Kristen Sample (interim, from 8 September 2024 to 23 September 2024); Jessica Silva (from 23 September 2024 to 16 April 2025); Fabio Barros (from 18 April 2025)
- Stadium: Commisso Soccer Stadium (Fall 2024); Maimonides Park (Spring 2025)
- USL Super League: 6th
- Top goalscorer: Jessica Garziano: 6 goals
- Highest home attendance: 2,830 (March 29, 2025 vs. TB)
- Lowest home attendance: 211 (October 15, 2024 vs. CAR)
- Average home league attendance: 1,208
- Biggest win: 3–0 (vs DC (A), November 13, 2024); 4–1 (vs FTL (A), May 3, 2025)
- Biggest defeat: 0–6 (vs DAL (A), March 9, 2025)
Home colors	Away colors
- All statistics correct as of 31 May 2025.

The 2024–25 season of Brooklyn FC was the team's inaugural season as a professional women's soccer team and as well as the first for the USL Super League (USLS), one of two leagues to be in the top tier of women's soccer in the United States.

During the fall half of the season, Brooklyn FC played at Commisso Soccer Stadium on the campus of Columbia University in Manhattan, whereas during the spring season they were able to play at their home in Maimonides Park. The club was forced to play in Manhattan due to issues installing the artificial pitch in Maimonides Park, which is a multi-purpose stadium and also hosts baseball.

Additionally, the club had three managers throughout the course of the season, going from interim coach Kristen Sample to head coach Jessica Silva in September 2024, before she was relieved of her duties in April 2025 due to lackluster performance.

== Roster and staff ==
=== Roster ===
As of 20 April 2025* Note: Flags indicate national team as defined under FIFA eligibility rules; some limited exceptions apply. Players may hold more than one non-FIFA nationality.

No.	Pos.	Nation	Player
1	GK	PUR	Sydney Martinez
2	DF	USA	Samantha Rosette
3	MF	USA	Samantha Kroeger
4	DF	USA	Allison Pantuso
5	DF	USA	Sasha Pickard
7	FW	MAR	Salma Amani
8	FW	USA	Dana Scheriff
9	FW	USA	Jessica Garziano
10	FW	ENG	Kess Elmore
12	MF	USA	Hope Breslin
13	MF	USA	Ginger Fontenot
14	FW	USA	Caroline Kelly
17	DF	USA	Leah Scarpelli (captain)

No.	Pos.	Nation	Player
18	GK	USA	Neeku Purcell
19	MF	USA	Mackenzie Pluck
20	DF	USA	Nikia Smith
21	MF	USA	Emily Yaple
22	DF	USA	Tori Hansen
23	FW	BRA	Luana Grabias
24	DF	USA	Kelsey Hill
25	MF	USA	Haley Miller
27	DF	USA	Carlyn Presley
28	DF	USA	Grace Phillpotts
31	FW	USA	Mackenzie George
33	GK	USA	Alexa Goldberg

=== Staff ===
As of August 10, 2024*

Front office
Position	Name
Owner	North Sixth Group
General Manager	TBD
Technical staff
Head Coach	Jessica Silva
Athletic Trainer	Daminska Estime

== Transfers ==
=== In ===
Player	Transferred from	Date	Ref.
(Puerto Rico) Sydney Martinez	(Norway) IK Grand Bodø	June 7, 2024	
(United States) Jessica Garziano	(United States) Long Island Rough Riders	June 24, 2024	
(United States) Leah Scarpelli	(Australia) Brisbane Roar FC	July 1, 2024	
(United States) Hope Breslin	(New Zealand) Wellington Phoenix FC	July 11, 2024	
(United States) Kess Elmore	(France) AS Saint Etienne	July 15, 2024	
(United States) Isabel Cox	(New Zealand) Wellington Phoenix FC	July 23, 2024	
Sasha Pickard	(United States) The University of Alabama	July 23, 2024	
(United States) Dana Scheriff	(Republic of Ireland) Athlone Town A.F.C.	July 25, 2024	
(United States) Allison Pantuso	(Sweden) IFK Kalmar	July 25, 2024	
(United States) Samantha Rosette	(France) RC de Strasbourg Alsace	July 30, 2024	
(United States) Tori Hansen	(United States) Orlando Pride	July 30, 2024	
(United States) Nikia Smith	(Israel) FC Ramat HaSharon	July 30, 2024	
(United States) Taylor Smith	(United States) NJ/NY Gotham FC	August 1, 2024	
(United States) Neeku Purcell	(United States) UCLA	August 6, 2024	
(United States) Mackenzie George	(Iceland) FH	August 6, 2024	
(United States) Kelsey Hill	(United States) Angel City FC	August 13, 2024	
(Brazil) Luana Grabias	(United States) Fort Lauderdale United FC	August 26, 2024	
(United States) Emily Yaple	(United States) The University of Pittsburgh	August 26, 2024	
(United States) Mackenzie Pluck	(United States) Gotham FC	August 26, 2024	
(Jamaica) Marlo Sweatman	(Hungary) Szent Mihály FC	August 30, 2024	
(Ethiopia) Yabeserra Rich	(United States) Greenville Liberty	September 6, 2024	
(United States) Carlyn Presley	(United States) Tormenta FC	September 6, 2024	
(United States) Haley Miller	(United States) Brooke House FC	September 6, 2024	
(United States) Alexa Goldberg	(United States) The University of Florida	January 21, 2025	
(United States) Grace Phillpotts	(United States) The University of Kentucky	January 22, 2025	
(United States) Caroline Kelly	(United States) Texas Christian University	April 1, 2025	
(United States) Ginger Fontenot	(United States) Penn State	April 1, 2025	

=== Out ===
Player	Transferred to	Date	Ref.
(United States) Taylor Smith	TBD	January 15, 2025	
(United States) Isabel Cox	Retired	January 22, 2025	
(Jamaica) Marlo Sweatman	Retired	March 11, 2025	
(Ethiopia) Yabeserra Rich	Departed club	March 11, 2025	

== Competitions ==
=== Friendlies ===
February 5, 2025 1	Napoli (Italy)	2–0	(United States) Brooklyn FC	Agnone, Italy
9:00 AM ET	(1st half) (2nd half)			Stadium: Stadio Civitelle

=== Regular season ===
Pos	Team	Pld	W	L	T	GF	GA	GD	Pts	Qualification
4	Fort Lauderdale United	28	11	8	9	35	33	+2	42 (Note: Head-to-head points: Fort Lauderdale 6, Spokane 3)	Playoffs
5	Spokane Zephyr	28	11	8	9	37	32	+5	42	
6	Brooklyn	28	10	9	9	30	34	−4	39	
7	DC Power	28	5	14	9	24	41	−17	24	
8	Lexington	28	4	18	6	29	62	−33	18	

Source: USL Super League
Rules for classification: 1) head-to-head points; 2) total goal differential; 3) total goals scored; 4) disciplinary points; 5) drawing of lots.

==== Results summary ====
Overall								Home						Away					
Pld	W	D	L	GF	GA	GD	Pts	W	D	L	GF	GA	GD	W	D	L	GF	GA	GD
28	10	9	9	30	34	−4	39	5	5	4	15	15	0	5	4	5	15	19	−4

Last updated: May 31, 2025.
Source: USLSuperLeague.com

==== Matches ====
August 31, 2024 1	Brooklyn FC	v	Carolina Ascent FC	New York, New York
				Stadium: Maimonides Park
Note: Match postponed due to field conditions at Maimonides Park, originally scheduled to play on August 31, 2024

September 8, 2024 2	Spokane Zephyr FC	1–1	Brooklyn FC	Spokane, Washington
9:00 PM EST	Ries (yellow card) 16', (goal) 35'; Canales (yellow card) 61'; Ulkekul (yellow card) 76'; Nino (yellow card) 86'	Report	Garziano 87'	Stadium: One Spokane Stadium; Attendance: 2,151; Referee: Adorae Monroy

September 14, 2024 3	Tampa Bay Sun FC	0–1	Brooklyn FC	Tampa, Florida
7:00 PM EST	Giammona (yellow card) 28'; Clark (yellow card) 82'; Hendrix (yellow card) 90+6'	Report	Cox 23'	Stadium: Riverfront Stadium; Attendance: 3,208; Referee: Melinda Sopka Homa

September 25, 2024 4	Brooklyn FC	2–0	Dallas Trinity	New York, New York
7:30 PM EST	Garziano 20'; George 38'; Breslin (penalty missed) 55'	Report	Brooks (yellow card) 58'	Stadium: Commisso Soccer Stadium; Attendance: 951; Referee: Marie Durr
Note: Match originally scheduled to be played at Maimonides Park but moved due to playing field issues.

September 28, 2024 5	Brooklyn FC	1–0	Lexington SC	New York, New York
7:30 PM EST	Presley (yellow card) 33'; Cox 47'; Kroeger (yellow card) 56'	Report	Winter (yellow card) 48'; Parsons (yellow card) 76'; Weeks (yellow card) 90'	Stadium: Commisso Soccer Stadium; Attendance: 951; Referee: Marie Durr
Note: Match originally scheduled to be played at Maimonides Park but moved due to playing field issues.

October 6, 2024 6	Fort Lauderdale United FC	1–0	Brooklyn FC	Davie, Florida
7:30 PM EST	Klein 82'	Report	Hill (yellow card) 89'	Stadium: FTL UTD Stadium; Attendance: 4,316; Referee: Jamie Padilla

October 11, 2024 7	Brooklyn FC	0–1	DC Power FC	New York, New York
7:30 PM EST	Breslin (yellow card) 87'	Report	Duong (yellow card) 13'; Hill 90+8' (o.g.)	Stadium: Commisso Soccer Stadium; Attendance: 1,284; Referee: Iryna Petrunok
Note: Match originally expected to play at Maimonides Park but changed due to field issues

October 15, 2024 1	Brooklyn FC	1–1	Carolina Ascent FC	New York, New York
7:30 PM EST	Breslin (yellow card) 19'; Pantuso 54'; Hill (yellow card) 72'; Pluck (yellow card) 89'; Grabias (yellow card) 90+3'	Report	Bedoya 22'; DeMarco (yellow card) 28'	Stadium: Commisso Soccer Stadium; Attendance: 211; Referee: Danielle Chesky
Note: Match originally scheduled for August 31 but was postponed

October 19, 2024 8	Carolina Ascent FC	2–0	Brooklyn FC	Charlotte, North Carolina
7:00 PM EST	Serepca 19', 74'	Report	Rosette (yellow card) 12'	Stadium: American Legion Memorial Stadium; Attendance: 4,223; Referee: Natalie Simon

October 23, 2024 12	Brooklyn FC	2–1	Tampa Bay Sun FC	New York, New York
7:30 PM EST	Scheriff 29'; Garziano 45+2' (pen.); Scarpelli (yellow card) 47'	Report	Nasello 5'; Edmonds (yellow card) 45+1'; Listro (yellow card) 45+3'; Moore (yellow card) 79'	Stadium: Commisso Soccer Stadium; Attendance: 242; Referee: Jaclyn Metz
Note: Match originally scheduled for November 23, 2024

October 27, 2024 9	Brooklyn FC	3–1	Fort Lauderdale United FC	New York, New York
2:00 PM EST	Pickard (yellow card) 11'; Kroeger 28'; Scheriff 31'; George 57'; Pantuso (yellow card) 87'; Pluck (yellow card) 89'	Report	Hamid (yellow card) 31'; Knox 71'	Stadium: Commisso Soccer Stadium; Attendance: 411; Referee: Thomas Snyder
Note: Match originally scheduled for October 26, 2024 but changed due to field issues at Maimonides Park

October 31, 2024 10	Brooklyn FC	1–0	Spokane Zephyr FC	New York, New York
7:30 PM EST	Grabias 14', (yellow card) 84'; Cox (yellow card) 86'; Elmore (yellow card) 88'	Report	Ayler (yellow card) 13'; Cummings (yellow card) 55'; Weinert (yellow card) 84'	Stadium: Commisso Soccer Stadium; Attendance: 699; Referee: Ekaterina Koroleva
Note: Match originally scheduled for November 2, 2024 but changed due to field issues at Maimonides Park

November 13, 2024 11	DC Power FC	0–3	Brooklyn FC	Washington, D.C.
7:30 PM EST		Report	Pantuso (yellow card) 14'; Grabias 31', 34', 44'; Kroeger (yellow card) 90+1'	Stadium: Audi Field; Attendance: Not reported Referee: Shawn Tehini

November 23, 2024 12	Brooklyn FC	v	Tampa Bay Sun FC	New York, New York
				Stadium: Maimonides Park
Note: Match re-scheduled to October 23, 2024 due to field issues at Maimonides Park

December 7, 2024 13	Lexington SC	0–3	Brooklyn FC	Lexington, Kentucky
7:00 PM EST	Yeong (yellow card) 84'	Report	George 13' (yellow card) 58'; Scarpelli (yellow card) 40'; Garziano 59'; Elmore (yellow card) 88'; Scheriff 90+2'	Stadium: Lexington SC Stadium; Attendance: 1,148; Referee: Trevor Wiseman

December 14, 2024 14	Dallas Trinity FC	0–1	Brooklyn FC	Dallas, Texas
3:30 PM EST	Hardeman (yellow card) 54'	Report	Cox 77'; Breslin (yellow card) 90'	Stadium: Cotton Bowl; Attendance: 3,467; Referee: Gerald Flores

February 22, 2025 15	Tampa Bay Sun FC	1–1	Brooklyn FC	Tampa, Florida
7:00 PM EST	Pluck 58', (yellow card) 82'	Report	Flint (yellow card) 36'; Moore 42'; Giammona (yellow card) 74'; Richardson (yellow card) 90+1'	Stadium: Riverfront Stadium; Attendance: 2,731; Referee: John Griggs

March 1, 2025 16	Lexington SC	0–0	Brooklyn FC	Lexington, Kentucky
7:00 PM EST		Report	Yaple (yellow card) 58'	Stadium: Lexington SC Stadium; Attendance: 1,147; Referee: Shawn Tehini

March 9, 2025 17	Dallas Trinity FC	6–0	Brooklyn FC	Dallas, Texas
5:00 PM EST	Ubogagu 6'; Abiodun (yellow card) 36'; Lancaster 45+2'; Thornton 68', 70'; Missimo 79'; Shepherd 88'	Report	Pantuso (yellow card) 52'; Scarpelli (yellow card) 56'	Stadium: Cotton Bowl; Attendance: 4,875; Referee: Jaclyn Metz

March 15, 2025 18	Brooklyn FC	0–2	Fort Lauderdale United FC	Brooklyn, New York
6:00 PM EST	coach (yellow card) 78'	Report	Gordon 32', 67'; Gaynor (yellow card) 90+1'; Baucom (yellow card) 90+4'	Stadium: Maimonides Park; Attendance: 2,000; Referee: Iryna Petrunok

March 19, 2025 19	Brooklyn FC	0–3	Dallas Trinity FC	Brooklyn, New York
7:30 PM EST	Pickard (yellow card) 38'; George (yellow card) 61'; Purcell (yellow card) 90+1'	Report	Lancaster 6'; Thornton 19' (yellow card) 55'; Brooks (yellow card) 31'; Strawn 58'; Brian (yellow card) 80'	Stadium: Maimonides Park; Attendance: 963; Referee: Katherine McCormick

March 23, 2025 20	DC Power FC	1–1	Brooklyn FC	Washington, D.C.
2:00 PM EST	Gourley 84'	Report	George 22'; Pickard (yellow card) 29'; Hill (yellow card) 88'	Stadium: Audi Field; Attendance: 2,406; Referee: Jamie Padilla

March 29, 2025 21	Brooklyn FC	2–2	Tampa Bay Sun FC	Brooklyn, New York
6:00 PM EST	Phillpotts 11'; Amani (yellow card) 19' (goal) 51'; Breslin (yellow card) 90+1'	Report	Flint 29' 90+4' (yellow card) 41'; Bessette (yellow card) 67'	Stadium: Maimonides Park; Attendance: 2,830; Referee: Stephanie McFarland

April 3, 2025 22	Spokane Zephyr FC	1–0	Brooklyn FC	Spokane, Washington
9:00 PM EST	Weinert 51'	Report		Stadium: One Spokane Stadium; Attendance: 2,044

April 12, 2025 23	Carolina Ascent FC	5–0	Brooklyn FC	Charlotte, North Carolina
4:00 p.m. CST	Butler 18'; Merrick 51'; Aguilera 65'; Harding 69'; Hylton 80'	Report	Grabias (yellow card) 59'	Stadium: American Legion Memorial Stadium; Attendance: 3,620; Referee: Edson Carvajal

April 19, 2025 24	Brooklyn FC	1–1	Lexington SC	Brooklyn, New York
6:00 PM EST	Grabias 60'	Report	Watson (yellow card) 3'; Moyer (yellow card) 19'; López 41' (yellow card) 52'; Grabias (yellow card) 74'	Stadium: Maimonides Park; Attendance: Not reported Referee: Gloria Martinez

April 26, 2025 25	Brooklyn FC	0–1	DC Power FC	Brooklyn, New York
6:00 PM EST	Scarpelli (yellow card) 45'	Report	Gourley 37'; Kurosaki (yellow card) 42'; Constant (yellow card) 60'	Stadium: Maimonides Park; Attendance: 1,525; Referee: Joshua Encarnación

May 3, 2025 26	Fort Lauderdale United FC	1–4	Brooklyn FC	Davie, Florida
7:30 PM EST	Gordon 26'; Brooks (yellow card) 30'; Smith (yellow card) 45'; Ansbrow (yellow card) 55'	Report	Garziano 19'; Kelly 56'; Breslin 59'; Brooks 61' (o.g.)	Stadium: FTL UTD Stadium; Attendance: 2,231; Referee: John Matto

May 10, 2025 27	Brooklyn FC	2–2	Spokane Zephyr FC	Brooklyn, New York
6:00 PM EST	Garziano 9'; Kely 17'; Pantuso (yellow card) 45+1'; Hansen (red card); Materazzi 19'	Report	Cummings 74'; Cook (yellow card) 76', (goal) 90+2'	Stadium: Maimonides Park; Attendance: 1,882; Referee: Marie Durr

May 24, 2025 28	Brooklyn FC	0–0	Carolina Ascent FC	Brooklyn, New York
6:00 PM EST	Pluck (yellow card) 40'	Report	Troccoli (yellow card) 42'	Stadium: Maimonides Park; Attendance: 1,500; Referee: Adorae Monroy

== Statistics ==
=== Appearances ===
As of match played 24 May 2025

Players with no appearances are not included on the list, italics indicate a loaned in player

No.	Player	Nat.	Total		Regular Season		Playoffs	
No.	Player	Nat.	Apps	Starts	Apps	Starts	Apps	Starts
Goalkeepers
1	Sydney Martinez	(Puerto Rico)	11	11	11	11	DNQ	
18	Neeku Purcell	(United States)	17	16	17	16	DNQ	
33	Alexa Goldberg	(United States)	1	1	1	1	DNQ	
Defenders
2	Samantha Rosette	(United States)	17	9	17	9	DNQ	
4	Allison Pantuso	(United States)	27	27	27	27	DNQ	
5	Sasha Pickard	(United States)	23	17	23	17	DNQ	
13	Ginger Fontenot	(United States)	2	0	2	0	DNQ	
17	Leah Scarpelli	(United States)	24	23	24	23	DNQ	
20	Nikia Smith	(United States)	3	1	3	1	DNQ	
22	Tori Hansen	(United States)	7	3	7	3	DNQ	
24	Kelsey Hill	(United States)	26	26	26	26	DNQ	
27	Carlyn Presley	(United States)	6	1	6	1	DNQ	
28	Grace Phillpotts	(United States)	6	5	6	5	DNQ	
Midfielders
3	Samantha Kroeger	(United States)	27	27	27	27	DNQ	
12	Hope Breslin	(United States)	23	14	23	14	DNQ	
19	Mackenzie Pluck	(United States)	22	19	22	19	DNQ	
21	Emily Yaple	(United States)	19	11	19	11	DNQ	
Forwards
7	Salma Amani	(Morocco)	10	4	10	4	DNQ	
8	Dana Scheriff	(United States)	19	6	19	6	DNQ	
9	Jessica Garziano	(United States)	26	25	26	25	DNQ	
10	Kess Elmore	(England)	9	0	9	0	DNQ	
14	Caroline Kelly	(United States)	4	3	4	3	DNQ	
23	Luana Grabias	(Brazil)	27	16	27	16	DNQ	
31	Mackenzie George	(United States)	27	27	27	27	DNQ	
Other players (Departed during season)
13	Isabel Cox	(United States)	14	7	14	7	DNQ	

=== Goalscorers ===
Last updated 24 May 2025

Rank	No.	Nat.	Name	USLS	Playoffs	Total
1	9	(United States)	Jessica Garziano	6	0	6
2	23	(Brazil)	Luana Grabias	5	0	5
3	31	(United States)	Mackenzie George	4	0	4
4	13	(United States)	Isabel Cox	3	0	3
4	8	(United States)	Dana Scheriff	3	0	3
6	14	(United States)	Caroline Kelly	2	0	2
7	3	(United States)	Samantha Kroeger	1	0	1
7	4	(United States)	Allison Pantuso	1	0	1
7	19	(United States)	Mackenzie Pluck	1	0	1
7	28	(United States)	Grace Phillpotts	1	0	1
7	7	(Morocco)	Salma Amani	1	0	1
7	12	(United States)	Hope Breslin	1	0	1
Own goals				1	0	1
Total				30	0	30

=== Assists ===
Last updated 24 May 2025

Rank	No.	Nat.	Name	USLS	Playoffs	Total
1	31	(United States)	Mackenzie George	5	0	5
2	19	(United States)	Mackenzie Pluck	4	0	4
3	23	(Brazil)	Luana Grabias	2	0	2
3	3	(United States)	Samantha Kroeger	2	0	2
3	12	(United States)	Hope Breslin	2	0	2
6	21	(United States)	Emily Yaple	1	0	1
6	28	(United States)	Grace Phillpotts	1	0	1
Total				15	0	15

=== Clean sheets ===
Last updated 24 May 2025

Rank	No.	Nat.	Name	USLS	Playoffs	Total
1	1	(Puerto Rico)	Sydney Martinez	4	0	4
1	18	(United States)	Neeku Purcell	4	0	4
1	33	(United States)	Alexa Goldberg	1	0	1
Total				9	0	9

=== Disciplinary record ===
Last updated 31 May 2025

Player			Regular Season			Playoffs			Total		
No.	Nat.	Name	Yellow card	(yellow card) (yellow-red card)	Red card	Yellow card	(yellow card) (yellow-red card)	Red card	Yellow card	(yellow card) (yellow-red card)	Red card
22	(United States)	Tori Hansen	0	0	1	0	0	0	0	0	1
12	(United States)	Hope Breslin	4	0	0	0	0	0	4	0	0
4	(United States)	Allison Pantuso	4	0	0	0	0	0	4	0	0
19	(United States)	Mackenzie Pluck	4	0	0	0	0	0	4	0	0
17	(United States)	Leah Scarpelli	4	0	0	0	0	0	4	0	0
5	(United States)	Sasha Pickard	3	0	0	0	0	0	3	0	0
24	(United States)	Kelsey Hill	3	0	0	0	0	0	3	0	0
23	(Brazil)	Luana Grabias	3	0	0	0	0	0	3	0	0
3	(United States)	Samantha Kroeger	3	0	0	0	0	0	3	0	0
10	(England)	Kess Elmore	2	0	0	0	0	0	2	0	0
31	(United States)	Mackenzie George	2	0	0	0	0	0	2	0	0
13	(United States)	Isabel Cox	1	0	0	0	0	0	1	0	0
27	(United States)	Carlyn Presley	1	0	0	0	0	0	1	0	0
2	(United States)	Samantha Rosette	1	0	0	0	0	0	1	0	0
21	(United States)	Emily Yaple	1	0	0	0	0	0	1	0	0
18	(United States)	Neeku Purcell	1	0	0	0	0	0	1	0	0
7	(Morocco)	Salma Amani	1	0	0	0	0	0	1	0	0
Total			38	0	1	0	0	0	38	0	1
