= Javier Chila =

Ecuadorian footballer (born 1984)

Personal information
- Full name: Bernardo Javier Chila Ayovi
- Date of birth: 14 July 1984 (age 42)
- Place of birth: Muisne, Esmeraldas, Ecuador
- Position: Defender

Team information
- Current team: Morris Elite

Youth career
- 2002–2003: El Nacional

Senior career*
Years	Team	Apps	(Gls)
2004–2006	El Nacional	2	(0)
2005	→Macará (loan)	6	(0)
2006	→Azogues (loan)	29	(2)
2007–2008	Olmedo	26	(0)
2008	Universidad Católica	22	(1)
2009-2010	Deportivo Cuenca	20	(2)
2010–2012	El Nacional	104	(9)
2013	Deportivo Quito	13	(1)
2014	Olmedo	25	(1)
2015-2018	Fuerza Amarilla	85	(0)
2019–2020	Miami United	0	(0)
2021–	Morris Elite	0	(0)
- * Club domestic league appearances and goals as of 03:23, 8 April 2009 (UTC)

Bernardo Javier Chila Ayovi (born July 14, 1984) is an Ecuadorian footballer who plays for Morris Elite in the USL League Two.

== Club career ==
Chila began his professional career with El Nacional. He only appeared in two games for Nacional before being loaned out to Macará and Azogues during the early part of his career.

In 2007, he was sold by Nacional, joining Olmedo, where he played 26 games in his first season at the club. Only a season passed when he was sold to Universidad Católica where he went on to score his first goal in Serie A.

In 2009, he became one of the new reinforcements of Deportivo Cuenca to reinforce their defense for their Copa Libertadores 2009 campaign. After a short stint with Deportivo Cuenca, he returned to El Nacional in 2010, where he would spend the next few seasons as a regular starter for the club. On 4 March 2011, Chila scored a brace, including one on a free kick, in a 2–0 victory over Emelec. On 30 November 2011, Chila scored the winning goal in a 1–0 victory over Deportivo Quito at the Estadio Olímpico Atahualpa.

During January 2013, Chila signed with Deportivo Quito. He remained at the club for one year. On 9 December 2013 he signed for Olmedo, re-joining the club as a key signing for the 2014 season.

For the 2015 season Chila joined newly promoted Ecuadorian Serie B club Fuerza Amarilla and helped them gain promotion to the top flight for the first time in the clubs history. In 2016 helped the club to an 8th-place finish in its debut season in the top flight and qualification to the Copa Sudamericana 2017.

In 2019, he was recruited by Ferdinando De Matthaeis to play for Miami United of the National Premier Soccer League, moving abroad for the first time in his career. On 11 February 2021 Chila signed with Morris Elite to play for the club in the 2021 USL League Two season.
