= Vincenzo Bernardo =

American soccer player (born 1990)

Personal information
- Full name: Vincenzo Bernardo
- Date of birth: May 22, 1990 (age 36)
- Place of birth: Morristown, New Jersey, U.S.
- Height: 5 ft 6 in (1.68 m)
- Positions: Midfielder; forward

Youth career
- 1995–2001: Madison Area YMCA
- 2002–2003: Morris United
- 2004–2006: New York Red Bulls
- 2006–2008: Napoli

Senior career*
Years	Team	Apps	(Gls)
2008–2009	Napoli	0	(0)
2010–2011	FC Höchst	15	(8)
2011	Harrisburg City Islanders	1	(0)
2012–2013	Deportivo Guastatoya	35	(12)
2013–2014	Antigua GFC	14	(5)
2015	Miami United	12	(7)
2015–2016	Miami Fusion FC	12	(5)

International career
2007–2008	United States U17	2	(1)
2008	United States U20	5	(2)
- * Club domestic league appearances and goals

Vincenzo Bernardo (born May 22, 1990) is an American former soccer player. After his career, he founded Morris Elite SC, which currently competes in USL League Two.

== Career ==
=== Club ===
Bernardo grew up in New Jersey, moving to Italy at age sixteen to pursue his professional soccer career. Prior to moving to Italy he played for the MetroStars U-17 and U-19 Teams. He joined Napoli in 2006 playing for the Napoli primavera squad. With Napoli Bernardo was primarily deployed as an attacking midfielder or as a second striker.

After leaving Napoli, Bernardo went on trial with several Major League Soccer clubs. He eventually signed with Austrian club FC Höchst in January 2011. After a successful stay in Austria, Bernardo returned to the United States signing with Harrisburg City Islanders, where he had a brief stay. In 2012 Bernardo would move abroad once again, this time to Guatemala with Deportivo Guastatoya. In his one season at the club Bernardo impressed scoring 12 goals in 35 matches.

For the 2014 season Bernardo returned to the United States signing with NPSL side Miami United FC. He appeared in 12 matches for the team scoring 7 goals. The following season he signed with Miami Fusion FC, being the first player to sign for the club.

=== International ===
Bernardo has also been involved with the United States national team since the U-15 level, and has played for the United States U-17 and United States U-20 national team. He has denied rumors that he is interested in following Giuseppe Rossi in playing for Italy, stressing his desire to "become an important player for [the U.S.] in the future."

=== Management ===
After his career, he founded youth soccer club Morris Elite SC in 2016, the club has a men's team currently competing in USL League Two and a women's team in USL W League.

Vincenzo also is a minority owner of the New York Cosmos, and in October of 2026 was named interim sporting director of the club.
