= Daniel Mendes =

Daniel Mendes may refer to:

- Daniel Mendes (footballer, born 1981), Brazilian footballer
- Daniel Mendes (footballer, born 1993), Brazilian footballer
