= Mackenzie Pluck =

American soccer player (born 2000)

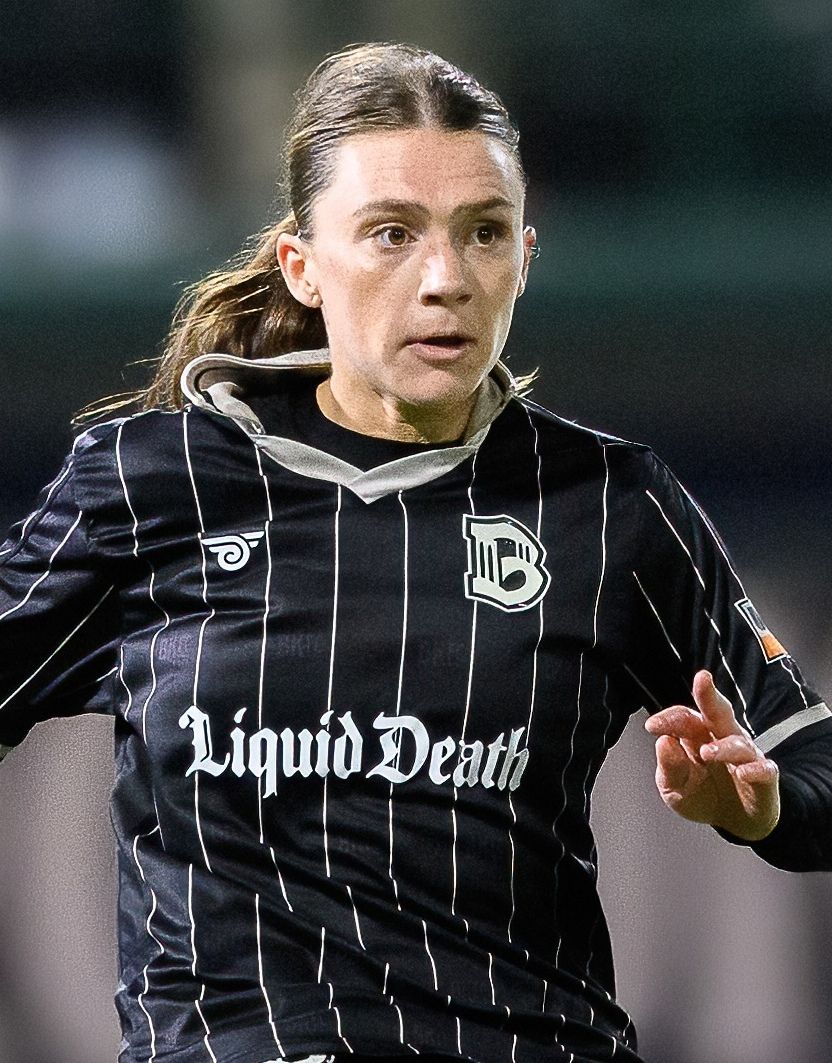
- Pluck playing for Brooklyn FC in 2025

Personal information
- Full name: Mackenzie Grace Pluck
- Date of birth: April 12, 2000 (age 26)
- Place of birth: North Wales, Pennsylvania, United States
- Height: 5 ft 4 in (1.63 m)
- Position: Midfielder

Youth career
- 2013–2015: FC Bucks
- 2015–2018: Players Development Academy

College career
Years	Team	Apps	(Gls)
2018–2022	Duke Blue Devils	107	(21)

Senior career*
Years	Team	Apps	(Gls)
2023	Angel City FC	1	(0)
2024	NJ/NY Gotham FC	0	(0)
2024–2025	Brooklyn FC	23	(1)
2025	Tampa Bay Sun	13	(0)

International career^{‡}
2014	United States U14		
2015	United States U16		
- * Club domestic league appearances and goals as of 00:59, December 22, 2025 (UTC) ‡ National team caps and goals as of January 25, 2025

Mackenzie Grace Pluck (born April 12, 2000) is an American former professional soccer player who played as a midfielder. She played college soccer for the Duke Blue Devils, where she set the program record in career appearances. She spent three years playing professionally, first for NWSL clubs Angel City FC and NJ/NY Gotham FC, and later for USL Super League clubs Brooklyn FC and Tampa Bay Sun FC.

== Early life ==
Pluck was born in Pennsylvania and grew up in North Wales. She went to high school at Germantown Academy, where she scored 80 goals and tallied 41 assists. Pluck also was a co-captain for Germantown and helped the team reach a state championship in 2015. In high school, Pluck was also a two-year letterwinner in volleyball. Outside of school, Pluck played club soccer with FC Bucks before switching to Player Development Academy in 2015 in order to maximize college recruitment chances. In 2018, Pluck was named to the All-American East Best XI.

== College career ==
After committing to Duke University in high school, Pluck started playing with the Blue Devils in 2018. She scored her first college goal on August 16, 2018, tallying just two minutes into the second half in a 2–0 victory over Ohio State. In her seasons as a junior, senior, and grad student, Pluck helped lead the team to three consecutive NCAA Tournament appearances. She starred in 16 NCAA matches across the three tournaments, the fifth-highest of any Duke player. She played in all of Duke's matches in three of her five seasons, racking up a program-leading 107 games. She also scored 21 goals and tallied 29 assists in her time as a Blue Devil. During her career at Duke, Pluck was twice named to the All-ACC Academic Team and was recognized on the ACC Honor Roll on four separate occasions.

== Club career ==
=== Angel City ===
Pluck registered for the 2023 NWSL Draft but went undrafted. She later received an invite to Angel City FC's preseason camp. After two weeks of training with the team as a trialist, Pluck signed a one-year contract with Angel City. She made her professional debut on April 20, 2023, in an NWSL Challenge Cup game against the OL Reign. Pluck later went on to make 4 other Challenge Cup appearances, all of which as a substitute. She made her only National Women's Soccer League regular season appearance on May 13, coming in as a substitute for Claire Emslie in the 89th minute of a loss to the Washington Spirit. At the end of the 2023 season, Angel City opted not to renew Pluck's contract.

Following her stint at Angel City, Pluck joined Racing Louisville FC as a non-roster invitee during 2024 preseason. She did not sign a contract with the club.

=== NJ/NY Gotham FC ===
In February 2024, Pluck was named as a non-roster invitee on NJ/NY Gotham FC's roster, her third time as an NWSL NRI in two years. After training with Gotham throughout 2024, she signed a national team replacement contract on July 18. Two days later, Pluck made her club debut in an NWSL x Liga MX Femenil Summer Cup game against the Chicago Red Stars. Gotham's next match, a Summer Cup fixture against the Washington Spirit, drew large support from Pluck's friends, family, and fans, due to Subaru Park's proximity to Pluck's hometown. She ended up entering the match as a substitute for former Duke teammate Ella Stevens and was able to play in front of her home crowd. Pluck made one more Summer Cup appearance before her short-term contract with Gotham expired.

=== Brooklyn FC ===
On August 26, 2024, Pluck signed with USL Super League team Brooklyn FC ahead of the club's inaugural season. After leading the league in duels won and having recorded two assists, she was named to the league's October Team of the Month, alongside teammate Samantha Kroeger. On February 24, 2025, Pluck scored her first goal with Brooklyn FC, a powerful strike in a 1–1 draw with Tampa Bay Sun FC. Her goal was later nominated for the league's Goal of the Month award.

=== Tampa Bay Sun ===
Pluck joined Tampa Bay Sun on August 8, 2025. She made her club debut on August 23, starting and playing 64 minutes in the Sun's season-opener against her former team, Brooklyn FC. She recorded 13 appearances for the Sun over the first half of the 2025–26 season. In January 2026, Pluck announced her retirement from professional soccer.

== International career ==
Pluck has represented the United States internationally at U-14 and U-16 levels. She was called into U14 camps three times in 2014 and U16 camps at the beginning of 2015.

== Personal life ==
Pluck is an avid artist. During the COVID-19 pandemic, she launched a graphic illustration business on Instagram called Scribble Bird. In 2023, Pluck gave handmade drawings to each of her teammates on Angel City FC who attended the 2023 FIFA Women's World Cup, depicting the players representing their respective national teams.

== Career statistics ==
=== Club ===
Appearances and goals by club, season and competition
Club	Season	League			Cup (Note: Includes the NWSL Challenge Cup)		Playoffs (Note: Includes NWSL Playoffs and USL Super League Playoffs)		Other		Total	
Club	Season	Division	Apps	Goals	Apps	Goals	Apps	Goals	Apps	Goals	Apps	Goals
Angel City FC	2023	NWSL	1	0	5	0	0	0	—		6	0
NJ/NY Gotham FC	2024	NWSL	0	0	0	0	0	0	2 (Note: Includes the NWSL x Liga MX Femenil Summer Cup)	0	2	0
Brooklyn FC	2024–25	USL Super League	23	0	—		—		—		23	0
Tampa Bay Sun FC	2025–26	USL Super League	13	0	—		—		—		13	0
Career total			37	0	5	0	0	0	2	0	44	0

== Honors ==
=== Individual ===
- USL Super League Team of the Month: October 2024
