= DePalo =

DePalo is a surname. Notable people with the surname include:

- Giuseppe DePalo (born 1971), Italian football coach and former midfielder
- Paul DePalo, American politician

== See also ==
- Matteo De Palo (born 2007), Italian racing driver
