= Luana Grabias =

Brazilian footballer (born 2000)

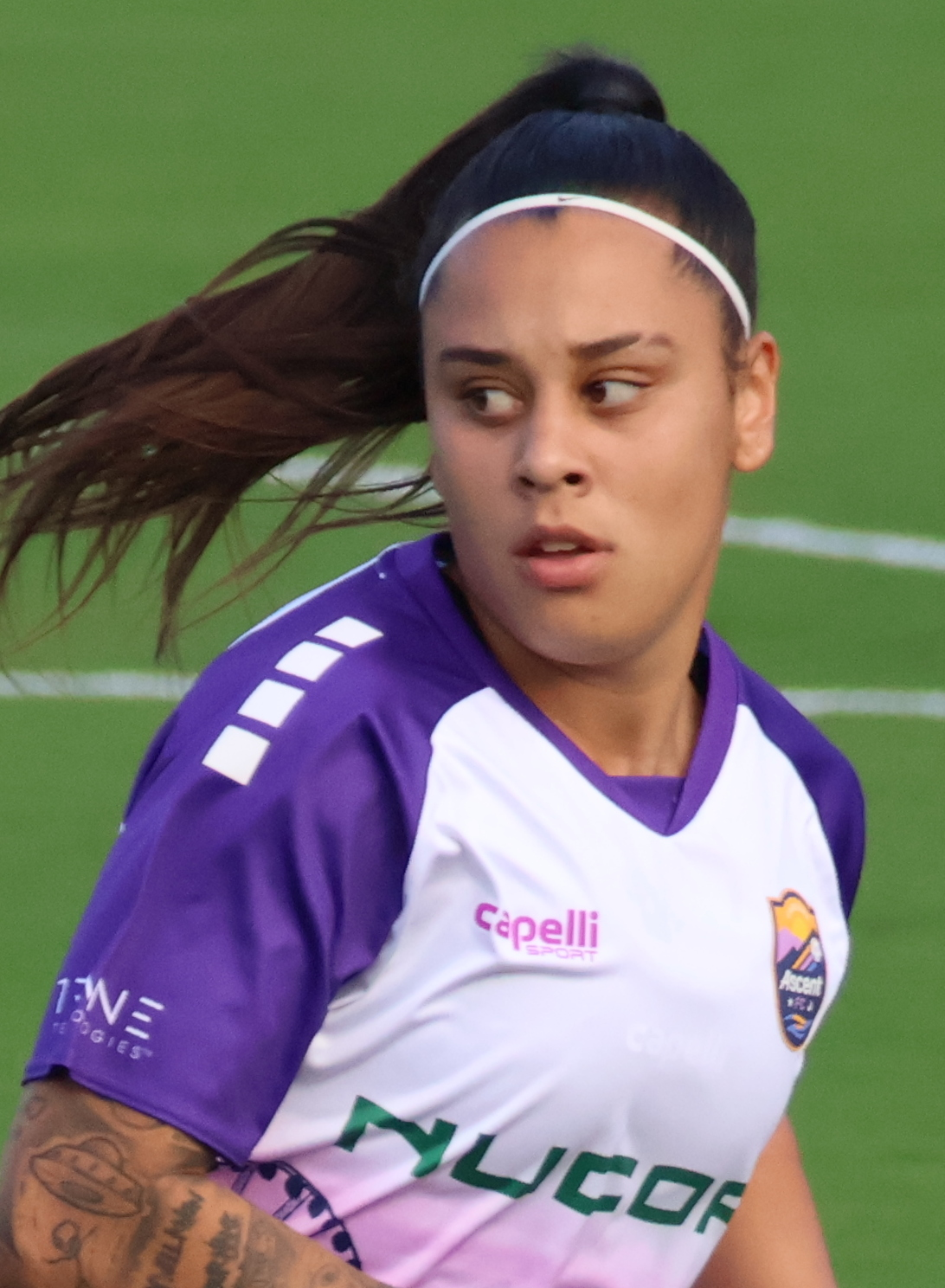
- Grabias with the Carolina Ascent in 2025

Personal information
- Full name: Luana Karoline Grabias
- Date of birth: 7 February 2000 (age 26)
- Place of birth: São José dos Pinhais, Paraná, Brazil
- Height: 5 ft 6 in (1.68 m)
- Position: Forward

College career
Years	Team	Apps	(Gls)
2019–2021	Monroe Mustangs	28	(36)
2022–2023	Nova Southeastern Sharks	31	(23)

Senior career*
Years	Team	Apps	(Gls)
2024	Fort Lauderdale United	0	(0)
2024–2025	Brooklyn FC	27	(5)
2025–2026	Carolina Ascent	6	(0)

International career^{‡}
2013–2014	Brazil U-15		
2015–2016	Brazil U-17		
2019	Brazil U-20		
- * Club domestic league appearances and goals as of 02:24, 29 October 2026 (UTC) ‡ National team caps and goals as of June 6, 2025

Luana Karoline Grabias (born 7 February 2000, São José dos Pinhais, Paraná, Brazil) is a Brazilian footballer who plays as a forward. She played college soccer for the Monroe Mustangs and the Nova Southeastern Sharks before starting her professional career with USL Super League clubs Fort Lauderdale United FC, Brooklyn FC, and the Carolina Ascent.

== Early life ==
Although born in São José dos Pinhais, Grabias grew up in Chapecó, Santa Catarina. Her early development in football took place in Brazil before she moved to the United States to pursue her collegiate career. She played on the international youth level for Brazil, representing their U-15, U-17, and U-20 teams.

== College career ==
=== Monroe Mustangs ===
Grabias moved to the United States to pursue higher education and collegiate soccer. While playing for Monroe College in 2019 and 2021, she appeared in 28 matches, starting 25 of them. She scored 36 goals across the two seasons. Her college career was interrupted in 2020 due to the COVID-19 pandemic, which caused the cancellation of that year's competition.

=== Nova Southeastern Sharks ===
She transferred to Nova Southeastern University prior to the 2022 season. While playing for Nova in 2022 and 2023, respectively, she played a total of 31 matches, starting 28. She scored 23 goals for the Sharks. She received several individual honors, including Player of the Year and Offensive Player of the Year awards in 2022, and a selection to the All–Sun Conference First Team in 2023.

== Club career ==
To start her professional career, Grabias signed with Fort Lauderdale United FC. She was later transferred to Brooklyn FC in what would be the first ever team-to-team transfer in the USL Super League.

On 31 October 2024, in only her second start for Brooklyn FC, Grabias scored her first goal for the club in the 14th minute — a composed curling finish from just outside the box — to secure a 1–0 victory over Spokane Zephyr FC. The win helped Brooklyn climb to second place in the USL Super League with 20 points after 11 games. On 13 November 2024, she recorded the club's first-ever hat-trick, scoring three times in a victory over DC Power FC. For her efforts, she was named to USL Super League Team of the Month for November 2024. During the 2024–25 season with Brooklyn, she made 27 appearances and scored five goals in league play.

On 3 July 2025, Grabias signed with Carolina Ascent FC. In October 2026, she mutually parted ways with the Ascent after having appeared 6 times in her first season and zero times in her second season with the club.

== Honors and awards ==
Individual

- USL Super League Team of the Month: November 2024
- Sun Conference Player of the Year: 2022
- Sun Conference Offensive Player of the Year: 2022
- First-team All-Sun Conference: 2023
