= Sasha Pickard =

American soccer player (born 2000)

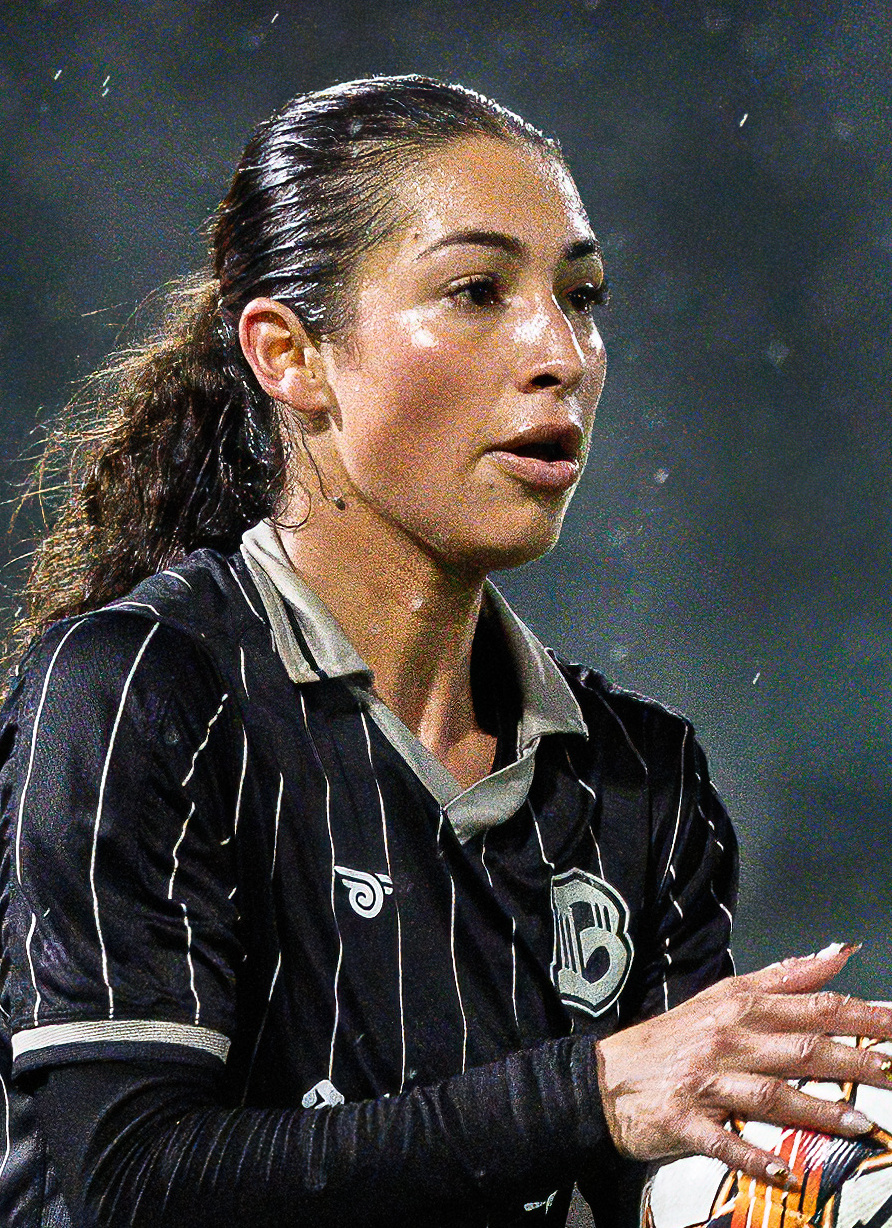
- Pickard playing for Brooklyn FC in 2025

Personal information
- Full name: Sasha Mae Pickard
- Date of birth: October 28, 2000 (age 26)
- Place of birth: Laguna Hills, California
- Height: 5 ft 7 in (1.70 m)
- Position: Defender

Team information
- Current team: Santos Laguna
- Number: 3

College career
Years	Team	Apps	(Gls)
2019–2023	Alabama Crimson Tide	100	(0)

Senior career*
Years	Team	Apps	(Gls)
2024–2025	Brooklyn FC	23	(0)
2025–	Santos Laguna	12	(0)
- * Club domestic league appearances and goals as of February 5, 2026

Sasha Mae Pickard (born October 28, 2000) is an American soccer player who plays as a defender for Liga MX Femenil club Santos Laguna.

== Early life ==
Pickard played youth soccer with the Mountain View Los Altos Soccer Club and attended Saratoga High School, where she also participated in cross country and track. Pickard committed to play for the University of Alabama in 2018 during her senior year.

== College career ==
Pickard played for the Alabama for five seasons and is recognized as one of the most accomplished players in program history. She became just the third player in school history to reach 100 game appearances and finished with a program-record 8,170 minutes played.

In 2022, Pickard was an integral part of a dominant Alabama team that included future professional players such as: Reyna Reyes, Riley Tanner, Ashlynn Serepca, Felicia Knox and Riley Parker. Together, they helped Alabama reach its first-ever NCAA semifinal appearance during the 2022 NCAA women's soccer tournament. Alabama ultimately lost to UCLA in the semifinals. Alabama finished with a final season record of 23–1–1.

Pickard's contributions at Alabama earned her multiple honors, including Second Team All-SEC, SEC All-Tournament Team, and a spot on the College Soccer News Team of the Week.

== Club career ==
=== Brooklyn FC ===
Pickard went undrafted in the 2024 NWSL Draft, but on July 23, 2024, Brooklyn FC announced that Pickard had signed with the club ahead of the inaugural USL Super League season. She played in Brooklyn's inaugural match against Spokane Zephyr on September 8, 2024, coming into the match in the 84th minute.

=== Santos Laguna ===
On 18 July 2025, Liga MX Femenil club Santos Laguna announced that Pickard was joining the club after her exit from Brooklyn FC.

== Career statistics ==
=== College ===
College	Regular Season				SEC Tournament		NCAA Tournament		Total	
College	Conference	Season	Apps	Goals	Apps	Goals	Apps	Goals	Apps	Goals
Alabama Crimson Tide	SEC	2019	13	0	1	0	0	0	14	0
Alabama Crimson Tide	SEC	2020–21	14	0	1	0	0	0	15	0
Alabama Crimson Tide	SEC	2021	19	0	1	0	2	0	22	0
Alabama Crimson Tide	SEC	2022	19	0	3	0	5	0	27	0
Alabama Crimson Tide	SEC	2023	19	0	1	0	2	0	22	0
Career total			84	0	7	0	9	0	100	0

=== Club ===
As of January 25, 2025

Club	Season	League			League Cup		Total	
Club	Season	Division	Apps	Goals	Apps	Goals	Apps	Goals
Brooklyn FC	2024–25	USL Super League	14	0	0	0	14	0
Career total			14	0	0	0	14	0
