= Daniel Mendes (footballer, born 1993) =

Brazilian footballer

Personal information
- Full name: Daniel de Souza Mendes
- Date of birth: 1 March 1993 (age 33)
- Position: Midfielder

Youth career
- –2015: Schulz Academy

Senior career*
Years	Team	Apps	(Gls)
2016	Miami Fusion	0	(0)
2017–2018	Austria Klagenfurt	28	(0)
- * Club domestic league appearances and goals as of 16:28, 10 December 2018 (UTC)

Daniel de Souza Mendes (born 1 March 1993), known simply as Daniel Mendes, is a Brazilian footballer who plays as a midfielder.

== Career statistics ==
=== Club ===
As of 10 December 2018.

Club	Season	League			Cup		Other		Total	
Club	Season	Division	Apps	Goals	Apps	Goals	Apps	Goals	Apps	Goals
Miami Fusion	2016	National Premier Soccer League	0	0	0	0	0	0	0	0
Austria Klagenfurt	2016–17	Austrian Regionalliga	11	0	0	0	0	0	11	0
Austria Klagenfurt	2017–18	Austrian Regionalliga	17	0	1 (Note: Appearances in the Austrian Cup)	0	0	0	18	0
Austria Klagenfurt	2018–19	2. Liga	0	0	1	0	0	0	1	0
Career total			28	0	2	0	0	0	30	0
