= Kess Elmore =

English footballer (born 1998)

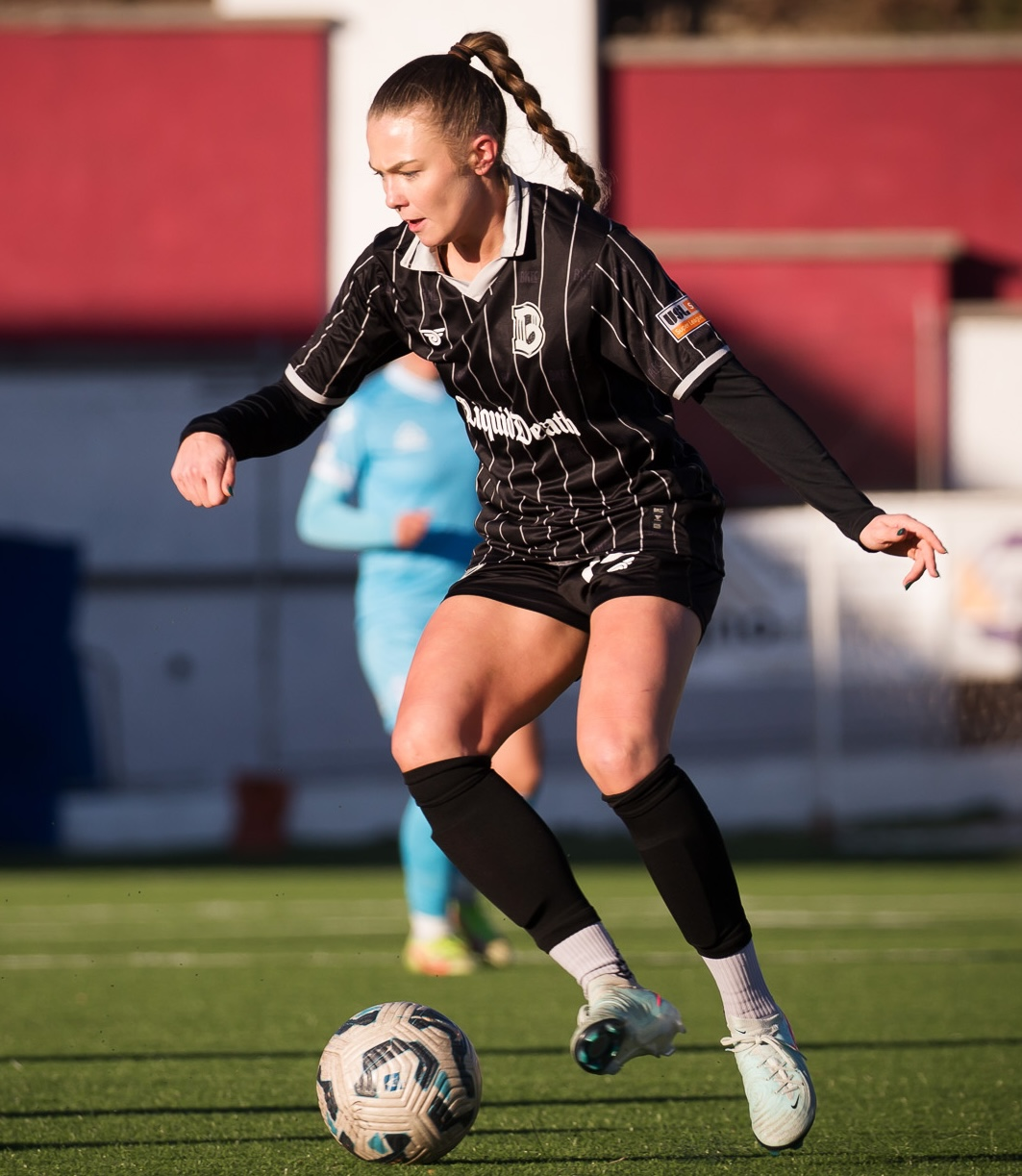
- Elmore in action for Brooklyn FC

Personal information
- Full name: Kess Elizabeth Elmore
- Date of birth: 1 November 1998 (age 28)
- Place of birth: Liverpool, England
- Height: 5 ft 5 in (1.65 m)
- Position: Forward

Team information
- Current team: Sparta Prague
- Number: 18

Youth career
- 2011–2017: Liverpool F.C.

College career
Years	Team	Apps	(Gls)
2017–2021	UConn Huskies	46	(12)
2021–2022	Oregon Ducks	30	(5)

Senior career*
Years	Team	Apps	(Gls)
2023–2024	AS Saint-Étienne	14	(3)
2024–2025	Brooklyn FC	11	(0)
2025–2026	St. Pölten	16	(5)
2026–	Sparta Prague	6	(1)

International career^{‡}
2014–2015	England U17	6	(0)
2016	England U19	1	(1)
2026–	Northern Ireland	1	(1)
- * Club domestic league appearances and goals as of 16:43, 14 October 2026 (UTC) ‡ National team caps and goals as of 14 October 2026

Kess Elizabeth Elmore (born 1 November 1998) is an English professional footballer who plays as a forward for Czech Women's First League club Sparta Prague and the Northern Ireland women's national team.

== Early life ==
Elmore played for Liverpool's youth team, earning Liverpool Player of the Year in 2011, 2013, 2014 and 2015. On 1 June 2014, Elmore scored the lone goal in Liverpool's victory over local rivals, Everton, in the final of the FA Girls's Youth Cup. Elmore also featured for the reserve and first team during her time at Liverpool.

== College career ==
=== UConn Huskies, 2017–2021 ===
Elmore experienced early success during her freshman year, playing in all 17 matches for the Huskies. She scored her first goal on 3 September 2017, in her third game against Central Connecticut, and added a second goal in the same match, marking her first career brace. Four days later, she scored the game-winning goal in the 99th minute against Arkansas. She was named to the All-Conference and All-Rookie Team.

Elmore missed the entirety of the 2018 season due to a torn ACL.

In 2019, Elmore lead the Huskies in goals, assists, and points. She scored three goals in the spring, including two game-winners, and tallied four goals and six assists in the fall, earning a spot on the American Athletic Conference Second Team.

=== Oregon Ducks, 2021–2022 ===
In 2021, Elmore transferred to the University of Oregon. In her first season, Elmore started in all 19 matches, contributing three goals and one assist, with one of the goals being a game-winner against Arizona State.

In Elmore's final year of eligibility, she missed the first eight matches due to injury. She returned to action on 23 September 2022, scoring a goal in Oregon's 2–0 upset of No. 15 Washington. Later, she scored the team's lone goal in a 1–1 draw against No. 25 California.

== Club career ==
=== AS Saint-Étienne ===
After college, Elmore signed with French club AS Saint-Étienne. She made her professional debut on 16 September 2023, coming on as a substitute in the 64th minute during a 0–2 loss to Stade de Reims. Elmore scored her first professional goal on 18 November 2023, securing the game-winner in the 72nd minute of a 2–1 away victory against Lille.

=== Brooklyn FC ===
On 15 July 2024, it was announced that Elmore had joined Brooklyn FC for the club's inaugural season in the new USL Super League. She was the club's 5th signing, after Hope Breslin. Elmore made her club debut on 6 October 2024, coming on as a second half substitute for Jessica Garziano against Fort Lauderdale in an away match that was also Fort Lauderdale's inaugural home opener.

=== St. Pölten ===
On 30 June 2025, Elmore joined Austrian champions St. Pölten.

=== Sparta Prague ===
On 7 July 2026, Elmore signed a multi-year contract with Czech Women's First League club Sparta Prague. She made her league debut for the club on 22 August 2026 appearing as a substitute in a 3–1 home win against Slovan Liberec, scoring Sparta's second goal.

== International career ==
=== Youth ===
Elmore represented the England women's national under-17 team in 2014 and 2015. Her first call-up came in October 2014. She made her debut as a substitute, coming on in the 55th minute for Alessia Russo during the 2015 UEFA Women's Under-17 Championship qualification against Moldova on 26 October 2014. She got her first start two days later in a 5–0 victory over Bulgaria.

Elmore received a call up to the England women's national under-19 team on 14 July 2016 for a friendly against the United States. She entered the match in the 65th minute replacing Alessia Russo and scored the equalizing goal in the 88th minute securing a 2–2 draw.

In 2017, Elmore was called up to the England under-20 squad for the U20 Nike International Tournament, a friendly tournament that featured England, Finland Brazil and the United States.

=== Senior ===
Elmore made her senior international debut for Northern Ireland in the starting lineup during a 3–1 away defeat to Portugal in the 2027 FIFA Women's World Cup qualification – UEFA play-offs on 13 October 2026. She scored the only goal of her team.

== Career statistics ==
=== International ===
As of 13 October 2026

Appearances and goals by national team and year
National team	Year	Apps	Goals
Northern Ireland	2026	1	1
Total		1	1

List of international goals scored by Kess Elmore
No.	Date	Venue	Opponent	Score	Result	Competition
1.	13 October 2026	Estádio Municipal de Portimão, Portimão, Portugal	Portugal	1–0	1–3	2027 FIFA Women's World Cup qualification play-offs

== Personal life ==
Elmore earned a Bachelor of Science in Sports Management from the University of Connecticut. She then earned a Master of Science degree in Sports Product Management, which she completed in 2023 from the University of Oregon.

== Career statistics ==
=== College ===
College	Regular Season				Conference Championship		Total	
College	Conference	Season	Apps	Goals	Apps	Goals	Apps	Goals
UConn Huskies	AAC	2017	16	5	1	0	17	5
UConn Huskies	AAC	2018	DNP				0	0
UConn Huskies	AAC	2019	17	4	—		17	4
UConn Huskies	Big East	2020–21	12	3	—		12	3
UConn Huskies	Total		45	12	1	0	46	12
Oregon Ducks	Pac 12	2021	19	3	—		19	3
Oregon Ducks	Pac 12	2022	11	2	—		11	2
Oregon Ducks	Total		30	5	0	0	30	5
Career total			75	17	1	0	76	17

=== Club ===
As of 13 December 2024

Club	Season	League			Domestic Cup		Other		Total	
Club	Season	Division	Apps	Goals	Apps	Goals	Apps	Goals	Apps	Goals
AS Saint-Étienne	2023–24	Première Ligue	14	3	0	0	0	0	14	3
Brooklyn FC	2024–25	USL Super League	4	0	0	0	0	0	4	0
Career total			18	3	0	0	0	0	18	3
