= Isabel Cox =

American soccer player (born 2000)

Personal information
- Full name: Isabel McRae Cox
- Date of birth: December 13, 2000 (age 25)
- Place of birth: Greensboro, North Carolina
- Height: 5 ft 10 in (1.78 m)
- Position: Forward

College career
Years	Team	Apps	(Gls)
2019–2023	North Carolina Tar Heels	110	(15)

Senior career*
Years	Team	Apps	(Gls)
2023–2024	Wellington Phoenix	13	(3)
2024	Brooklyn FC	14	(3)

International career
2019	United States U20		
- * Club domestic league appearances and goals as of December 14, 2024

Isabel McRae Cox (born December 13, 2000) is an American former soccer player who played as a striker. She played college soccer for the North Carolina Tar Heels, where she made the most appearances in program history. She played professionally for Wellington Phoenix FC of the Australian A-League Women and Brooklyn FC of the USL Super League.

== Early life and college career ==
Cox was born and raised in Greensboro, North Carolina, and attended Grimsley High School, where she played on the soccer and basketball teams. She played ECNL club soccer for North Carolina Fusion. She was named the News & Record girls' soccer player of the year in 2017 and 2018.

=== North Carolina Tar Heels ===
Cox played all 27 games (24 starts) in her freshman season with the North Carolina Tar Heels in 2019, featuring alongside Alessia Russo on the front line. She helped North Carolina win the ACC tournament, assisting twice in a 2–0 win against NC State in the semifinals. She scored twice in a 4–0 win against Michigan in the third round of the NCAA tournament as they reached the national championship game, which they lost to Stanford on penalties. She finished the 2019 season with 5 goals and 6 assists, earning Atlantic Coast Conference all-freshman recognition. In her sophomore season, which was disrupted by the COVID-19 pandemic in 2020, she started all 20 games and scored 4 goals with 4 assists. She scored 4 goals with 2 assists in 16 games (6 starts) in her junior season in 2021. In her senior season in 2022, she scored 2 goals and led North Carolina with 8 assists in 26 games (15 starts). She started every round of the NCAA tournament as they returned to the national title game, losing to UCLA. She made 21 appearances (1 start) in her graduate season in 2023. When she left North Carolina, she had made 110 appearances, the most in program history and third-most in NCAA Division I history.

== Club career ==
=== Wellington Phoenix ===
A-League Women club Wellington Phoenix FC announced Cox's signing on December 7, 2023, as an injury replacement for Grace Wisnewski. Cox scored her first goal for the club on January 7, 2024, opening against Brisbane Roar FC. She had another shot ricochet off a defender's arm, but no handball was called, as they lost 2–1. She scored 3 goals with 3 assists in 13 appearances (10 starts) as the Phoenix finished 8th of 12 teams in the 2023–24 season.

=== Brooklyn FC ===
USL Super League club Brooklyn FC announced on July 23, 2024, that they had signed Cox ahead of the league's inaugural 2024–25 season. She started and scored in the team's first-ever game, a 1–0 win against Tampa Bay Sun FC. She played in all 14 games (7 starts) in the fall series and scored 3 goals, helping Brooklyn top the standings at the season break.

Cox announced her retirement from professional soccer on January 22, 2025.

== Career statistics ==
=== Club ===
As of December 14, 2024

Club	Season	League			League Cup		Total	
Club	Season	Division	Apps	Goals	Apps	Goals	Apps	Goals
Wellington Phoenix FC	2023–24	A-League	13	3	–		13	3
Brooklyn FC	2024–25	USL Super League	14	3	–		14	3
Career total			27	6	0	0	27	6
