= Emily Yaple =

American soccer player (born 2002)

Personal information
- Full name: Emily Claire Yaple
- Date of birth: May 23, 2002 (age 24)
- Height: 5 ft 6 in (1.68 m)
- Positions: Winger; midfielder

Youth career
- Erie Admirals
- Beadling SC
- WNY Flash Academy

College career
Years	Team	Apps	(Gls)
2020–2022	Pittsburgh Panthers	55	(10)
2023	Florida Gators	12	(1)

Senior career*
Years	Team	Apps	(Gls)
2024	Carolina Ascent (USLW)	6	(0)
2024–2025	Brooklyn FC	20	(0)
2025–2026	SC Sand	16	(0)
- * Club domestic league appearances and goals as of 16:56, February 13, 2026 (UTC)

Emily Claire Yaple (born May 23, 2002) is an American professional soccer player who plays as a winger or midfielder. She played college soccer for the Pittsburgh Panthers and the Florida Gators.

== Early life ==
Yaple grew up in Erie, Pennsylvania, with her two parents and twin brother Hunter. She participated in gymnastics as a child as well as soccer, joining the Erie Admirals club team in elementary school. She then switched to Beadling SC and spent four years with the team. Finally, Yaple rounded out her youth career with the Western New York Flash Academy program, making the one hour and forty minute drive to Elma, New York three times a week.

Originally, Yaple attended Villa Maria Academy, where she was a three-year starter. In her senior year, she transferred to Fort LeBoeuf High School so she could graduate in December and start college early. The move was a successful one, as Yaple broke Fort LeBoeuf's goal record in her single season of play and was subsequently named to the 2019 High School All-American Watch List. She officially signed with the University of Pittsburgh in mid-November and made the move a month later.

== College career ==
Yaple played three seasons for the Pittsburgh Panthers. She started all 16 games of her freshman year, a number which would eventually become a career-high. She scored her first collegiate goal on September 17, 2020, netting the opener in a 2–0 victory over Syracuse. She went on to claim responsibility for two more assists and two more goals in her first season with Pitt. As a sophomore, Yaple started only 7 of the Panthers' 18 matches, but managed to tally 5 goals. She ended the season on a high note, scoring a bicycle kick goal against Boston College in the third-to-last game of the campaign. The goal, which helped power Pitt to a 3–0 win, was featured as SportsCenter's third-best play of the night. Yaple saw her playing time further decrease in her third season, as she started 5 games and played a total of 639 minutes. She finished her time at Pitt with 55 appearances and 10 goals.

Ahead of the 2023 college season, Yaple transferred to the University of Florida to pursue a master's degree. She made 12 appearances for the Gators, including 4 straight starts to open the season. She scored her lone goal with Florida on September 24, striking from 20 yards out to open the scoring in a 1–1 draw with Kentucky.

== Club career ==
After leaving college, Yaple spent time as a part of the Carolina Ascent's USL W League team before signing her first professional contract with Brooklyn FC on August 26, 2024. She made one goal contribution on the season: an assist to Mackenzie George in a December 7 match against Lexington SC. She made 20 appearances (10 starts) as Brooklyn finished 6th in USLS standings.

On July 16, 2025, Yaple signed with German second-division club SC Sand.

== Career statistics ==
=== Club ===
As of July 17, 2025

Appearances and goals by club, season and competition
Club	Season	League			Cup		Playoffs (Note: Includes USL Super League playoffs)		Total	
Club	Season	Division	Apps	Goals	Apps	Goals	Apps	Goals	Apps	Goals
Brooklyn FC	2024–25	USL Super League	20	0	—		—		20	0
SC Sand	2025–26	2. Frauen-Bundesliga	0	0	0	0	—		0	0
Career total			20	0	0	0	0	0	20	0
