= Samantha Kroeger =

American soccer player (born 2002)

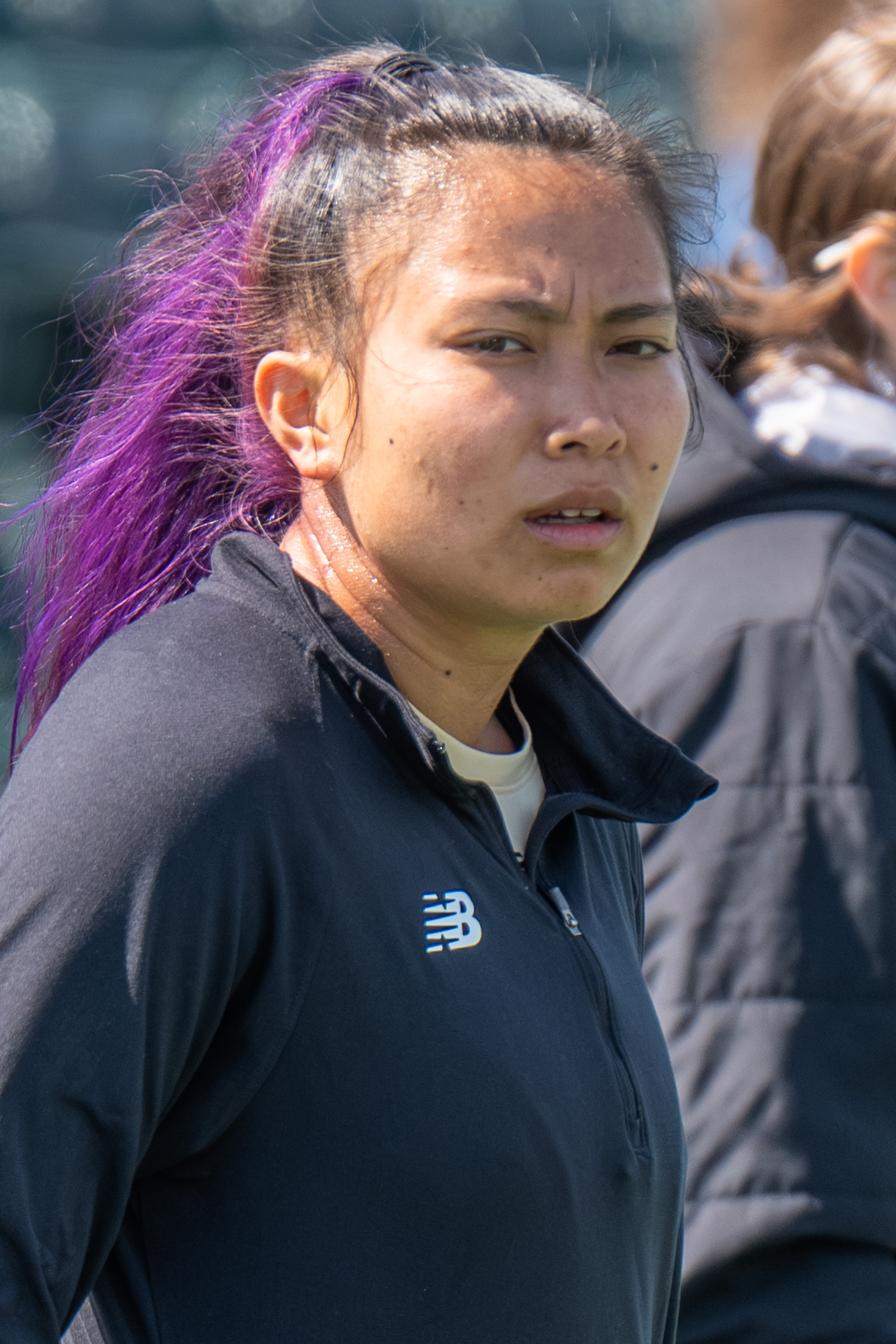
- Kroeger with Brooklyn FC in 2026

Personal information
- Full name: Samantha Cai-Lu Kroeger
- Date of birth: April 28, 2002 (age 24)
- Place of birth: West Milford, New Jersey
- Height: 5 ft 2 in (1.57 m)
- Position: Midfielder

Team information
- Current team: Tampa Bay Sun

College career
Years	Team	Apps	(Gls)
2019–2023	Rutgers Scarlet Knights	78	(15)

Senior career*
Years	Team	Apps	(Gls)
2023	Morris Elite SC	10	(4)
2024–2026	Brooklyn FC	56	(1)
2026–	Tampa Bay Sun	6	(0)
- * Club domestic league appearances and goals as of 00:38, November 7, 2026 (UTC)

Samantha Cai-Lu Kroeger (born April 28, 2002) is an American professional soccer player who plays as midfielder for USL Super League club Tampa Bay Sun. She played college soccer for the Rutgers Scarlet Knights before starting her professional career with Brooklyn FC.

== College career ==
Raised in West Milford, New Jersey, Kroeger played prep soccer at West Milford High School. Starting in 2019, she played her collegiate soccer career at Rutgers University.

In 2021, Kroeger was a key member of a dominant Rutgers team that went undefeated in Big Ten conference play, winning all ten of their conference matches. The team advanced to the finals of the Big Ten tournament, marking just the third finals appearance in Rutgers history, though they were defeated by Michigan. Rutgers also made it to the College Cup for the second time in its history, where they were eliminated by Florida State. In 2022, Kroeger and teammate Allison Lowrey both led the team in scoring with seven goals each.

Kroeger joined Morris Elite SC in the USL W League in 2023. During the season, she appeared in 11 matches and contributed to the team's victory in the Metropolitan Division. Morris Elite qualified for the playoffs, where Kroeger made one appearance.

== Club career ==
=== Brooklyn FC ===
Kroeger was not drafted in the 2024 NWSL Draft. Later that year on July 3, 2024, it was announced that Kroeger agreed to join Brooklyn FC for the inaugural USL Super League season. Kroeger made her professional debut on September 8, 2024, starting in Brooklyn FC's inaugural match against Spokane. On September 25, she was named Player of the Match for her performance in a game against Dallas. Kroeger scored her first professional goal on October 27 in a home match against Fort Lauderdale United FC.

In her second season in Brooklyn, Kroeger earned multiple USL Super League Team of the Month honors. She appeared in all 28 of her team's matches, the only player on Brooklyn to do so that year. She also registered seven assists, which tied the Super League's single-season record. On July 9, 2026, Brooklyn FC announced Kroeger's departure.

=== Tampa Bay Sun ===
On July 31, 2026, it was announced that Kroeger had signed with fellow USL Super League club Tampa Bay Sun.

== Career statistics ==
=== College summary ===
College team	Season	Regular season			Big Ten Tournament		NCAA Tournament		Total	
College team	Season	Conference	Apps	Goals	Apps	Goals	Apps	Goals	Apps	Goals
Rutgers Scarlet Knights	2020–21	Big 10	16	1	—		—		16	1
Rutgers Scarlet Knights	2021	Big 10	17	5	3	0	5	0	25	5
Rutgers Scarlet Knights	2022	Big 10	18	7	1	0	1	0	20	7
Rutgers Scarlet Knights	2023	Big 10	15	2	1	0	1	0	17	2
Total			66	15	5	0	7	0	78	15

=== Club summary ===
As of October 24, 2026

Club	Season	League			League Cup		Playoffs		Total	
Club	Season	Division	Apps	Goals	Apps	Goals	Apps	Goals	Apps	Goals
Morris Elite SC	2023	USL W League	10	4	—		1	0	11	4
Brooklyn FC	2024–25	USL Super League	28	1	—		0	0	28	1
Brooklyn FC	2025–26	USL Super League	28	0	—		0	0	28	0
Brooklyn FC	Total		56	1	0	0	0	0	56	1
Tampa Bay Sun FC	2026	USL Super League	6	0	—		0	0	6	0
Career total			72	5	0	0	1	0	73	5
