= Jessica Silva (Canadian soccer) =

Canadian soccer coach (born 1988)

Personal information
- Date of birth: April 11, 1988 (age 38)
- Place of birth: Montreal, Canada
- Height: 1.70 m (5 ft 7 in)
- Position: Forward

Youth career
- Years: Team
- CS Longueuil

Managerial career
- 2011–2018: McGill Martlets (assistant)
- 2018–2019: US Orléans (assistant)
- 2020–2023: Metz
- 2024–2025: Brooklyn FC

Jessica Silva (born 11 April 1988) is a Canadian soccer coach. She has previously served as the head coach of Division 2 Féminine club FC Metz and USL Super League club Brooklyn FC.

== Early life ==
Born in Montreal, Silva was raised in the nearby city of Longueuil. She started playing soccer for CS Longueuil and gained experience with both boys' and girls' teams. After a leg injury sustained at age 14 put Silva's playing career on pause, she began coaching her younger brother's team. By the time she turned 20, she had become Longueuil's assistant technical director. Silva attended McGill University, where she studied to become a Physical education teacher. She soon connected with the Martlets soccer program and rose through the coaching ranks at McGill in addition to through roles with CS Longueuil.

== Coaching career ==
At the age of 27, Silva was selected for a FIFA internship at the 2015 Women's World Cup in Canada. She grew inspired after sharing conversations with England head coach Hope Powell, who encouraged her to move to Europe and coach. In August 2016, Silva was hired by the Canada under-15 national team as a performance analyst. She went on to work for the Canadian Soccer Association for several years, serving on the coaching staff off the U15, U17, and U20 national teams. Silva also gained experience coaching at the provincial level. In 2017, she led Quebec to a Canada Games under-18 title and became first Québécoise coach to win the competition.

Silva moved to France in 2018 and would go on to spend seven years in the country. Upon arrival, she was hired at US Orléans to coach the club's under-19 squad. She later became Orléans' head of academy and a first-team assistant.

On 9 December 2019, Silva was hired as the technical director of FC Metz, which looked to move in a more positive direction after conceding 36 goals in 12 matches throughout the first half of the 2018–19 Division 2 Féminine season. The following year, Silva became Metz's head coach. Over three seasons, she guided the club through experiences in both the French Division 2 and top-flight, including during times further complicated by the COVID-19 pandemic. In her final campaign with Metz, the team narrowly missed out on promotion to the Division 1. Silva finished her tenure at Metz with the squad having registered 29 wins, 10 draws, and 14 losses under her leadership. She had become the first Canadian woman to have earned her UEFA A Licence while in France.

Brooklyn FC of the United States announced Silva to be the club's head coach in September 2024, ahead of the inaugural USL Super League season. Silva piloted Brooklyn to finish the first half of the season at the top of the standings. However, after the Super League returned to play after the winter break, Brooklyn went on a nine-match winless streak. Following a 5–0 defeat to the Carolina Ascent on 12 April 2025, Silva was fired.

== Personal life ==
Silva is of half-Portuguese and half-Italian descent. She graduated from McGill University with a Bachelor's degree in education and health.
