= Nova Southeastern Sharks women's soccer =

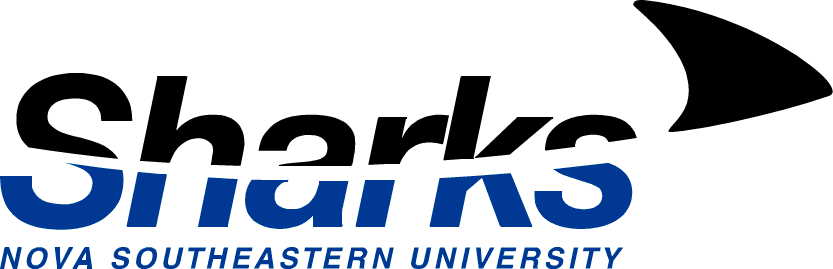
- Founded: 1995; 31 years ago
- University: Nova Southeastern University
- Head coach: Amy Vaughan
- Location: Davie, Florida
- Colors: Navy blue and gray
Home	Away

The NSU Sharks women's soccer team represents Nova Southeastern University in Davie, Florida. They currently compete in the Sunshine State Conference.

The team has won 7 conference titles (4 regular seasons and 3 tournaments), having also appeared in NCAA tournament 7 times.

== History ==
The first women's soccer team was fielded in 1995. Among the highlights of the 2004 campaign was the first-ever victory for an NSU team in a Sunshine State Conference Tournament game, as the Knights knocked off nationally ranked Lynn University 2–1 on the road in the SSC quarterfinals. NSU lost to eventual SSC Tournament Champion Tampa in the semifinals, but proved it can compete with the best in the conference.

The 2002 season saw the Sharks break a number of program records en route to a 13–5 record in the program’s first year playing in NCAA Division II. The Knights set school records for fewest losses, consecutive home wins (6), home wins in a season (8) and fewest goals allowed in a season (22). The Knights also received National Poll votes in the NCAA.

In 2019, NSU captured the NCAA South Region Championship after defeating Embry-Riddle 2–1.

== Season by season record ==
Year	Coach	Record
1995	Akram Molaka	9–9-1
1996	Rebecca Utter	9–8
1997	Rebecca Utter	10–10
1998	Rebecca Utter	12–10
1999	Mike Goodrich	10–9
2000	Mike Goodrich	16–6
2001	Mike Goodrich	3–15
2002	Mike Goodrich	13–5
2003	Mike Goodrich	11–7
2004	Mike Goodrich	7–8
2005	Mike Goodrich	6–7
2006	Mike Goodrich	13–4
2007	Mike Goodrich	15–2
2008	Mike Goodrich	11–5

== Titles ==
=== Conference ===
- Regular season (4): 1995, 1996, 2010, 2017
- Tournament (3): 1995, 1997, 1998
- South Region championship (1): 2019
