= Leah Scarpelli =

American soccer player (born 2001)

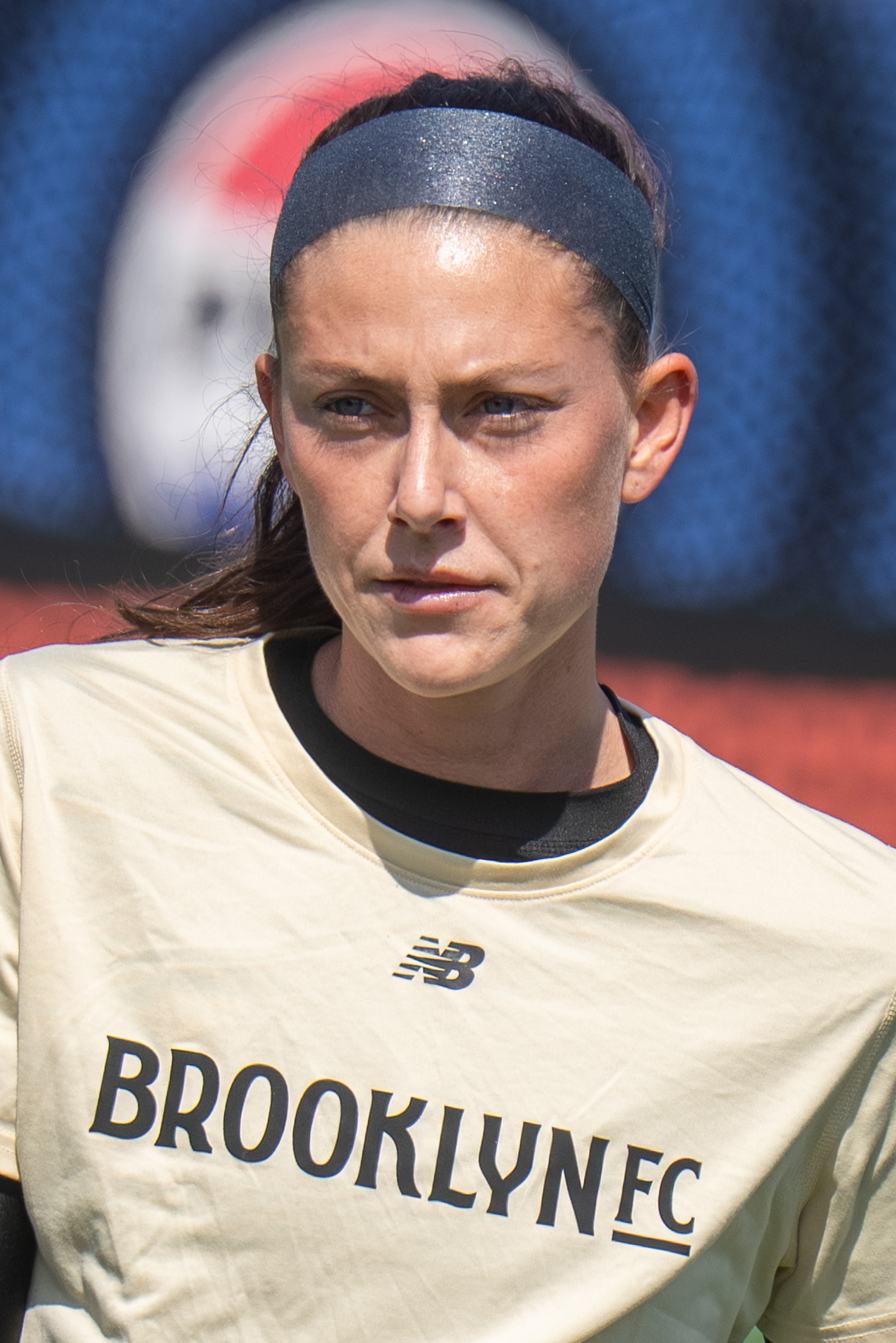
- Scarpelli with Brooklyn FC in 2026

Personal information
- Full name: Leah Elizabeth Scarpelli
- Date of birth: September 18, 2001 (age 25)
- Place of birth: Toms River, New Jersey
- Height: 5 ft 9 in (1.75 m)
- Positions: Left back; center back

Team information
- Current team: Tampa Bay Sun
- Number: 7

College career
Years	Team	Apps	(Gls)
2019	Penn State Nittany Lions	3	(0)
2020–2022	Florida Gulf Coast Eagles	44	(6)

Senior career*
Years	Team	Apps	(Gls)
2023	Sporting CP	1	(0)
2023–2024	Brisbane Roar	17	(0)
2024–2026	Brooklyn FC	49	(2)
2026–	Tampa Bay Sun	7	(0)

International career^{‡}
2015–2018	United States U17	5	(0)
- * Club domestic league appearances and goals as of 00:52, October 13, 2026 (UTC) ‡ National team caps and goals as of August 24, 2024

Leah Elizabeth Scarpelli (born September 18, 2001), nicknamed "Scarps", is an American professional soccer player who plays as a left back for USL Super League club Tampa Bay Sun. She previously played for USL Super League club Brooklyn FC, which she captained, after stints with Sporting CP and Brisbane Roar. She played college soccer for the Penn State Nittany Lions and Florida Gulf Coast Eagles.

== Early life ==
Scarpelli is a native of Brick Township, New Jersey. She started playing soccer at the age of four in the Brick, NJ travelling soccer program and played high school soccer at Brick Memorial High School in her sophomore year. High school honors included: Offensive Player MVP, First Team All A South Jersey, All-State Third Team.

Scarpelli played soccer at several travelling club teams throughout her youth/high school including: NJSA (boys' team), International Girls Futbol Academy, Match Fit Academy, Player Development Academy (PDA) and Cedar Stars Academy.

Scarpelli was on the state, regional and national youth soccer Olympic Development Program (ODP) teams. It was at the national ODP training camp in Florida where she was seen by the U.S. scouts and soon thereafter, Scarpelli attended her first US Youth National U-15 training camp at the age of 13 in Carson, CA in March 2015. Leah went on to be invited to 12 additional US Youth National training camps.

== College career ==
=== Penn State Nittany Lions ===
Scarpelli was part of Penn State's top-ranked recruiting class of 2019 playing D1 college soccer at Pennsylvania State University and in her sophomore year, transferred to Florida Gulf Coast University. At Penn State, her team won the Big Ten Conference Championship in the Fall of 2019. At FGCU her team won the ASUN Conference Championship in the Fall of 2022.

Scarpelli played in the WPSL - Cape Coral in Florida during summer college break and received the 2021 All-Conference Team WPSL - Sunshine South Conference honor.

=== Florida Gulf Coast Eagles ===
At Florida Gulf Coast University, Scarpelli earned several honors including: 2023 Ken Kavanagh FGCU Eagle Scholar-Athlete Finalist, ASUN Defensive Player of the Year, NCAA United Coaches Women's Scholar All-American - 2nd Team, College Sports News All-American - Third Team, NCAA United Coaches - All South Scholar, ASUN Conference All-Tournament Team, ASUN First Team of the Year, Top Drawer Soccer's National Team of the Week, College Sports Communicators Academic All-District. 2022 ASUN Conference Champions. In September 2022 in the FGCU game vs. Queens College, Scarpelli scored from 45-yards out to earn the Number One spot on the ESPN Sports Center Top Ten featured morning program. Leah was selected as Top Drawer Soccer Team of the Week in September of 2022.

Scarpelli graduated Summa Cum Laude in December 2022.

== Club career ==
=== Sporting CP ===
After college graduation, Scarpelli signed with the women's professional Portuguese team Sporting Clube de Portugal on January 27, 2023.

=== Brisbane Roar ===
On August 28, 2023, Scarpelli joined Brisbane Roar FC of the A-League. While at Brisbane Roar, Leah played 1524 minutes and had one assist.

=== Brooklyn FC ===
Scarpelli joined Brooklyn FC on June 28, 2024, ahead of the inaugural USL Super League season. She was the third player to sign. Scarpelli made her club debut in Brooklyn's inaugural match against Spokane on September 8, 2024. The back of her jersey reads "Scarps" instead of her surname, Scarpelli. 2025/2026 season Scarpelli made captain. In February of 2026, Leah was selected as one of nine brand ambassadors of the Gainbridge Super League. Leah scored two goals and three assists for the 2025-2026 season and played 1586 minutes. October of 2025, Leah was on the Gainbridge Super League Team of the Month in a Bench spot and nominated for the Goal of the Month (Olympico).

=== Tampa Bay Sun ===
On July 6, 2026, it was announced that Scarpelli had joined fellow USL Super League Tampa Bay Sun.

== International career ==
Scarpelli was called up to several United States National Youth Soccer teams (U15, U16 and U17) training camps held in Oregon, California, Florida, Netherlands and Italy. In August 2016, she was rostered on the U15 Girls CONCACAF team where her team won the 2016 CONCACAF Girls' U-15 Championship. Scarpelli was selected on the Best XI team (center back). While with the United States national under-17 team in April 2017, Scarpelli played as a defender in the US U17 Torneo Women's Delle Nazioni International Tournament in Italy where her team won the championship.

== Style of play ==
Scarpelli has been described: "brings versatility... having grown up playing central midfield and left midfield before eventually falling into a strong center back role". She plays professionally as a defender.

== Personal life ==
Scarpelli is the daughter of American professional soccer goalkeeper Craig Scarpelli, who was on the U.S. U-20 Men's National Team in 1980. He was a goalkeeper for University of Tampa and played on the semi-pro team of Georgia Generals and professional teams: St. Louis Steamers and Ft. Lauderdale/Minnesota Strikers.
