= Ferdinando De Matthaeis =

Italian footballer

Personal information
- Full name: Ferdinando De Matthaeis
- Date of birth: May 29, 1961 (age 65)
- Place of birth: Alberona, Italy
- Height: 5 ft 10 in (1.78 m)
- Position: Midfielder

Senior career*
Years	Team	Apps	(Gls)
1979–1980	Lucera		
1981–1984	New York Cosmos (indoor)	37	(17)
1982–1984	New York Cosmos	1	(0)
1986	Brooklyn Italians		
1987–1988	US Ragusa		
1989	New Jersey Eagles (ASL)	20	(1)
1990	Boston Bolts (APSL)	18	(0)
1991–1992	New Jersey Arrows		
1993–1994	New Jersey Stallions		

Managerial career
- IMG Academy
- 2014: Miami United
- 2015–2016: Miami Fusion
- 2016–2017: NJ Ceder Stars
- 2017: Miami Fusion
- 2019–2021: Miami United
- * Club domestic league appearances and goals

Ferdinando De Matthaeis (born May 29, 1961) is a retired professional Italian footballer who played for the New York Cosmos. He formerly served as head coach of Miami United FC in the National Premier Soccer League.

== Playing career ==
De Matthaeis spent the majority of his fifteen-year professional career with the New York Cosmos, with brief periods in Italy. He was invited to a National team training camp towards the end of his career. During his time with the Cosmos, he had the privilege of playing alongside legends such as Carlos Alberto, Franz Beckenbauer, and Giorgio Chinaglia. He appeared 38 times over 4 years for the New York Cosmos from 1981 to 1984. During his career with the Cosmos he scored 17 times and assisted on 12 goals in both indoor and outdoor competitions.

== Coaching career ==
De Matthaeis coached at IMG Academy in Sarasota, Florida for a number of years, where he developed young athletes in preparation for the next level. In 2014 De Matthaeis moved to Miami, Florida where he became head coach of Miami United FC (NPSL). During his only year in charge he posted a record of 7–3–0 and won the NPSL Sunshine Conference. He became the only Miami United FC head coach to go undefeated during the regular season. In 2015 with the help of another ownership group he founded the Miami Fusion FC of the NPSL. He would coach them in their first season of play to a NPSL Sunshine Conference championship over his former team Miami United FC. With this win he would secure a place for the Miami Fusion FC in the 2016 US Open Cup in their first season.
