= Kelsey Hill =

American soccer player (born 1999)

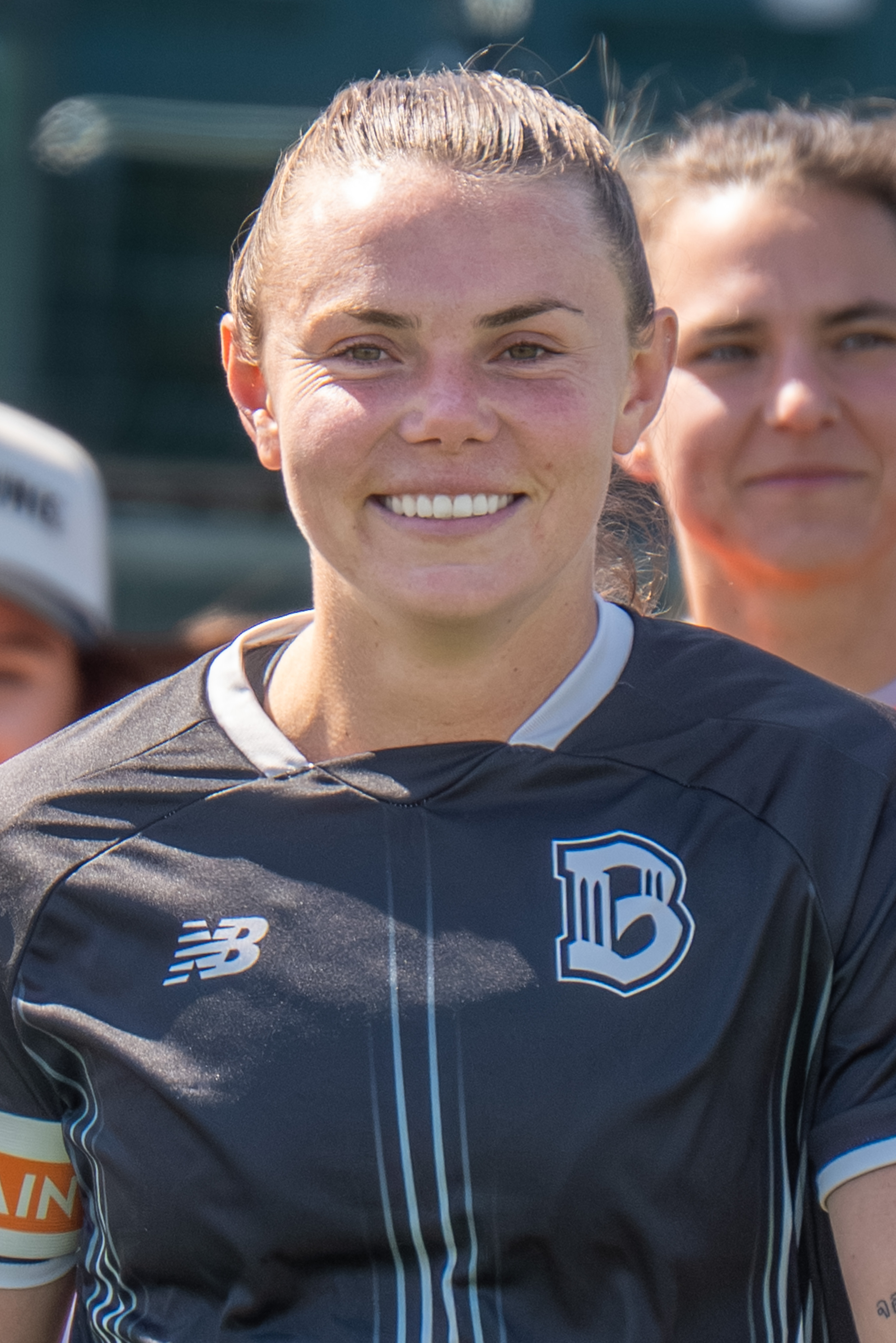
- Hill with Brooklyn FC in 2026

Personal information
- Full name: Kelsey Taylor Hill
- Date of birth: November 8, 1999 (age 26)
- Place of birth: Utah, USA
- Height: 5 ft 7 in (1.70 m)
- Position: Defender

Team information
- Current team: Tampa Bay Sun
- Number: 11

Youth career
- San Juan SC
- Davis Legacy
- Manteca
- Everton
- 2013–2017: Cosumnes Oaks Wolfpack

College career
Years	Team	Apps	(Gls)
2017–2018	Saint Mary's Gaels	38	(3)
2019–2022	Pepperdine Waves	40	(4)

Senior career*
Years	Team	Apps	(Gls)
2023	Angel City FC	0	(0)
2023–2024	Odense Boldklub Q	10	(1)
2024–2026	Brooklyn FC	52	(2)
2026–	Tampa Bay Sun	9	(0)
- * Club domestic league appearances and goals as of 00:48, November 7, 2026 (UTC)

Kelsey Taylor Hill (born November 8, 1999) is an American professional soccer player who plays as a defender for USL Super League club Tampa Bay Sun FC. She played college soccer for the Saint Mary's Gaels and Pepperdine Waves. She has previously played for Angel City FC of the National Women's Soccer League, Odense Boldklub Q of the Kvindeligaen, and Brooklyn FC of the USLS.

== Early life ==
Hill was born in Utah. She was raised in Elk Grove, California, and began playing soccer at the age of four, inspired by the United States women's national soccer team and players such as Mia Hamm.

== College career ==
=== Saint Mary’s Gaels ===
Hill began her collegiate soccer career at Saint Mary’s College of California, where she started all 38 matches over the 2017 and 2018 seasons. She scored one goal as a freshman and two as a sophomore, earning selection to the West Coast Conference (WCC) All-Freshman Team in 2017.

=== Pepperdine Waves ===
In January 2019, Hill transferred to Pepperdine University, enrolling mid-season and red-shirting the 2019 campaign per NCAA transfer regulations. During her time with the Waves, she appeared in 40 matches and became a key member of the team’s defense. In the 2021 season, Hill started all 22 games as part of a defensive unit that recorded 13 shutouts—one short of the school record—and achieved the best goals-against average in the WCC. She ranked third on the team in minutes played with 1,934 and earned a WCC Defensive Player of the Week award in October 2021.

During her senior preseason, Hill suffered a hip injury that caused her to miss her final collegiate season. Despite the setback, she remained committed to pursuing a professional career.

== Club career ==
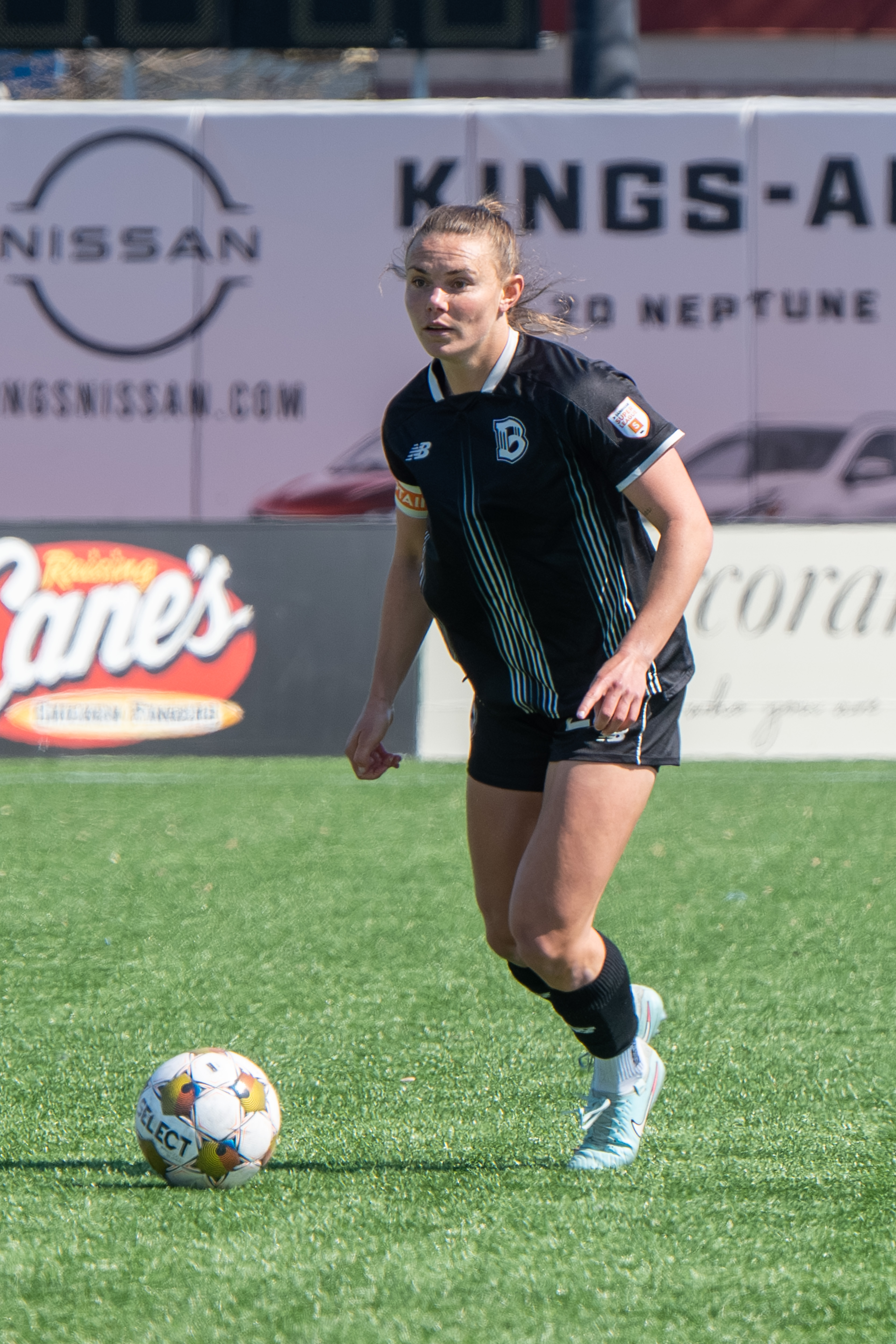
Hill with Brooklyn FC in 2026

=== Angel City FC ===
In 2023, Hill joined Angel City FC of the National Women's Soccer League (NWSL) as a National Team Replacement player ahead of the 2023 FIFA Women's World Cup.

=== Odense Boldklub Q ===
In January 2024, Hill signed with Danish club Odense Boldklub Q of Gjensidige Kvindeligaen (now A-Liga). In July of that year, she was transferred to Brooklyn FC in the most expensive transfer in Kvindeligaen history.

=== Brooklyn FC ===
On August 13, 2024, Brooklyn FC announced the signing of Hill as part of its inaugural women’s squad for the 2024–25 USL Super League season. In her debut season with Brooklyn FC during the 2024–25 campaign, Hill was named team captain and was a regular starter, making 26 appearances for the club. She earned league recognition in February 2025 when she was named to the USL Super League Team of the Month for her defensive performances.

In September 2025, she was again selected to the Team of the Month after ranking fourth in the league for completed passes (297), eighth in clearances (25), and tied for fifteenth in shots (7); she also scored her first professional goal in a 2–2 draw against DC Power FC.

=== Tampa Bay Sun ===
On July 6, 2026, fellow USL Super League club Tampa Bay Sun FC announced the signing of Hill.

== Personal life ==
Hill’s journey to professional soccer involved overcoming a broken hip in college, going undrafted, reaching out and training with coaches in the NWSL, including a six-month period training with Angel City FC before being signed.

== Honors ==
Individual

- West Coast Conference All-Freshman Team: 2017
- USL Super League Team of the Month: February 2025, September 2025
