= Miami Fusion FC (2015–2017) =

Miami Fusion
- Full name: Miami Fusion Football Club
- Founded: 2013; 13 years ago
- Dissolved: 2018
- Ground: Ives Estates Park
- Capacity: 1,000
- League: National Premier Soccer League
- Website: www.miamifusion.com
Home colours	Away colours

The Miami Fusion FC was a soccer team based in Miami, Florida. They competed in the National Premier Soccer League (NPSL) Sunshine Conference. They were founded in 2013 and named after the former Major League Soccer team, Miami Fusion.

== History ==
Miami Fusion FC was founded in 2013 by InteliSport, alongside Ferdinando De Matthaeis, as an expansion team in the National Premier Soccer League. The club played their first season in 2015.

=== 2015 NPSL season ===
In the first competitive season, the Fusion were coached by Ferdinando De Matthaeis. They finished the season as the Sunshine Conference Champions with a record of 8–1–1 and a total of 25 points. In the regional semifinal round of the NPSL, the Fusion faced Chattanooga FC but fell short losing 1–0 ending the season. Winning the 2015 conference championship would qualify them to represent the NPSL Sunshine Conference in the 2016 US Open Cup.

=== 2016 NPSL season ===
In 2016, Giuseppe DePalo was announced as the second coach in club history following his time in charge of the men's program at Nova Southeastern University. DePalo came to the Fusion with years of experience as a player as well, playing with the Connecticut Wolves in the A-League and the US Open Cup. De Matthaeis also hired Keith Ehrhart as club operations director before the 2016 season after serving as an intern for the front office. The Fusion finished in third place of the NPSL Sunshine Conference with a record of 5–2–3 and 18 points.

==== 2016 US Open Cup ====
The Fusion qualified for the 2016 US Open Cup after winning the Sunshine conference in the first year of league play. In the first round they were matched up against local rivals Boca Raton FC and the game was held a Broward College soccer stadium. The Fusion came out on top after extra time, which advanced them to the next round of the tournament. In the next round, the Fusion traveled to Wilmington, North Carolina, to face the Wilmington Hammerheads FC of the United Soccer League. The game was held at Legion Stadium with the Fusion falling to the home team after 90 minutes of play, thus ending their US Open Cup run.

2017 NPSL season

The Fusion saw the return of Ferdinado De Matthaeis as head coach for the 2017 season.

== Season records ==
Year	Division	League	Regular season	Season Record	NPSL Playoffs	US Open Cup
2015	4th	NPSL	1st	8–1–1	Southern Region	
2016	4th	NPSL	3rd	5–2–3	Did not qualify	2nd Round
2017	4th	NPSL	1st	11-0-2	Southern Region	Qualified 2018

== Head coaches ==
Year	Name	Record
2015	Ferdinando De Matthaeis	8–1–1
2016	Giuseppe DePalo	6–2–3 (includes US Open Cup matches )
2017	Ferdinando De Matthaeis	11-2-0

== Stadiums ==
Year	Name
2015	FIU North Stadium
2016	Ives Estate Orange Bowl
2017	Ives Estate Orange Bowl
