= Samantha Rosette =

American soccer player (born 1998)

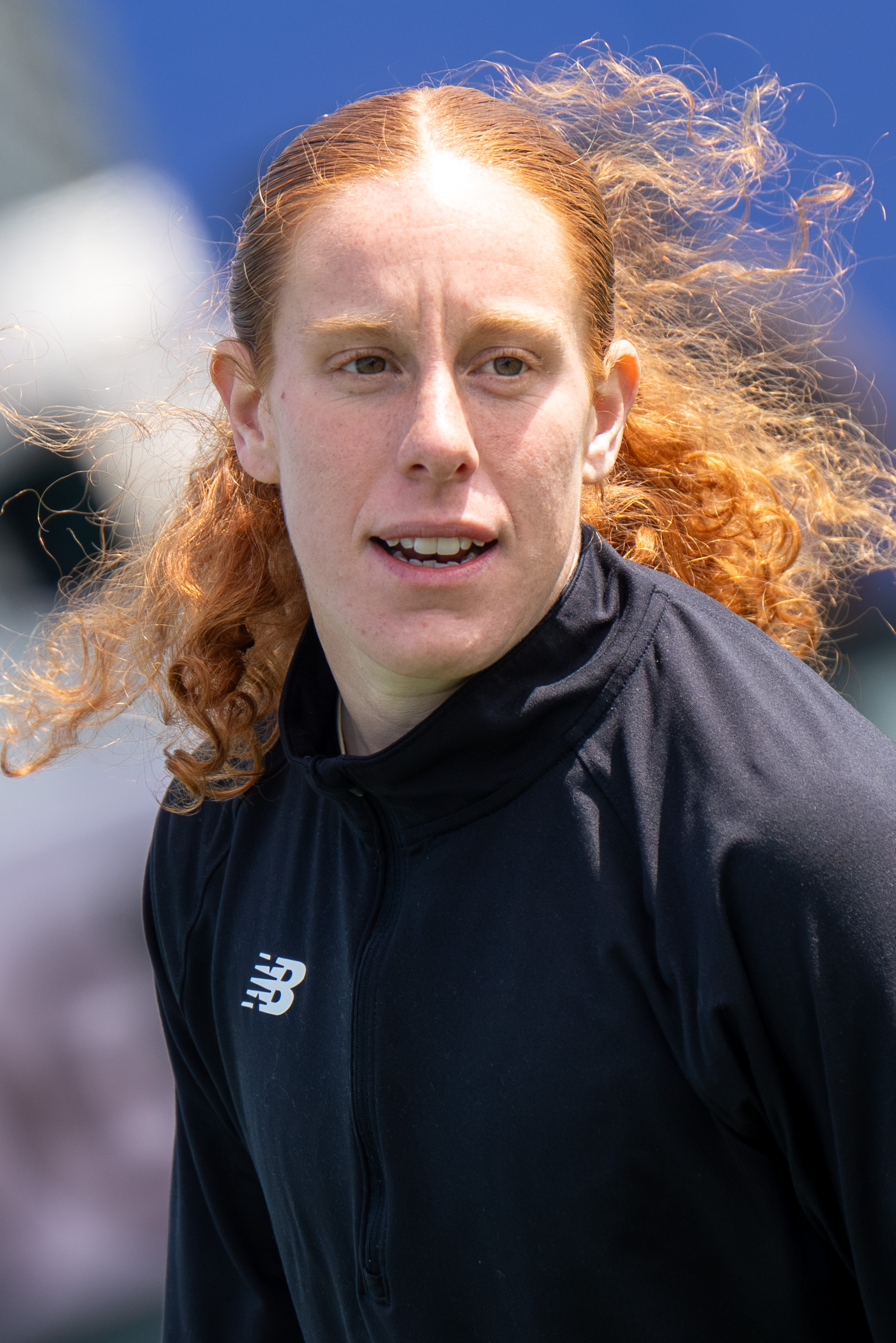
- Rosette with Brooklyn FC in 2026

Personal information
- Full name: Samantha Lee Johnson Rosette
- Date of birth: January 15, 1998 (age 28)
- Place of birth: The Bronx, New York, United States
- Height: 5 ft 6 in (1.68 m)
- Position: Defender

Youth career
- New Jersey Stallions

College career
Years	Team	Apps	(Gls)
2016–2018	Virginia Cavaliers	22	(1)
2019–2021	Villanova Wildcats	35	(6)

Senior career*
Years	Team	Apps	(Gls)
2021	NJ/NY Gotham Reserves	5	(–)
2021–2022	BIIK Kazygurt	0	(0)
2022–2023	FC Gintra	–	(–)
2023–2024	Strasbourg	–	(–)
2024–2026	Brooklyn FC	28	(1)
- * Club domestic league appearances and goals

Samantha Lee Johnson Rosette (born January 15, 1998) is an American former professional soccer player who played as a defender. She played college soccer for the Virginia Cavaliers and Villanova Wildcats before starting her professional career abroad with Kazakhstani club BIIK Kazygurt, Lithuanian club FC Gintra, and French club RC Strasbourg Alsace. She finished her career with USL Super League club Brooklyn FC, serving one season as team captain.

== Early life ==
Rosette was born in raised in The Bronx neighborhood of New York City. She played youth soccer for the New Jersey Stallions, where she was part of two National Premier League Champion-winning squads. In four separate years, she was the highest goalscorer on her team. Rosette attended Riverdale Kingsbridge Academy, where she ran track and played four years of varsity soccer. She was a prolific scorer for RKA and received one conference Player of the Year honor. As a senior, she was the top goalscorer in the state of New York, recording 53 goals and 17 assists. Her offensive talents helped lead her school to an unbeaten season in a quest for a city championship, but RKA was upset by Baruch College Campus High School in the final.

== College career ==
=== Virginia Cavaliers ===
Rosette verbally committed to the University of Virginia in her sophomore year of high school. She played in one game for the Cavaliers as a freshman, but an injury forced her to miss the remainder of the season. Over the next two years, Rosette was never quite able to cement herself as a starter, playing no more than 36 minutes in any of her 21 matches. She scored one goal for the Cavaliers, a header against Syracuse on October 19, 2018.

=== Villanova Wildcats ===
Ahead of the 2019 season, Rosette transferred to Villanova University. In her first year with the Wildcats, she made 20 appearances (17 starts), scored 4 goals, and made 3 assists. She helped Villanova reach the semifinals of the Big East Tournament, where they were eliminated by Xavier. In her fifth season of college, Rosette was named one of three Villanova team captains. She scored twice across 15 games to round out her collegiate career.

== Club career ==
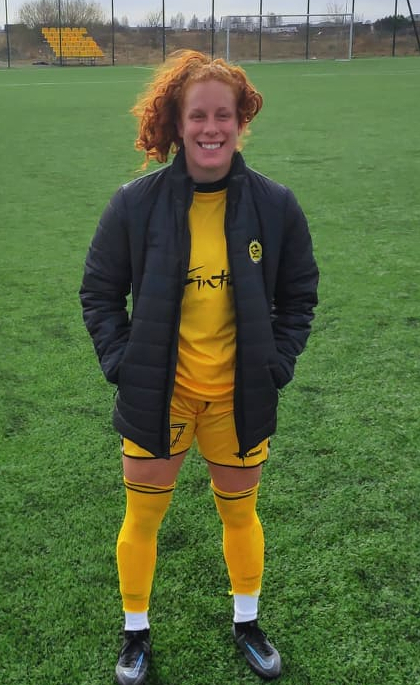
Rosette with BIIK Kazygurt in 2022

After leaving college, Rosette entered her name into the 2021 NWSL Draft, but she was not selected by any team. She went on to play one season for NJ/NY Gotham FC's reserve team in the pre-professional Women's Premier Soccer League. Since then, she has also taken opportunities to train with Gotham FC's professional squad in the NWSL.

Later on in 2021, Rosette moved over 6000 miles away to sign her first professional contract, a deal with Kazakhstani champions BIIK Kazygurt. She gained experience in the UEFA Women's Champions League, playing in exclusively UWCL matches during her one season in Kazakhstan.

In 2022, Rosette joined Lithuanian club FC Gintra, another regular in the Champions League. She got off to a quick start with Gintra, scoring a goal in each of her first three matches for the club. Her performances in the first round of the league were particularly inspiring, with the Lithuanian Women's A League identifying Rosette as the best player of the round. Rosette's efforts throughout the 2022–23 season helped Gintra clinch yet another championship title.

Following her nine months at FC Gintra, Rosette joined French second-division side RC Strasbourg Alsace on July 26, 2023. She helped Strasbourg gain promotion to the Première Ligue, but departed before Strasbourg's first season in the top-flight began.

In July 2024, Rosette moved back to her home state of New York, signing for USL Super League club Brooklyn FC ahead of the league's inaugural season. She was named as Brooklyn FC's first-ever club captain. In her first year with the team, Rosette played over 700 minutes as Brooklyn finished sixth place in the Super League standings. In October 2025, she scored her first USLS goal, chipping opposing goalkeeper Kaitlyn Parks in a 3–3 draw with Sporting Club Jacksonville. On April 23, 2026, Rosette announced her retirement from professional soccer at the conclusion of the 2025–26 season.

== Personal life ==
Rosette has spent her offseasons working as a coach for her hometown youth club Downtown United SC.

Alongside Gabriella Cuevas and Brianne Reed, Rosette founded The Players Network, an organization aiming to "grow the game by providing resources and support to players at all levels."
