= Miami United FC =

- Full name: Miami United Football Club
- Founded: 2012; 14 years ago
- Stadium: Ted Hendricks Stadium
- Capacity: 5,221
- CEO & Founder: Roberto Sacca
- Head coach: Claudio Frean
- League: United Premier Soccer League
- Website: www.miamiunitedsoccer.com
| Home colors | Away colors |

Miami United Football Club is an association football team based in Miami, Florida, United States. Founded in late 2012, the team made its debut in the Sunshine Conference of the National Premier Soccer League (NPSL) in 2013. The team currently competes in the United Premier Soccer League and plays their home games at Ted Hendrick Stadium, located in Hialeah, Florida.

== History ==
=== 2013 ===
Miami United played and won their first ever game in club history vs Cape Coral Hurricanes, 3–0, May 4, 2013. Miami finished the season in 3rd place in the NPSL Sunshine Conference.

2013 brought with it the creation of the youth and women's teams, along with new head coach Ferdinando De Matthaeis. Miami United FC also struck up a partnership with nearby Miami Dade College in a joint effort to develop youth soccer in Miami.

=== 2014 ===
In 2014 Miami United's official jersey and equipment supplier changed. No longer was the team's jersey and equipment supplied by Admiral, but instead by the Italian sports apparel company Garman. Italian watch and jewelry maker Gaga Milano also became the team's jersey sponsor. Miami remained heavily engaged in the community forging successful 2nd, youth and women's teams. Miami's 1st team also improved on the field by creating a club that had a mixture of veteran players and younger local players. The club finished the regular season undefeated on top of Sunshine Conference. Miami defeated both Storm FC and Tampa Marauders to claim the 2014 Sunshine Conference title. Miami then went on to face Chattanooga FC in the NPSL Southern Regional Finals, but was defeated. Despite losing to Chattanooga, because Miami won the Sunshine Conference the club still qualified for a slot in the Lamar Hunt U.S. Open Cup the following year.

After the NPSL post season, Miami United competed in an international friendly with Italian clubs Calcio Catania, Brescia Calcio and Novara Calcio. Miami won two of the three games.

=== 2015 ===
In January, Miami United played the most important game in their short history, vs San Lorenzo de Almagro, the last champion of "Copa Libertadores" (the top continental club trophy in South America).

In the Spring of 2015, Miami United FC became partners with the Portuguese club C.S. Marítimo and Japanese club FC Osaka.

=== 2016 ===
In January 2016, Miami United signed former Brazil international Adriano and Honduran international Julio César de León a.k.a. "Rambo" De Leon.

Miami United were crowned Champions of the Sunshine Conference. The club went on to defeat Atlanta Silverbacks in the Southern Semi-Regional Finals. After defeating Atlanta, Miami United traveled north to Tennessee to face Chattanooga FC in the NPSL Southern Regional Finals yet again. Despite losing to Chattanooga in a PK shootout, because Miami won the Sunshine Conference the club still qualified for a slot in the 2017 Lamar Hunt U.S. Open Cup.

=== 2017 ===
In August 2017, Miami United were announced as one of 8 applicant teams to join the National Independent Soccer Association, subject to United States Soccer Federation approval.

=== 2018 ===
Miami United reached the fourth round of the 2018 U.S. Open Cup with a 2–0 over fellow Floridian side Jacksonville Armada, setting up a fourth-round tie with Major League Soccer side Orlando City SC.

== Name and club identity ==
Due to the ever evolving diversity of Miami and the rest of South Florida in general, the name United was chosen as a means of unifying the many different peoples that make up the city, hence one of the club's mottos "Bringing the community together for the LOVE of the game." Unlike other clubs that use the title "United" as an indicator of the amalgamation of two or more clubs to form the one, as in the case of the well known English side Newcastle United, the use of the title "United" serves more as a celebratory and honorary salute to the multiple histories, legacies, players and fans of the four previous clubs that have represented the city over the years, i.e. Miami Gatos, Miami Toros, Miami Fusion, and lastly Miami FC. While Miami United F.C. has no official affiliation, nor claims to have any affiliation with any of the previous teams, the commitment to honor and celebrate the city's soccer past and cultural diversity remains a key part of the club's identity.

== Kits ==
| Period | Clothing sponsor | Shirt sponsor |
|---|---|---|
| 2012–2013 | Admiral | Admiral |
| 2013–2016 | Garman | GaGa Milano |
| 2017– 2023 | Skyros Sports | City of Hialeah |
| 2023 – | Hummel | Zativa Life |

== Year-by-year ==
| Year | Division | League | Regular season | Season Record | Playoffs | US Open Cup |
|---|---|---|---|---|---|---|
| 2013 | 4 | NPSL | 3rd, Sunshine | 3–2–3 | did not qualify | did not qualify |
| 2014 | 4 | NPSL | 1st, Sunshine | 7–3–0 | Southern Regional | did not qualify |
| 2015 | 4 | NPSL | 2nd, Sunshine | 6–0–4 | did not qualify | 2nd round |
| 2016 | 4 | NPSL | 1st, Sunshine | 9–0–1 | Southern Regional Final | did not qualify |
| 2017 | 4 | NPSL | 2nd, Sunshine | 7–4–1 | did not qualify | 2nd round |
| 2018 | 4 | NPSL | 3rd, Sunshine | 6–1–5 | Conference Final | 4th round |
| 2019 | 4 | NPSL | 3rd, Sunshine | 7–3–0 | Conference Final | did not qualify |
| 2020 | 4 | NPSL | N/A | 0-0-0 | N/A | N/A |
| 2021 | 4 | NPSL | 1st, Sunshine | 7–2–1 | Conference Final | COVID |
| 2022 | 4 | NPSL | 2nd, Sunshine | 7–0–3 | Conference Semifinals | 2nd Round |
| 2023 | – | – | – | – | – | 1st Round |
| 2024 | 4 | UPSL | 1st, Florida South | 9–3–1 | N/A | 3rd Round |
| Spring 2025 | 4 | UPSL | 1st, Florida South | 10–1–2 | Quarterfinals | 1st Round |
| Fall 2025 | 4 | UPSL | 1st, Florida South Zone I | 8–1–1 | Third Place Match | 4th Qualifying round |

== Honors ==
- Sunshine Conference Champion: 2014, 2016
- Everglades Cup Champion: 2013, 2014

== Stadium ==
Miami United play their home matches at Ted Hendricks Stadium, located in Milander Park in Hialeah, Florida.

== Coaching staff ==
=== Current coaching staff ===
| Role | Name |
|---|---|
| Head coach | (Argentina) Claudio Frean |
| Assistant coach | (Venezuela) Jose Andres Barrio |
| Goalkeeper Coach | (Peru) Javier Soriano |

=== Head coaches ===
| Name | Nation | Tenure |
|---|---|---|
| Ricardo Alcerro | Honduras | 2012–13 |
| Ferdinando De Matthaeis | Italy | 2014 |
| Sérgio Manoel | Brazil | 2015 |
| Ricardo Páez | Venezuela | 2016 |
| Stefano Agresti | Italy | 2017 |
| Gerardo Reinoso | Argentina | 2018 |
| Ferdinando De Matthaeis | Italy | 2019–2021 |
| Cláudio Frean | Argentina | 2023- |
