= Morris Elite SC =

American soccer team

- Full name: Morris Elite Soccer Club
- Founded: 2016
- Stadium: Rutgers University–Newark; Fredrick Douglass Field; Newark, New Jersey
- Owner: Vincenzo Bernardo
- President: Vincenzo Bernardo
- Head Coach: Dylan Evande
- League: USL League Two
- 2024: 8th, Metropolitan Division; Playoffs: DNQ
- Website: morriselitesoccer.com
Home colors	Away colors

Morris Elite Soccer Club is an American soccer club based in Madison, New Jersey that competes in the Metropolitan Division of USL League Two. They will begin play in the 2021 USL League Two season.

The club was founded in 2016 by former professional player Vincenzo Bernardo. They will also run teams in the USL Academy League.

== Year-by-year ==
=== Men's team ===
Year	Level	League	Reg. season	Playoffs	U.S. Open Cup
2021	4	USL League Two	8th, Metropolitan	did not qualify	did not qualify
2022	4	USL League Two	9th, Metropolitan	did not qualify	did not qualify
2023	4	USL League Two	8th, Metropolitan	did not qualify	did not qualify
2024	4	USL League Two	8th, Metropolitan	did not qualify	did not qualify
2025	4	USL League Two	4th, Metropolitan	did not qualify	did not qualify
2026	4	USL League Two	9th, Metropolitan	did not qualify	did not qualify

=== Women's team ===
Year	Level	League	Reg. season	Playoffs
2022	4	USL W League	1st, Metropolitan	Quarterfinals
2023	4	USL W League	1st, Metropolitan	Conference Finals
2024	4	USL W League	2nd, Metropolitan	did not qualify
2025	4	USL W League	3rd, Metropolitan	did not qualify
2026	4	USL W League	2nd, Metropolitan	did not qualify
