= Giuseppe DePalo =

Italian footballer

Personal information
- Full name: Giuseppe DePalo
- Date of birth: October 17, 1971 (age 55)
- Place of birth: Cesano Boscone, Italia
- Height: 5 ft 7 in (1.70 m)
- Position: Midfielder

College career
Years	Team	Apps	(Gls)
1993–1995	Franklin Pierce Ravens		

Senior career*
Years	Team	Apps	(Gls)
1995	Connecticut Wolves	17	(2)
1995	Tampa Bay Terror (indoor)	2	(0)
1995	Canton Invaders (indoor)	15	(0)
1996	Connecticut Wolves	10	(0)
1996	New Hampshire Phantoms	23	(2)
1997	Daytona Tigers	28	(8)

Managerial career
- 1997–1998: Embry Riddle University (Assistant)
- 1998–2015: Nova Southeastern University
- 2016–2017: Miami Fusion FC
- 2018: Miami FC ( Assistant )
- 2019: Seattle Sounders Academy (Assistant)
- 2020: Oakland Roots Reserves (Project 51O)
- 2021 – Pres.: Inter Miami CF U19 Head Coach
- * Club domestic league appearances and goals

Giuseppe DePalo (born Oct 17, 1971) is an Italian retired footballer who currently serves as U19 Head coach for Inter Miami CF.

He played for the Connecticut Wolves of the USD3 Pro League for two seasons in 1995 & 1996 as well as Daytona in 1997. He has also served as head coach of the Miami Fusion FC NPSL in 2016 during the club's participation in the US Open Cup, where he led the team to the 2nd round. Additionally, he has been Head Coach of the Ft Lauderdale Strikers U20s and was assistant coach of Miami FC during the club's NPSL National Championship in 2018. In 2017/18 he coached Kendall Academy in the US Development Academy. In February 2019 he joined the Seattle Sounders Academy as Head of Recruitment where he was the lead scout for the club's Academy and USL side. In 2020 he served as general manager for Oakland Roots SC and was head coach of their reserve team Project 51O.

== Early life ==
Giuseppe was born in Milan, Italy. His youth career was spent in Connecticut and later (1993–1995) at Franklin Pierce College.

== Player ==
His professional career began in 1995 when he signed on a free transfer with the Connecticut Wolves and manager Leszek Wrona. He appeared in over 40 matches with the Wolves over two seasons, including competing in the US Open Cup in 1995. On his debut against the New Hampshire Ramblers, he entered as a 45th minute substitute for John Maessner and scored a memorable brace against Moroccan World Cup veteran Khalil Azmi.

He later played for the Albany Alleycats, the New Hampshire Phantoms, and the Daytona Tigers, all of the USL. He ended his successful career as captain in 1997 with Daytona where he scored 8 goals. In total, he made over 90 appearances for these four clubs over a three-year period. During his three seasons, he also represented his clubs in international friendlies vs Viborg of Denmark and Belenenses of Portugal.

In the offseason he played in the Indoor National Professional Soccer League for the Tampa Bay Terror and Canton Invaders during the 95/96 season.

== Coach ==
DePalo began his coaching career at Embry–Riddle Aeronautical University. Following his two years as an assistant, he became head coach at Nova Southeastern University where he built the program into a serious contender in the South Region. As a collegiate coach he amassed over 150 wins in 17 seasons.

In 2016 he took on the challenge of coaching the Miami Fusion of the National Premier Soccer League. DePalo led the Fusion to the 2nd Rd of the US Open Cup, as well as wins over the Fort Lauderdale Strikers U-23's and Tampa Bay Rowdies 2.

In 2017, he was Head Coach in the US Development Academy with Kendall SC in Miami. In 2018, Giuseppe was part of the technical staff of Miami FC and helped the club to the NPSL Championship. 2019 brought Giuseppe into the coaching fold at the Seattle Sounders academy where he was an Assistant Coach of all the academy sides, and coached the 06/07 in the Sounders Discovery Program. During his time in Seattle, he was part of the Academy Technical Staff and a member of the club during its MLS Championship Winning Season. In February 2020 Giuseppe accepted an offer to be the Head Coach of Project 51O, the Reserve team of Oakland Roots SC. He was simultaneously the General Manager of the Oakland Roots SC First team. He is a holder of both a UEFA A and USSF A coaching License. Since March 2021, he has been active as an academy coach at Inter Miami CF where he was on the staff of the U15 MLS Next Cup Champions winning the final 2–1 vs Real Salt Lake. Giuseppe is currently Head Coach of the U19's at Inter Miami CF.
