= 2023 BYU Cougars women's soccer team =

American college soccer season

2023 BYU Cougars women's soccer
- Conference: Big 12 Conference
- Record: 20–2–3 (7–0–3 Big 12)
- Head coach: Jennifer Rockwood (29th season)
- Home stadium: South Field

Uniform
Home	Away

2023 Big 12 Conference women's soccer standings
	Conf.						Overall
Team	W		L		T	PCT	W		L		T	PCT
No. 9 Texas Tech ‍†‍‍^{y}	8	–	0	–	2	.900	16	–	2	–	5	.804
No. 4 BYU ‍‍‍^{y}	7	–	0	–	3	.850	20	–	3	–	3	.827
TCU ‍‍‍	6	–	2	–	2	.700	10	–	6	–	3	.605
No. 18 Texas ‍‍‡‍^{y}	6	–	3	–	1	.650	17	–	5	–	2	.750
West Virginia ‍‍‍	5	–	3	–	2	.600	7	–	8	–	4	.474
UCF ‍‍‍	5	–	4	–	1	.550	10	–	7	–	1	.583
Oklahoma State ‍‍‍	5	–	5	–	0	.500	12	–	8	–	0	.600
Baylor ‍‍‍	4	–	4	–	2	.500	9	–	7	–	3	.553
Cincinnati ‍‍‍	2	–	3	–	5	.450	4	–	8	–	7	.395
Oklahoma ‍‍‍	3	–	5	–	2	.400	8	–	10	–	2	.450
Iowa State ‍‍‍	3	–	7	–	0	.300	6	–	11	–	1	.361
Houston ‍‍‍	2	–	7	–	1	.250	8	–	8	–	2	.500
Kansas ‍‍‍	1	–	7	–	2	.200	4	–	8	–	6	.389
Kansas State ‍‍‍	1	–	8	–	1	.150	3	–	12	–	3	.250
† – Conference champion ‡ – 2023 Big 12 Tournament champion y – Invited to the NCAA Tournament; As of December 5, 2023; Rankings from United Soccer Coaches Poll; Source: The Big 12 Conference

The 2023 BYU Cougars women's soccer team represented Brigham Young University during the 2023 NCAA Division I women's soccer season. The Cougars were coached for a 29th consecutive season by Jennifer Rockwood, who was co-coach in 1995 and became the solo head coach in 1996. Before 1995 BYU women's soccer competed as a club team and not as a member of the NCAA. Overall the Cougars had made the NCAA tournament in 23 of the 28 seasons that Rockwood had been the head coach. Joining Rockwood were newly promoted associate head coach Brent Anderson (7th season) and as assistant coaches Steve Magleby (6th season) and Tasha Bell (1st season). Volunteer assistants Rachel Jorgensen (8th season) and Madie Gates (10th season) also return.

The Cougars entered 2023 under a banner of new beginnings. BYU competes as new members of the Big 12 Conference after joining the conference on July 1. The Cougars come off of a season where they finished second in the WCC and went 11–3–7, 6–0–3 in the WCC. The Cougars participated in the NCAA Tournament before falling to North Carolina in the Sweet 16. However the disappointing finish provided BYU with hope for the future as every starter from the 2022 season returned for their first Big 12 run.

The change in conference led to a new scheduling format. Instead of playing conference matches on Thursday and Saturday, BYU played conference matches on Thursday and Monday. Should their record prove to be adequate, BYU would then participate in a conference postseason tournament for the first time in 9 years (the WCC didn't have a postseason conference tournament). The Big 12 Women's Soccer postseason tournament will take place October 28- November 4 at the Round Rock Multipurpose Complex in Round Rock, TX.

== Personnel ==
=== Roster ===
No.	Position	Player	Height	Hometown	Year
0	GK	Lynette Hernaez	5'11"	Corona, CA	Freshman
1	GK	Haven Empey	5'9"	American Fork, UT	Sophomore
2	MF, D	Olivia Griffitts	5'6"	Eagle, ID	RS Junior
3	D	Ella Rustand	5'7"	Tucson, AZ	Freshman
4	F, MF	Avery Frischknecht	5'10"	Mapleton, UT	RS Freshman
5	D	Zoe Jacobs	5'5"	Kaysville, UT	Senior
6	D	Tylie Pratt	5'6"	Gilbert, AZ	Freshman
7	F	Erin Bailey	5'5"	Layton, UT	Sophomore
8	MF	Sierra Pennock	5'5"	Lindon, UT	Sophomore
9	MF	Emma Neff	5'5"	Salt Lake City, UT	RS Freshman
9	MF, F	Carolina Stringfellow	5'4"	Syracuse, UT	Sophomore
10	MF, F	Olivia (Wade) Katoa	5'8"	Kaysville, UT	Senior
11	MF, F	Ellie (Maughan) Boren	5'8"	North Ogden, UT	Senior
12	MF	Jamie Shepherd	5'7"	American Fork, UT	Senior
13	F, MF	Brecken Mozingo	5'6"	Sandy, UT	Senior
13	F, MF	Lytiana Akinaka	5'6"	Maui, HI	Junior
14	MF, F	Ellie Ford	5'8"	Provo, UT	Freshman
15	F	Ellie Walbruch	5'6"	Highland, UT	Sophomore
16	MF, D	Kendell Petersen	5'8"	South Weber, UT	Senior
19	MF, F	Halle Dixon	5'2"	Carlsbad, CA	Freshman
20	F	Camryn Jorgensen	5'5"	Highland, UT	RS Freshman
21	D	Tara Warner	5'6"	Springville, UT	Junior
22	F, MF	Bella Folino	5'6"	Aliso Viejo, CA	RS Senior
23	F	Allie Fryer	5'7"	Spanish Fork, UT	Sophomore
24	MF	Josie Shepherd	5'6"	American Fork, UT	Sophomore
24	MF, D	Izzi Stratton	5'11"	Alpine, UT	Sophomore
25	MF, F	Jacey Wood	5'6"	Las Vegas, NV	Sophomore
26	D	Laveni Vaka	5'6"	Sandy, UT	Senior
28	F	Addie Gardner	5'7"	Highland, UT	Sophomore
33	MF, F	Rachel McCarthy	5'7"	American Fork, UT	Senior
34	GK	Kelsey Hoopes	5'7"	Livermore, CA	Sophomore
66	GK	Savanna (Empey) Mason	5'10"	American Fork, UT	Junior

== Media ==
=== Television & Internet Streaming ===
Most BYU women's soccer matches will have a TV broadcast or internet video stream available. ESPN+ will serve as the primary provider for most home and conference road matches. Some may be elevated to ESPN TV networks. Non-conference road games will be provided by the respective conferences television or streaming platforms. Information on these television and streaming broadcasts can be found under each individual match.

== Schedule and results ==
2023 BYU Cougars women's soccer Game Log
Legend: = Win = Loss = Tie = Canceled Bold = BYU team member
Overall (20–2–3)

Exhibition (2–0–0)
Date	Time (MT)	TV	Opponent	Rank	Stadium	Score	Goal Scorers	Attendance	Referees	Overall record	Exhibition Record	Box Score	Recap
August 10	5:00 PM		@ Rutgers*	#13	Yurcak Field • Piscataway Township, NJ	1–0	**Allie Fryer** 80'	0	N/A	0–0–0	0–0–0	N/A	N/A
August 12	7:00 PM	BYUtv	Idaho State*	#13	South Field • Provo, UT	7–0	**Kendell Petersen** 3'; **Allie Fryer** 4', 25'; **Bella Folino** 17'; **Erin Bailey** 37'; **Rachel McCarthy** (yellow card) 43'; (yellow card) 51' Saydree Bell; **Brecken Mozingo** 52' (pen.), 54'; (yellow card) 81' Ashlee Leonetti	2,325	Jordan Downs, Wendell Ashby, Michael Anglin, Nathan Boone	0–0–0	0–0–0	Box score	Recap

Regular season (14–1–3)

August (5–0–0)
Date	Time (MT)	TV	Opponent	Rank	Stadium	Score	Goal Scorers	Attendance	Referees	Overall record	Big 12 Record	Box Score	Recap
August 17	7:00 PM	ESPN+	#21 St. Louis*	#13	South Field • Provo, UT	3–2	**Bella Folino** 2'; **Olivia Katoa** 10'; 14' Caroline Kelly; **Erin Bailey** 43'; (yellow card) 69' Hannah Sawyer; 86' Emily Gaebe	2,088	Brandon Marion, Karsten Gillwald, Taylor Poulsen, David Wright	1–0–0	0—0–0	Box score	Recap
August 19	7:00 PM	ESPN+	Cal State Fullerton*	#13	South Field • Provo, UT	4–1	**Brecken Mozingo** 6'; **Olivia Katoa** 15'; (yellow card) 46' Olivia Peraza; **Ellie Walbruch** 51'; (yellow card) 70' Jenae Perez; 74' Laurie Ann Moise; **Erin Bailey** 81'	2,656	Servando Berna, Rachel Swett, Leo Vargas, Taylor Mott	2—0—0	0—0—0	Box score	Recap
August 24	6:00 PM	ESPN+	Long Beach State*	#11	South Field • Provo, UT	2–0	**Olivia Katoa** 30'; **Allie Fryer** (yellow card) 46'; **Bella Folino** 48'; (yellow card) 74' Summer Laskey	2,226	Patricia McCracken, Joshua Mills, Robbie Kosinski, Jordan Downs	3—0—0	0—0—0	Box score	Recap
August 26	7:00 PM	MW Network	@ Boise State*	#11	Boas Soccer Complex • Boise, ID	4–1	**Bella Folino** 2'; **Olivia Katoa** 59'; 66' Michaela Justiniani; **Allie Fryer** 72'; **Brecken Mozingo** 76' (pen.); **Allie Fryer** (yellow card) 81'	1,620	Joshua Thompson, Selvedin Mustafic, Riley Jones, Tyler Bates	4—0—0	0—0—0	Box score	Recap
August 31	8:00 PM	ESPN+	#1 UCLA*	#7	South Field • Provo, UT	3–1	**Allie Fryer** (yellow card) 16'; (yellow card) 22' Jayden Perry; **Ellie Walbruch** 25'; **Rachel McCarthy** 37'; 55' Reilyn Turner; **Erin Bailey** 79'	5,209	Ryan Starr, Wendell Ashby, Karsten Gillwald	5—0—0	0—0—0	Box score	Recap

September (4–1–2)
Date	Time (MT)	TV	Opponent	Rank	Stadium	Score	Goal Scorers	Attendance	Referees	Overall record	Big 12 Record	Box Score	Recap
September 2	7:00 PM	ESPN+	@ Utah Valley*	#7	Clyde Field • Orem, UT	6–1	**Brecken Mozingo** 11'; **Allie Fryer** 21'; **Erin Bailey** 34', 38'; 36' Sadie Beardall; **Ellie Boren** 62'; **Ellie Walbruch** 82'	4,742	Alex Krelo, Joshua Mills, Trin Anglin, Adam Brady	6–0–0	0–0–0	Box score	Recap
September 9	7:00 PM	P12+	@ Utah*	#1	Ute Soccer Field • Salt Lake City, UT	6–1	**Allie Fryer** 4', 60'; **Olivia Katoa** 25'; **Rachel McCarthy** 32'; 36' (pen.) Katie O'Kane; **Olivia Griffitts** 53', 65'	3,224	Jeff Arthurholtz, Robert Kosinski, Taylor Poulsen, Michael Anglin	7–0–0	0–0–0	Box score	Recap
September 14	7:00 PM	ESPNU	TCU	#1	South Field • Provo, UT	3–3	2' Gracie Brian; 27', 61' Seven Castain; **Rachel McCarthy** 36'; **Allie Fryer** 54'; (yellow card) 75' AJ Hennessey; **Erin Bailey** 77'	5,416	Shane Butler, Cameron Siler, Jordan Downs, Leo Vargas	7–0–1	0–0–1	Box score	Recap
September 16	3:00 PM	MW Network	@ Utah State*	#1	Chuck and Gloria Bell Soccer Field • Logan, UT	0–1	51' Summer Diamond; **Allie Fryer** (yellow card) 56'; **Jamie Shepherd** (red card) 88'	2,013	Michael Gebreslassie, Nathan Boone, Zackary Werner, Brad Church	7–1–1	0–0–1	Box score	Recap
September 21	6:00 PM	ESPN+	@ Baylor	#6	Betty Lou Mays Soccer Field • Waco, TX	4–0	**Rachel McCarthy** 13'; **Allie Fryer** 21'; **Brecken Mozingo** 45' (pen.), 77'	843	Emma Richards, Muhammad Kaleia, Janae Thompson, Habeeb Hooshmand	8–1–1	1–0–1	Box score	Recap
September 25	6:00 PM	LHN	@ #14 Texas	#6	Mike A. Myers Stadium • Austin, TX	3–2	5', 66' Lexi Missimo; (yellow card) 31' Lauren Lapomarda; **Ellie Walbruch** 43'; **Olivia Katoa** 62'; **Ellie Walbruch** (yellow card) 67'; **Erin Bailey** 84'	1,921	Elvis Mahmutovic, Jennifer Dumaine, Ryan Lindskog, Estefania Estrada	9–1–1	2–0–1	Box score	Recap
September 28	7:00 PM	ESPN+	Cincinnati	#6	South Field • Provo, UT	1–1	2' Ellie Flower; **Brecken Mozingo** 47' (pen.)	4,184	Lorenzo Hernandez, Wendell Ashby, Taylor Mott, Taylor Poulsen	9–1–2	2–0–2	Box score	Recap

October (5–0–1)
Date	Time (MT)	TV	Opponent	Rank	Stadium	Score	Goal Scorers	Attendance	Referees	Overall record	Big 12 Record	Box Score	Recap
October 2	5:00 PM	ESPN+	@ Iowa State	#6	Cyclone Sports Complex • Ames, IA	7–0	**Bella Folino** 2'; **Kendell Petersen** (yellow card) 4'; **Brecken Mozingo** 20'; **Erin Bailey** 38', 50'; (yellow card) 39' Team; **Ellie Boren** 60'; **Zoe Jacobs** 65'; **Ellie Walbruch** 68'; **Camryn Jorgensen** (yellow card) 86'	809	Zachary Richter, Ryan Starr, Braxton Williams, Aaron Valley	10–1–2	3–0–2	Box score	Recap
October 5	7:00 PM	ESPN+	#7 Texas Tech	#7	South Field • Provo, UT	2–2	**Jamie Shepherd** 18'; 39' Sam Courtwright; 61' Alex Kerr; **Ellie Walbruch** 63'; (yellow card) 72' Kylie Bahr; (yellow card) 79' Gisselle Kozarski	5,201		10–1–3	3–0–3	Box score	Recap
October 9	5:00 PM	ESPN+	Kansas State	#7	South Field • Provo, UT	2–0	**Allie Fryer** 76'; (yellow card) 72' Kenzi Gillespie; **Kendell Petersen** 83'	4,881	Adrian Gonzales, Katarzyna Wasiak, Blake Griffiths, Leo Vargas	11–1–3	4–0–3	Box score	Recap
October 12	6:00 PM	ESPN+	@ Oklahoma State	#8	Neal Patterson Stadium • Stillwater, OK	3–0	**Brecken Mozingo** 9'; **Ellie Walbruch** 35'; **Allie Fryer** 68'	1,201	Brandon Gardner, Matthew Rodman, Jay Norris, Jack Damrill	12–1–3	5–0–3	Box score	Recap
October 16	6:00 PM	ESPN+	@ Oklahoma	#8	John Crain Field • Norman, OK	2–0	**Olivia Katoa** (yellow card) 22'; **Rachel McCarthy** 42'; (yellow card) 46' Ella Pappas; **Ellie Walbruch** 72'; (yellow card) 75' Danielle Wolfe	1,754	Tim Debysingh, Fevzi Demirhan, Will Franklin, Jay Norris	13–1–3	6–0–3	Box score	Recap
October 23	6:00 PM	ESPN+	UCF	#7	South Field • Provo, UT	3–2	**Allie Fryer** 3'; **Olivia Katoa** 20'; 34' Chloe Netzel; **Brecken Mozingo** 43'; (yellow card) 62' Annika Huhta; 80' (pen.) Mia Asenjo	4,683	Brandon Stevis, Kristin Paterson, Nathan Boone, Wendell Ashby	14–1–3	7–0–3	Box score	Recap

Big 12 Tournament (2–1–0)

Big 12 tournament
Date	Time (MT)	TV	Opponent	Rank	Stadium	Score	Goal Scorers	Attendance	Referees	Overall record	Big 12 Record	Box Score	Recap
October 30	4:30 PM	ESPN+	vs. ^{(10-seed)} Oklahoma	#7 ^{(2-seed)}	Mike A. Myers Stadium • Austin, TX	6–0	**Bella Folino** 9', 61'; **Allie Fryer** 50'; **Olivia Katoa** 68'; (yellow card) 69' Hadley Murrell; **Ellie Boren** (yellow card) 69'; **Ellie Walbruch** 89'	N/A	Austin Saini, Laura Chambers, Janae Thompson, Brandon Gardner	15–1–3	–	Box score	Recap
November 1	6:00 PM	ESPN+	vs. ^{(6-seed)} UCF	#6 ^{(2-seed)}	Mike A. Myers Stadium • Austin, TX	4–1	**Olivia Katoa** 9', 31'; (yellow card) 29' Audrey Bucks; **Brecken Mozingo** 39'; **Ellie Walbruch** 44'; (yellow card) 79' Katie Bradley	N/A		16–1–3	–	Box score	Recap
November 4	6:00 PM	ESPN+	vs. ^{(4-seed)} Texas	#6 ^{(2-seed)}	Round Rock Multipurpose Complex • Round Rock, TX	1–3	2', 55' Lexi Missimo; **Brecken Mozingo** 8'; (yellow card) 68' Breana Thompson; 76' Holly Ward	1,032	Corey Rockwell, Jarred Mosher, Maggi Short, Arturo Ibarra	16–2–3	–	Box score	Recap

NCAA Tournament (4–0–0)

NCAA tournament
Date	Time (MT)	TV	Opponent	Rank	Stadium	Score	Goal Scorers	Attendance	Referees	Overall record	Big 12 Record	Box Score	Recap
November 10	6:00 PM	ESPN+	Utah State	#6 ^{(1-seed)}	South Field • Provo, UT	2–0	**Kendell Petersen** 10'; **Olivia Katoa** 73'	4,569	Nathan Boone, Karsten Gillwald, Robert Kosinski, Michael Anglin	17–2–3	–	Box score	Recap
November 16	7:00 PM	ESPN+	#22 ^{(8-seed)} USC	#6 ^{(1-seed)}	South Field • Provo, UT	1–0	**Izzi Stratton** (yellow card) 54'; **Bella Folino** 58'	4,176	Jeff Arthurholtz, Rachel Swett, Brad Church, Taylor Mott	18–2–3	–	Box score	Recap
November 18	6:00 PM	ESPN+	#20 ^{(5-seed)} Michigan State	#6 ^{(1-seed)}	South Field • Provo, UT	3–1	52' Gabby Mueller; (yellow card) 55' Celia Gaynor; **Brecken Mozingo** 55' (pen.), 60'; **Ellie Walbruch** 80'	3,695	Megan McCain, Michael Anglin, Cameron Siler, Brad Church	19–2–3	–	Box score	Recap
November 24	6:00 PM	ESPN+	#13 ^{(3-seed)} North Carolina	#6 ^{(1-seed)}	South Field • Provo, UT	4–3	2' Maycee Bell; 9', 20' Ally Sentnor; **Laveni Vaka** (yellow card) 19'; **Bella Folino** 61', 82'; **Brecken Mozingo** 81'; **Olivia Katoa** 89'	3,487	Jaclyn Metz, Karsten Gillwald, Rachel Swett, Nathan Boone	20–2–3	–	Box score	Recap
December 1	6:30 PM	ESPNU	vs. #3 ^{(2-seed)} Stanford	#6 ^{(1-seed)}	WakeMed Soccer Park • Cary, NC	–	–	–	–	–	–	–	–

* indicates a non-conference game. All rankings from the United Soccer Coaches Poll on the date of the contest.

== Announcers ==
- Idaho State: Greg Wrubell, Carla Swensen-Haslam, & Brett Hammer
- St. Louis: Greg Wrubell, Carla Swensen-Haslam, & Brett Hammer
- Cal State Fullerton: Greg Wrubell, Cassidy Smith, & Brett Hammer
- Long Beach State: Spencer Linton, Carla Swensen-Haslam, & Brett Hammer
- Boise State: Leonard Barry & Craig Lawson
- UCLA: Greg Wrubell, Carla Swensen-Haslam, & Jason Shepherd
- Utah Valley: Brandon Crow & Ben Perkins
- Utah: Jacob Suomi
- TCU: Jenn Hildreth & Marion Crowder
- Utah State: Stockton Jewkes & Casen Miller
- Baylor: Lincoln Rose & Ally Ashkinos
- Texas: Alex Loeb & Jessica Stamp
- Cincinnati: Spencer Linton, Josie Gelalich, & Jason Shepherd
- Iowa State: Tom Kroeschell & Lindsey Long
- Texas Tech: Greg Wrubell, Josie Gelalich, & Jason Shepherd
- Kansas State: Greg Wrubell, Carla Swensen-Haslam, & Jason Shepherd
- Oklahoma State: Mike Wolfe & Anna Beffer
- Oklahoma: Chad McKee & Marissa McMahand
- UCF: Greg Wrubell, Carla Swensen-Haslam, & Jason Shepherd
- Big XII Quarterfinal- Oklahoma: Daniel Gillman & Jessica Stamp
- Big XII Semifinal- UCF: Daniel Gillman & Jessica Stamp
- Big XII Championship- Texas: Daniel Gillman & Jessica Stamp
- NCAA 1st Round- Utah State: Greg Wrubell & Carla Swensen-Haslam
- NCAA 2nd Round- USC: Greg Wrubell & Carla Swensen-Haslam
- NCAA 3rd Round- Michigan State: Greg Wrubell & Carla Swensen-Haslam
- NCAA Quarterfinal- North Carolina: Jarom Jordan, Carla Swensen-Haslam, & Kenedee Miller
- NCAA Semifinal- Stanford: Jenn Hildreth & Lori Lindsey (ESPNU); Greg Wrubell (BYU Radio)

== Rankings ==
Regular season Polls
Poll	Pre- Season	Week 1	Week 2	Week 3	Week 4	Week 5	Week 6	Week 7	Week 8	Week 9	Week 10	Week 11	Week 12 Postseason	Final
United Soccer Coaches	13	11	7	1	1	6	6	6	7	8	7	7	6	
Top Drawer Soccer	12	11	9	3	2	6	6	10	8	4	4	4	8 ^{(1st Round)} 7 ^{(2nd Rd, Sweet 16)} 4 ^{(Elite 8)}	

Legend
	Increase in ranking
	Decrease in ranking
	Not ranked previous week
(RV)	Received Votes
