= 2022 BYU Cougars women's soccer team =

American college soccer season

2022 BYU Cougars women's soccer

2022 NCAA Division I women's soccer tournament, Sweet 16
- Conference: West Coast Conference
- Record: 11–3–7 (6–0–3 WCC)
- Head coach: Jennifer Rockwood (28th season)
- Home stadium: South Field

Uniform
Home	Away

2022 West Coast Conference women's soccer standings
	Conf.						Overall
Team	W		L		T	PCT	W		L		T	PCT
No. 22 Santa Clara ‍†‍‍^{y}	7	–	0	–	2	.889	12	–	7	–	3	.614
No. 14 BYU ‍‍‍^{y}	6	–	0	–	3	.833	11	–	3	–	7	.690
Gonzaga ‍‍‍	5	–	1	–	3	.722	10	–	3	–	5	.694
Portland ‍‍‍^{y}	5	–	4	–	0	.556	12	–	5	–	4	.667
Pepperdine ‍‍‍	3	–	3	–	3	.500	9	–	4	–	5	.639
San Francisco ‍‍‍	3	–	3	–	3	.500	8	–	5	–	6	.579
Pacific ‍‍‍	2	–	3	–	4	.444	7	–	3	–	10	.600
Saint Mary's ‍‍‍	1	–	4	–	4	.333	5	–	6	–	7	.472
Loyola Marymount ‍‍‍	1	–	8	–	0	.111	3	–	8	–	6	.353
San Diego ‍‍‍	0	–	7	–	2	.111	2	–	12	–	5	.237
† – Conference champion y – Invited to the NCAA tournament As of December 6, 2022; Rankings from United Soccer Coaches Poll; Source:West Coast Conference

The 2022 BYU Cougars women's soccer team represented Brigham Young University during the 2022 NCAA Division I women's soccer season. The Cougars were coached for a 28th consecutive season by Jennifer Rockwood, who was co-coach in 1995 and became the solo head coach in 1996. Before 1995 BYU women's soccer competed as a club team and not as a member of the NCAA. Overall the Cougars had made the NCAA tournament in 22 of the 27 seasons that Rockwood had been the head coach. Joining Rockwood as assistant coaches are Brent Anderson (6th season) and Steve Magleby (5th season) with volunteer assistants Rachel Jorgensen (7th season) and Madie Gates (9th season). The Cougars came off of a season where they were co-champions in the WCC and went 17–4–3, 8–1–0 in the WCC. The Cougars went on to advance to their first ever College Cup, and tied in the championship with Florida State before losing on penalties to finish as national runner–up. The Cougars staff was also named the Women's Staff of the Year. The Cougars enter 2022 having been picked to win the WCC Championship in their final season before heading to the Big 12 Conference for the 2023 season.

== Personnel ==
=== Roster ===
No.	Position	Player	Height	Hometown	Year
2	MF, D	Olivia Smith	5'6"	Eagle, ID	RS Sophomore
4	F, MF	Avery Frischknecht	5'10"	Mapleton, UT	Freshman
5	D	Zoe Jacobs	5'5"	Kaysville, UT	Junior
6	MF	Sierra Pennock	5'5"	Lindon, UT	Freshman
7	F	Erin Bailey	5'5"	Layton, UT	Freshman
8	MF, D	Abbie Kotter	5'3"	Providence, UT	Sophomore
9	MF	Emma Neff	5'5"	Salt Lake City, UT	Freshman
10	MF, F	Olivia Wade	5'8"	Kaysville, UT	Junior
11	MF, F	Ellie Maughan	5'8"	North Ogden, UT	Junior
12	MF	Jamie Shepherd	5'7"	American Fork, UT	Junior
13	F, MF	Brecken Mozingo	5'6"	Sandy, UT	Junior
16	MF, D	Kendell Petersen	5'8"	South Weber, UT	Junior
19	F, MF	Paola Garcia	5'3"	Mapleton, UT	Sophomore
20	F	Camryn Jorgensen	5'5"	Highland, UT	Freshman
21	D	Tara Warner	5'6"	Springville, UT	Sophomore
22	F, MF	Bella Folino	5'6"	Aliso Viejo, CA	RS Junior
23	F	Allie Fryer	5'7"	Spanish Fork, UT	Freshman
24	MF, D	Izzi Stratton	5'11"	Alpine, UT	Freshman
25	F	Ruby Hladek	5'7"	Ladera Ranch, CA	RS Freshman
26	D	Laveni Vaka	5'6"	Sandy, UT	Junior
27	F	Daviana Vaka	5'7"	Sandy, UT	RS Sophomore
28	D	Natalee Wells	5'7"	Alpine, UT	Senior
32	GK	Taygan Sill	5'8"	Kaysville, UT	Freshman
33	MF, F	Rachel McCarthy	5'7"	American Fork, UT	Sophomore
66	GK	Savanna Empey	5'10"	American Fork, UT	Sophomore

== Media ==
=== Television & Internet Streaming ===
Most BYU women's soccer will have a TV broadcast or internet video stream available. BYUtv and WCC Network will once again serve as the primary providers. Information on these television and streaming broadcasts can be found under each individual match.

=== Nu Skin BYU Sports Network ===
For a ninth consecutive season the BYU Sports Network will air BYU Cougars women's soccer games. Greg Wrubell will provide play-by-play for most games with Jason Shepherd filling-in when Wrubell has football or basketball duties. BYU Radio's KUMT station 107.9 FM will act as the flagship stations for women's soccer, though the BYU Radio App and byuradio.org will carry a few games exclusively.

Affiliates

- BYU Radio- KUMT 107.9 FM

== Schedule and results ==
2022 BYU Cougars women's soccer Game Log
Legend: = Win = Loss = Tie = Canceled Bold = BYU team member
Exhibition (0–1–0)

Exhibition (0–1–0)
Date	Time (MT)	TV	Opponent	Rank	Stadium	Score	Goal Scorers	Attendance	Referees	Overall record	Exhibition Record	Box Score	Recap
August 13	4:00 PM		@ No. 10 North Carolina*	No. 3	Dorrance Field • Chapel Hill, NC	2–0	13' Tori DellaPeruta; 48' Avery Patterson	1,530	Bill Dittmar, Khadime Sabara, Ross McKernan	0–0–0	0–1–0	Box score	Recap

Regular season (10–2–6)

August (2–0–1)
Date	Time (MT)	TV	Opponent	Rank	Stadium	Score	Goal Scorers	Attendance	Referees	Overall record	WCC Record	Box Score	Recap
August 18	8:00 PM	ESPN+	@ Cal State Fullerton*	No. 3	Titan Stadium • Fullerton, CA	1–0	**Bella Folino** 61'; (yellow card) 70' Olivia Peraza	1,323	Servando Berna, Maria Magana, Ana Valdez	1–0–0	0–0–0	Box score	Recap
August 26	5:00 PM	BTN	@ No. 20 Ohio State*	No. 9	Jesse Owens Stadium • Columbus, OH	2–0	**Jamie Shepherd** 65', 72'	1,497	Nicholas Balcer, Audra Fullen, Ben Miller	2–0–0	0—0–0	Box score	Recap
August 29	3:00 PM	byutv.org	No. 25 Colorado*	No. 9	South Field • Provo, UT	2–2	**Olivia Wade** 64'; 70' Jenny Byer; **Jamie Shepherd** 72'; 81' Shyra James; **Jamie Shepherd** (yellow card) 90'	1,886	Corey Rockwell, Karsten Gillwald, Cam Skyler	2—0—1	0—0—0	Box score	Recap

September (2–2–2)
Date	Time (MT)	TV	Opponent	Rank	Stadium	Score	Goal Scorers	Attendance	Referees	Overall record	WCC Record	Box Score	Recap
September 1	7:00 PM	byutv.org	Alabama*	No. 6	South Field • Provo, UT	2–3	**Rachel McCarthy** 11'; 17' Riley Mattingly Parker; 23' (pen.) Felicia Knox; 23' Gianna Paul; (yellow card) 56' Macy Clem; **Rachel McCarthy** (yellow card) 61'; (yellow card) 65' Sydney Japic; **Laveni Vaka** (yellow card) 72'; (yellow card) 74' Gianna Paul; **Brecken Mozingo** 84'	3,221	Elvis Muhmutovic, Alan Jimenez, Jordan Downs	2–1–1	0–0–0	Box Score	Recap
September 3	8:00 PM	byutv.org	CSUN*	No. 6	South Field • Provo, UT	5–0	**Brecken Mozingo** 44', 84' (pen.); **Bella Folino** 58'; **Rachel McCarthy** (yellow card) 66'; **Sierra Pennock** 68'; (yellow card) 75' Harlee Martin-Ditillo; **Allie Fryer** 83'	2,750	Patricia McCracken, Rachel Swett, Bennett Savage	3–1–1	0–0–0	Box score	Recap
September 8	8:00 PM	BYUtv	Arkansas*	No. 13	South Field • Provo, UT	3–3	11' Jessica De Filippo; **Brecken Mozingo** 15'; 11' Anna Podojil; **Bella Folino** 21'; **Sierra Pennock** 36'; (yellow card) 66' Bea Franklin; 83' Ellie Podojil	2,813	Sean Wright, David Rozek, Taylor Paulsen	3–1–2	0–0–0	Box score	Recap
September 10	6:00 PM	byutv.org	Utah Valley*	No. 13	South Field • Provo, UT	2—4	**Brecken Mozingo** 5'; 12' Hannah Lee; 25' Heather Stainbrook; **Ruby Hladek** (yellow card) 35'; **Allie Fryer** 41'; 45' Isabella Stewart; 79' Julianna Carter	2,655	Megan McCain, Karsten Gillwald, Brayden Allen	3–2–2	0–0–0	Box score	Recap
September 15	5:00 PM	SCS Central	@ Utah State*	No. 25	Chuck and Gloria Bell Soccer Field • Logan, UT	1–1	**Brecken Mozingo** 19'; 83' Whitney Lopez	1,511	Michael Anglin, Taylor Mott, Nathan Boone	3–2–3	0—0—0	Box score	Recap
September 17	7:00 PM	BYUtv	Utah*	No. 25	South Field • Provo, UT	2–1	**Olivia Wade** 78', 89'; 89' Ryann Cull	3,835	Younes Marrakchi, Nathan Boone, Allen Pickett	4–2–3	0–0–0	Box score	Recap

October (4–0–3)
Date	Time (MT)	TV	Opponent	Rank	Stadium	Score	Goal Scorers	Attendance	Referees	Overall record	WCC Record	Box Score	Recap
October 1	1:00 PM	SCS Pacific	@ Saint Mary's	–	Saint Mary's Stadium • Moraga, CA	0–0	Isabella Santavicca (yellow card) 60'; Alessandra Towle (yellow card) 76'	364	Nathan Max, Juan Cruz, Ritesh Chotu	4–2–4	0–0–1	Box score	Recap
October 5	7:00 PM	BYUtv	San Francisco	–	South Field • Provo, UT	6–0	**Allie Fryer** 31'; **Brecken Mozingo** 36'; **Ellie Maughan** 49'; **Jamie Shepherd** 51'; **Olivia Wade** 58'; **Erin Bailey** 82'; (yellow card) 89' Emmie Paulson	2,988	Liam Leonard, Allen Pickett, Brayden Allen	5–2–4	1–0–1	Box score	Recap
October 8	8:00 PM	SCS Pacific	@ Pacific	–	Knoles Field • Stockton, CA	1–1	**Olivia Wade** 14'; 75' Haley Johnson	424	Alex Del Angel, Neal Rogers, Angeles Pineda	5–2–5	1–0–2	Box score	Recap
October 15	7:00 PM	byutv.org	No. 14 Portland	–	South Field • Provo, UT	4–1	**Olivia Wade** 13'; **Jamie Shepherd** 33'; **Brecken Mozingo** 67', 76'; 70' Colby Wilson	3,447	Karen De Leon, Wendell Ashby, Taylor Mott	6–2–5	2–0–2	Box score	Recap
October 19	4:00 PM	SCS Atlantic	@ Pepperdine	No. 19	Tari Frahm Rokus Field • Malibu, CA	4–3	**Olivia Smith** 18'; **Jamie Shepherd** 27'; **Allie Fryer** 40', 67'; 47' Carlee Giammona; 61', 90' Tatum Wynalda	302	Daniel Radford, Morgan Abbitt, Kira Helmer	7–2–5	3–0–2	Box score	Recap
October 22	7:00 PM	byutv.org	Gonzaga	No. 19	South Field • Provo, UT	2–1	(yellow card) 42' Maddie Kemp; **Bella Folino** 48'; 49' Kate Doyle; **Allie Fryer** 67'; **Kendell Peterson** (yellow card) 88'	2,797	Brandon Gardener, Nathan Boone, Allen Pickett	8–2–5	4–0–2	Box score	Recap
October 29	6:00 PM	BYUtv	No. 25 Santa Clara	No. 13	South Field • Provo, UT	0–0	(yellow card) 87' Keren Goor	3,089	Ivan DebCristofaro, Karsten Gillwald, Taylor Mott	8–2–6	4–0–3	Box score	Recap

November (2–0–0)
Date	Time (MT)	TV	Opponent	Rank	Stadium	Score	Goal Scorers	Attendance	Referees	Overall record	WCC Record	Box Score	Recap
November 2	8:00 PM	WCC Network	@ San Diego	No. 15	Torero Stadium • San Diego, CA	6–0	**Ellie Maughan** 8'; **Brecken Mozingo** 13'; **Bella Folino** 18'; **Jamie Shepherd** 24'; **Allie Fryer** 33'; **Olivia Wade** 68'	405	Karen Callado, Victor Ruiz, Emmanuel Padilla	9–2–6	5–0–3	Box score	Recap
November 5	8:00 PM	SCS Atlantic	@ Loyola Marymount	No. 15	Sullivan Field • Los Angeles, CA	2–1	**Brecken Mozingo** 31', 79'; 49' Madison Werner; **Bella Folino** (yellow card) 63'; **Laveni Vaka** (yellow card) 75'	574	Anya Voigt, Alana Ethridge, Anna Valdez	10–2–6	6–0–3	Box score	Recap

Postseason (1–1–1)

NCAA tournament
Date	Time (MT)	TV	Opponent	Rank	Stadium	Score	Goal Scorers	Attendance	Referees	Overall record	WCC Record	Box Score	Recap
November 11	6:00 PM	ESPN+	Utah Valley*	No. 15 ^{(6-seed)}	South Field • Provo, UT	3–0	**Allie Fryer** 39'; (yellow card) 50' Jenna Shepherd; (yellow card) 58' Juliana Carter; **Olivia Wade** (yellow card) 67'; **Tara Warner** 70'; **Rachel McCarthy** 79'; **Jamie Shepherd** (yellow card) 81'	3,839	Bradley Miller, Brad Church, Jordan Downs	11–2–6	–	Box score	Recap
November 17	1:00 PM	ESPN+	vs. No. 7 ^{(3-seed)} Stanford*	No. 15 ^{(6-seed)}	Dorrance Field • Chapel Hill, NC	**T 1–1** ^{(Pen. 5–4)}	**Olivia Wade** 4'; **Kendell Peterson** (yellow card) 15'; 22' Jasmine Aikey; **Brecken Mozingo** (penalty scored); (penalty scored) Abby Greubel; **Olivia Wade** (penalty scored); (penalty scored) Maya Doms; **Olivia Smith** (penalty scored); (penalty scored) Juila Leontini; **Laveni Vaka** (penalty scored); (penalty scored) Jasmine Aikey; **Ellie Maughan** (penalty scored); (penalty missed) Elise Evans	223	Mark Kadleck, Raymond Thomas, Marcus Moss	11–2–7	–	Box score	Recap
November 19	9:30 AM	ESPN+	@ No. 2 ^{(2-seed)} North Carolina*	No. 15 ^{(6-seed)}	Dorrance Field • Chapel Hill, NC	2–3	17' Talia DellaPeruta; **Olivia Wade** 19'; (yellow card) 53' Avery Patterson; 58', 65' Maddie Dahlien; **Allie Fryer** 69'	1,605	Lucas Feather, Bill Dittmar, Duane Paquette	11–3–7	–	Box score	Recap

* indicates a non-conference game. All rankings from the United Soccer Coaches Poll on the date of the contest.

== Announcers ==
- North Carolina: Greg Wrubell & Rachel Jorgensen (BYU Radio App)
- Cal State Fullerton: Kienan Dixon & Michael Martinez (ESPN+); Greg Wrubell & Rachel Jorgensen (BYU Radio 107.9 FM & App)
- Ohio State: Dean Linke & Lauren Link (BTN); Greg Wrubell & Rachel Jorgensen (BYU Radio 107.9 FM & App)
- Colorado: Spencer Linton, Carla Haslam, & Jason Shepherd (byutv.org); Greg Wrubell & Rachel Jorgensen (BYU Radio 107.9 FM & App)
- Alabama: Jason Shepherd & Carla Haslam (byutv.org); Greg Wrubell & Rachel Jorgensen (BYU Radio 107.9 FM & App)
- CSUN: Landon Southwick & Carla Haslam (byutv.org); Jason Shepherd & Rachel Jorgensen (BYU Radio 107.9 FM & App)
- Arkansas: Spencer Linton, Carla Haslam, & Jason Shepherd (BYUtv); Greg Wrubell & Rachel Jorgensen (BYU Radio 107.9 FM & App)
- Utah Valley: Jarom Jordan & Carla Haslam (byutv.org); Jason Shepherd & Rachel Jorgensen (BYU Radio 107.9 FM & App)
- Utah State: Verl Johansen & Stockton Jewkes (SCS Central); Greg Wrubell & Rachel Jorgensen (BYU Radio 107.9 FM & App)
- Utah: Jarom Jordan & Carla Haslam (BYUtv); Jason Shepherd & Rachel Jorgensen (BYU Radio 107.9 FM & App)
- Saint Mary's: Brian Brownfield & Rodrigo Donor (SCS Pacific); Greg Wrubell & Rachel Jorgensen (BYU Radio App)
- San Francisco: Jarom Jordan, Carla Haslam, & Jason Shepherd (BYUtv); Greg Wrubell & Rachel Jorgensen (BYU Radio 107.9 FM & App)
- Pacific: Dennis Ackerman (SCS Pacific); Jason Shepherd & Rachel Jorgensen (BYU Radio 107.9 FM & App)
- Portland: Spencer Linton & Carla Haslam (byutv.org); Jason Shepherd & Rachel Jorgensen (BYU Radio 107.9 FM & App)
- Pepperdine: Christian Miles (SCS Atlantic); Greg Wrubell & Rachel Jorgensen (BYU Radio 107.9 FM & App)
- Gonzaga: Jarom Jordan & Carla Haslam (byutv.org); Jason Shepherd & Rachel Jorgensen (BYU Radio 107.9 FM & App)
- Santa Clara: Spencer Linton, Carla Haslam, & Jason Shepherd (BYUtv); Greg Wrubell & Rachel Jorgensen (BYU Radio 107.9 FM & App)
- San Diego: Braden Surprenant (WCC Net); Greg Wrubell & Rachel Jorgensen (BYU Radio 107.9 FM & App)
- Loyola Marymount: Jonathan Grace (SCS Atlantic); Jason Shepherd & Rachel Jorgensen (BYU Radio 107.9 FM & App)
- Utah Valley: Spencer Linton & Cassidy Smith (ESPN+); Jason Shepherd & Rachel Jorgensen (BYU Radio 107.9 FM & App)
- Stanford: Matt Krause (ESPN+); Greg Wrubell & Rachel Jorgensen (BYU Radio 107.9 FM & App)
- North Carolina: Matt Krause (ESPN+); Jason Shepherd & Rachel Jorgensen (BYU Radio 107.9 FM & App)

== Rankings ==
Regular season Polls
Poll	Pre- Season	Week 1	Week 2	Week 3	Week 4	Week 5	Week 6	Week 7	Week 8	Week 9	Week 10	Week 11	Week 12 Postseason	Final
United Soccer Coaches	3	9	6	13	25	RV	RV	RV	RV	19	13	15	15	14
Top Drawer Soccer	4	5	5	7	14	14	20	NR	NR	22	15	17	16 ^{(1st Round)} 14 ^{(2nd Rd, Sweet 16)} 11 ^{(Elite 8)} 11 ^{(Final 4)}	11

Legend
	Increase in ranking
	Decrease in ranking
	Not ranked previous week
(RV)	Received Votes
