= 2021 NCAA Division I women's soccer championship game =

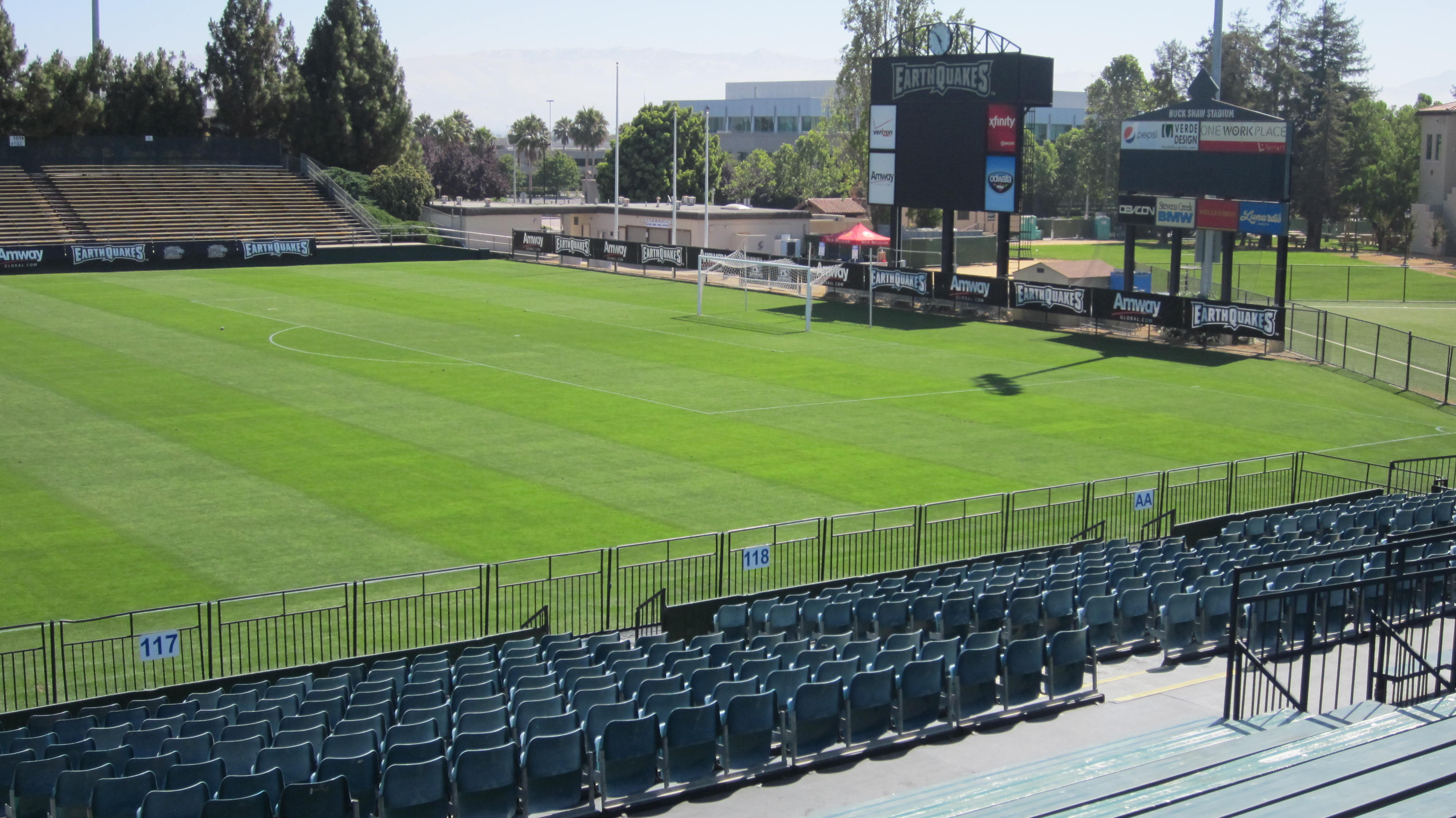
- Stevens Stadium in Santa Clara hosted the match
- Event: 2021 NCAA Division I women's soccer tournament
Florida State	BYU
ACC	Big 12
0	0
- after extra time Florida State won 4–3 on penalties
- Date: December 6, 2021
- Venue: Stevens Stadium, Santa Clara, CA
- Referee: JC Griggs
- Attendance: 7,087

The 2021 NCAA Division I women's soccer championship game (also known as the 2021 NCAA Division I Women's College Cup) was played on December 6, 2021, at Stevens Stadium in Santa Clara, California, and determined the winner of the 2021 NCAA Division I women's soccer tournament, the national collegiate women's soccer championship in the United States. This was the 40th. edition of this tournament organised by the NCAA.

The match featured Florida State (21–1–3), which played its 6th. final, and BYU (17–5–3), which made its 1st. appearance in the final. After both teams tied on regular time, extra time was played but the score remained the same so a penalty shoot-out was conducted to determine a champion. Florida State leaded the series 4–3 winning its third NCAA national title and its 27th from ACC membership.

Seminoles goalkeeper Cristina Roque, who had two saves in the penalty shoot-out, was named "Defensive Most Outstanding Player for the College Cup". Roque had an average of 1.36 saves per match. On the other hand, Zhao Yujie scored the goal for the 4–3 win on penalties that gave Florida State its third national title.

== Road to the final ==
The NCAA Division I women's soccer tournament, sometimes known as the College Cup, is an American intercollegiate soccer tournament conducted by the National Collegiate Athletic Association (NCAA), and determines the Division I women's national champion. The tournament has been formally held since 1982, when it was a twelve-team tournament.

Florida State (ACC)		Round	BYU (Big 12)	
Opponent	Result	NCAA Tournament	Opponent	Result
South Alabama (SBC)	3–0 (H)	First round	New Mexico (MWC)	6–0 (A)
SMU (AAC)	5–1 (H)	Second round	Alabama (SEC)	4–1 (H)
Pepperdine (WCC)	1–0 (H)	Round of 16	Virginia (ACC)	1–0 (H)
Michigan (Big Ten)	1–0 (H)	Quarterfinal	South Carolina (SEC)	4–1 (A)
Rutgers (Big Ten)	1–0 (N)	College Cup	Santa Clara (WCC)	0–0 (3–2 p) (N)

== Match details ==
2021 College Cup Final
December 6, 2021

Florida State	0–0 (a.e.t.)	BYU
	Report
Penalties
Robbins (penalty scored); Payne (penalty scored); Carle (penalty missed); Howell (penalty scored); Zhao (penalty scored)	4–3	(penalty scored) Colohan; (penalty missed) Shepherd; (penalty scored) Mozingo; (penalty missed) Folino; (penalty scored) Wade

Stevens Stadium, Santa Clara, CA
Attendance: 7,087
Referee: JC Griggs

Florida State
BYU

GK	1	(Puerto Rico) Cristina Roque
DF	11	(United States) Kirsten Pavlisko
DF	16	(Canada) Gabrielle Carle
DF	25	(United States) Emily Madril
MF	6	(United States) Jaelin Howell	(yellow card) 32'
MF	8	(United States) Lauren Flynn
MF	12	(Republic of Ireland) Heather Payne
MF	26	(United States) Clara Robbins
FW	2	(United States) Jenna Nighswonger
FW	10	(Jamaica) Jody Brown
FW	30	(Sweden) Beata Olsson
Substitutions:
MF	33	(China) Zhao Yujie		Substituted on
FW	4	(United States) Kristina Lynch		Substituted on
MF	17	(England) Emma Bissell		Substituted on
MF	18	(Portugal) Maria Alagoa		Substituted on
Head Coach:
(United States) Mark Krikorian

GK	32	(United States) Cassidy Smith
DF	4	(United States) Grace Johnson
DF	26	(Tonga) Laveni Vaka
MF	2	(United States) Olivia Smith
MF	8	(United States) Mikayla Colohan	(yellow card) 79'
MF	10	(United States) Olivia Wade
MF	12	(United States) Jamie Shepherd
MF	16	(United States) Kendell Petersen
FW	3	(United States) Makaylie Moore
FW	5	(United States) Brecken Mozingo
FW	20	(United States) Cameron Tucker
Substitutions:
MF	22	(United States) Bella Folino		Substituted on
FW	19	(United States) Addie Gardner		Substituted on
FW	11	(United States) Ellie Maughan		Substituted on
FW	33	(United States) Rachel McCarthy		Substituted on
Head Coach:
(United States) Jennifer Rockwood

College Cup MVP
Offensive:
Defensive: Cristina Roque (Florida State)

Assistant referees:
Rachel Smith (United States)
Kristen Patterson (United States)
Fourth official:
Samantha Martinez (United States)

Match rules:

- 90 minutes.
- 20 minutes of extra time if necessary.
- Penalty shoot-out if scores still level.
- Unlimited substitutes, may not return if subbed out in the first half; may return unlimited times in the second half.

=== Statistics ===
Overall
	Florida State	BYU
Goals scored	0	0
Total shots	5	3
Offsides	0	2
Saves	3	1
Corner kicks	6	2
Fouls	7	9
Yellow cards	1	1
Red cards	0	0
