= Rachel Pace (soccer) =

American soccer player (born 2001)

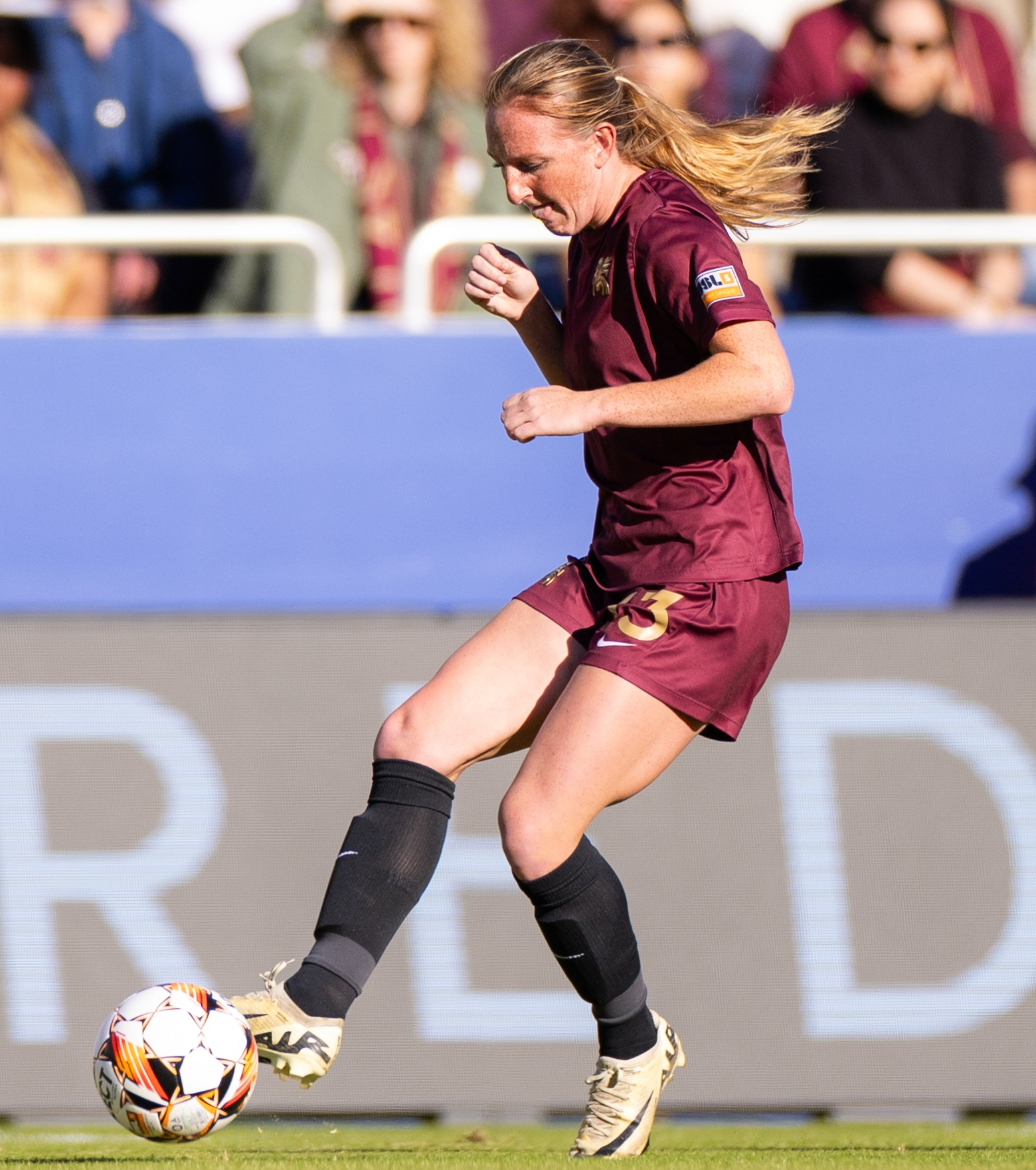
- Pace playing against Brooklyn

Personal information
- Full name: Rachel Anne Pace
- Date of birth: June 10, 2001 (age 25)
- Place of birth: American Fork, Utah, U.S.
- Height: 5 ft 7 in (1.70 m)
- Position: Midfielder

Youth career
- Utah Celtic FC

College career
Years	Team	Apps	(Gls)
2019–2023	BYU Cougars	101	(21)

Senior career*
Years	Team	Apps	(Gls)
2022	Indy Eleven	8	(2)
2024	ETO FC Győr	9	(5)
2024–2025	Dallas Trinity	6	(0)
- * Club domestic league appearances and goals as of December 15, 2024

Rachel Anne Pace (née McCarthy, born June 10, 2001) is an American professional soccer player who plays as midfielder. She played college soccer for the BYU Cougars.

== Early life ==
Pace was born in American Fork, Utah, and attended American Fork High School. In 2017, she and Jamie Shepherd (classmate and future BYU teammate) won the state 6A High School championship. Pace played youth club soccer with Utah Celtic FC, and was part of the team that won the 2019 U19 U.S. Youth Soccer National Championship series, the first Utah team in the competition's history to do so.

== College career ==
=== BYU Cougars ===
Pace attended Brigham Young University, where she played as a midfielder and forward for the Cougars. Over her five seasons at BYU, the Cougars qualified for the NCAA tournament each year, advancing to at least the quarterfinals in three of those seasons.

In total, Pace made 101 appearances for the Cougars, starting in 26 games. Known as a "super-sub" for the energy she brought off the bench, she had a standout moment in a match against top-ranked and defending NCAA champions, UCLA, contributing to BYU's 3–1 upset victory by scoring the team's second goal.

Pace played a key role in helping the Cougars reach the final of the 2021 NCAA Division I Women's Soccer Tournament, where they finished as runners-up.

In 2023, during her final year, BYU transitioned to the Big 12 Conference. Pace helped the Cougars reach the finals of the 2023 Big 12 tournament, where they lost 1–3 to Texas. In the quarterfinals of the 2023 NCAA Division I tournament, Pace came off the bench in the second half, with BYU trailing 3–0 to North Carolina. Her introduction coincided with a dramatic comeback, as BYU scored four goals in the final 29 minutes to secure a 4–3 victory and advance to the College Cup for the second time in program history.

== Club career ==
=== Indy Eleven ===
The Indy Eleven announced that Pace would be joining the club on April 25, 2022, the same day her older sister, Robyn, also joined the club. The 2022 USL W League season was the first season of USL W League. Indy Eleven won the very first game in league history, defeating Kings Hammer FC 3–1 on May 6, 2022. Pace scored the first two goals making her the first player in team and league history with a goal and a brace. Indy Eleven went undefeated in the regular season but lost to Minnesota Aurora FC in the league's playoffs in July 2023.

=== ETO FC Győr ===
After going undrafted in the 2024 NWSL Draft, McCarthy signed with Hungarian side ETO FC Győr in February 2024 for the remainder of the 2023–24 season. She made her professional debut on March 2, 2024 coming on as a substitute in the 55th minute in a 2–0 home victory over Diósgyőri VTK.

On March 6, 2024, Pace scored two goals in the first-half of a Hungarian Women's Cup match against Budapest Honvéd FC, which was also her first professional goal and brace. Pace got her second brace in a league match on May 5, 2024, in a 4–1 home win over Puskás Akadémia FC. On April 25, 2024, she started in the final of the Hungarian Women's Cup, helping Győr secure their third consecutive title.

Győr finished runners-up in the Női NB I league for the third consecutive season, finishing just four points behind league winners, Ferencvárosi TC.

=== Dallas Trinity FC ===
On June 18, 2024, Pace joined Dallas Trinity FC in preparation for the inaugural USL Super League season. Pace made her club debut on November 2, 2024 as a substitute, replacing Allie Thornton in the 88th minute. She got her first start for the club seven days later against Lexington SC. At the end of the season, Pace departed from the Trinity.

== Career statistics ==
=== College summary ===
College team	Season	Regular season			Conference Tournament		NCAA Tournament		Total	
College team	Season	Conference	Apps	Goals	Apps	Goals	Apps	Goals	Apps	Goals
BYU Cougars	2019	WCC	18	1	—		2	0	20	1
BYU Cougars	2020–21	WCC	15	9	—		—		15	9
BYU Cougars	2021	WCC	18	4	—		6	0	24	4
BYU Cougars	2022	WCC	17	1	—		3	1	20	2
BYU Cougars	2023	Big 12	14	5	3	0	5	0	22	5
Total			86	20	3	0	16	1	101	21

=== Club summary ===
As of December 15, 2024

Club	Season	League			League Cup		Playoffs		Total	
Club	Season	Division	Apps	Goals	Apps	Goals	Apps	Goals	Apps	Goals
Indy Eleven	2022	USL W League	8	2	—		0	0	8	2
ETO FC Győr	2023–24	NB I	9	5	3	2	—		12	7
Dallas Trinity FC	2024–25	USL Super League	6	0	—		0	0	6	0
Career total			23	7	3	2	0	0	26	9

== Personal life ==
Pace graduated with a Bachelor's degree in Psychology from BYU in December 2023. She has four siblings. Her older sister, Robyn, also played college soccer at Fresno State.

== Honors ==
Indy Eleven

- Great Lakes Division winners: 2022

ETO FC Győr

- Hungarian Women's Cup: 2024
- Női NB I runner's up: 2024
