= 2023 Big 12 Conference women's soccer tournament =

Collegiate women's soccer tournament

- Classification: Division I
- Teams: 10
- Matches: 9
- Attendance: 1,032
- Site: Mike A. Myers Stadium (Quarterfinals, Semifinals); Round Rock Multipurpose Complex (1st Round, Championship); Austin, Texas (Quarterfinals, Semifinals); Round Rock, Texas (1st Round, Championship)
- Champions: Texas (3rd title)
- Winning coach: Angela Kelly (1st title)
- MVP: Lexi Missimo (Offensive); Mia Justus (Defensive) (Texas)
- Broadcast: ESPN+

2023 Big 12 Conference women's soccer standings
| | Conf. | | | | | | Overall |
| Team | W | | L | | T | PCT | W | | L | | T | PCT |
|---|---|---|---|---|---|---|---|---|---|---|---|---|
| No. 9 Texas Tech ‍†‍‍^{y} | 8 | – | 0 | – | 2 | .900 | 16 | – | 2 | – | 5 | .804 |
| No. 4 BYU ‍‍‍^{y} | 7 | – | 0 | – | 3 | .850 | 20 | – | 3 | – | 3 | .827 |
| TCU ‍‍‍ | 6 | – | 2 | – | 2 | .700 | 10 | – | 6 | – | 3 | .605 |
| No. 18 Texas ‍‍‡‍^{y} | 6 | – | 3 | – | 1 | .650 | 17 | – | 5 | – | 2 | .750 |
| West Virginia ‍‍‍ | 5 | – | 3 | – | 2 | .600 | 7 | – | 8 | – | 4 | .474 |
| UCF ‍‍‍ | 5 | – | 4 | – | 1 | .550 | 10 | – | 7 | – | 1 | .583 |
| Oklahoma State ‍‍‍ | 5 | – | 5 | – | 0 | .500 | 12 | – | 8 | – | 0 | .600 |
| Baylor ‍‍‍ | 4 | – | 4 | – | 2 | .500 | 9 | – | 7 | – | 3 | .553 |
| Cincinnati ‍‍‍ | 2 | – | 3 | – | 5 | .450 | 4 | – | 8 | – | 7 | .395 |
| Oklahoma ‍‍‍ | 3 | – | 5 | – | 2 | .400 | 8 | – | 10 | – | 2 | .450 |
| Iowa State ‍‍‍ | 3 | – | 7 | – | 0 | .300 | 6 | – | 11 | – | 1 | .361 |
| Houston ‍‍‍ | 2 | – | 7 | – | 1 | .250 | 8 | – | 8 | – | 2 | .500 |
| Kansas ‍‍‍ | 1 | – | 7 | – | 2 | .200 | 4 | – | 8 | – | 6 | .389 |
| Kansas State ‍‍‍ | 1 | – | 8 | – | 1 | .150 | 3 | – | 12 | – | 3 | .250 |
† – Conference champion ‡ – 2023 Big 12 Tournament champion y – Invited to the NCAA Tournament; As of December 5, 2023; Rankings from United Soccer Coaches Poll; Source: The Big 12 Conference

The 2023 Big 12 Conference women's soccer tournament was the postseason women's soccer tournament for the Big 12 Conference held from October 28 to November 4, 2023. The 9-match tournament was scheduled to be held at the Round Rock Multipurpose Complex in Round Rock, Texas. However a large amount of rain caused the field to be unavailable for the Quarterfinals and Semifinals, leading those rounds to instead be moved to Mike A. Myers Stadium in Austin, Texas. The move in venue caused the Big 12 to have to refund all quarterfinal and semifinal round tickets. Admission was made free in Austin, so no attendance count was made, though fans coming still had to pay parking prices.

The 10-team single-elimination tournament consisted of four rounds based on seeding from regular season conference play. The West Virginia Mountaineers were the defending champions in 2022.

Texas won the title by defeating newcomer BYU 3–1 in the final. This was the third title in school history for Texas, their first since winning back-to-back in 2006 & 2007, and the first for head coach Angela Kelly. As tournament champions, Texas earned the Big 12's automatic berth into the 2023 NCAA Division I Women's Soccer Tournament. It was Texas' final Big 12 Women's Soccer Championship as the team will move to the SEC in 2024.

== Seeding ==
The top ten teams in regular season play qualified for the tournament. One tiebreaker was used to determine the 9th and 10th seeds. Head-to-head between Oklahoma and Cincinnati was a tie at 0–0. However Cincinnati won the 9-seed with points earned against common opponents: 7–4.

| Seed | School | Conference Record | Points |
|---|---|---|---|
| 1 | Texas Tech | 8–0–2 | 26 |
| 2 | BYU | 7–0–3 | 24 |
| 3 | TCU | 6–2–2 | 20 |
| 4 | Texas | 6–3–1 | 19 |
| 5 | West Virginia | 5–3–2 | 17 |
| 6 | UCF | 5–4–1 | 16 |
| 7 | Oklahoma State | 5–5–0 | 15 |
| 8 | Baylor | 4–4–2 | 14 |
| 9 | Cincinnati | 2–3–5 | 11 |
| 10 | Oklahoma | 3–5–2 | 11 |

== Bracket ==
1st Round; Saturday, Oct. 28
8 | Baylor | 2
9 | Cincinnati | 3
7 | Oklahoma State | 0
10 | Oklahoma | 1

Quarterfinals; Monday, Oct. 30
1 | Texas Tech | 2
9 | Cincinnati | 1
4 | Texas | 3
5 | West Virginia | 1
2 | BYU | 6
10 | Oklahoma | 0
3 | TCU | 2
6 | UCF | 3

Semifinals; Wednesday, Nov. 1
1 | Texas Tech | 0
4 | Texas | 1
2 | BYU | 4
6 | UCF | 1

Final; Saturday, Nov. 4
4 | Texas | 3
2 | BYU | 1

== Schedule ==
=== 1st Round ===
| October 28, 2023 | #8 Baylor | 2–3 | #9 Cincinnati | Round Rock, TX |
| 1:00 p.m. | Hannah Augustyn 69'; Ashley Merrill 83' | Report | 11' Fran Stables; 50' Emma Gioffre; 83' Kendall Battle | Stadium: Round Rock Multipurpose Complex; Attendance: N/A; Referee: Travis Haight; Assistant referees: Jennifer Dumaine; Santiago Roa; Fourth official: William Hale |
| | Penalties |
| | Blythe Obar (yellow card) 32'; Ashley Merrill (yellow card) 51' |

| October 28, 2023 | #7 Oklahoma State | 0–1 | #10 Oklahoma | Round Rock, TX |
| 3:30 p.m. | | Report | 76' Esalenna Galekhutle | Stadium: Round Rock Multipurpose Complex; Attendance: N/A; Referee: Richonne Clark; Assistant referees: Karsten Gillwald; Joshua Ell; Fourth official: Travis Haight |
| | Penalties |
| | Adelhia Ghonda (yellow card) 57' | | (yellow card) 57' Cailey England |

=== Quarterfinals ===
| October 30, 2023 | #4 Texas | 3–1 | #5 West Virginia | Austin, TX |
| 11:30 a.m. | Lexi Missimo 9', 39'; Trinity Byars 14'; Trinity Byars (yellow card) 66' | Report | (yellow card) 31' Dilary Heredia-Beltrán; 57' Dilary Heredia-Beltran | Stadium: Mike A. Myers Stadium; Attendance: 283; Referee: Brandon Gardner; Assistant referees: Trevor Rappleye; Laura Chambers; Fourth official: Austin Saini |

| October 30, 2023 | #1 Texas Tech | 2–1 | #9 Cincinnati | Austin, TX |
| 2:00 p.m. | Hannah Anderson 13'; Team (yellow card) 67'; Team (yellow card) 67'; Team (yellow card) 67'; Gisselle Kozarski 89' | Report | 85' Laura Zemberyova | Stadium: Mike A. Myers Stadium; Attendance: N/A; Referee: Servando Berna; Assistant referees: Karsten Gillwald; Chana Forstall; Fourth official: Elvis Osmanovic |

| October 30, 2023 | #2 BYU | 6–0 | #10 Oklahoma | Austin, TX |
| 5:30 p.m. | Bella Folino 9', 61'; Allie Fryer 50'; Olivia Katoa 68'; Ellie Boren (yellow card) 69'; Erin Bailey 83'; Ellie Walbruch 89' | Report | (yellow card) 69' Hadley Murrell | Stadium: Mike A. Myers Stadium; Attendance: N/A; Referee: Austin Saini; Assistant referees: Laura Chambers; Janae Thompson; Fourth official: Brandon Gardner |

| October 30, 2023 | #3 TCU | 2–3 | #6 UCF | Austin, TX |
| 8:00 p.m. | Gracie Brian 6'; Maddie Mooney 73' | Report | 53' Mia Asenjo; 66' Dayana Martin; 82' Chloe Netzel | Stadium: Mike A. Myers Stadium; Attendance: N/A; Referee: Elvis Osmanovic; Assistant referees: Chana Forstall; Karsten Gillwald; Fourth official: Servando Berna |

=== Semifinals ===
| November 1, 2023 | #1 Texas Tech | 0–1 | #4 Texas | Austin, TX |
| 4:30 p.m. | | Report | 50' Trinity Byars; (yellow card) 88' Lexi Missimo | Stadium: Mike A. Myers Stadium; Attendance: N/A; Referee: Dimitar Chavdarov; Assistant referees: Laura Chambers; Santiago Roa; Fourth official: William Hale |

| November 1, 2023 | #2 BYU | 4–1 | #6 UCF | Austin, TX |
| 7:00 p.m. | Olivia Katoa 28', 34'; Brecken Mozingo 39'; Ellie Walbruch 44' | Report | (yellow card) 29' Audrey Bucks; 79' Katie Bradley | Stadium: Mike A. Myers Stadium; Attendance: N/A |

=== Final ===
| November 4, 2023 | #2 BYU | 1–3 | #4 Texas | Round Rock, TX |
| 1:00 p.m. | Brecken Mozingo 8' | Report | 2', 55' Lexi Missimo; (yellow card) 68' Breana Thompson; 76' Holly Ward | Stadium: Round Rock Multipurpose Complex; Attendance: 1,032; Referee: Corey Rockwell; Assistant referees: Jarred Mosher; Maggi Short; Fourth official: Arturo Ibarra |

== Statistics ==
=== Goalscorers ===
There were 34 goals scored in 9 matches, for an average of 3.78 goals per match (as of November 25, 2023).

4 goals

- Lexi Missimo – Texas

3 goals

- Olivia Katoa – BYU

2 goals

- Bella Folino – BYU
- Brecken Mozingo – BYU
- Ellie Walbruch – BYU
- Trinity Byars – Texas

1 goal

- Ashley Merrill – Baylor
- Hannah Augustyn – Baylor
- Allie Fryer – BYU
- Erin Bailey – BYU
- Fran Stables – Cincinnati
- Emma Gioffre – Cincinnati
- Kendall Battle – Cincinnati
- Laura Zemberyova – Cincinnati
- Esalenna Galekhutle – Oklahoma
- Gracie Brian – TCU
- Maddie Mooney – TCU
- Holly Ward – Texas
- Hannah Anderson – Texas Tech
- Gisselle Kozarski – Texas Tech
- Chloe Netzel – UCF
- Dayana Martin – UCF
- Katie Bradley – UCF
- Mia Asenjo – UCF
- Dilary Heredia-Beltrán – West Virginia

== All-Tournament team ==
| Position | Player | Team |
|---|---|---|
| GK | Mia Justus^ | Texas |
| DF | Kendell Petersen | BYU |
| DF | Lauren Lapomarda | Texas |
| DF | Hannah Anderson | Texas Tech |
| MF | Brecken Mozingo | BYU |
| MF | Olivia Wade-Katoa | BYU |
| MF | Lexi Missimo* | Texas |
| FW | Ellie Walbruch | BYU |
| FW | Chloe Netzel | UCF |
| FW | Trinity Byars | Texas |
| FW | Holly Ward | Texas |

* Offensive MVP
^ Defensive MVP
