= Rachel Pace =

Rachel Pace may refer to:

- Rachel Pace (actress) (born 2000), American actress
- Rachel Pace (soccer) (born 2001), American soccer player
