= Lauren Lapomarda =

American soccer player (born 2002)

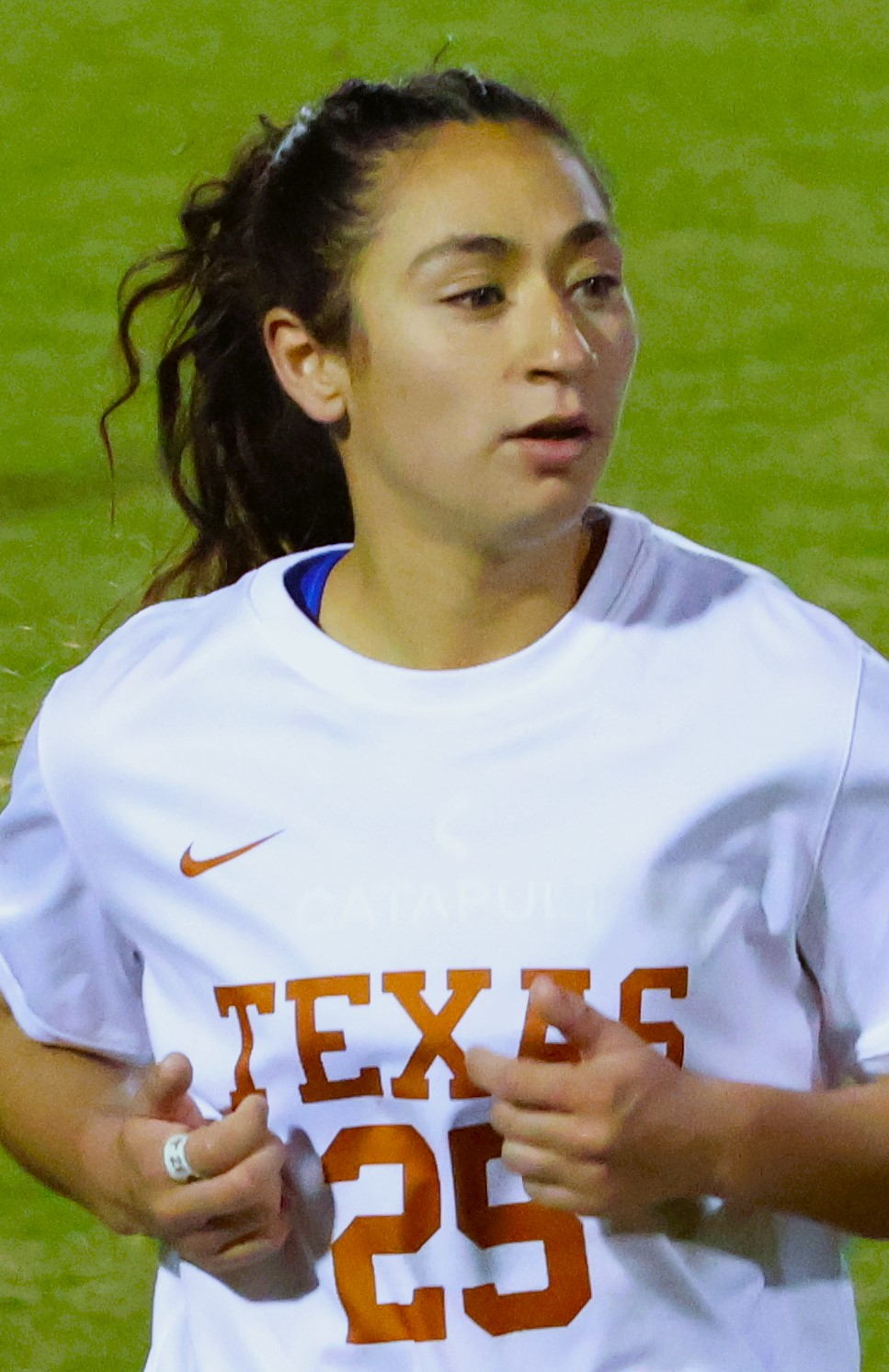
- Lapomarda with Texas in 2024

Personal information
- Full name: Lauren Adrienne Lapomarda
- Date of birth: May 10, 2002 (age 24)
- Height: 5 ft 2 in (1.57 m)
- Position: Defender

Team information
- Current team: Þór/KA

Youth career
- Solar SC

College career
| Years | Team | Apps | (Gls) |
| 2020–2024 | Texas Longhorns | 102 | (4) |

Senior career*
| Years | Team | Apps | (Gls) |
| 2025 | Parma | 1 | (0) |
| 2025–2026 | Dallas Trinity | 0 | (0) |
| 2026– | Þór/KA | 0 | (0) |
- * Club domestic league appearances and goals as of 22:36, June 4, 2026 (UTC)

Lauren Adrienne Lapomarda (born May 10, 2002) is an American professional soccer player who plays as a defender for Besta deild kvenna club Þór/KA. She played college soccer for the Texas Longhorns, setting the program record for career appearances.

== Early life ==
Lapomarda grew up in the Dallas suburb of Prosper, Texas, the younger of two children born to Larry Lapomarda and Adriana Lazo. She is of Italian and Mexican descent and holds American, Italian and Mexican citizenship. Her sister, Katie, played college soccer at San Diego. Lapomarda began playing soccer at age three. She played prep soccer at Prosper High School and club soccer for Solar SC. She won the USSDA under-16/17 national championship in 2019, with her club team led by her future Texas teammates Lexi Missimo and Trinity Byars.

== College career ==
Lapomarda played five seasons for the Texas Longhorns, making a program-record 102 appearances (97 starts) and scoring 4 goals between 2020 and 2024. In her senior season, she contributed to a program-record stretch of more than six games without conceding a goal. She then helped Texas win the 2023 Big Ten tournament, being named to the all-tournament team after assisting Trinity Byars in a 1–0 semifinal win over Texas Tech and defeating BYU 3–1 in the final. In her fifth season, she was given freedom to contribute more offensively and doubled her career scoring output with two goals and five assists. She also helped lead Texas to victory in the 2024 SEC tournament (in their first season in the conference), scoring a golden goal in a 2–1 semifinal win against Arkansas to advance to the final, where they beat South Carolina 1–0.

== Club career ==
Serie B club Parma announced on January 18, 2025, that the club had signed Lapomarda to her first professional deal. She made one appearance as the Gialloblu secured promotion to Serie A.

In July 2025, Lapomarda moved to hometown USL Super League club Dallas Trinity. Nearly a year later, on May 23, 2026, she made her club debut in the playoff semifinals against Lexington SC, playing the last few moments in a 2–0 loss. Lapomarda departed from Dallas at the end of the season.

On 15 August 2026, it was announced that Lapomarda had signed a contract with Icelandic club Þór/KA through the remainder of the Besta deild kvenna season.

== Honors ==
Texas Longhorns

- Big 12 Conference tournament: 2023
- SEC tournament: 2024
