= 2023 NCAA Division I women's soccer rankings =

- Season: 2023
- NCAA tournament: 2023
- Preseason No. 1: UCLA
- NCAA Tournament Champions: Florida State
NCAA Division I women's soccer rankings


Two major human polls made up the 2023 NCAA Division I women's soccer rankings: United Soccer Coaches and Top Drawer Soccer.

== Legend ==
	Increase in ranking
	Decrease in ranking
	New to rankings from previous week
Italics	Number of first place votes
(#–#)	Win-loss record
т	Tied with team above or below also with this symbol

== United Soccer Coaches ==
	Preseason Aug 1	Week 1 Aug 22	Week 2 Aug 29	Week 3 Sep 5	Week 4 Sep 12	Week 5 Sep 19	Week 6 Sep 26	Week 7 Oct 3	Week 8 Oct 10	Week 9 Oct 17	Week 10 Oct 24	Week 11 Oct 31	Final Dec 5	
1.	UCLA (8)	UCLA (1–0–0) (8)	UCLA (3–0–0) (8)	BYU (6–0–0) (8)	BYU (7–0–0) (8)	North Carolina (6–0–3) (7)	North Carolina (7–0–4) (8)	North Carolina (8–0–4) (8)	Florida State (10–0–1) (8)	Florida State (11–0–1) (7)	Florida State (13–0–1) (8)	Florida State (14–0–1) (8)	Florida State (22–0–1) (8)	1.
2.	North Carolina	Florida State (2–0–0)	Florida State (2–0–0)	Stanford (5–0–0)	North Carolina (5–0–3)	Stanford (7–0–1)	Florida State (7–0–1)	Florida State (8–0–1)	Stanford (12–0–1)	UCLA (12–1–0)	UCLA (14–1–0)	UCLA (15–1–1)	Stanford (20–1–4)	2.
3.	Notre Dame	North Carolina (1–0–1)	Stanford (4–0–0)	North Carolina (4–0–2)	Stanford (6–0–1)	Florida State (6–0–0) (1)	Stanford (8–0–1)	Stanford (10–0–1)	North Carolina (9–0–5)	North Carolina (9–0–6)	North Carolina (10–0–7)	Stanford (14–0–4)	Clemson (18–4–4)	3.
4.	Duke	Duke (1–0–0)	North Carolina (2–0–2)	UCLA (3–1–0)	Florida State (5–0–0)	Penn State (7–0–1)	Penn State (9–0–1)	Penn State (10–0–2)	Penn State (11–0–2)	Penn State (11–0–4) (1)	Stanford (14–0–2)	Texas Tech (15–0–4)	BYU (20–3–3)	4.
5.	Virginia	Virginia (2–0–0)	Alabama (4–0–0)	Florida State (3–0–0)	UCLA (5–1–0)	UCLA (6–1–0)	UCLA (7–1–0)	UCLA (9–1–0)	UCLA (11–1–0)	Stanford (12–0–2)	Texas Tech (14–0–4)	Penn State (13–1–4)	Penn State (16–3–4)	5.
6.	Florida State	Stanford (2–0–0)	Penn State (3–0–1)	Penn State (5–0–1)	Penn State (6–0–1)	BYU (7–1–1)	BYU (9–1–1)	Arkansas (8–2–1)	Texas Tech (12–0–3)	Texas Tech (13–0–4)	Penn State (12–1–4)	BYU (15–1–3)	Pittsburgh (17–6–1)	6.
7.	Alabama	Alabama (2–0–0)	BYU (4–0–0)	Arkansas (3–1–1)	Alabama (5–0–3)	South Carolina (7–1–1)	Arkansas (7–2–1)	Texas Tech (11–0–2)т	Clemson (10–1–3)	BYU (13–1–3)	BYU (14–1–3)	Clemson (14–2–3)	Nebraska (17–4–3)	7.
8.	Arkansas	Penn State (1–0–1)	Arkansas (2–0–1)т	Santa Clara (6–0–0)	Clemson (6–0–2)	Clemson (6–1–2)	Clemson (8–1–2)	BYU (10–1–2)т	BYU (11–1–3)	Clemson (11–1–3)	Clemson (13–1–3)	Memphis (15–1–0)	North Carolina (13–2–8)	8.
9.	TCU	Texas (2–0–0)	Santa Clara (4–0–0)т	Clemson (5–0–1)	South Carolina (6–1–1)	Alabama (6–0–4)	Alabama (7–1–4)	Clemson (9–1–2)	Memphis (10–1–0)	Arkansas (10–3–1)	Memphis (14–1–0)	Notre Dame (11–2–4)	Texas Tech (16–2–5)	9.
10.	Penn State	Arkansas (1–0–0)	Duke (2–1–0)	South Carolina (5–0–1)	Georgetown (4–0–3)	Notre Dame (5–1–2)	Notre Dame (6–1–3)	Memphis (9–1–0)	Arkansas (9–3–1)	Memphis (12–1–0)	Arkansas (11–3–2)	Arkansas (12–3–2)	Memphis (20–2–0)	10.
11.	Stanford	BYU (2–0–0)	Clemson (3–0–1)	Notre Dame (3–0–2)	Arkansas (3–2–1)	Arkansas (5–2–1)	Georgetown (6–1–3)	Notre Dame (7–1–3)	Notre Dame (9–1–3)	USC (9–2–1)	Notre Dame (10–2–4)	Pittsburgh (14–4–1)	Saint Louis (19–3–2)	11.
12.	South Carolina	Notre Dame (1–0–1)	Virginia (3–0–1)	Alabama (4–0–2)	Santa Clara (6–0–2)	Memphis (7–1–0)	Memphis (8–1–0)	Georgetown (7–1–4)	Wisconsin (9–2–3)	Notre Dame (9–2–3)	Michigan State (12–3–3)	Wisconsin (12–3–4)	Michigan State (14–5–3)	12.
13.	BYU	Santa Clara (2–0–0)	South Carolina (3–0–1)	Georgetown (3–0–1)	Notre Dame (4–1–2)	Santa Clara (6–1–2)	Princeton (6–1–1)	South Carolina (8–1–3)	USC (9–2–0)	Santa Clara (10–2–2)	South Carolina (11–1–5)	North Carolina (10–1–8)	Georgia (13–4–6)	13.
14.	Pittsburgh	Michigan State (2–0–0)	Georgetown (3–0–1)	Duke (2–2–0)	Memphis (5–1–0)	Texas (7–1–1)т	Texas Tech (9–0–2)	Michigan (7–2–3)	Santa Clara (9–2–2)	Michigan State (10–3–3)	Brown (10–1–2)	Brown (11–1–2)	Mississippi State (12–6–5)	14.
15.	Texas	South Carolina (1–0–1)	Notre Dame (2–0–2)	Washington State (5–0–0)	Duke (4–2–0)	Princeton (5–1–1)т	South Carolina (7–1–3)	USC (7–2–0)	South Carolina (9–1–4)	Brown (9–1–2)	Santa Clara (11–3–2)	Nebraska (14–2–3)	UCLA (16–2–1)	15.
16.	Georgetown	TCU (1–1–0)	Memphis (3–1–0)	Memphis (4–1–0)	Texas (6–1–1)	Duke (5–2–0)	Indiana (9–0–2)	Santa Clara (8–2–2)	Brown (8–1–2)	Alabama (9–3–4)	Wisconsin (12–3–3)	South Carolina (11–1–6)	Notre Dame (12–4–4)	16.
17.	Michigan State	Memphis (2–0–0)т	Washington State (4–0–0)	Texas (5–0–1)	Xavier (6–1–0)	Georgetown (4–1–3)	Duke (5–3–1)	Wake Forest (8–1–2)	Pittsburgh (11–2–1)	South Carolina (9–1–5)	Xavier (12–2–4)	Xavier (13–2–4)	Arkansas (15–5–2)	17.
18.	Northwestern	Xavier (2–0–0)т	Texas (3–1–0)	Virginia (5–0–1)	Northwestern (6–0–2)	Northwestern (7–0–2)	Santa Clara (7–2–2)	Kentucky (7–0–4)	Kentucky (8–0–5)	Pittsburgh (12–2–1)	Arizona State (10–3–4)	Mississippi State (10–4–4)	Texas (17–5–2)	18.
19.	Santa Clara	Clemson (1–0–1)	USC (2–1–0)	USC (3–1–0)	Michigan (4–1–2)	Michigan (5–1–2)	USC (5–2–0)	Alabama (7–2–4)	Xavier (10–2–3)	Indiana (11–1–4)	Nebraska (13–2–3)	Gonzaga (12–3–1)	Wisconsin (14–5–4)	19.
20.	Memphis	Georgetown (1–0–1)	Northwestern (3–0–1)	Northwestern (4–0–2)	Virginia (5–0–2)	Colorado (8–1–0)	UCF (7–2–0)	Wisconsin (8–2–3)	Michigan State (9–3–2)	Xavier (11–2–3)	Pittsburgh (12–4–1)	Michigan State (12–4–3)	UC Irvine (10–8–6)	20.
21.	Saint Louis	Pittsburgh (2–0–0)	Pittsburgh (4–0–0)	Xavier (4–1–0)	Gonzaga (6–1–1)	Gonzaga (7–1–1)	Texas (7–3–1)	Brown (6–1–2)	TCU (9–4–2)	Wisconsin (10–3–3)	Mississippi State (10–3–4)	Saint Louis (15–2–2)	South Carolina (12–3–6)	21.
22.	USC	UCF (1–0–0)	Georgia (1–1–0)	Pittsburgh (6–0–0)	Colorado (7–1–0)	Virginia (5–0–3)т	Michigan (6–2–2)	Duke (5–3–2)	Georgetown (7–1–6)	Saint Louis (12–2–2)	Saint Louis (14–2–2)	USC (10–3–3)	Alabama (12–5–5)	22.
23.	Harvard	Washington State (2–0–0)	Saint Louis (3–1–0)	Gonzaga (5–1–0)	Georgia (3–1–2)	Georgia (4–1–3)т	Washington State (7–2–0)	TCU (8–3–2)	Duke (5–4–3)	Kentucky (8–1–5)	USC (9–3–2)	Santa Clara (11–4–2)	Santa Clara (14–5–2)	23.
24.	UCF	USC (1–0–0)	Gonzaga (3–1–0)	Nebraska (5–0–1)	Washington State (6–1–0)т	Washington State (7–1–0)	Xavier (8–2–1)	Saint Louis (9–2–2)	Alabama (8–3–4)	Arizona State (9–2–4)	Indiana (12–2–4)	Alabama (11–4–4)	Iowa (13–5–4)	24.
25.	Clemson	Tennessee (2–0–0)	Xavier (3–1–0)	TCU (2–2–1)	Saint Louis (5–2–1)т	Texas Tech (7–0–2)	Wake Forest (7–1–2)	Colorado (10–2–0)	Indiana (10–1–3)	Nebraska (11–2–3)	Alabama (10–4–4) т; Duke (6–6–3) т	Wake Forest (10–3–5)	USC (11–5–3)	25.
	Preseason Aug 1	Week 1 Aug 22	Week 2 Aug 29	Week 3 Sep 5	Week 4 Sep 12	Week 5 Sep 19	Week 6 Sep 26	Week 7 Oct 3	Week 8 Oct 10	Week 9 Oct 17	Week 10 Oct 24	Week 11 Oct 31	Final Dec 5	
		Dropped: No. 18 Northwestern; No. 21 Saint Louis; No. 23 Harvard	Dropped: No. 14 Michigan State; No. 16 TCU; No. 22 UCF; No. 25 Tennessee	Dropped: No. 22 Georgia; No. 23 Saint Louis	Dropped: No. 19 USC; No. 22 Pittsburgh; No. 24 Nebraska; No. 25 TCU	Dropped: No. 17 Xavier; No. 24т Saint Louis	Dropped: No. 18 Northwestern; No. 20 Colorado; No. 21 Gonzaga; No. 22т Georgia; No. 22т Virginia	Dropped: No. 13 Princeton; No. 16 Indiana; No. 20 UCF; No. 21 Texas; No. 23 Washington State; No. 24 Xavier	Dropped: No. 14 Michigan; No. 17 Wake Forest; No. 24 Saint Louis; No. 25 Colorado	Dropped: No. 21 TCU; No. 22 Georgetown; No. 23 Duke	Dropped: No. 23 Kentucky	Dropped: No. 18 Arizona State; No. 24 Indiana; No. 25т Duke	Dropped: No. 14 Brown; No. 17 Xavier; No. 19 Gonzaga; No. 25 Wake Forest	

== Top Drawer Soccer ==
	Preseason Aug 15	Week 1 Aug 21	Week 2 Aug 28	Week 3 Sep 4	Week 4 Sep 11	Week 5 Sep 18	Week 6 Sep 25	Week 7 Oct 2	Week 8 Oct 9	Week 9 Oct 16	Week 10 Oct 23	Week 11 Oct 30	Week 12 Nov 6	Week 13 Nov 13	Week 14 Nov 20	Week 15 Nov 27	Final Dec 5	
1.	UCLA	UCLA (1–0–0)	UCLA (3–0–0)	Florida State (3–0–0)	Florida State (5–0–0)	Florida State (6–0–0)	Florida State (7–0–1)	Florida State (8–0–1)	Florida State (10–0–1)	Florida State (11–0–1)	Florida State (13–0–1)	Florida State (14–0–1)	Florida State (16–0–1)	Florida State (17–0–1)	Florida State (19–0–1)	Florida State (20–0–1)	Florida State (22–0–1)	1.
2.	North Carolina	Florida State (2–0–0)	Florida State (2–0–0)	Stanford (5–0–0)	BYU (7–0–0)	Penn State (7–0–1)	North Carolina (7–0–4)	North Carolina (8–0–4)	UCLA (11–1–0)	UCLA (12–1–0)	UCLA (14–1–0)	UCLA (15–1–1)	UCLA (16–1–1)	Stanford (16–0–4)	Stanford (18–0–4)	Stanford (19–0–4)	Stanford (20–1–4)	2.
3.	Florida State	North Carolina (1–0–1)	Stanford (4–0–0)	BYU (6–0–0)	Penn State (6–0–1)	North Carolina (6–0–3)	Penn State (9–0–1)	UCLA (9–1–0)	Stanford (12–0–1)	Memphis (12–1–0)	Memphis (14–1–0)	Memphis (15–1–0)	Stanford (15–0–4)	Memphis (19–1–0)	Clemson (17–3–4)	Clemson (18–3–4)	Clemson (18–4–4)	3.
4.	Stanford	Stanford (2–0–0)	Penn State (3–0–1)	Penn State (5–0–1)	North Carolina (5–0–3)	UCLA (6–1–0)	UCLA (7–1–0)	Stanford (10–0–1)	North Carolina (9–0–5)	BYU (12–1–3)	BYU (13–1–3)	BYU (14–1–3)	Memphis (18–1–0)	Clemson (16–3–3)	BYU (19–2–3)	BYU (20–2–3)	BYU (20–3–3)	4.
5.	Penn State	Penn State (1–0–1)	North Carolina (2–0–2)	North Carolina (4–0–2)	UCLA (5–1–0)	Stanford (7–0–1)	Stanford (8–0–1)	Penn State (10–0–2)	Penn State (11–0–2)	Stanford (12–0–2)	Stanford (14–0–2)	Stanford (14–0–4)	Clemson (15–3–3)	Saint Louis (18–2–2)	Pittsburgh (17–5–1)	Pittsburgh (17–6–1)	Pittsburgh (17–6–1)	5.
6.	Virginia	Virginia (2–0–0)	Alabama (4–0–0)	UCLA (3–1–0)	Stanford (6–0–1)	BYU (7–1–1)	BYU (8–1–1)	Arkansas (8–2–1)	Memphis (10–1–0)	USC (9–2–1)	Clemson (13–1–3)	Notre Dame (11–2–4)	Saint Louis (17–2–2)	Notre Dame (12–3–4)	North Carolina (13–1–8)	North Carolina (13–2–8)	North Carolina (13–2–8)	6.
7.	Notre Dame	Duke (1–0–0)	Virginia (3–0–1)	Virginia (5–0–1)	Alabama (5–0–3)	Duke (5–2–0)	Arkansas (7–2–1)	Memphis (9–1–0)	USC (9–2–0)	North Carolina (9–0–6)	Texas Tech (13–0–4)	Texas Tech (14–0–4)	Notre Dame (11–3–4)	BYU (17–2–3)	Penn State (16–2–4)	Penn State (16–3–4)	Penn State (16–3–4)	7.
8.	Duke	Alabama (2–0–0)	Arkansas (2–0–1)	Notre Dame (3–0–2)	Duke (3–2–0)	South Carolina (7–1–1)	Memphis (8–1–0)	Clemson (9–1–2)	BYU (10–1–3)	Penn State (11–0–4)	North Carolina (10–0–7)	Penn State (13–1–4)	BYU (16–2–3)	Pittsburgh (15–5–1)	Nebraska (17–3–3)	Nebraska (17–4–3)	Nebraska (17–4–3)	8.
9.	Alabama	Arkansas (2–0–0)	BYU (4–0–0)	South Carolina (5–0–1)	South Carolina (6–1–1)	Memphis (7–1–0)	Clemson (8–1–2)	USC (7–2–0)	Texas Tech (12–0–3)	Pittsburgh (12–2–1)	Notre Dame (10–2–4)	Clemson (14–2–3)	Pittsburgh (14–5–1)	Harvard (13–3–2)	Memphis (20–2–0)	Memphis (20–2–0)	Memphis (20–2–0)	9.
10.	Arkansas	Notre Dame (1–0–1)	Duke (2–1–0)	Arkansas (3–1–1)	Virginia (5–0–2)	Alabama (6–0–4)	USC (5–2–0)	BYU (9–1–2)	Notre Dame (9–1–3)	Clemson (11–1–3)	Penn State (12–1–4)	Pittsburgh (14–4–1)	Harvard (12–3–2)	Texas Tech (16–1–4)	Saint Louis (19–3–2)	Saint Louis (19–3–2)	Saint Louis (19–3–2)	10.
11.	South Carolina	BYU (2–0–0)	Notre Dame (2–0–2)	Pittsburgh (6–0–0)	Georgetown (4–0–3)	Pittsburgh (8–1–0)	Notre Dame (6–1–3)	Notre Dame (7–1–3)	Pittsburgh (11–2–1)	Texas Tech (13–0–4)	Saint Louis (14–2–2)	Saint Louis (15–2–2)	Texas Tech (15–1–4)	North Carolina (11–1–8)	Texas Tech (16–2–5)	Texas Tech (16–2–5)	Texas Tech (16–2–5)	11.
12.	BYU	Texas (2–0–0)	South Carolina (3–0–1)	Duke (2–2–0)	Xavier (6–1–0)	Notre Dame (5–1–2)	Georgetown (6–1–3)	South Carolina (8–1–3)	Clemson (10–1–3)	Notre Dame (9–2–3)	Brown (10–1–2)	Brown (11–1–2)	North Carolina (10–1–8)	Texas (16–4–2)	Texas (17–5–2)	Texas (17–5–2)	Texas (17–5–2)	12.
13.	Texas	South Carolina (1–0–1)	Pittsburgh (4–0–0)	Santa Clara (6–0–0)	Memphis (5–1–0)	Arkansas (5–2–1)	Alabama (7–1–4)	Texas Tech (11–0–2)	Arkansas (9–3–1)	Arkansas (10–3–1)	Pittsburgh (12–4–1)	USC (10–3–3)	Texas (15–4–2)	USC (11–4–3)	Georgia (13–4–6)	Georgia (13–4–6)	Georgia (13–4–6)	13.
14.	TCU	Pittsburgh (2–0–0)	Saint Louis (3–1–0)	Georgetown (3–0–1)	Clemson (6–0–2)	Saint Louis (7–2–1)	South Carolina (7–1–3)	Pittsburgh (9–2–1)	Saint Louis (10–2–2)	Saint Louis (12–2–2)	USC (9–3–2)	North Carolina (10–1–8)	USC (10–4–3)	Georgia (12–4–5)	Mississippi State (12–6–5)	Mississippi State (12–6–5)	Mississippi State (12–6–5)	14.
15.	Pittsburgh	TCU (1–1–0)	TCU (1–2–0)	Alabama (4–0–2)	Pittsburgh (7–1–0)	Virginia (5–0–3)	Princeton (6–1–1)	Colorado (10–2–0)	Brown (8–1–2)	Brown (9–1–2)	Nebraska (13–2–3)	Nebraska (14–2–3)	Georgia (11–4–5)	Brown (12–2–2)	Michigan State (14–5–3)	Michigan State (14–5–3)	Michigan State (14–5–3)	15.
16.	Northwestern	Michigan State (2–0–0)	Brown (2–0–0)	USC (3–1–0)	Notre Dame (4–1–2)	Clemson (6–1–2)	Texas Tech (9–0–2)	Georgetown (7–1–4)	South Carolina (9–1–4)	Nebraska (11–2–3)	Michigan State (12–3–3)	Arkansas (12–3–2)	Brown (11–2–2)	Iowa (13–4–4)	UC Irvine (10–8–6)	UC Irvine (10–8–6)	UC Irvine (10–8–6)	16.
17.	Saint Louis	Saint Louis (1–1–0)	Santa Clara (4–0–0)	Memphis (4–1–0)	Arkansas (3–2–1)	Texas (7–1–1)	Indiana (9–0–2)	Alabama (7–2–4)	Michigan State (9–3–2)	Santa Clara (10–2–2)	Wisconsin (12–3–3)	Wisconsin (12–3–4)	Iowa (12–4–4)	Georgetown (13–1–7)	Notre Dame (12–4–4)	Notre Dame (12–4–4)	Notre Dame (12–4–4)	17.
18.	Brown	Brown (0–0–0)	Georgetown (3–0–1)	Texas (5–1–0)	Saint Louis (5–2–1)	USC (4–2–0)	Pittsburgh (8–2–1)	Michigan (7–2–3)	Wisconsin (9–2–3)	Colorado (10–3–2)	Arkansas (11–3–2)	South Alabama (15–0–3)	Georgetown (12–1–7)	Arkansas (15–4–2)	Harvard (13–4–2)	Harvard (13–4–2)	Harvard (13–4–2)	18.
19.	Michigan State	Santa Clara (2–0–0)	USC (2–1–0)	Xavier (4–1–0)	Santa Clara (6–0–2)	Santa Clara (6–1–2)	Duke (5–3–1)	Saint Louis (9–2–2)	Nebraska (9–2–3)	Indiana (11–1–4)	Arizona State (10–3–4)	Harvard (10–3–2)	Arkansas (14–4–2)	Penn State (14–2–4)	USC (11–5–3)	USC (11–5–3)	USC (11–5–3)	19.
20.	Georgetown	Georgetown (1–0–1)	Memphis (3–1–0)	TCU (2–2–1)	USC (3–2–0)	Georgetown (4–1–3)	Colorado (8–2–0)	Brown (6–1–2)	Santa Clara (9–2–2)	Michigan State (10–3–3)	South Carolina (11–1–5)	Xavier (13–2–4)	Penn State (13–2–4)	Wisconsin (14–4–4)	Brown (12–3–2)	Brown (12–3–2)	Brown (12–3–2)	20.
21.	Santa Clara	Northwestern (1–0–1)	Texas (3–1–0)	Saint Louis (4–2–0)	Brown (3–1–1)	Colorado (8–1–0)	Texas (7–2–1)	Michigan State (8–3–2)	Colorado (10–3–1)	South Carolina (9–1–5)	Indiana (12–2–4)	Michigan State (12–4–3)	Wisconsin (13–4–4)	Nebraska (15–3–3)	Iowa (13–5–4)	Iowa (13–5–4)	Iowa (13–5–4)	21.
22.	Harvard	Harvard (0–0–0)	Harvard (2–0–0)	Providence (5–0–0)	Texas (6–1–1)	Michigan (5–1–2)	Columbia (7–1–1)	Wisconsin (8–2–3)	Michigan (7–3–3)	Xavier (11–2–3)	Santa Clara (11–3–2)	South Carolina (11–1–6)	Nebraska (14–3–3)	Columbia (11–4–3)	Georgetown (13–2–7)	Georgetown (13–2–7)	Georgetown (13–2–7)	22.
23.	Memphis	Memphis (2–0–0)	Northwestern (3–0–1)	Brown (3–1–0)	Iowa (6–0–1)	Xavier (7–2–0)	Michigan State (7–2–2)	Kentucky (7–0–4)	Georgetown (7–1–6)	Arizona State (9–2–4)	South Alabama (14–0–3)	Indiana (12–3–4)	Columbia (10–4–3)	Gonzaga (14–3–2)	Arkansas (15–5–2)	Arkansas (15–5–2)	Arkansas (15–5–2)	23.
24.	Georgia	USC (1–0–0)	Michigan State (3–1–0)	Nebraska (5–0–1)	Colorado (7–1–0)	Georgia (4–1–3)	Saint Louis (7–2–2)	TCU (8–3–2)	TCU (9–4–2)	Wisconsin (10–3–3)	Harvard (9–3–2)	Lamar (14–2–2)	Lamar (15–2–3)	Santa Clara (14–4–2)	Wisconsin (14–5–4)	Wisconsin (14–5–4)	Wisconsin (14–5–4)	24.
25.	USC	Georgia (0–1–0)	Georgia (1–1–0)	Washington State (5–0–0)	Nebraska (6–1–1)	Princeton (5–1–1)	Liberty (11–0–0)	Wake Forest (8–1–2)	Kentucky (8–0–5)	South Alabama (12–0–3)	Xavier (12–2–4)	Columbia (9–3–3)	Gonzaga (13–3–2)	South Carolina (12–2–6)	Columbia (11–5–3)	Columbia (11–5–3)	Columbia (11–5–3)	25.
	Preseason Aug 15	Week 1 Aug 21	Week 2 Aug 28	Week 3 Sep 4	Week 4 Sep 11	Week 5 Sep 18	Week 6 Sep 25	Week 7 Oct 2	Week 8 Oct 9	Week 9 Oct 16	Week 10 Oct 23	Week 11 Oct 30	Week 12 Nov 6	Week 13 Nov 13	Week 14 Nov 20	Week 15 Nov 27	Final Dec 5	
		None	None	Dropped: No. 22 Harvard; No. 23 Northwestern; No. 24 Michigan State; No. 25 Georgia	Dropped: No. 20 TCU; No. 22 Providence; No. 25 Washington State	Dropped: No. 21 Brown; No. 23 Iowa; No. 25 Nebraska	Dropped: No. 15 Virginia; No. 19 Santa Clara; No. 22 Michigan; No. 23 Xavier; No. 24 Georgia	Dropped: No. 15 Princeton; No. 17 Indiana; No. 19 Duke; No. 21 Texas; No. 22 Columbia; No. 25 Liberty	Dropped: No. 17 Alabama; No. 25 Wake Forest	Dropped: No. 22 Michigan; No. 23 Gerogetown; No. 24 TCU; No. 25 Kentucky	Dropped: No. 18 Colorado	Dropped: No. 19 Arizona State; No. 22 Santa Clara	Dropped: No. 18 South Alabama; No. 20 Xavier; No. 21 Michigan State; No. 22 South Carolina; No. 23 Indiana	Dropped: No. 2 UCLA; No. 24 Lamar	Dropped: No. 23 Gonzaga; No. 24 Santa Clara; No. 25 South Carolina	None	None	
