= Olivia Griffitts =

American soccer player (born 2001)

Personal information
- Full name: Olivia Smith-Griffitts
- Birth name: Olivia Smith
- Date of birth: August 2, 2001 (age 25)
- Place of birth: Eagle, Idaho, U.S.
- Height: 5 ft 6 in (1.68 m)
- Position: Right back

College career
| Years | Team | Apps | (Gls) |
| 2019–2023 | BYU Cougars | 82 | (4) |

Senior career*
| Years | Team | Apps | (Gls) |
| 2024–2025 | Utah Royals | 13 | (1) |
- * Club domestic league appearances and goals as of September 28, 2024

Olivia Smith-Griffitts (née Smith; born August 2, 2001) is an American former professional soccer player who played as a right back in the National Women's Soccer League (NWSL). She played college soccer for the BYU Cougars and helped the team to its first national title game appearance in 2021. She was drafted by the Utah Royals in the second round of the 2024 NWSL Draft before retiring the next year at age 24.

== Early life ==
Griffitts was born in Eagle, Idaho, to Matt and Allyson Smith, and has five siblings. She was an all-state forward at Eagle High School, leading her conference in scoring, before changing positions to right back. She committed to play college soccer for the BYU Cougars before her senior year.

== College career ==
After redshirting as a freshman in 2019, Griffitts was a four-year starter for the BYU Cougars from 2020 to 2023, playing in 82 games with 79 starts and scoring 4 goals. Her debut season was shortened by the COVID-19 pandemic as BYU placed second in West Coast Conference (WCC). She played a complete college season for the first time in 2021, starting all 24 games, scoring 1 goal, and providing 7 assists, and earning WCC all-freshman honors. In 2021, BYU won the WCC title and earned a four seed in the NCAA tournament. They defeated reigning champion and WCC rivals Santa Clara in the semifinals to reach the first national title game in BYU program history, losing to Florida State on penalties. She started all 21 games and recorded 1 goal with 4 assists in 2022, picking up second-team All-WCC honors. In 2023, with the program's move to the Big 12 Conference, she scored 2 goals and added 8 assists in 22 games, helping the Cougars to the Big 12 tournament final and the NCAA tournament semifinals.

== Club career ==
Griffitts was drafted 20th overall by expansion team Utah Royals in the second round of the 2024 NWSL Draft. She was signed to a one-year contract with the option to extend for another year. She debuted for the Royals on March 31, starting in place of the injured Imani Dorsey in a 2–1 loss to the Washington Spirit. On April 20, she scored her first professional goal with an assist from Ally Sentnor during a 5–1 defeat to Racing Louisville. On October 1, she signed a new contract with the Royals through the 2027 season. She played and started in 13 games as a rookie.

After she started the next season on maternity leave, the Royals announced on September 23, 2025, that Griffitts would retire from soccer.

== Personal life ==
She married Kyle Griffitts in 2023.

== Honors and awards ==
BYU Cougars

- West Coast Conference: 2021
- NCAA tournament runner-up: 2021
- Big 12 Conference runner-up: 2023
- Big 12 tournament runner-up: 2023

Individual

- Second-team All-WCC: 2022
- WCC all-freshman team: 2021
