= Olivia Katoa =

American soccer player (born 1999)

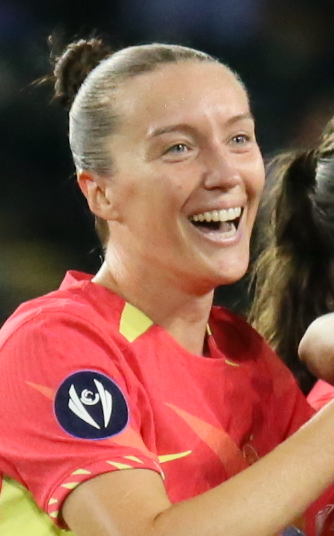
- Katoa with the Portland Thorns in 2024

Personal information
- Birth name: Olivia Jo Wade
- Date of birth: December 28, 1999 (age 26)
- Place of birth: Kaysville, Utah, United States
- Height: 5 ft 8 in (1.73 m)
- Position: Midfielder

Youth career
- La Roca FC

College career
| Years | Team | Apps | (Gls) |
| 2018–2023 | BYU Cougars | 120 | (25) |

Senior career*
| Years | Team | Apps | (Gls) |
| 2024–2025 | Portland Thorns | 5 | (0) |

International career
- United States U17
- * Club domestic league appearances and goals as of 04:53, December 3, 2025 (UTC)

Olivia Jo Katoa (née Wade; born December 28, 1999) is an American former professional soccer player who played as a midfielder. She played college soccer for the BYU Cougars before being selected by the Portland Thorns in the 2024 NWSL Draft.

== Early life ==
Katoa was born in Kaysville, Utah, into a family of five children. She attended Davis High School and played club soccer for La Roca FC. In 2016, Katoa was named Gatorade's Utah Player of the Year and The Salt Lake Tribune's player of the year in 2016. She is also a 5-time State Cup champion and won the 2016 UYSA National Championship Golden Ball.

== College career ==
Katoa played college soccer for the BYU Cougars. She scored her first collegiate goal in September 2018, tallying a last-minute game-winner in a match against the Utah Utes. After her freshman season at BYU, Katoa took time away from soccer in order to serve as a missionary in Houston, Texas.

She returned to BYU in 2021 and scored only 43 seconds into her first game back. The Cougars would eventually make it to the NCAA championship game, which culminated in a penalty shootout. Katoa converted her spot-kick, but Florida State prevailed to secure the victory.

In her final two seasons of college soccer, Katoa started all of BYU's games. She was named to the All-WCC Second Team and the NCAA Third Team All-Region in 2022. In her 2023, she co-captained BYU alongside teammate Jamie Shepherd. Katoa was named to the Big 12 All-Tournament team and to the All-American third team as a senior and helped BYU reach the NCAA semifinals. She finished her career at BYU having played in 120 games and scored 25 goals.

== Club career ==
Katoa was selected in the 2nd round of the 2024 NWSL Draft by Portland Thorns FC as the 23rd overall pick. In March 2024, she signed her first professional contract with the Thorns. She made her professional debut in the Thorns' season-opener, coming on as a substitute in a 5–4 defeat to the Kansas City Current. On July 21, 2024, Katoa recorded her first professional start and goal in an NWSL x Liga MX Femenil Summer Cup victory over Club Tijuana. She later had her rookie season curtailed early after picking up a season-ending knee injury in a CONCACAF W Champions Cup fixture in October 2025.

Katoa did not feature for the Thorns at any point in 2025, with maternity leave prolonging her absence from the field. She watched on from the sidelines as Portland secured third place in CONCACAF play and made it to the semifinals of the NWSL playoffs. At the end of the year, Katoa departed from the Thorns upon the expiration of her rookie contract.

On December 31, 2025, Katoa announced her retirement from professional soccer.

== International career ==
Katoa has represented the United States at the U17 level. She was named to the United States' squad for the 2015 NTC Invitational tournament in Carson, California. The USA would go on to win the tournament, securing the title for the second consecutive year.

== Personal life ==
Born into a basketball-geared family, both of Katoa's parents are former collegiate players, while her grandfather was a coach. Katoa's brother, Jesse Wade, also played sports for BYU.

In June 2023, she married former USC Trojans football player Tayler Katoa. In September 2025, the couple welcomed their first child, a son.

== Career statistics ==
=== Club ===
Appearances and goals by club, season and competition
| Club | Season | League | | | Cup (Note: Includes the NWSL Challenge Cup) | | Playoffs (Note: Includes NWSL Playoffs) | | Continental (Note: Includes CONCACAF W Champions Cup) | | Other | | Total | |
| Club | Season | Division | Apps | Goals | Apps | Goals | Apps | Goals | Apps | Goals | Apps | Goals | Apps | Goals |
|---|---|---|---|---|---|---|---|---|---|---|---|---|---|---|
| Portland Thorns FC | 2024 | NWSL | 5 | 0 | — | | 0 | 0 | 2 | 0 | 1 (Note: Includes NWSL x Liga MX Femenil Summer Cup) | 0 | 8 | 0 |
| Portland Thorns FC | 2025 | NWSL | 0 | 0 | — | | 0 | 0 | 0 | 0 | — | | 0 | 0 |
| Career total | | | 5 | 0 | 0 | 0 | 0 | 0 | 2 | 0 | 1 | 0 | 8 | 0 |
