= Lexi Missimo =

American soccer player (born 2003)

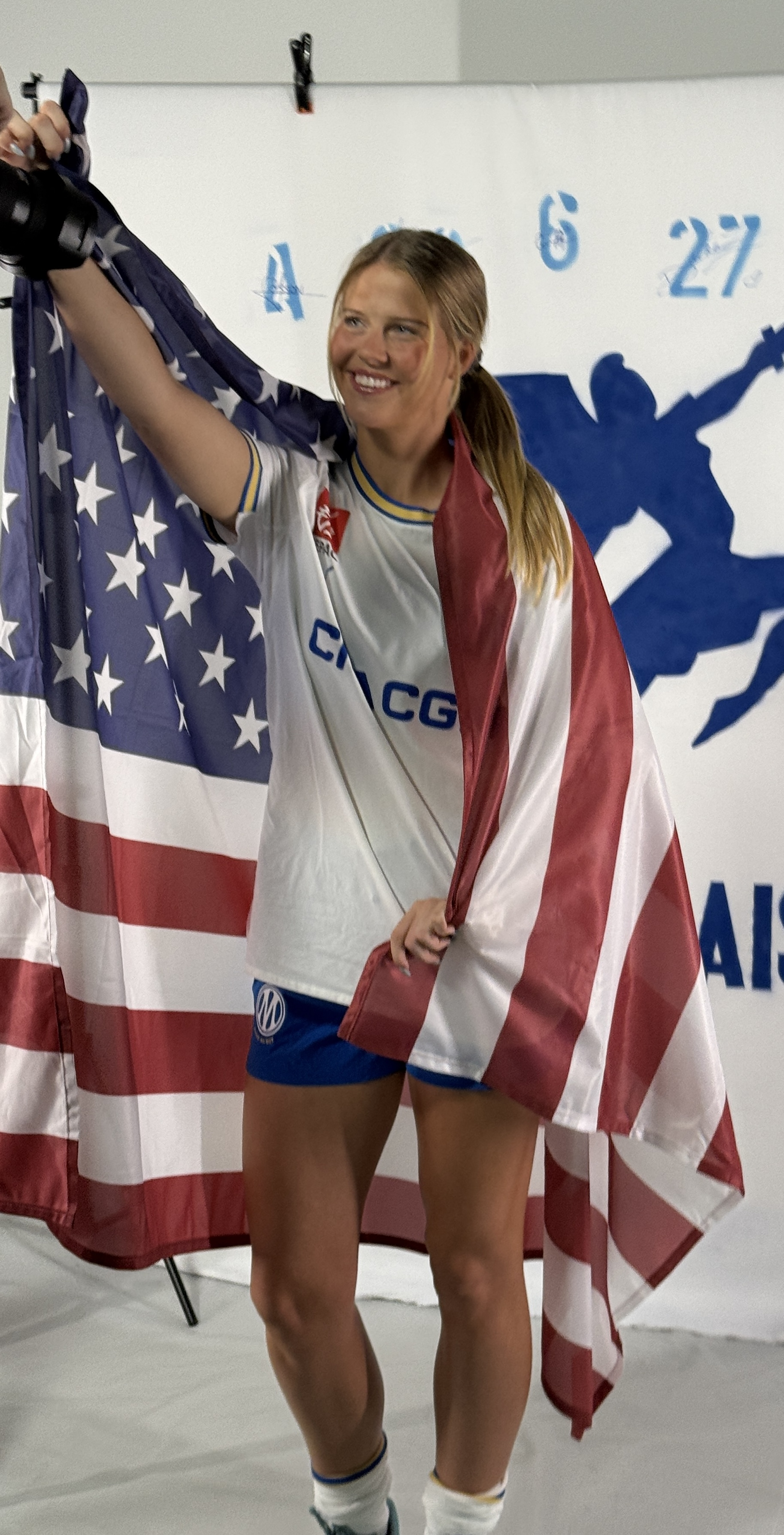
- Lexi Missimo at her initial photo shoot with Les Marseillaises in 2026

Personal information
- Full name: Alexis Danielle Missimo
- Date of birth: January 30, 2003 (age 23)
- Place of birth: Grapevine, Texas, U.S.
- Height: 5 ft 8 in (1.73 m)
- Position: Midfielder

Team information
- Current team: Les Marseillaises (on loan from the Dallas Trinity)
- Number: 8

Youth career
- 2008–2020: Solar SC

College career
Years	Team	Apps	(Gls)
2020–2024	Texas Longhorns	89	(56)

Senior career*
Years	Team	Apps	(Gls)
2025–	Dallas Trinity	23	(4)
2026–	→ Les Marseillaises (loan)	8	(1)

International career^{‡}
2016	United States U-14		
2017	United States U-15		
2018–2019	United States U-17	5	(1)
2019	United States U-18	2	(0)
2018	United States U-19	1	(0)
2021–2022	United States U-20	10	(3)
2022–	United States U-23	6	(0)
- * Club domestic league appearances and goals as of 05:17, May 26, 2026 (UTC) ‡ National team caps and goals as of 14:15, March 8, 2026 (UTC)

Alexis Danielle Missimo (born January 30, 2003) is an American professional soccer player who plays as a midfielder for Première Ligue club Les Marseillaises, on loan from Dallas Trinity FC. She played college soccer for the Texas Longhorns, setting the program scoring record and winning TopDrawerSoccer National Player of the Year in 2023. She was ranked by TopDrawerSoccer as the number-one recruit in her class. She represented the United States at the youth international level.

== Early life ==
Missimo played youth soccer for Solar SC of Dallas, Texas, beginning at age five. She helped win the USYS national under-13 championship in 2016 and reached the ECNL under-15 national championship game the next year. Between 2017 and 2019, Missimo scored 100 goals in 62 games in the Girls' Development Academy. Playing up four age groups in 2017–18, she led the Solar under-18/19 team in goals and helped them reach the national championship game, receiving conference Best XI recognition. She led Solar to win the national under-16/17 championship in 2019, receiving the Golden Boot as the playoffs' top scorer with 11 goals and being named the region's player of the year. She was a two-time United Soccer Coaches All-American (2018–2019) at the youth level. Goal.com named Missimo as a NXGN under-20 Wonderkid in both 2021 and 2022. They ranked her fourth in their global list both years.

Playing for Solar in the U.S. Soccer Development Academy from 2018-20, she scored 100 goals and assisted on 153. She was one of only two players in history of the league to score 100 career goals.

In August and November 2019, Missimo trained with England's Manchester City Women’s Football Club.

TopDrawer Soccer's 2021 IMG Academy Top 150 rankings from the Fall of 2018 to the Fall of 2021 rated Missimo as the No. 1 overall player and midfielder in the United States.

== College career ==
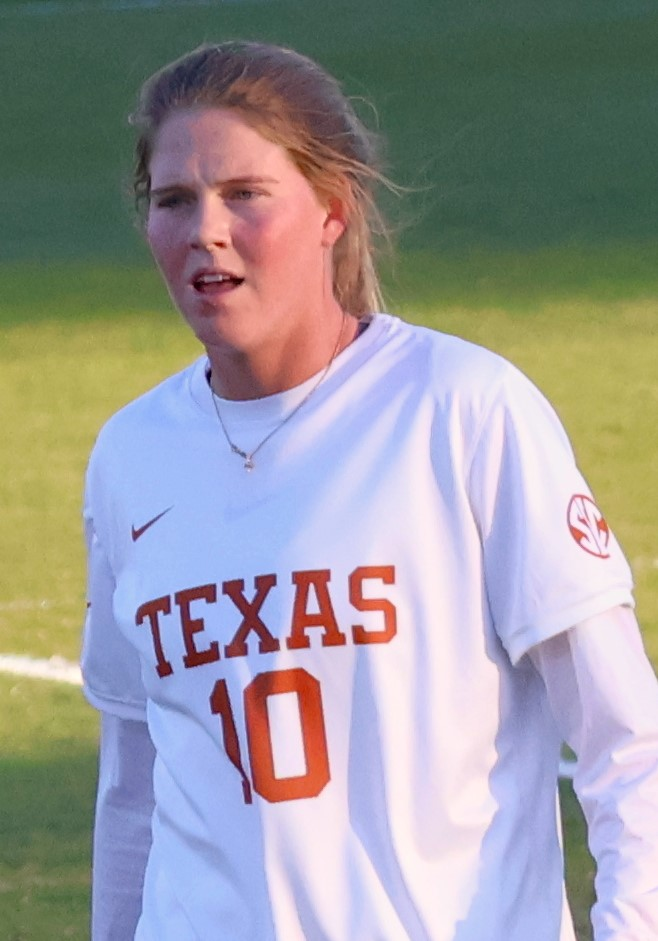
Missimo with Texas in 2024

Missimo verbally committed to Texas when she was in seventh grade. She was the number one recruit for the class of 2021, but elected to graduate from Southlake Carroll High School in three years in 2020 and enrolled at the University of Texas in the fall of that year. She had offers to go pro out of high school from Arsenal and Manchester City, the latter of which she had trained with. She scored in her college debut on March 5, 2021, a 4–0 win over Texas State. She scored two goals in a 4–0 win over Baylor on March 31. She finished the abbreviated spring season with three goals and two assists in three games.

Missimo started all 22 games during her freshman fall season in 2021, recording nine goals and 14 assists. Her assist total led the Big 12 Conference and tied the Texas program record for assists in a season. She was named the Big 12 Conference Freshman of the Year and recognized with All-Big 12 first-team, Big 12 all-tournament, and Big 12 All-Freshman honors.

During her sophomore season in 2022, Missimo played in 17 games after suffering an injury early in the season that forced her to miss six games. Despite the absence, she led the Big 12 and set the Texas program record for assists in a season with 15, which ranked third in NCAA Division I that season. Texas won the Big 12 regular season championship and reached the conference tournament semifinals. Missimo contributed an assist in the Longhorns' first-round NCAA tournament win over Texas A&M, and the team's season ended a 1–0 loss to Duke in the next round.

In January 2023, she trained with Women’s Super League club Chelsea and then-coach Emma Hayes.

In her third full season with Texas in 2023, Missimo earned All-American honors and was named the TopDrawerSoccer National Player of the Year. She scored 26 goals and recorded 20 assists. She became the first player in the history of the Texas program to record a 20–20 season. Missimo tied Carol Finch’s program record for points in a single match on Sept. 7, 2023, accumulating three goals and four assists (10 points) in a win against Stephen F. Austin. That game marked her seventh consecutive contest with an assist, establishing a new Longhorns record.

Missimo scored two goals in the Longhorns 3-1 win over BYU in the Big 12 Tournament Final.

The 2023 Big 12 Midfielder of the Year became the first student-athlete in conference history to lead the league in every individual statistical category: goals, goals per match, assists, assists per match, game-winning goals, points and points per match (all games) in a single season. She also became the fifth Division I women's soccer student-athlete since 2000 to score 72+ points in a single season (Catarina Macario, Lindsay Tarpley, Abby Wambach, and Christine Sinclair were the others). The total was tied for the 15th-most points scored in a single Division I women's soccer season. She led Division I in points-per-game for the second consecutive season.

Missimo finished her senior season with 12 goals and an SEC-joint-best 13 assists. She was named second-team United Soccer Coaches All-American, third-team TopDrawerSoccer Best XI, and first-team All-SEC. She broke Byars's program goals record with her 53rd career goal.

In that 2024 season, she finished second in the conference in total points (37), points per match (1.61), and assists per game (0.57). The campaign marked her second consecutive season with double figures in both goals and assists. She was also credited with an assist on Carly Montgomery’s goal in the Horns’ 1-0 win over South Carolina in the 2024 SEC Tournament Final. The win was the UT athletic program’s first title in any sport in the conference.

Missimo finished her tenure with the Longhorns as the program’s career leader in points (176), assists (64), and goals (56). She became the only player in program history to post multiple four-assist matches (4). She was a four-time first team all-conference honoree as well as a four-time all-tournament selection. Missimo recorded at least one point in 64 of her 89 (71.9 percent) matches at Texas. The team went 34-2-2 when she scored a goal and 10-1-0 when she scored twice. Missimo became the first American-born Division I women's soccer player to end her career with upwards of 50 goals and 50 assists since the 2012 season (Dayton’s Colleen Williams). She was a two-time MAC Hermann Trophy Semifinalist (2023, 2024) and a four-time honoree in the Top Drawer Soccer Best XI.

== Club career ==
USL Super League club Dallas Trinity FC announced on January 29, 2025, that they had signed Missimo to her first professional contract on a two-and-a-half year deal, surprising some observers for passing on offers in the National Women's Soccer League (NWSL) or overseas. She made her professional debut on February 15, starting and scoring her first goal just four minutes into a 1–1 draw with the Tampa Bay Sun. Two games later, she assisted Chioma Ubogagu's early opener and scored the fifth goal in a 6–0 victory over then league leaders Brooklyn FC. After scoring twice in five games, she underwent surgery for a ligament injury to her foot and was expected to return by the following season.

After eight months out of action, Missimo made her return as substitute in a 2–1 win over DC Power FC on December 6, 2025. The following week, she made her first start since the injury and scored the lone goal in a 1–0 win over the Carolina Ascent.

On August 11, 2026, it was announced that Missimo would go on loan to Les Marseillaises for the entire 2026–27 season in France. In her first Première Ligue appearance on September 12, 2026, Missimo came on in the 81st minute against RC Lens and created the game-winning goal in the 85th off a free kick, assisting Carina Baltrip-Reyes.

On September 26, 2026, Missimo scored her first Marseille goal in a 6–1 Coupe LFFP victory over Thonon Évian Grand Genève. Starting the match, she scored with a left-footed shot in the 29th minute as Marseille secured qualification for the competition’s playoffs. She subsequently started league matches against Strasbourg on October 3 and Fleury on October 18, which finished 3–3 and 2–2 respectively. On October 24, she appeared as a second-half substitute in Marseille’s 5–0 defeat at Lyon.

== International career ==
From 2016-26, Missimo participated in 35 domestic camps/international events with the U.S Women’s National Teams, while playing in 12 countries. Missimo began training with the United States youth national team at the under-14 level in March 2016. She made her international debut at the youth level on May 12, 2017, with the national under-16 team in a 4–0 win over Croatia. She scored her first youth international goal for the under-15 team against Germany on November 1, 2017. She and club teammate Trinity Byars led the under-16 team with five goals each at the Torneo delle Nazioni in 2018, which they won.

Missimo played up two age groups with the national under-17 team in the lead-up to the 2018 FIFA U-17 Women's World Cup, but did not make the roster for the World Cup. She was a key player in the build-up to the 2021 FIFA U-17 Women's World Cup, scoring three goals and adding two assists in two tournaments in Europe in 2019. She had both assists in the 2–0 win over England in Florida on February 22, 2020, which was the final game for the team before the qualifying event. However, the World Cup and the CONCACAF Women's U-17 Championship were canceled due to the covid pandemic.

Missimo was named to the under-20 team for the 2022 CONCACAF Women's U-20 Championship. She scored three goals in seven appearances while leading the United States to the championship and was one of four Americans to make the tournament's Best XI. However, prior to the 2022 FIFA U-20 Women's World Cup, she announced on social media that she had removed herself for consideration for the roster to focus on her sophomore college season.

Missimo was called into camp with the under-23 team in 2023. She played in a pair of friendlies against the French U-23 team in February of 2023 at the INF Clairefontaine national training center. She also joined the team for the Thorns Preseason Tournament and participated in three games against NWSL teams in March 2023 in Portland, Oregon.

Missimo was called up by Emma Hayes into the 2025 U.S. Women's National Team Futures Camp, practicing alongside the senior national team, in January 2025.

In January 2026, U.S. Soccer called her into the U.S. National Team Development Camp. The session ran concurrently with a senior team training camp. The next month, Missimo was selected to participate in the U.S. Under-23 Women’s National Team training camp from February 27 to March 7 in Florida.

== Personal life ==
Lexi Missimo comes from a deeply-rooted soccer lineage. She is the daughter of Derek and Susan Missimo, with her father leaving a historic mark at the University of North Carolina, as the program’s all-time leader in both goals (56) and total points (138). Together, they share a rare distinction of both surpassing the 50-goal mark in their collegiate careers. Lexi built a legacy of her own at the University of Texas, where she stands as the program’s all-time leader in goals (56), points (176), and assists (64). Derek also played a direct role in shaping her early development by coaching her youth club teams.

Her mother was a four-year letter winner for Texas Christian from 1991 to 1994. She has an older sister, Gabriella, who was part of the Texas Longhorns women's soccer team in 2019.

Missimo’s story was told in the docuseries Raising Her Game. The series, produced in 2023 and 2024, covered the concurrent advancement of U.S. Soccer and women’s sports through the lens of the Texas program and the eyes and experiences of Missimo and her teammates. It debuted on streaming service Victory+ in November of 2024, on Tubi in July of 2026, and The Roku Channel that August. It is also available for purchase on Amazon Prime Video.

== Career statistics ==
=== College ===
College	Regular Season				Conference Tournament		NCAA Tournament		Total	
College	Conference	Season	Apps	Goals	Apps	Goals	Apps	Goals	Apps	Goals
Texas Longhorns	Big 12	2020–21	3	3	—		—		3	3
Texas Longhorns	Big 12	2021	18	9	3	0	1	0	22	9
Texas Longhorns	Big 12	2022	13	5	2	1	2	0	17	6
Texas Longhorns	Big 12	2023	18	20	3	4	3	2	24	26
Texas Longhorns	SEC	2024	18	12	3	0	2	0	24	12
Career total			70	49	11	5	8	2	90	56

- Led the NCAA in assists per match (0.88) – 2022
- Led the NCAA in game-winning goals (9) – 2023
- Led the NCAA in total points (72) – 2023
- Led the NCAA in total assists (20) – 2023
- Led the NCAA in assists per match (0.83) – 2023

=== Club ===
As of match played on May 23, 2026

Club	Season	League			League Cup		Domestic Cup		Total	
Club	Season	Division	Apps	Goals	Apps	Goals	Apps	Goals	Apps	Goals
Dallas Trinity FC	2024–25	USL Super League	5	2	0	0	—		5	2
Dallas Trinity FC	2025–26	USL Super League	18	2	1	0	—		19	2
Career total			23	4	1	0	—		24	4

== Honors and awards ==
Texas Longhorns

- Big 12 Conference: 2022
- Big 12 Conference tournament: 2023
- SEC tournament: 2024

United States U-20

- CONCACAF Women's U-20 Championship: 2022

Individual

- Ranked #4 in the world for young women’s footballers in Goal’s NXGN rankings (2021, 2022)
- TopDrawerSoccer National Player of the Year: 2023
- First-team All-American: 2023
- Second-team All-American: 2024
- First-team All-Big 12: 2021, 2022, 2023
- First-team All-SEC: 2024
- Big 12 Midfielder of the Year: 2023
- Big 12 Freshman of the Year: 2021
- Big 12 tournament Offensive MVP: 2023
- Big 12 tournament all-tournament team: 2021, 2022, 2023
- SEC tournament all-tournament team: 2024
- Named to United Soccer Coaches All-Region First Team (2021, 2022, 2023, 2024)
- MAC Hermann Trophy Semifinalist (2023, 2024)
- Selected to TopDrawerSoccer Best XI (2021, 2022, 2023, 2024)
- Included on United Soccer Coaches Preseason National Watch List – Midfielders (2022, 2023, 2024)
- Named to MAC Hermann Trophy Preseason Watch List (2022, 2023, 2024)
- CONCACAF Women's U-20 Championship Best XI: 2022
