= Brecken Mozingo =

American soccer player (born 2001)

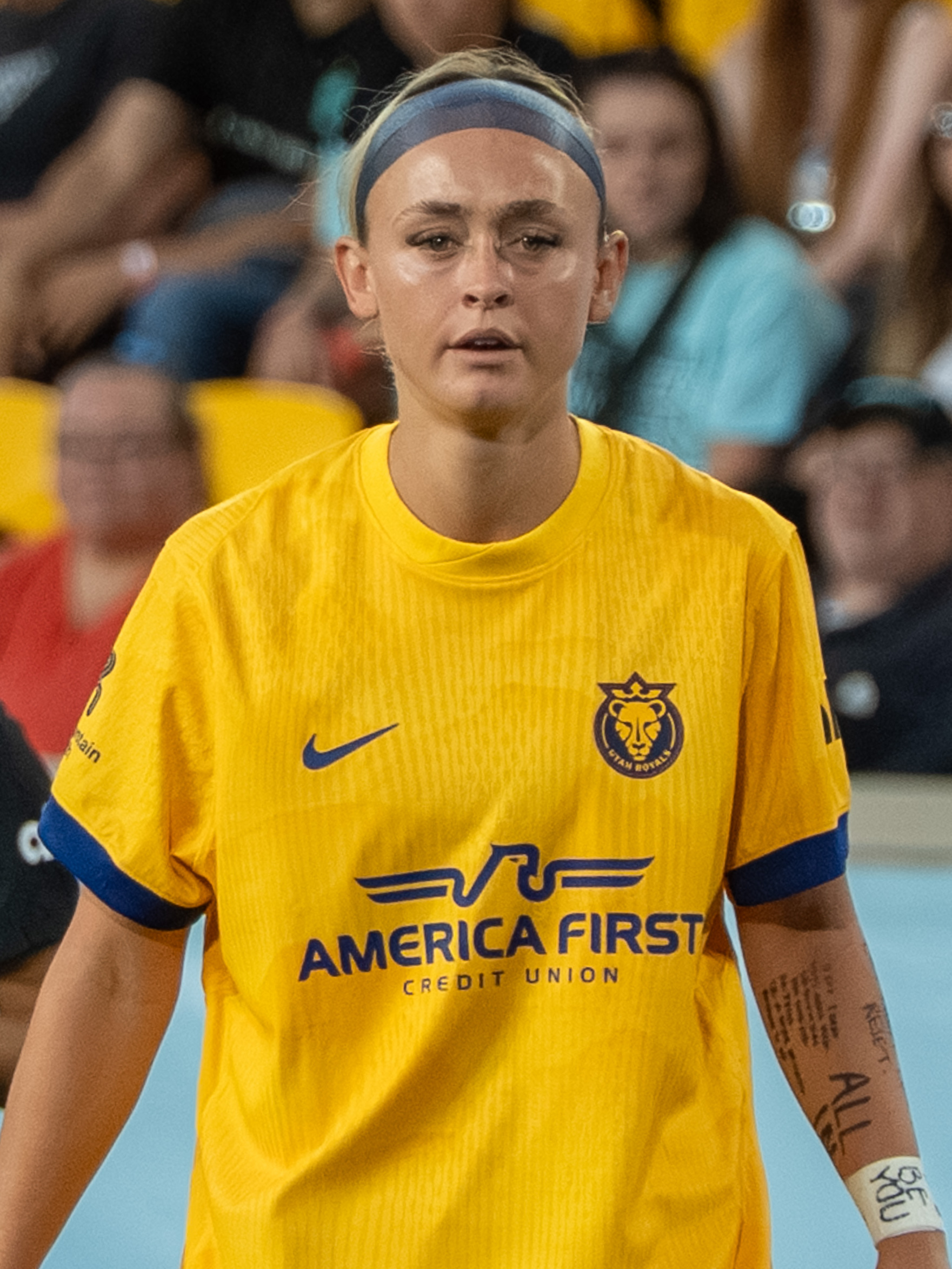
- Mozingo with the Utah Royals in 2025

Personal information
- Full name: Brecken Inga Mozingo
- Date of birth: March 8, 2001 (age 25)
- Place of birth: Salt Lake City, Utah, United States
- Height: 5 ft 6 in (1.68 m)
- Position: Forward

Team information
- Current team: Utah Royals
- Number: 13

College career
Years	Team	Apps	(Gls)
2019	UCLA Bruins	6	(0)
2020–2023	BYU Cougars	87	(36)

Senior career*
Years	Team	Apps	(Gls)
2024–	Utah Royals	59	(5)

International career
2017	United States U17		
- * Club domestic league appearances and goals as of 04:23, November 10, 2026 (UTC)

Brecken Inga Mozingo (born March 8, 2001) is an American professional soccer player who plays as a forward for the Utah Royals of the National Women's Soccer League (NWSL). She was drafted 4th overall by the Royals in the 2024 NWSL Draft after playing college soccer for the BYU Cougars.

== Early life ==
Mozingo was born in Salt Lake City, Utah, to Trev and Carly Mozingo, and has three younger brothers. She attended Alta High School and played club soccer for Utah Celtic FC and Sparta.

Mozingo was selected as the 2019 UYSA/Tosh Female Athlete of the Year. Named to the USYS 01 All-Star Team in 2016. Won two Utah State Cup championships with Utah Celtic FC and one with Sparta. Mozingo was a starter at Alta HS in 2015 and 2016 and set a school record with 38 goals in 2016. The record was previously held by her future Utah Royals teammate Michele Vasconcelos who scored 37 goals in a season.

== College career ==
Mozingo attended the University of California, Los Angeles where she made 6 appearances and played a total of 82 minutes. Following the 2019 season, Mozingo transferred to Brigham Young University for the rest of her colligate career. At BYU, Mozingo appeared in 92 games, scoring 36 goals and adding 37 assists. In the 2023 season, Mozingo was one of the nation's leaders in total points with 14 goals and 15 assists for the Cougars and was instrumental in BYU returning to the NCAA College Cup and a 20–3–3 record this season. As a result, Mozingo was named one of the three finalists for the 2023 MAC Hermann Trophy.

== Club career ==
Mozingo was drafted fourth overall to the Utah Royals at the 2024 NWSL Draft. She was the second pick for the Utah Royals in the draft. She was signed to a two-year contract with an option for an additional year. She made her professional debut on March 16, 2024, in a 2–0 loss to the Chicago Red Stars. She came in as a substitute in the 69th minute for Utah Royals in their sold-out home opener. She scored her first two professional goals in a 5–1 win against Tijuana on July 31, helping the Royals win their group at the 2024 NWSL x Liga MX Femenil Summer Cup.

== International career ==
Mozingo was called up to the United States national under-17 team in 2017.
