= Jamie Shepherd =

American soccer player (born 2000)

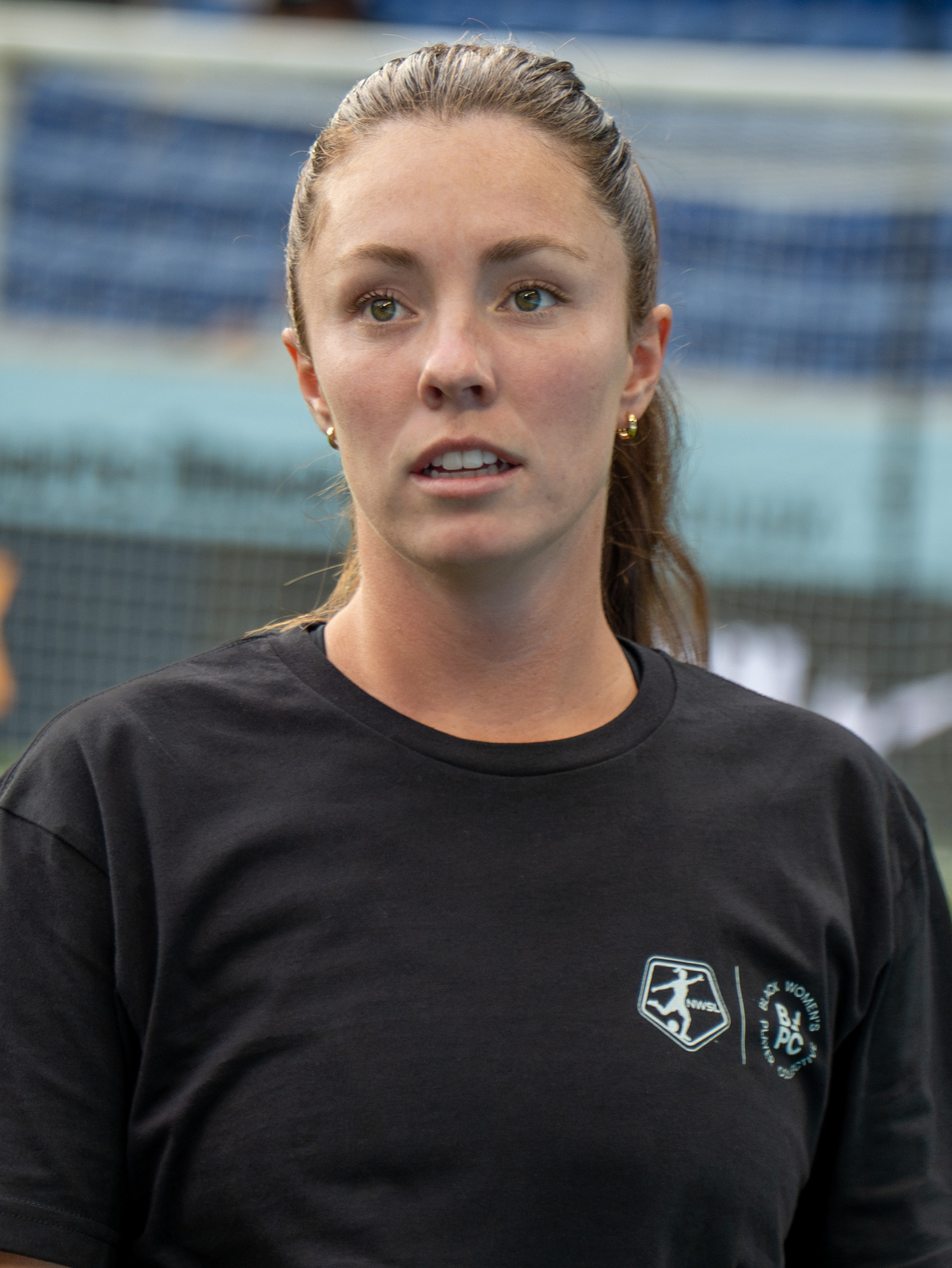
- Shepherd with Bay FC in 2025

Personal information
- Full name: Jamie Delacy Shepherd
- Date of birth: October 9, 2000 (age 26)
- Place of birth: American Fork, Utah, U.S.
- Height: 5 ft 7 in (1.70 m)
- Position: Midfielder

Team information
- Current team: Dallas Trinity
- Number: 22

Youth career
- Utah Celtic FC

College career
Years	Team	Apps	(Gls)
2019–2023	BYU Cougars	108	(14)

Senior career*
Years	Team	Apps	(Gls)
2024–	Bay FC	13	(0)
2026–	→ Dallas Trinity (loan)	0	(0)
- * Club domestic league appearances and goals as of July 28, 2026

Jamie Delacy Shepherd (born October 9, 2000) is an American professional soccer player who plays as a midfielder for USL Super League club Dallas Trinity, on loan from Bay FC. She played college soccer for the BYU Cougars, setting the program record for career appearances. She was drafted by Bay FC in the third round of the 2024 NWSL Draft.

== Early life ==
Shepherd was born in American Fork, Utah, and attended American Fork High School. She won state high school titles in both soccer and basketball in 2017, and was named Utah Gatorade Player of the Year for her performance in soccer. Shepherd played youth club soccer with Utah Celtic FC, and was part of the side that won the 2019 U19 U.S. Youth Soccer National Championship series, the first Utah team in the competition's history to do such.

== College career ==
Shepherd attended Brigham Young University, where she played as a midfielder for the BYU Cougars from 2019 to 2023. BYU reached the NCAA Division I tournament in each of the five seasons she was on the team, most notably making the quarter-finals or beyond on three occasions of the program's five total appearances as of 2023. Shepherd's first quarter-final appearance came in her freshman season, where BYU lost to eventual national champions Stanford Cardinal 5–1. The 2021 season was the best yet from BYU, with the school reaching the College Cup semi-finals for the first time ever, where they beat the Santa Clara Broncos on penalties after a 0–0 draw to reach their first ever College Cup final. However, BYU would fall short of winning the championship, losing to the Florida State Seminoles on penalty kicks after another 0–0 draw, Shepherd missing one of the shootout penalty kicks. In Shepherd's final season at BYU, the team reached the College Cup semi-finals for a second time in three seasons, but fell short once again against Stanford in a 2–0 loss. In five years, she played in a program record 108 games, scoring 14 times and registering 21 assists.

== Club career ==
Shepherd was drafted by National Women's Soccer League (NWSL) expansion side Bay FC with the 30th overall pick in the 2024 NWSL Draft. She was signed to an initial one-year contract with the option for another year. Shepherd made her professional debut in her first start on May 1, 2024, in a 3–2 home loss to the Portland Thorns. After her rookie season, she re-signed with the club on a one-year deal with a one-year option.

On July 1, 2025, Shepherd signed a new two-year contract with Bay FC through 2027, with the option for another year.

On July 28, 2026, Shepherd was sent on loan to USL Super League club Dallas Trinity until the end of the year.

== Career statistics ==
=== Club ===
As of August 13, 2025

Club	Season	League			Cup		Playoffs (Note: Includes NWSL Playoffs)		Total	
Club	Season	Division	Apps	Goals	Apps	Goals	Apps	Goals	Apps	Goals
Bay FC	2024	NWSL	2	0	—		—		2	0
Bay FC	2025	NWSL	7	0	—		—		7	0
Career total			9	0	0	0	0	0	9	0
