= 2026 Dallas Trinity FC fall season =

Dallas Trinity FC
2026 season
- Head coach: Lee Nguyen
- Stadium: Cotton Bowl
- USL Super League playoffs: TBD

The 2026 Dallas Trinity FC fall season is the third season for Dallas Trinity FC in the USL Super League.

== Season summary ==
On June 5, 2026, the USL Super League announced the league would hold a shortened 2026 fall season to set up for a calendar change in 2027 to a spring to fall schedule (the schedule used by the National Women's Soccer League). The goal of the change is to allow for better support of player movement, roster development, and long–term growth. After the previous season, Dallas Trinity was purchased by the group that own USL Championship side Atlético Dallas. The club then relieved General Manager Chris Petrucelli and Head Coach Nathan Thackeray of their duties. In their place, the club named Brian Corcoran as Sporting Director (in addition to his duties as Sporting Director for Atlético Dallas), and Lee Nguyen as Technical Director and First Team Manager.

== Players ==
=== Roster ===
As of September 22, 2026

Note: Flags indicate national team as defined under FIFA eligibility rules; some limited exceptions apply. Players may hold more than one non-FIFA nationality.

No.	Pos.	Nation	Player
1	GK	USA	Maddy Anderson
2	FW	USA	Onyeka Gamero (on loan from Bay FC)
4	DF	USA	Meila Brewer
5	DF	USA	Lauren Flynn
6	MF	USA	Felicia Knox
7	MF	USA	Heather Stainbrook (on loan from Washington Spirit)
8	MF	ARG	Sophie Braun
9	FW	USA	Kalea Eichenberger
11	FW	USA	Rajanah Reed
13	FW	USA	Cyera Hintzen
14	FW	ENG	Chioma Ubogagu
15	MF	USA	Giulianna Gianino
16	DF	USA	Sydney Cheesman

No.	Pos.	Nation	Player
17	FW	USA	Jasmine Hamid
19	MF	USA	Aria Nagai (on loan from Utah Royals)
21	FW	USA	Camryn Lancaster
22	MF	USA	Jamie Shepherd (on loan from Bay FC)
23	MF	USA	Juliet Moore
24	MF	CAN	Wayny Balata
25	DF	USA	Drew Coomans
28	MF	USA	Carissa Boeckmann
30	FW	USA	Seven Castain (on loan from Orlando Pride)
32	MF	PAN	Sofia Cedeño (on loan from Seattle Reign)
33	FW	USA	Ally Cook
35	GK	USA	Neeku Purcell (on loan from Seattle Reign)
88	FW	USA	Heather MacNab

==== Out on loan ====
Note: Flags indicate national team as defined under FIFA eligibility rules; some limited exceptions apply. Players may hold more than one non-FIFA nationality.

No.	Pos.	Nation	Player
10	MF	USA	Lexi Missimo (on loan to Les Marseillaises through June 31, 2027)

== Competitions ==
=== Regular season standings ===
Pos	Team	Pld	W	L	T	GF	GA	GD	Pts	Qualification
3	Sporting Club Jacksonville	12	4	2	6	25	20	+5	18	Playoffs
4	Lexington SC	12	5	5	2	20	13	+7	17	Playoffs
5	Dallas Trinity FC	11	4	4	3	14	14	0	15	
6	Brooklyn FC	12	3	6	3	13	25	−12	12	
7	Tampa Bay Sun FC	11	2	5	4	11	16	−5	10	

Updated to match(es) played on November 15, 2026. Source: USL Super League
Rules for classification: 1) head-to-head points; 2) total goal differential; 3) total goals scored; 4) disciplinary points; 5) drawing of lots.

==== Matches ====
August 15, 2026 1	Dallas Trinity FC	1–1	Tampa Bay Sun FC	Dallas, Texas
7:30 PM CT				Stadium: Cotton Bowl

August 22, 2026 2	Dallas Trinity FC	1–3	Carolina Ascent FC	Dallas, Texas
7:30 PM CT				Stadium: Cotton Bowl

August 29, 2026 3	Sporting JAX	2–0	Dallas Trinity FC	Jacksonville, Florida
6:00 PM CT				Stadium: Hodges Stadium

September 5, 2026 4	Dallas Trinity FC	3–0	Brooklyn FC	Dallas, Texas
7:30 PM CT				Stadium: Cotton Bowl

September 13, 2026 5	Dallas Trinity FC	2–1	DC Power FC	Dallas, Texas
6:30 PM CT				Stadium: Cotton Bowl

September 18, 2026 6	Fort Lauderdale United FC	1–2	Dallas Trinity FC	Davie, Florida
6:30 PM CT				Stadium: Amerant Bank Field

September 25, 2026 7	Lexington SC	3–0	Dallas Trinity FC	Lexington, Kentucky
6:30 PM CT				Stadium: Lexington SC Stadium

October 10, 2026 8	Brooklyn FC	1–1	Dallas Trinity FC	New York, New York
3:00 PM CT				Stadium: Maimonides Park

October 25, 2026 9	DC Power FC	1–0	Dallas Trinity FC	Washington, D.C.
2:00 PM CT				Stadium: Audi Field

November 1, 2026 10	Dallas Trinity FC	3–0	Fort Lauderdale United FC	Dallas, Texas
4:00 PM CT				Stadium: Cotton Bowl

November 8, 2026 11	Dallas Trinity FC	1–1	Sporting JAX	Dallas, Texas
4:00 PM CT				Stadium: Cotton Bowl

November 14, 2026 12	Tampa Bay Sun FC	v	Dallas Trinity FC	Tampa, Florida
5:00 PM CT				Stadium: Suncoast Credit Union Field

November 21, 2026 13	Dallas Trinity FC	v	Lexington SC	Dallas, Texas
7:30 PM CT				Stadium: Cotton Bowl

November 28, 2026 14	Carolina Ascent FC	v	Dallas Trinity FC	Charlotte, North Carolina
5:00 PM CT				Stadium: American Legion Memorial Stadium
