= 2025–26 Dallas Trinity FC season =

2025–26 Dallas Trinity season

Dallas Trinity FC
2025-26 season
- Stadium: Cotton Bowl, Dallas, Texas, US
- USL Super League: 4th
- USLS Playoffs: Semi-finals
- Copa Tejas: 5th
- Top goalscorer: League: Sealey Strawn (5 goals); All: Sealey Strawn (5 goals)
- Highest home attendance: 5682
- Lowest home attendance: 1,527
- Average home league attendance: 3,048
- Biggest win: FTL 0–4 DAL 2/7; DAL 4–0 FTL (5/16)
- Biggest defeat: LEX 6–1 DAL 9/26
Home colors	Away colors
- All statistics correct as of 00:43, May 29, 2026 (UTC).

The 2025–26 season of Dallas Trinity FC was the team's second season as a professional women's soccer team and as well as the second for the USL Super League (USLS), one of two leagues to be in the top tier of women's soccer in the United States.

== Background ==
Dallas Trinity qualified for the inaugural USL Super League playoffs during the 2024-25 campaign, coming in 3rd in league standings where they lost to eventual playoff champions, Tampa Bay United in the semi-finals.

Dallas won 12 games the previous season, earning 3rd place in the league standings.

== Players and staff ==
=== Current squad ===
As of January 20, 2026

Note: Flags indicate national team as defined under FIFA eligibility rules; some limited exceptions apply. Players may hold more than one non-FIFA nationality.

No.	Pos.	Nation	Player
2	DF	USA	Hannah Davison
3	DF	USA	Kiley Dulaney
4	FW	USA	Caroline Kelly
5	DF	USA	Lauren Flynn
6	MF	USA	Heather Stainbrook (on loan from Washington Spirit)
8	MF	FIN	Jenny Danielsson
10	FW	USA	Lexi Missimo
11	MF	USA	Maya McCutcheon
13	FW	USA	Cyera Hintzen
14	FW	ENG	Chioma Ubogagu

No.	Pos.	Nation	Player
17	MF	USA	Gracie Brian
18	DF	USA	Samar Guidry
20	FW	USA	Allie Thornton
21	FW	USA	Camryn Lancaster
22	MF	USA	Amber Wisner (captain)
24	MF	CAN	Wayny Balata
25	DF	USA	Lauren Lapomarda
26	GK	USA	Tyler McCamey
88	FW	USA	Bethany Bos
99	GK	USA	Samantha Estrada

=== Academy players ===
Note: Flags indicate national team as defined under FIFA eligibility rules; some limited exceptions apply. Players may hold more than one non-FIFA nationality.

No.	Pos.	Nation	Player
7	FW	USA	Rhea Moore
12	MF	USA	Sealey Strawn
52	MF	USA	Caroline Swann

=== Staff ===
As of January 20, 2026*

Front office
Position	Name
Owner	(United States) Neil Family
President	(United States) Charlie Neil
General Manager	(United States) Chris Petrucelli
Technical staff
Head Coach	Nathan Thackeray
Assistant Coach	Gavin Beith
Head of Soccer Operations	Becky Maines
Goalkeeper Coach	Giovanni Solis
3rd Assistant/Analyst	Nick Petrucelli
Head of Performance	Jonathan Corbett

== Transfers ==
As of February 3, 2026

=== In ===
Player	Previous Team	Date	Ref.
(United States) Lauren Lapomarda	Texas Longhorns	July 21, 2025	
(Canada) Rylee Foster	Durham W.F.C.	July 9, 2025	
(United States) Samar Guidry	Virginia Cavaliers	July 12, 2025	
(United States) Maya McCutcheon	Wellington Phoenix FC	July 10, 2025	
(United States) Kiley Dulaney	Washington Spirit	July 11, 2025	
(Canada) Wayny Balata	Spokane Zephyr	July 13, 2025	
(United States) Caroline Kelly	Brooklyn FC	July 14, 2025	
(United States) Lauren Flynn	Utah Royals	January 20, 2026	
(United States) Tyler McCamey	Kansas City Current	January 20, 2026	
(United States) Bethany Bos	Racing Louisville FC	February 3, 2026	

=== Out ===
Player	Fee/Notes	Date	Ref.
(United States) Madison White	End of loan	July 1, 2025	
(United States) Julia Dorsey	N/A	July 1, 2025	
(United States) Maya Gordon	N/A	July 1, 2025	
(United States) Rachel Pace	N/A	July 1, 2025	
(Sweden) Maja Henriksson	N/A	July 1, 2025	
(United States) Enzi Broussard	N/A	July 1, 2025	
(United States) Jenna Winebrenner	Retired	July 1, 2025	
(Mexico) Athalie Palomo	N/A	July 1, 2025	
(United States) Haley Berg	N/A	July 1, 2025	
(Costa Rica) Gabriela Guillen	N/A	July 1, 2025	
(United States) Natalie Wagner	End of academy contract	July 2, 2025	
(United States) Evan O'Steen	End of academy contract	July 2, 2025	

=== Loan in ===
No.	Pos.	Player	Loaned from	Start	End	Source
6	MF	(Nigeria) Deborah Abiodun	(United States) Washington Spirit	February 7, 2025	August 26, 2025	
16	FW	(Brazil) Tamara Bolt	(United States) Washington Spirit	February 7, 2025	December 31, 2025	
16	FW	(Uganda) Shadia Nankya	(United States) Washington Spirit	March 8, 2025	December 31, 2025	
6	MF	(United States) Heather Stainbrook	(United States) Washington Spirit	January 20, 2026	June 30, 2026	

== Friendlies ==
=== Pre-season ===
August 2, 2025 Friendly	Dallas Trinity FC (United States)	–	(United States) SMU	University Park, Texas
7:00PM CST				Stadium: Westcott Field
Note: Game played behind closed doors and results were not made publicly available

August 16, 2025 Friendly	Dallas Trinity FC (United States)	–	(United States) Kansas City Current II	Dallas, Texas
				Stadium: Cotton Bowl
Note: Game played behind closed doors and results were not made publicly available

=== Mid-season ===
October 18, 2025 Friendly	Dallas Trinity FC (United States)	1–3	(Mexico) America	Dallas, Texas
4:00PM CST	Brian (yellow card) 51'; Strawn 71'	Report	Luebbert 33'; Vilamala 38'; Mejía 45'; Soto (yellow card) 51'; Ramos (yellow card) 77'	Stadium: Cotton Bowl; Attendance: 22,838; Referee: Kaitlyn Trowbridge

February 28, 2026 Friendly	Dallas Trinity FC	1–0	Houston Dash	Dallas, Texas
6:00PM CST	Kelly 64'	Report		Stadium: Cotton Bowl; Attendance: 6,110

== Competitions ==
=== USL Super League ===
==== Regular season standings ====
Pos	Team	Pld	W	L	T	GF	GA	GD	Pts	Qualification
2	Sporting JAX	28	16	7	5	54	32	+22	53	Playoffs
3	Carolina Ascent	28	15	7	6	39	27	+12	51	Playoffs
4	Dallas Trinity	28	11	10	7	36	40	−4	40	Playoffs
5	Spokane Zephyr	28	10	9	9	34	28	+6	39	
6	DC Power	28	8	11	9	34	32	+2	33	

Updated to match(es) played on May 16, 2026. Source: Gainbridge Super League
Rules for classification: 1) head-to-head points; 2) total goal differential; 3) total goals scored; 4) disciplinary points; 5) drawing of lots.

==== Results summary ====
Overall								Home						Away					
Pld	W	D	L	GF	GA	GD	Pts	W	D	L	GF	GA	GD	W	D	L	GF	GA	GD
28	11	7	10	36	40	−4	40	6	3	5	20	19	+1	5	4	5	16	21	−5

==== Regular season ====
The league fixtures were released on May 6, 2025.

Win Draw Loss Postponed Fixtures

August 23, 2025 1	Dallas Trinity FC	2–1	Spokane Zephyr FC	Dallas, TX
7:30 PM CDT	Wisner (yellow card) 45+1'; Balata 48'; Hintzen (yellow card) 56'; Thornton 70'	Report	Braun (yellow card) 13'; Cook 21'; Tucker (yellow card) 40'	Stadium: Cotton Bowl; Attendance: 2,763; Referee: Rachel Swett

August 30, 2025 2	Dallas Trinity FC	1–0	Brooklyn FC	Dallas, TX
7:30 PM CDT	McCutcheon 13'; Tamara (yellow card) 45+4'	Report	Cooke (yellow card) 45'; Tengarrinha (yellow card) 45+3' (yellow-red card) 48'; Thompson (yellow card) 46'; Kroeger (yellow card) 62'; Breslin (yellow card) 63'; Loving (yellow card) 86'; Santo (yellow card) 90+3'	Stadium: Cotton Bowl; Attendance: 2,447; Referee: Alexandra Billeter

September 6, 2025 3	Sporting JAX	0–1	Dallas Trinity FC	Jacksonville, FL
7:30 PM EDT	Boman (yellow card) 40'	Report	Lancaster (yellow card) 14'; Moore 82'; Petrucelli (yellow card) 90+2'	Stadium: Hodges Stadium; Attendance: 2,314; Referee: Lauren Aldrich

September 13, 2025 4	Fort Lauderdale United FC	4–1	Dallas Trinity FC	Davie, FL
7:30 PM EDT	Nabet (yellow card) 9'; Van Treeck 16', 59'; Davison 40' (o.g.); Locklear 81'	Report		Stadium: Beyond Bancard Field; Attendance: 1,507; Referee: Iryna Petrunok

September 20, 2025 5	Tampa Bay Sun FC	1–1	Dallas Trinity FC	Tampa, FL
7:30 PM EDT	Hendrix (yellow card) 50'; Giammona 68'; Listro (yellow card) 72'; Battilla (yellow card) 85'	Report	Thornton 6'; Petrucelli (yellow card) 28'; Strawn (yellow card) 84'	Stadium: Riverfront Stadium; Attendance: 1,507; Referee: Gloria Resendiz

September 26, 2025 6	Lexington SC	6–1	Dallas Trinity FC	Lexington, KY
6:00 PM EDT	Barry 9', 27'; McCain 21', 77'; Aylmer (yellow card) 45+1'; Johnson (yellow card) 45+3'; Ekic 71'; Moyer (yellow card) 88', (goal) 90+1'; Fung (yellow card) 90+2'	Report	Strawn 24'; Guidry (yellow card) 48' (yellow-red card) 58'; Petrucelli (red card) 78'	Stadium: Lexington SC Stadium; Attendance: 1,410; Referee: Jamie Padilla

October 12, 2025 7	Spokane Zephyr FC	2–0	Dallas Trinity FC	Spokane, WA
8:00 PM PDT	Waldeck 60'; McCutcheon 67' (o.g.)	Report	Davison (yellow card) 70'; Wisner (yellow card) 81'	Stadium: One Spokane Stadium; Attendance: 1,373; Referee: Marie Durr

November 2, 2025 8	Dallas Trinity FC	2–3	DC Power FC	Dallas, TX
4:00 PM CST	Brian (yellow card) 18', (goal) 85'; Lancaster 20'	Report	Bedoya 13'; Fitch 70'; Gourley 78'; Abera (yellow card) 90+11'	Stadium: Cotton Bowl; Attendance: 3,229; Referee: Iryna Petrunok

November 8, 2025 9	Dallas Trinity FC	0–2	Sporting JAX	Dallas, TX
4:00 PM CST	McCutcheon (red card) 71'; Wisner (yellow card) 81'	Report	Kenton 6'; Puerta 23'; Vaka (yellow card) 90+5'	Stadium: Cotton Bowl; Attendance: 1,983; Referee: Rodrigo Albuquerque

November 15, 2025 10	Spokane Zephyr FC	0–2	Dallas Trinity FC	Spokane, WA
6:00 PM PST			Strawn 29'; Ubogagu (yellow card) 59'; Moore 90+3'	Stadium: One Spokane Stadium; Attendance: 1,463; Referee: Mark Verso

December 6, 2025 11	Dallas Trinity FC	2–1	DC Power FC	Dallas, TX
2:30 PM CST	Thornton 10', (yellow card) 65'; Brian 33'		Gourley 21'	Stadium: Cotton Bowl; Attendance: 2,569; Referee: Elton García

December 13, 2025 12	Dallas Trinity FC	1–0	Carolina Ascent FC	Dallas, TX
2:30 PM CST	Brian (yellow card) 27'; Missimo 64'; Davison (yellow card) 79'; Strawn (yellow card) 90+3'		Porter (yellow card) 22'	Stadium: Cotton Bowl; Attendance: 2,377; Referee: Cristian Campo Hernández

December 20, 2025 13	Dallas Trinity FC	1–1	Lexington SC	Dallas, TX
2:30 PM CST	Ubogagu 52'; Strawn (yellow card) 83'	Report	Pantuso 28'; Weinert (yellow card) 45+1'; Sharts (yellow card) 49'; Ekic (penalty missed)	Stadium: Cotton Bowl; Attendance: 2,204; Referee: Atahan Yaya

January 31, 2026 14	Dallas Trinity FC	1–1	Brooklyn FC	Dallas, TX
4:00 PM CST	Flynn (yellow card) 1'; Lancaster 58'	Report	Garziano (yellow card) 63'; Thompson (yellow card) 73'; Cooke 83'	Stadium: Cotton Bowl; Attendance: 1,527; Referee: Emmy Nonso-Ayakwo

February 7, 2026 15	Fort Lauderdale United FC	0–4	Dallas Trinity FC	Davie, FL
7:30 PM EST	Vaka (yellow card) 62'	Report	Stainbrook 25', (yellow card) 75'; Balata 52'; Hintzen (yellow card) 59'; Flynn 71'; Missimo 72'; Strawn 86'	Stadium: Beyond Bancard Field; Attendance: 1,525; Referee: Edson Carvajal

March 8, 2026 16	Lexington SC	0–1	Dallas Trinity FC	Lexington, KY
1:00 PM EST	Brown (yellow card) 39'	Report	Swann (yellow card) 80'; Guidry (yellow card) 86'; Stainbrook 90+3'	Stadium: Lexington SC Stadium; Attendance: 1,818; Referee: Kyle Johnston
Note: Postponed due to Lexington SC field conditions, rescheduled March 8, 2026

February 21, 2026 17	Carolina Ascent FC	2–0	Dallas Trinity FC	Charlotte, NC
2:00 PM EST	Nabet (yellow card) 20' (yellow-red card) 86'; Studer 26', 63'	Report	Flynn (yellow card) 71' (yellow-red card) 90+1'; Guidry (yellow card) 73'; Wisner (yellow card) 84'	Stadium: American Legion Memorial Stadium; Attendance: 2,406; Referee: Thomas Snyder

March 12, 2026 18	DC Power FC	1–1	Dallas Trinity FC	Audi Field
7:00 PM EDT	Abera 17'; Constant (yellow card) 58'	Report	Stainbrook (yellow card) 7'; Box 44'	Stadium: Washington, D.C. Attendance: 2,330; Referee: Jamie Padilla

March 19, 2026 19	Dallas Trinity FC	2–2	Lexington SC	Dallas, TX
	Missimo 55'; Flynn 79'	Report	Bourgeois 26'; Griffith (yellow card) 42'; Barry 90+3'	Stadium: Cotton Bowl; Attendance: 3,651; Referee: Muhammad Kaleia

March 22, 2026 20	Dallas Trinity FC	0–4	Sporting JAX	Dallas, TX
4:00 PM CDT	Swann (yellow card) 32'; Stainbrook (yellow card) 45+6'; Ubogagu (yellow card) 60'; Thackeray (yellow card) 76'; Davison (yellow card) 90'	Report	Brown (yellow card) 42'; DeSmit 45'; Kenton 45+2', (yellow card) 68'; Boman 56'; Hughes 84'	Stadium: Cotton Bowl; Attendance: 3,741; Referee: Danielle Chesky

March 31, 2026 21	Dallas Trinity FC	1–2	Tampa Bay Sun FC	Dallas, TX
7:30 PM CDT	Balata (yellow card) 33'; Wisner 76' (pen.)	Report	McNeill 29'; Shimkin (yellow card) 62'; Zade (yellow card) 72'; Giamonna 85'; Listro 90+2'	Stadium: Cotton Bowl; Attendance: 2,321; Referee: Shawn Tehini

April 4, 2026 22	Dallas Trinity FC	3–1	Spokane Zephyr FC	Cotton Bowl
	Oyler 15' (o.g.); Wisner 48' (pen.); Danielsson 90+1'	Report	Rapp 88'	Attendance: 2,979; Referee: Drew Klemp

April 12, 2026 23	Brooklyn FC	3–0	Dallas Trinity FC	Maimonides Park
	Breslin (yellow card) 32' (red card) 69'; Hill 44'; Cooke 57', 85'	Report		Attendance: 1,483; Referee: Carlos Rodriguez

April 19, 2026 24	Dallas Trinity FC	0–1	Carolina Ascent FC	Cotton Bowl
		Report	Baisden 89'	Attendance: 5,225; Referee: Laadi Issaka

April 26, 2026 25	Brooklyn FC	1–1	Dallas Trinity FC	Maimonides Park
	Childers 79'	Report	Lancaster 90'	Attendance: 1,001; Referee: Braeden Frey

May 1, 2026 26	DC Power FC	1–1	Dallas Trinity FC	Washington, D.C.
7:00 PM EDT	Gaynor (yellow card) 45+4'	Report	Bos 52'; Guidry (yellow card) 53'	Stadium: Audi Field; Attendance: 1,407; Referee: Kelsey Harms

May 9, 2026 27	Tampa Bay Sun FC	0–2	Dallas Trinity FC	Tampa, FL
7:30 PM EDT		Report	Guidry 2'; Lancaster 27'	Stadium: Riverfront Stadium; Attendance: 2,642; Referee: Marie Durr

May 16, 2026 28	Dallas Trinity FC	4–0	Fort Lauderdale United FC	Cotton Bowl
7:30 PM CDT	Thornton 27'; Strawn 31', 69'; Bos 87'	Report		Attendance: 5,682; Referee: Laura Rodriguez

=== Playoffs ===
May 23, 2026	Lexington SC	2–0	Dallas Trinity	Lexington, Kentucky
5:00 PM ET	Griffith 40'; Barry 51'	Report		Stadium: Lexington SC Stadium; Attendance: 3,235; Referee: Lauren Aldrich

== Squad statistics ==
=== Appearances and goals ===
As of match played May 23, 2026

Players with no appearances are not included on the list, italics indicate a loaned in player

No.	Pos	Nat	Player	Total		USL Super League		Playoffs		Friendlies	
No.	Pos	Nat	Player	Apps	Goals	Apps	Goals	Apps	Goals	Apps	Goals
2	DF	(United States) USA	Hannah Davison	21	0	20	0	1	0	0	0
3	DF	(United States) USA	Kiley Dulaney	17	0	16	0	1	0	0	0
4	FW	(United States) USA	Caroline Kelly	14	0	14	0	0	0	0	0
5	DF	(United States) USA	Lauren Flynn	9	2	9	2	0	0	0	0
6	MF	(United States) USA	Heather Stainbrook	11	2	11	2	0	0	0	0
8	MF	(Finland) FIN	Jenny Danielsson	9	1	8	1	1	0	0	0
10	MF	(United States) USA	Lexi Missimo	18	0	17	0	1	0	0	0
11	MF	(United States) USA	Maya McCutcheon	26	1	25	1	1	0	0	0
12	MF	(United States) USA	Sealey Strawn	26	5	25	5	1	0	0	0
13	FW	(United States) USA	Cyera Hintzen	29	0	28	0	1	0	0	0
14	MF	(England) ENG	Chioma Ubogagu	27	1	27	1	0	0	0	0
16	DF	(United States) USA	Sydney Cheesman	9	0	8	0	1	0	0	0
17	MF	(United States) USA	Gracie Brian	19	2	18	2	1	0	0	0
18	DF	(United States) USA	Samar Guidry	26	1	25	1	1	0	0	0
20	FW	(United States) USA	Allie Thornton	26	4	25	4	1	0	0	0
21	MF	(United States) USA	Camryn Lancaster	27	4	26	4	1	0	0	0
22	MF	(United States) USA	Amber Wisner	27	3	26	3	1	0	0	0
24	MF	(Canada) CAN	Wayny Balata	22	2	22	2	0	0	0	0
25	DF	(United States) USA	Lauren Lapomarda	1	0	0	0	1	0	0	0
26	GK	(United States) USA	Tyler McCamey	16	0	15	0	1	0	0	0
52	DF	(United States) USA	Caroline Swann	12	0	12	0	0	0	0	0
88	FW	(United States) USA	Bethany Bos	14	3	13	3	1	0	0	0
99	GK	(United States) USA	Samantha Estrada	2	0	2	0	0	0	0	0
	GK	(Canada) CAN	Rylee Foster	12	0	12	0	0	0	0	0
	FW	(United States) USA	Rhea Moore	9	2	9	2	0	0	0	0
	DF	(Uganda) UGA	Shadia Nankya	1	0	1	0	0	0	0	0
	FW	(Brazil) BRA	Tamara Bolt	12	0	12	0	0	0	0	0
	FW	(England) ENG	Lucy Shepherd	3	0	3	0	0	0	0	0
	MF	(Nigeria) NGR	Deborah Abiodun	1	0	1	0	0	0	0	0

=== Assists ===
As of match played May 23, 2026

Rank	No.	Nat.	Name	USLS	Playoffs	Total
1	14	(England)	Chioma Ubogagu	4	0	4
2	10	(United States)	Lexi Missimo	3	0	3
2	21	(United States)	Camryn Lancaster	3	0	3
2		(Brazil)	Tamara Bolt	3	0	3
5	13	(United States)	Cyera Hintzen	2	0	2
5	18	(United States)	Samar Guidry	2	0	2
5	20	(United States)	Allie Thornton	2	0	2
5	24	(Canada)	Wayny Balata	2	0	2
5		(United States)	Rhea Moore	2	0	2
10	6	(United States)	Heather Stainbrook	1	0	1
10	12	(United States)	Sealey Strawn	1	0	1
10	22	(United States)	Amber Wisner	1	0	1
10	26	(United States)	Tyler McCamey	1	0	1
Total				27	0	27

=== Shutouts ===
As of matches played on May 23, 2026

Rank	No.	Nat.	Name	USLS	Playoffs	Total
1	1	(Canada)	Rylee Foster	4	0	4
1	26	(United States)	Tyler McCamey	4	0	4 (Note: McCamey substituted off, Estrada substituted on, both get credit for the clean sheet)
3	99	(United States)	Samantha Estrada	1	0	1
Total				8	0	8

=== Disciplinary record ===
Player			Regular Season			Playoffs			Other			Total		
No.	Nat.	Name	Yellow card	(yellow card) (yellow-red card)	Red card	Yellow card	(yellow card) (yellow-red card)	Red card	Yellow card	(yellow card) (yellow-red card)	Red card	Yellow card	(yellow card) (yellow-red card)	Red card
2	(United States)	Hannah Davison	5	0	0	0	0	0	0	0	0	5	0	0
5	(United States)	Lauren Flynn	1	1	0	0	0	0	0	0	0	1	1	0
6	(United States)	Heather Stainbrook	3	0	0	0	0	0	0	0	0	3	0	0
10	(United States)	Lexi Missimo	1	0	0	0	0	0	0	0	0	1	0	0
11	(United States)	Maya McCutcheon	1	0	1	0	0	0	0	0	0	1	0	1
12	(United States)	Sealey Strawn	3	0	0	0	0	0	0	0	0	3	0	0
13	(United States)	Cyera Hintzen	3	0	0	1	0	0	0	0	0	4	0	0
14	(England)	Chioma Ubogagu	3	0	0	0	0	0	0	0	0	3	0	0
16	(United States)	Sydney Cheesman	1	0	0	0	0	0	0	0	0	1	0	0
17	(United States)	Gracie Brian	3	0	0	0	0	0	0	0	0	3	0	0
18	(United States)	Samar Guidry	3	1	0	0	0	0	0	0	0	3	1	0
20	(United States)	Allie Thornton	1	0	0	0	0	0	0	0	0	1	0	0
21	(United States)	Camryn Lancaster	1	0	0	0	0	0	0	0	0	1	0	0
22	(United States)	Amber Wisner	6	0	0	0	0	0	0	0	0	6	0	0
24	(Canada)	Wayny Balata	1	0	0	0	0	0	0	0	0	1	0	0
52	(United States)	Caroline Swann	2	0	0	0	0	0	0	0	0	2	0	0
MGR	(England)	Nathan Thackeray	1	0	0	0	0	0	0	0	0	1	0	0
	(Brazil)	Tamara	1	0	0	0	0	0	0	0	0	1	0	0
	(United States)	Chris Petrucelli	2	0	1	0	0	0	0	0	0	2	0	1
Total			40	2	2	1	0	0	0	0	0	41	2	2

== Awards and honors ==
=== USL Super League All League Team ===
Player	Position	Ref
(United States) Amber Wisner	DF	

=== USL Super League Team of the Month ===
Month	Player	Position	Ref
September	(United States) Amber Wisner	MF	
September	(United States) Sealey Strawn	Bench	
November	(United States) Rhea Moore	FW	
December	(England) Chioma Ubogagu	FW	
December	(Canada) Rylee Foster	GK	
December	(United States) Allie Thornton	Bench	
February	(United States) Amber Wisner (2)	DF	
February	(Canada) Wayny Balata	MF	
March	(United States) Heather Stainbrook	MF	
March	(United States) Amber Wisner (3)	Bench	
April	(United States) Amber Wisner (4)	DF	

=== Player of the month ===
Month	Name	Ref
December	(England) Chioma Ubogagu	
