= Sealey Strawn =

American soccer player (born 2007)

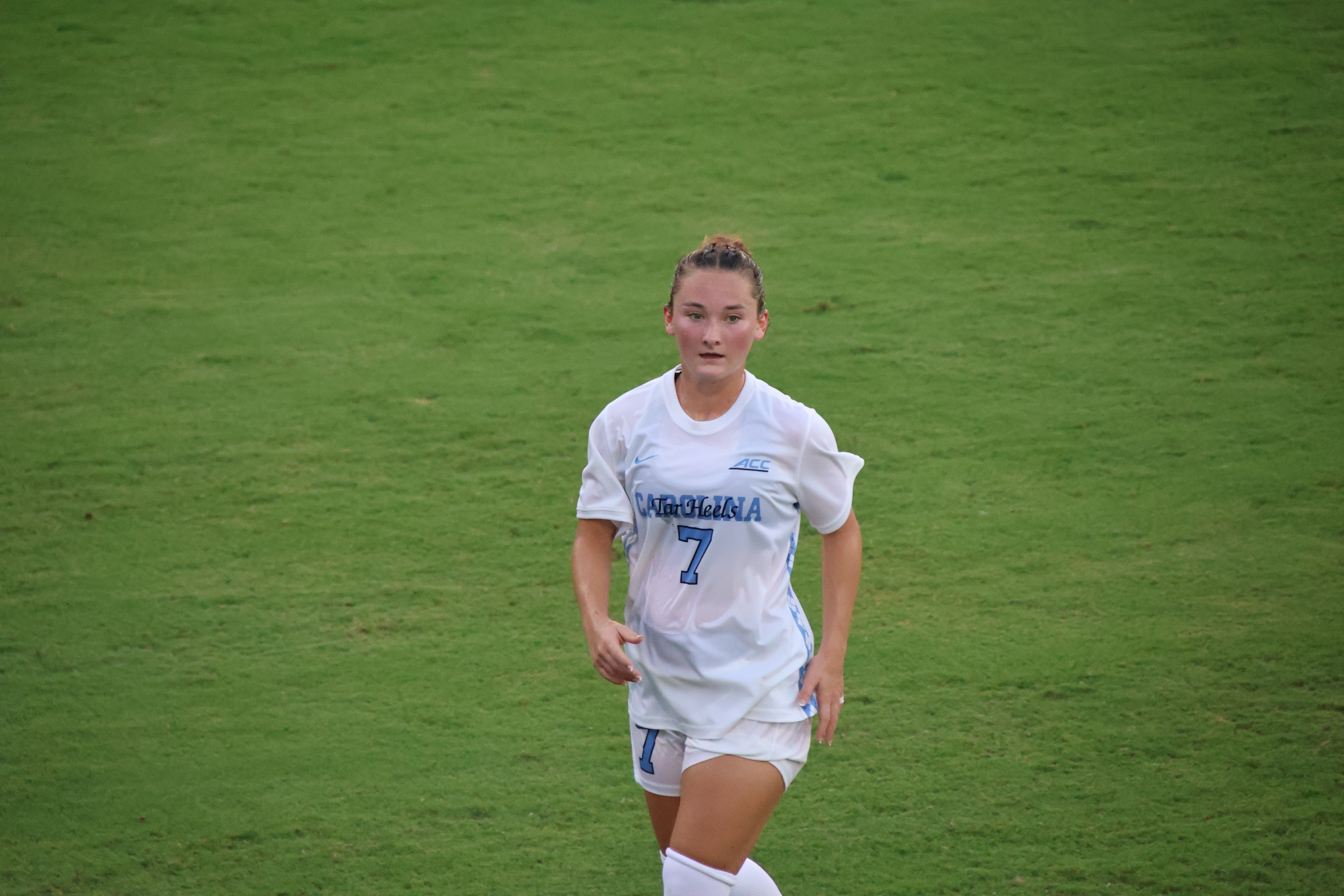
- Strawn with North Carolina in 2026

Personal information
- Full name: Sealey Lynne Strawn
- Date of birth: October 1, 2007 (age 19)
- Height: 5 ft 3 in (1.60 m)
- Position: Forward

Team information
- Current team: North Carolina Tar Heels
- Number: 7

Youth career
- 2020–2026: Solar SC

College career
Years	Team	Apps	(Gls)
2026–	North Carolina Tar Heels		

Senior career*
Years	Team	Apps	(Gls)
2024–2026	Dallas Trinity	44	(9)

International career^{‡}
2020	United States U-15		
2026–	United States U-19	5	(1)
2025–	United States U-20	8	(1)
- * Club domestic league appearances and goals as of May 16, 2026 ‡ National team caps and goals as of September 16, 2026

Sealey Lynne Strawn (born October 1, 2007) is an American college soccer player who plays as a forward for the North Carolina Tar Heels. Previously an academy player for Dallas Trinity, she was the USL Super League Young Player of the Year in 2025.

== Early life ==
Strawn grew up in the Dallas suburb of Prosper, Texas, the daughter of Kelsey and Greg Strawn. She has three siblings, including two adopted from Thailand. At age three, she took after her older brother and began playing soccer. She started out with the local rec team in Tyler, Texas, before joining powerhouse club Solar SC around age 13, where she won ECNL national championships in 2021 and 2023. Her idol growing up was Lionel Messi. She committed to play college soccer for the North Carolina Tar Heels during her junior year. She was ranked by TopDrawerSoccer as the eighth-best prospect in the class of 2026, part of North Carolina's top-ranked recruiting class.

== Club career ==
Strawn began training with the Dallas Trinity at age 17 before the launch of the USL Super League in August 2024. She soon officially signed as an academy player (allowing her to retain college eligibility) while staying active with her youth club Solar SC. She made her first appearance for the Trinity in their exhibition debut at the Cotton Bowl against Barcelona. On September 25, she made her Super League debut as a halftime substitute for Gracie Brian in a 2–0 loss to Brooklyn FC.

On November 2, 2024, Strawn scored her first Super League goal in the 87th minute of the game against Fort Lauderdale United, securing a 1–0 victory. She finished her debut season with 4 goals in 19 games, ranking third in scoring for the Trinity behind Chioma Ubogagu and Allie Thornton. Youth international duty kept her out of their playoff game against the Tampa Bay Sun. Following the season, she was voted the inaugural Young Player of the Year as the league's top player under the age of 23.

On May 16, 2026, Strawn scored twice in a playoff-clinching 4–0 win over Fort Lauderdale United on the final day of the season. She finished her second season as the Trinity's leading scorer with 5 goals in 25 games. In the playoff semifinals, Dallas lost 2–0 to eventual champions Lexington SC. After her second year, Strawn came second in voting for Young Player of the Year behind Ashlyn Puerta. In two seasons in the Super League, she made 45 appearances, including 20 starts, and scored 9 goals.

== International career ==
Strawn played for the United States under-15 team in 2022 and was called up to train at the under-19 level in 2024. She made her under-20 debut at the 2025 CONCACAF Women's U-20 Championship, scoring one goal in two games. She appeared in all four games and scored one goal at the 2026 FIFA U-20 Women's World Cup in Poland; the under-20s lost on penalties to Brazil in the round of 16.

== Career statistics ==
=== Club ===
As of match played on May 23, 2026

Club	Season	League			Playoffs		Total	
Club	Season	Division	Apps	Goals	Apps	Goals	Apps	Goals
Dallas Trinity	2024–25	USLS	19	4	0	0	19	4
Dallas Trinity	2025–26	USLS	25	5	1	0	26	5
Career total			44	9	1	0	45	9

== Honors ==
Individual

- USL Super League Young Player of the Year: 2024–25
