= Camryn Lancaster =

American soccer player (born 2003)

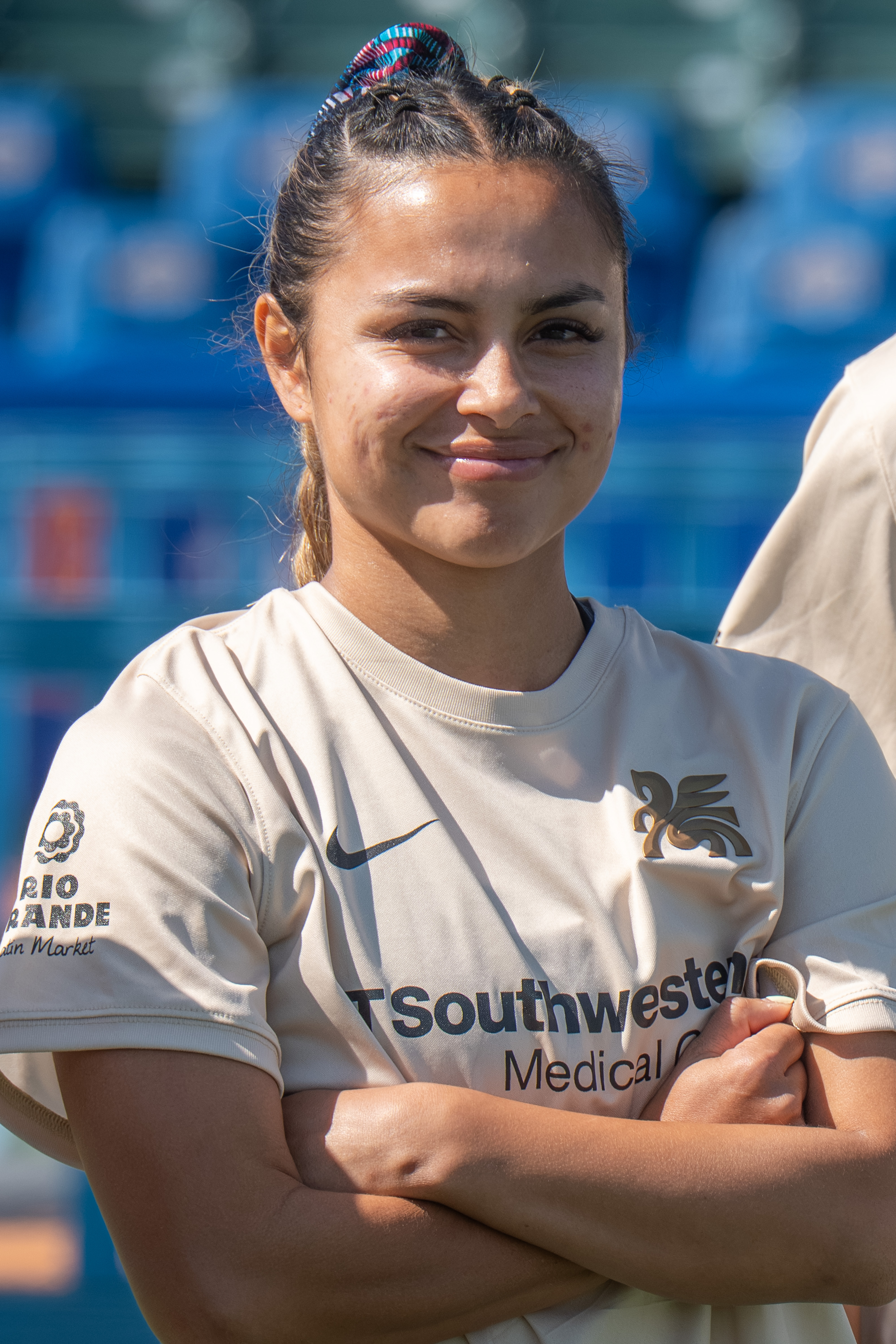
- Lancaster with Dallas Trinity in 2026

Personal information
- Date of birth: April 22, 2003 (age 23)
- Place of birth: Mansfield, Texas, U.S.
- Height: 5 ft 1 in (1.55 m)
- Position: Forward

Team information
- Current team: Dallas Trinity
- Number: 21

Youth career
- Solar SC

College career
Years	Team	Apps	(Gls)
2021–2024	TCU Horned Frogs	83	(19)

Senior career*
Years	Team	Apps	(Gls)
2023–2024	California Storm		
2025–	Dallas Trinity	39	(6)
- * Club domestic league appearances and goals as of 05:17, May 26, 2026 (UTC)

Camryn Lancaster (born April 22, 2003) is an American professional soccer player who plays as a forward for USL Super League club Dallas Trinity. She played college soccer for the TCU Horned Frogs.

== College career ==
=== TCU Horned Frogs ===
Lancaster had a standout freshman year, appearing in every match for the Horned Frogs. On November 11, 2021, she scored the game-winning goal against the Texas Longhorns in the Big 12 conference tournament final. On November 21, 2021, Lancaster scored the equalizing goal in the NCAA Tournament match against Rutgers, forcing the game into penalty kicks, but ultimately fell short.

In 2022, Lancaster helped TCU reach the Big 12 Conference Tournament final for the third straight year, where they fell to West Virginia in extra time. On November 11, during the 2022 NCAA tournament, Lancaster scored the game-winning goal in a second round matchup against Michigan State, sending TCU into the Round of 16 where they would eventually lose to Notre Dame.

She finished her career tied for third in TCU program history with 22 assists and eighth in points (60).

== Club career ==
=== Dallas Trinity ===
Lancaster signed her first professional contract with Dallas Trinity FC in February 2025, joining college teammates Gracie Brian and Jenna Winebrenner. She made her first start and scored her first professional goal on March 9, 2025, scoring the team's second goal in a 6–0 victory over league leaders Brooklyn FC. Ten days later, she scored in another win against Brooklyn, this time by a score of 3–0.

== Career statistics ==
=== College ===
College	Regular Season				Big 12 Tournament		NCAA Tournament		Total	
College	Conference	Season	Apps	Goals	Apps	Goals	Apps	Goals	Apps	Goals
TCU Horned Frogs	Big 12	2021	18	7	3	1	3	1	24	9
TCU Horned Frogs	Big 12	2022	18	4	3	0	3	2	24	6
TCU Horned Frogs	Big 12	2023	18	2	1	0	—		19	2
TCU Horned Frogs	Big 12	2024	11	1	3	1	2	0	16	2
Career total			65	14	10	2	8	3	83	19

=== Club ===
As of matches played on May 23, 2026

Club	Season	League			League Cup		Total	
Club	Season	Division	Apps	Goals	Apps	Goals	Apps	Goals
Dallas Trinity FC	2024–25	USL Super League	13	2	1 (Note: Includes appearances in USL Super League playoffs)	0	14	2
Dallas Trinity FC	2025–26	USL Super League	26	4	1	0	27	4
Career total			39	6	2	0	41	6

== Honors ==
TCU

- 2022 1st-Team All-Big 12
- Ranked No. 23 on TopDrawerSoccer’s Top 100 Freshmen (2021)
- 2021 Big 12 All-Freshman team
- 2021 Big 12 All-Tournament team
