= Maya McCutcheon =

American soccer player (born 2001)

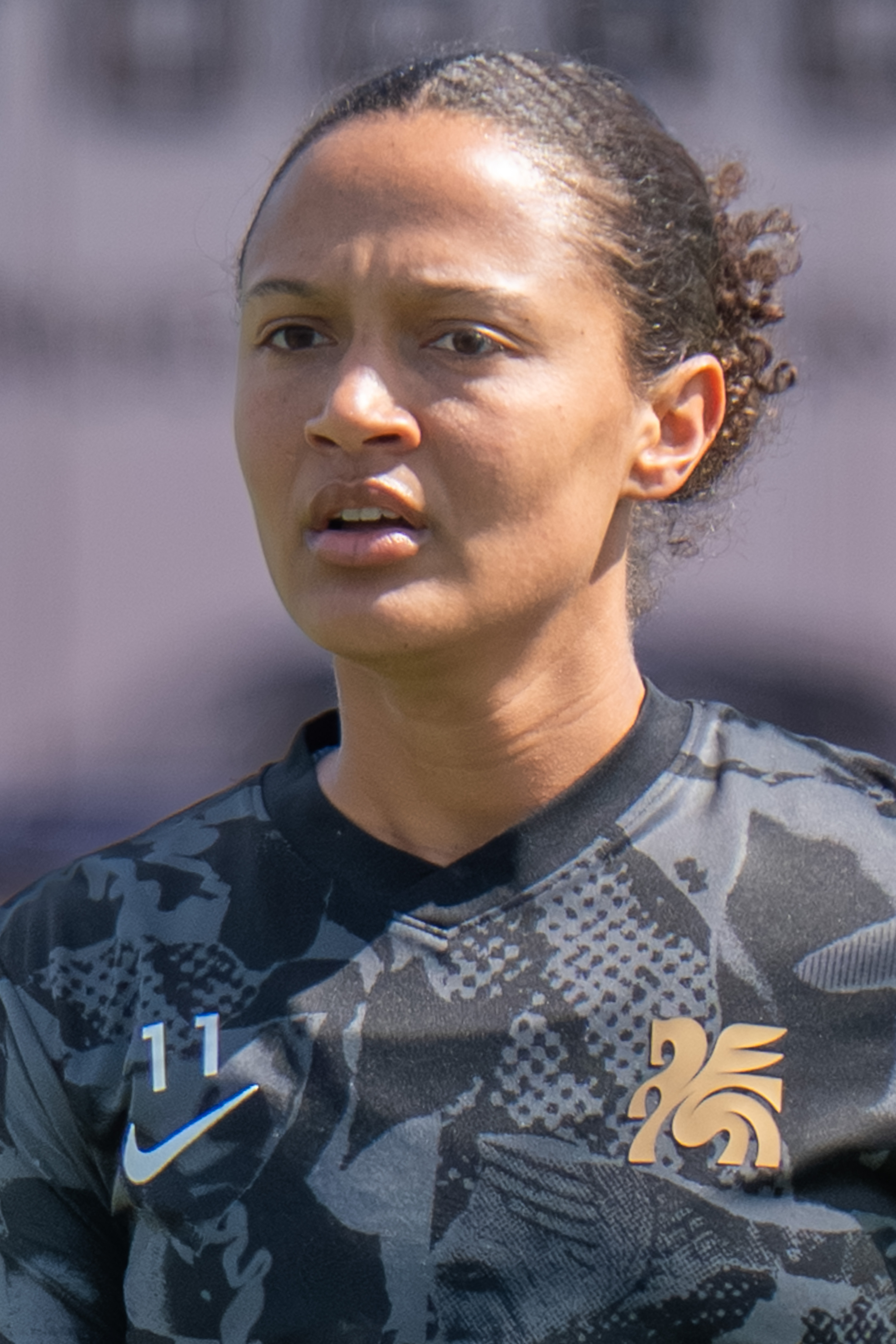
- McCutcheon with the Dallas Trinity in 2026

Personal information
- Full name: Maya Nicole McCutcheon
- Date of birth: April 12, 2001 (age 25)
- Height: 5 ft 9 in (1.75 m)
- Positions: Center back; defensive midfielder

Youth career
- FC Dallas
- Plano East Panthers

College career
Years	Team	Apps	(Gls)
2019–2021	Oklahoma Sooners	35	(3)
2021–2023	West Virginia Mountaineers	62	(6)

Senior career*
Years	Team	Apps	(Gls)
2024	North Carolina Courage	0	(0)
2024–2025	Wellington Phoenix	23	(2)
2025–2026	Dallas Trinity	25	(1)
Total		48	(3)
- * Club domestic league appearances and goals

Maya Nicole McCutcheon (born April 12, 2001) is an American former professional soccer player. She played college soccer for the Oklahoma Sooners and the West Virginia Mountaineers. She played professionally for A-League Women club Wellington Phoenix and USL Super League club Dallas Trinity.

== Early life ==
McCutcheon grew up in the Dallas suburb of Murphy, Texas, one of three children born to Dadario and Melanie McCutcheon. Her father played college football at Tuskegee, and her sister, Daria, played college basketball at Louisiana Tech. She played club soccer for FC Dallas, serving as team captain and winning the ECNL under-16 national championship in 2017. She played high school soccer at Plano East Senior High School and committed to the University of Oklahoma as a sophomore.

== College career ==
McCutcheon spent two seasons with the Oklahoma Sooners, making 35 appearances (27 starts), and was named to the All-Big 12 freshman team after scoring three goals in 2019. She then transferred to West Virginia University, scoring in her debut against Buffalo in 2021. Serving as co-captain for two years, she started all 62 games for West Virginia over three seasons and won the Big 12 tournament in 2022.

== Club career ==
After going undrafted in the 2024 NWSL Draft, McCutcheon trained with Bay FC and the North Carolina Courage in the preseason and was signed to a one-year injury replacement contract with the Courage in March 2024. In August, McCutcheon and fellow replacement signing Victoria Haugen were waived, but one week later, the pair was re-signed for the duration of the 2024 FIFA U-20 Women's World Cup.

On September 16, 2024, McCutcheon left the Courage to sign with A-League Women club Wellington Phoenix. She made her professional debut for the New Zealand club on November 1, starting in their season-opening 4–2 loss to Western United. On November 22, she scored her first professional goal with a header in a 1–0 victory over Adelaide United, the Phoenix's first win of the season. Starting all 23 games at defensive midfielder or center back, she led the Phoenix in minutes played and scored 2 goals as the club missed on qualifying for the finals series.

In July 2025, McCutcheon signed with hometown USL Super League club Dallas Trinity before their second season. She made her club debut on in their season opener on August 23, starting in a 2–1 victory over the Spokane Zephyr. The following week, she scored her first goal for the club with a header to power Dallas to a 2–0 win over Brooklyn FC. She finished the season with 26 appearances, including 19 starts. In the playoffs, she started in a 2–0 loss to eventual champions Lexington SC in the semifinals. On June 2, 2026, she announced her retirement from professional soccer.

== Honors and awards ==
West Virginia Mountaineers

- Big 12 Conference women's soccer tournament: 2022

Individual

- Big 12 all-freshman team: 2019
