= Rhea Moore =

American soccer player (born 2010)

Personal information
- Date of birth: October 9, 2009 (age 17)
- Place of birth: Sacramento, California, U.S.
- Height: 5 ft 8 in (1.73 m)
- Position: Forward

Youth career
- San Juan SC

Senior career*
Years	Team	Apps	(Gls)
2025	Dallas Trinity	9	(2)
- * Club domestic league appearances and goals as of 15:56, April 5, 2026 (UTC)

Rhea Moore (born October 9, 2009) is an American professional soccer player who plays as a forward. In 2025, she became the youngest women's goal scorer in United States professional soccer history, scoring in her debut match for USL Super League club Dallas Trinity FC at age 15. She is committed to play college soccer for the USC Trojans.

== Early life ==
Moore was born and raised in Sacramento, California, as the middle child between two brothers. She started playing soccer at the age of 7, eventually joining San Juan Soccer Club in the Elite Clubs National League (ECNL). She was recognized as one of the top forward prospects in the Class of 2027, earning invitations to regional and national development events. In 2024, she was named ECNL All-Conference for the Northern California region.

== Club career ==
In 2025, Moore signed a USL Academy contract with Dallas Trinity FC of the USL Super League. She made her professional debut at age 15 against Sporting JAX in September 2025, scoring with her left foot to secure a place in history as the youngest women's goal scorer in any U.S. professional match. After the game, Moore said: "I was shocked, but super happy… it was crazy, unreal. I'm super happy and grateful that all my teammates were there and I got this opportunity to play. I'm excited to see what comes." On November 2, 2025, she recorded her first professional assist in a match against DC Power FC. Two weeks later, she scored yet again, this time in a victory over the Spokane Zephyr. Moore was named to the November 2025 USL Super League Team of the Month for her performances across three games. On January 16, 2026, Dallas announced that Moore would be departing from the club. She had made 9 appearances for the Trinity in her first professional season.

== International career ==
Moore has been called up to training camps with the United States under-16 and under-17 youth national teams.
