= Cyera Hintzen =

American soccer player (born 1997)

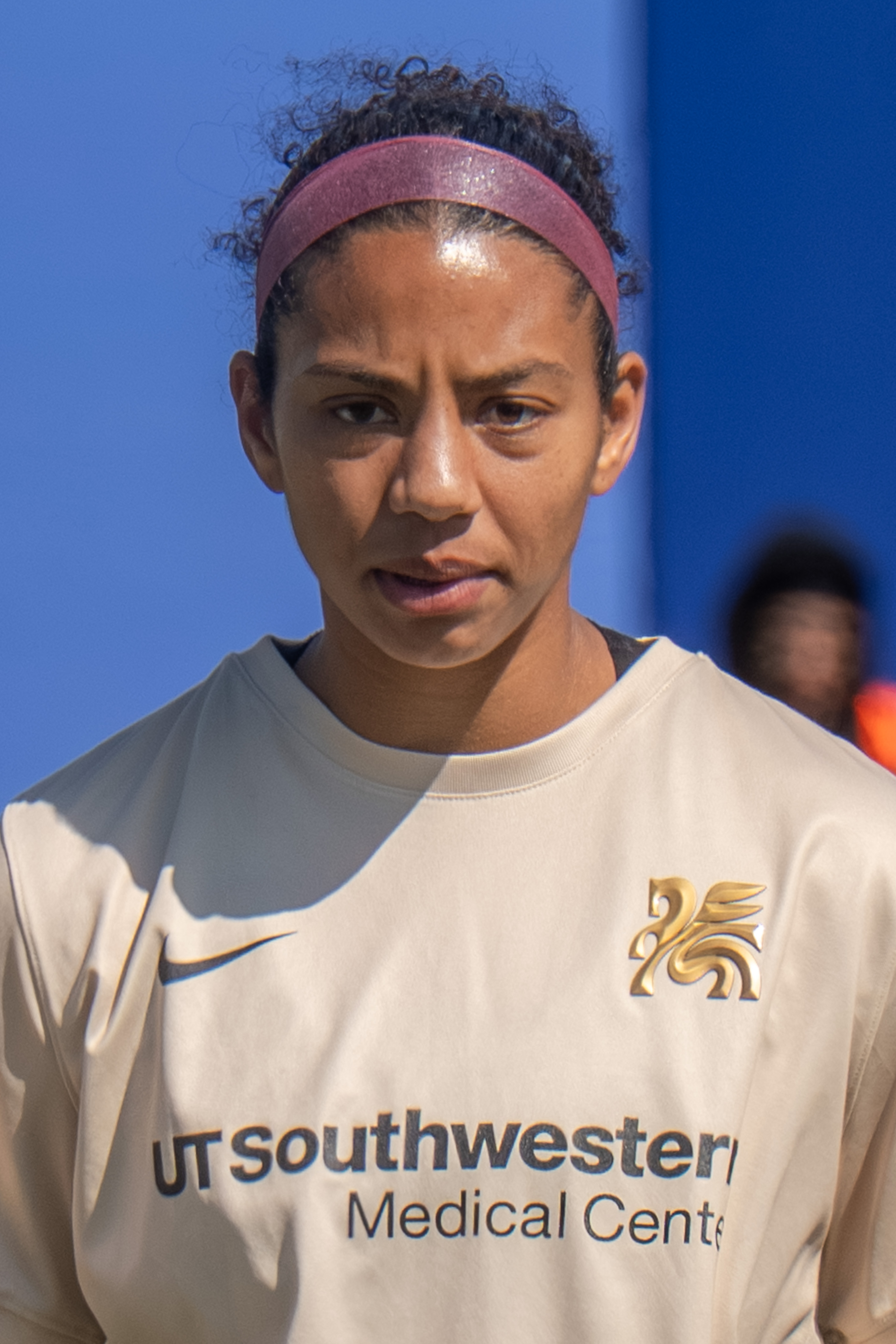
- Hintzen with Dallas Trinity in 2026

Personal information
- Full name: Cyera Makenzie Hintzen
- Date of birth: October 28, 1997 (age 29)
- Place of birth: Garland, Texas
- Height: 5 ft 5 in (1.65 m)
- Positions: Left back; forward

Team information
- Current team: Dallas Trinity
- Number: 13

Youth career
- Dallas Sting

College career
Years	Team	Apps	(Gls)
2016–2019	Texas Longhorns	72	(27)

Senior career*
Years	Team	Apps	(Gls)
2021–2022	Valur	24	(12)
2021–2023	Perth Glory	27	(11)
2023	NJ/NY Gotham FC	0	(0)
2024–	Dallas Trinity	53	(2)

International career
2015	United States U-19		
- * Club domestic league appearances and goals as of 05:16, May 26, 2026 (UTC)

Cyera Makenzie Hintzen (born October 28, 1997) is an American professional soccer player who plays as a left back or forward for USL Super League club Dallas Trinity. She played college soccer for the Texas Longhorns.

== College career ==
=== Texas Longhorns ===
Hintzen was highly recruited out of high school. She received offers from: SMU, Oklahoma, TCU and UCLA among others. However, she decided to join the University of Texas, where she was regarded as one of the team's most important players.

During her college career, Hintzen earned numerous accolades including Big 12 Conference Offensive Player of the Year (2018), Freshman of the Year (2016), and All-Big 12 Conference First Team honors in 2017 and 2018. Hintzen also led the Longhorns in goals and assists in 2017 and 2018.

== Club career ==
Hintzen was selected 31st overall in the 2020 NWSL Draft by the Utah Royals, Hintzen became the second University of Texas player ever to be drafted by an NWSL team. However, due to the COVID-19 pandemic, the NWSL cancelled the 2020 regular season.

=== Valur & Perth Glory ===
Between 2021 and 2023, Hintzen played in two leagues with opposite seasons: Valur in Iceland and Perth Glory in Australia.

==== Valur ====
Hintzen signed her first professional contract with Icelandic club Valur, contributing to the team's consecutive league titles in 2021 and 2022. She made her professional debut on July 6, 2021, as a 59th-minute substitute in a 2–1 victory over Selfoss. Later that month, she scored her first professional goal against Fylkir in the 17th minute. Hintzen recorded her first career brace on August 20, 2021, during a third place match in the UEFA Women's Champions League qualifying round against Zürich.

During the 2022-23 UEFA Women's Champions League qualifying rounds, Hintzen scored two goals, helping Valur advance to the second round, where they were eliminated by Slavia Prague.

==== Perth Glory ====
Hintzen signed with Australian club Perth Glory in September 2021. She scored her first club goal during her debut on January 1, 2022, in a 4–2 loss to Adelaide United. Hintzen was Perth's top scorer for the 2021–22 season with five goals and was named A-League Players' Player of the Year in her second season.

=== Gotham FC ===
In July 2023, Hintzen signed with NJ/NY Gotham FC on a National Team replacement contract and made two appearances for Gotham in the NWSL Challenge Cup.

=== Dallas Trinity FC ===
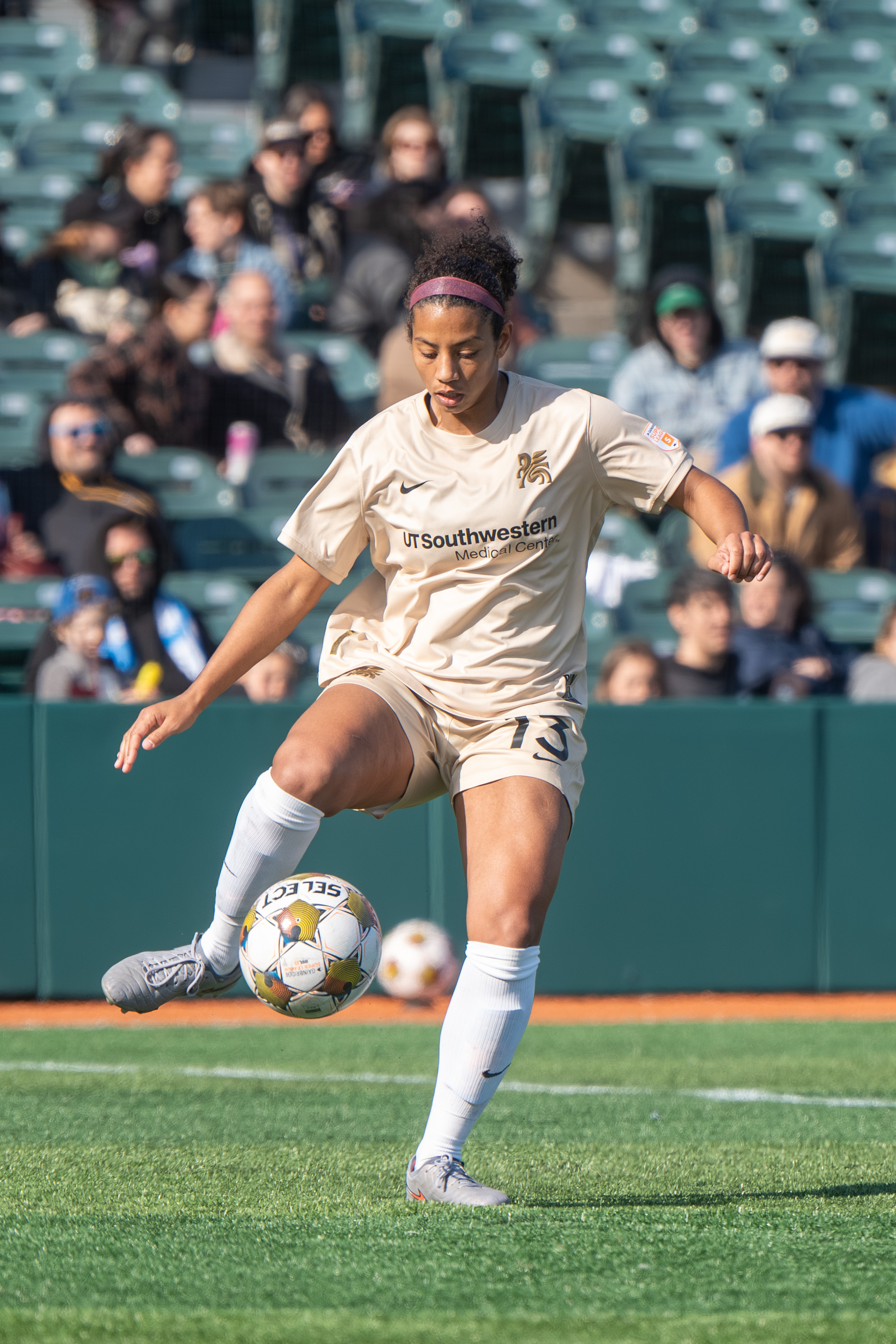
Hintzen with the Dallas Trinity in 2026

Hintzen returned to Texas in July 2024, signing with Dallas Trinity ahead of the inaugural USL Super League season, joining college teammate Haley Berg in the process. She made her club debut in Dallas's inaugural match on August 18, 2024, entering as a substitute in the 57th minute against Tampa Bay Sun FC.

Hintzen scored her first goal for the club on November 9, 2024, in an away game against Lexington SC. Her goal contributed to a comeback victory, as Dallas overcame a two-goal deficit to win 3-2, with Hintzen also assisting Gracie Brian's decisive goal. Hintzen scored her second goal on April 6, 2025, once against playing away against Lexington.

== International career ==
Hintzen was called up to the United States under-19 team in 2015.

== Style of play ==
Hintzen mainly operates as a striker and has been described as her "physical upper body strength combined with pace and sharpness in front of goal have marked her out". She is left-footed.

== Personal life ==
Hintzen is a native of Garland, Texas, United States. She went to and played for Sachse High School, helping them make the Class 6A regional playoffs in her senior year.

== Career statistics ==
=== College ===
College	Regular Season				Big 12 Tournament		NCAA Tournament		Total	
College	Conference	Season	Apps	Goals	Apps	Goals	Apps	Goals	Apps	Goals
Texas Longhorns	Big 12	2016	13	2	—		—		13	2
Texas Longhorns	Big 12	2017	17	7	1	0	3	3	21	10
Texas Longhorns	Big 12	2018	18	10	2	0	1	0	21	10
Texas Longhorns	Big 12	2019	15	5	1	0	1	0	17	5
Career total			63	24	4	0	5	3	72	27

=== Club ===
As of match played on May 23, 2026

Club	Season	League			League Cup		Domestic Cup (Note: Includes appearances in Icelandic Women's Football Cup, Icelandic Women's Football Super Cup, and NWSL Challenge Cup)		International Cup (Note: Includes appearances in UEFA Women's Champions League)		Total	
Club	Season	Division	Apps	Goals	Apps	Goals	Apps	Goals	Apps	Goals	Apps	Goals
Valur	2021	Besta deild kvenna	10	4	—		1	0	2	2	13	6
Valur	2022	Besta deild kvenna	14	8	—		4	4	4	2	22	14
Perth Glory	2021–22	A-League	9	5	—		—		—		9	5
Perth Glory	2022–23	A-League	18	6	—		—		—		18	6
NJ/NY Gotham FC	2023	NWSL	0	0	—		2	0	—		2	0
Dallas Trinity FC	2024–25	USL Super League	25	2	1	0	—		—		26	2
Dallas Trinity FC	2025–26	USL Super League	28	0	1	0	—		—		29	0
Career total			104	25	2	0	7	4	6	4	119	33

== Honors and awards ==
Valur

- Besta deild kvenna: 2021, 2022
- Icelandic Women's Football Cup: 2022
- Icelandic Women's Football Super Cup: 2022

NJ/NY Gotham FC

- NWSL Championship: 2023

Individual

- Big 12 Conference Offensive Player of the Year: 2018
- Perth Glory A-League Women's Most Glorious Player: 2022–23
- Perth Glory A-League Players' Player of the Year: 2022–23
