= Samantha Estrada =

American soccer goalkeeper (born 2000)

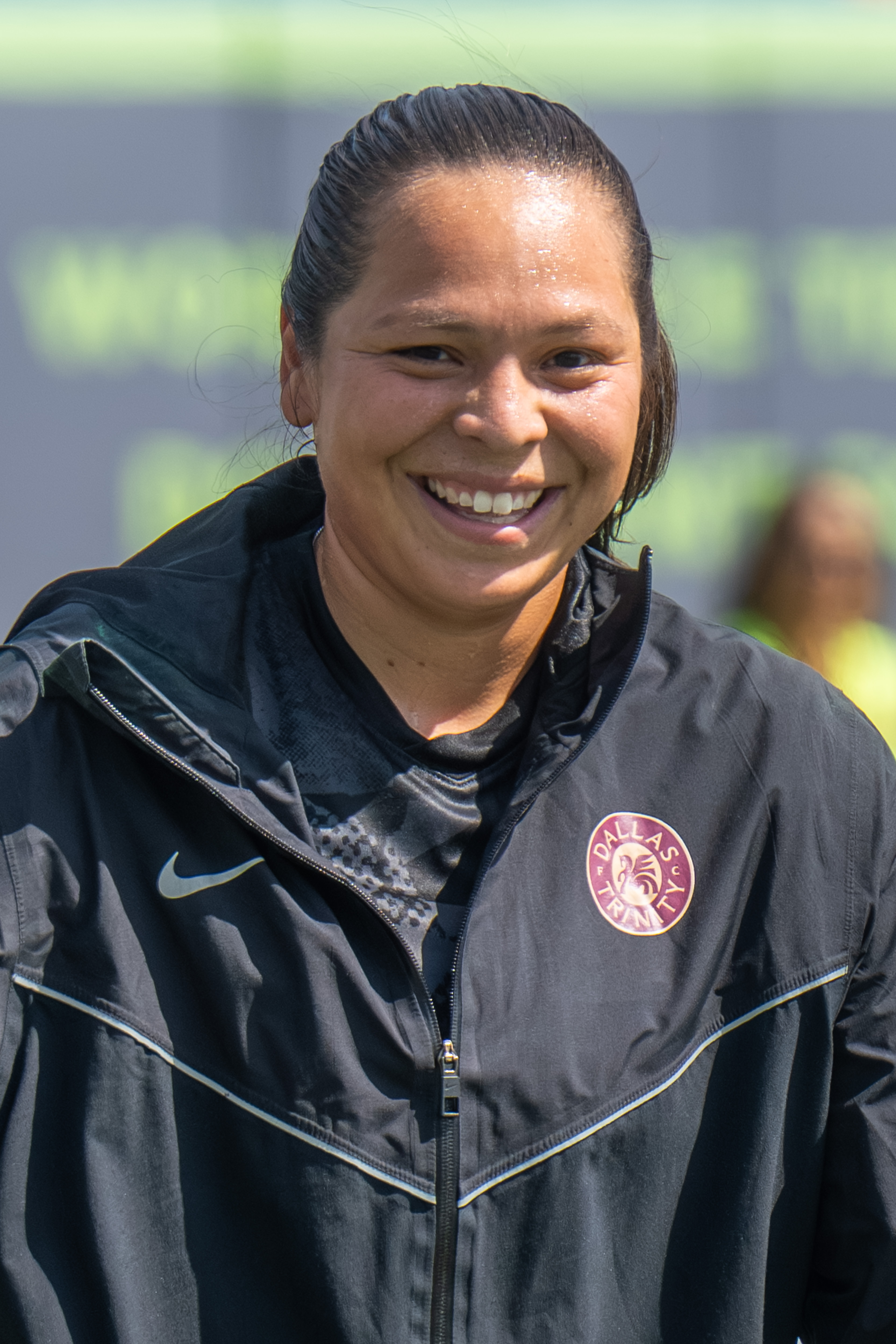
- Estrada with the Dallas Trinity in 2026

Personal information
- Full name: Samantha Victoria Estrada
- Date of birth: July 7, 2000 (age 26)
- Place of birth: El Paso, Texas, U.S.
- Height: 6 ft 0 in (1.83 m)
- Position: Goalkeeper

Youth career
- New Mexico Rush
- Texas Rush
- Houston Dash DA

College career
Years	Team	Apps	(Gls)
2018–2023	SMU Mustangs	50	(0)

Senior career*
Years	Team	Apps	(Gls)
2024	AHFC Royals	9	(0)
2024–2026	Dallas Trinity	5	(0)
- * Club domestic league appearances and goals as of 19:41, February 22, 2026 (UTC)

Samantha Victoria Estrada (born July 7, 2000) is an American former professional soccer player who played as a goalkeeper. She played college soccer for the SMU Mustangs before spending two seasons playing professionally for USL Super League club Dallas Trinity FC.

== Early life ==
At twelve, Estrada began playing soccer with the New Mexico Rush. She later joined the Texas Rush, a ten-hour drive from her home in El Paso, and lived with a host family during three-week stays.

Estrada later join the Houston Dash's Development Academy and was invited to a U18 USWNT camp in October 2017.

== College career ==
Estrada received a full scholarship to Southern Methodist University (SMU) in 2018, where she played for six years in the American Athletic Conference (AAC). She experienced three ACL tears—first in her freshman year in 2018, then again in 2019, and for a third time in 2022 before her final season. Despite these injuries and three subsequent surgeries, Estrada recorded 175 career saves with the Mustangs, ranking 10th in program history. She also ranks 6th in save percentage and 7th in goals against average.

During the 2021 NCAA Division I women's soccer tournament, Estrada achieved a shutout against Texas, helping SMU advance to the second round for the first time since 2006.

In 2021, Estrada signed a Name, Image, and Likeness (NIL) deal with Sam's Club, reportedly valued at $10,000.

== Club career ==
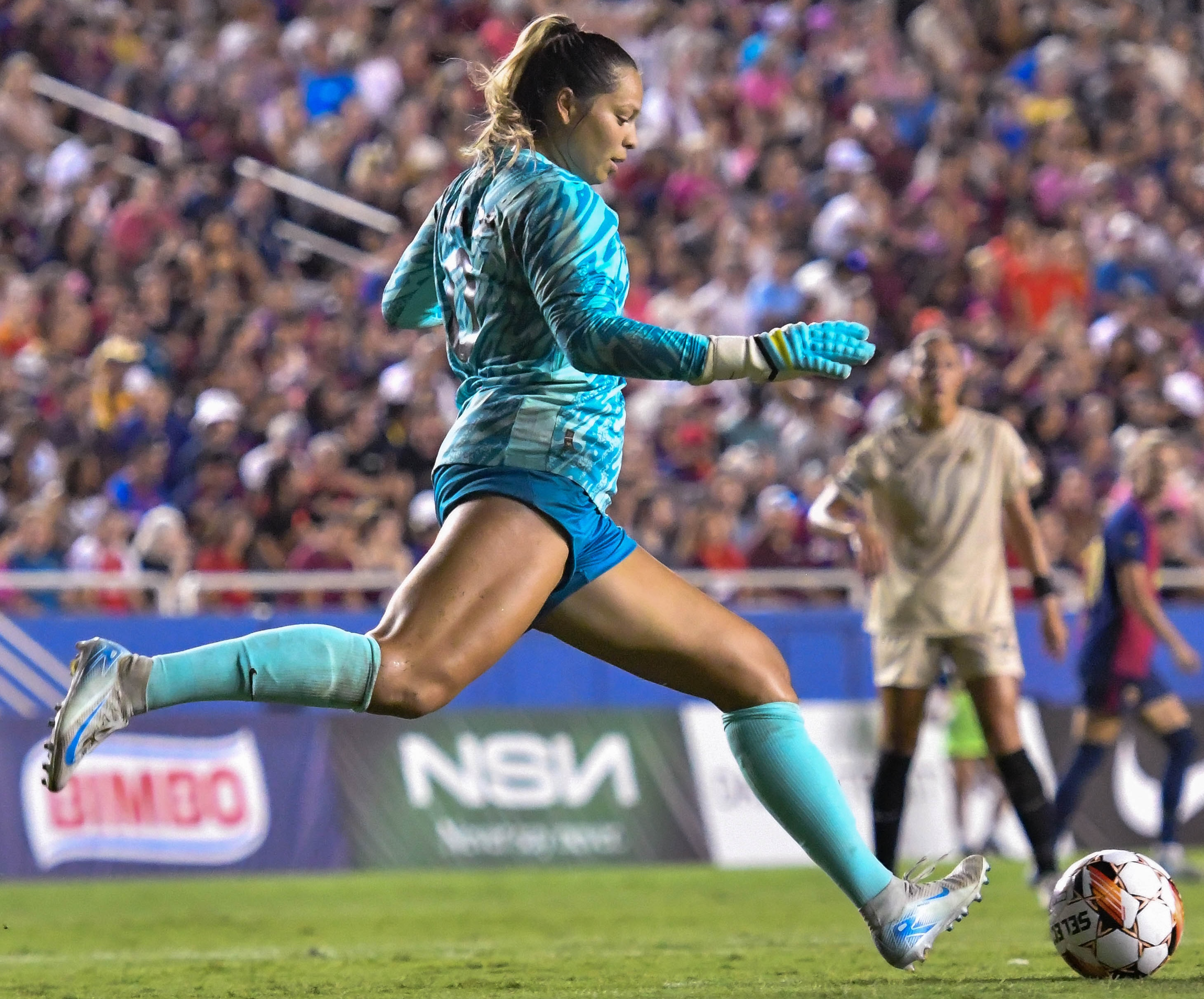
Estrada with Dallas Trinity in 2024

After college, Estrada entered the 2024 NWSL Draft but was not selected. Afterwards, she joined AHFC Royals, a Houston-based team in the USL W League. The Royals completed the 2024 season undefeated, conceding only four goals across ten games. Estrada played her final match with the team on June 21, 2024.

Estrada signed her first professional contract with Dallas Trinity FC on June 11, 2024, joining her former SMU teammate, Allie Thornton. Estrada was the club's fifth overall signing and made her professional debut in Dallas Trinity's inaugural match against Tampa Bay Sun FC on August 18, 2024. After spending two seasons in Dallas, Estrada retired from professional soccer in June 2026.

== Personal life ==
Estrada was born in El Paso, Texas, and later completed high school in The Woodlands, near Houston. She earned a Bachelor of Science degree from Southern Methodist University in 2021, followed by two Master's degrees, one in Sports Management and the other in Business Administration.

Estrada's father was also a goalkeeper who played with the Dallas Burn.

== Career statistics ==
=== Club ===
As of matches played on February 7, 2026

Club	Season	League			Other		Total	
Club	Season	Division	Apps	Goals	Apps	Goals	Apps	Goals
AHFC Royals	2024	USL W League	9	0	—		9	0
Dallas Trinity FC	2024–25	USL Super League	3	0	1	0	4	0
Dallas Trinity FC	2025–26	USL Super League	2	0	0	0	2	0
Career total			14	0	1	0	15	0
