= Solar SC =

Soccer club in Allen, Texas, U.S.

- Founded: 1976; 50 years ago
- Ground: Allen, Texas, United States
- Website: solarsoccerclub.net

Solar Soccer Club is an American youth soccer club based in the Dallas suburb of Allen, Texas. It is a member of the Elite Clubs National League (ECNL).

== History ==
Solar was founded in 1976. In 2010, its chairman since 1996 resigned after being accused of stealing more than US$800,000 from the club.

Solar has become one of the most-recruited-from clubs for colleges in the United States. Its head women's coach from 2007 to 2020 was Derek Missimo, who led players including his daughter, Lexi, to national championship games every year after 2016. Solar won the ECNL Girls Overall Club Championship in 2021–22.

== Notable people ==
=== Players ===
- Emeri Adames
- Corben Bone
- Haley Berg
- Messiah Bright
- Trinity Byars
- Reggie Cannon
- Kenny Cooper
- Blaine Ferri
- Kennedy Fuller
- Johan Gomez
- Jonathan Gómez
- Amet Korça
- Camryn Lancaster
- Ainsley McCammon
- Weston McKennie
- Lexi Missimo
- Samantha Meza
- Drew Moor
- Riley Parker
- Jaedyn Shaw
- Collin Smith
- Taylor Smith
- Allie Thornton
- Jonathan Tomkinson
- Taryn Torres
- Alan Winn
