= Atlético Dallas =

Men's soccer club based in Garland, Texas

- Founded: November 19, 2024; 22 months ago
- Stadium: Cotton Bowl
- Capacity: 92,100
- Owners: Sam Morton; Matt Valentine
- Head coach: Peter Luccin
- League: USL Championship
- Website: atleticodallas.com
Home colors	Away colors

Atlético Dallas is a planned American men's professional soccer team based in the Greater Dallas area. Founded in 2024, the team plans to make its debut in the USL Championship as early as 2027.

== History ==
On November 19, 2024, the USL awarded an expansion team to the city of Garland, Texas. The ownership group consists of Matt Valentine, Sam Morton, Luther Ott and Dan McAlone, the group having previously attempted to purchase USL Championship club Las Vegas Lights FC to relocate to Dallas, but having been denied by league officials. Kyle Martino joined the ownership group on September 9, 2025.

In partnership with Renegades Soccer Club, a local youth soccer academy, USL Dallas on April 10, 2025, established their youth academy system. Mas+ was announced as the sponsor for the kit until the brand folded.

On May 2, 2025, the club revealed its name and logo, with the name inspired by La Liga club Atlético Madrid.

For the 2025 fall season, their reserve team Atlético Dallas II played in the UPSL.

On February 11, 2026, Atlético Dallas named former Atlético Madrid player and FC Dallas head coach Peter Luccin as the club's inaugural first team manager.

On June 30, 2026, the club announced that they had bought USL Super League team Dallas Trinity FC.

Mexican striker Javier Hernández was announced as the team's first player on July 27, 2026, signing a two-year contract with a club option for a third season.

== Stadium ==
=== Cotton Bowl ===
Atlético Dallas are due to play in the Cotton Bowl, a 92,100-capacity stadium in Dallas, on the site of the State Fair of Texas. They plan to share the stadium with fellow United Soccer League club Dallas Trinity FC, a women's professional soccer club that competes in the USL Super League, and will be the third professional men's soccer club to play in the Cotton Bowl, following the NASL's Dallas Tornado and the MLS' FC Dallas.

From their inaugural season, the club are planned to start a three-year lease in the stadium, ending in 2029. In addition with the lease, the City of Dallas propose to also lease off the MoneyGram Soccer Complex in Northwest Dallas to Atlético Dallas for further club use, which will break the lease the city previously had with FC Dallas ownership earlier than expected. The move, which was unanimously approved by city council, was cited to have been made due to the previous contract losing the city millions of dollars due to lackluster revenue streams and high utility costs.

=== Proposed Garland stadium ===
Following the announcement, a site in Garland was identified by USL Dallas as a site to place a soccer complex, where they would create a complex that would include a 10,000 seat soccer stadium. Although plans to play matches in the Cotton Bowl have caused the planned stadium to be downsized to 2,000 seats, the additional parts of the proposed soccer complex are still in development, which includes eight soccer fields and a multipurpose building, with potential to follow with mixed development on the site. The complex, in addition to hosting the men's professional team practice facility, will also be the home for the club's youth academy.

However, as of September 2025, Garland decided not to continue stadium plans as they did not see a large enough return on the investment.

== Colors and badge ==
The crest is a black shield containing a rattlesnake, representing speed and danger, battling a Mexican wolf, representing cunning and teamwork. The club's colors are described as Blackland Crude, Texas Topaz, and Silver Ore.
