= Allie Thornton =

American soccer player (born 1997)

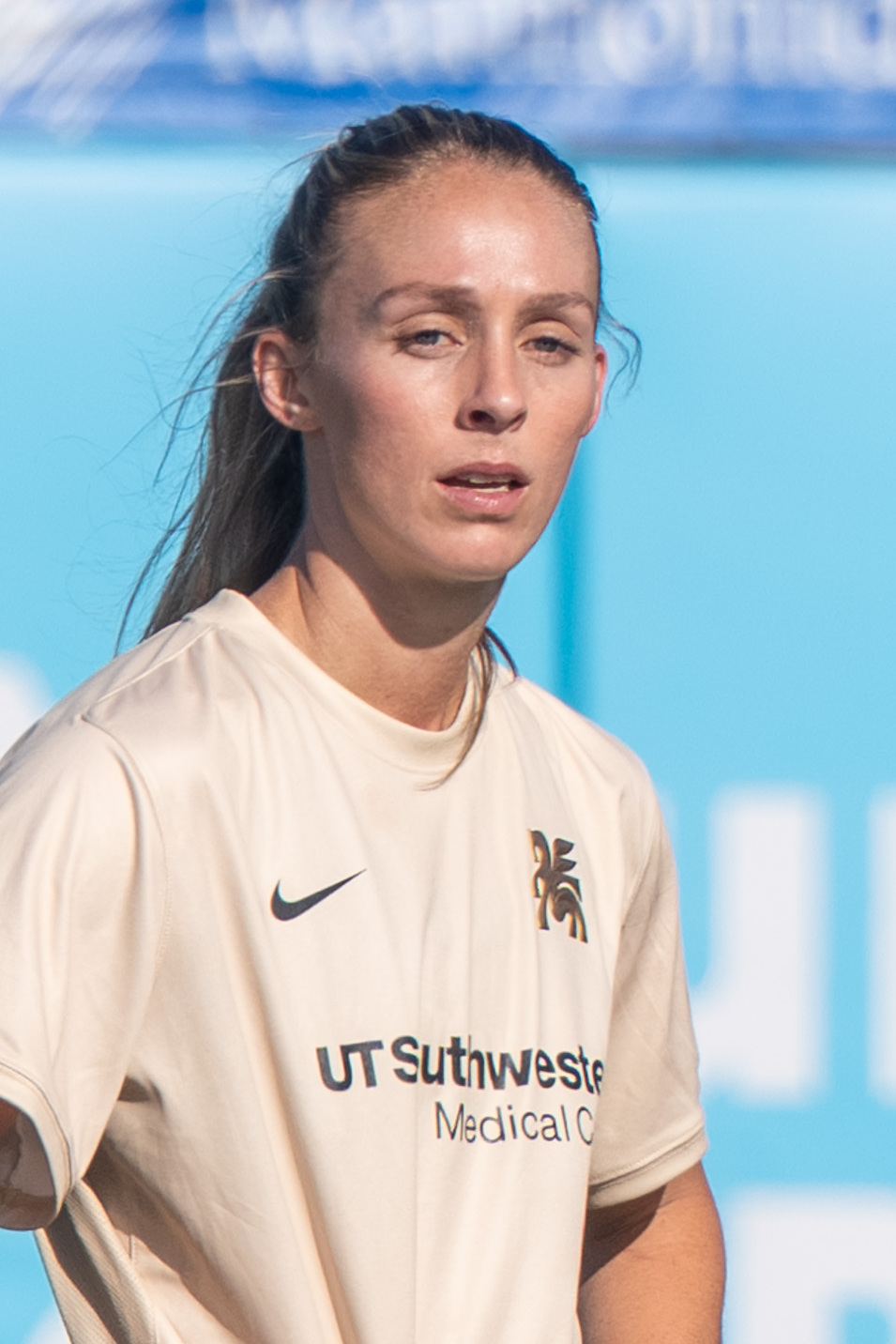
- Thornton with Dallas Trinity in 2026

Personal information
- Full name: Alexis Taylor Thornton
- Date of birth: December 2, 1997 (age 28)
- Place of birth: Arlington, Texas, U.S.
- Height: 5 ft 11 in (1.80 m)
- Position: Forward

Team information
- Current team: Newcastle Jets
- Number: 11

Youth career
- Solar Chelsea 98 ECNL

College career
Years	Team	Apps	(Gls)
2016–2019	SMU Mustangs	79	(37)

Senior career*
Years	Team	Apps	(Gls)
2020–2021	Le Havre	23	(2)
2021–2022	Issy	22	(2)
2022–2024	RSC Anderlecht	55	(10)
2024–2026	Dallas Trinity	53	(17)
2026–	Newcastle Jets	0	(0)
- * Club domestic league appearances and goals as of May 26, 2026

Alexis Taylor Thornton (born December 2, 1997) is an American professional soccer player who plays as a forward for Newcastle Jets. Thornton played college soccer for the SMU Mustangs, earning first-team All-AAC honors four times. She spent her first three professional seasons in France with Le Havre and Issy. In 2022, she moved to RSC Anderlecht in Belgium, where she won two league titles. Two years later, she joined the newly formed USL Super League club Dallas Trinity and won the inaugural USL Super League Golden Boot.

== Early life ==
Thornton was born in Arlington, Texas, to Kelli and Jim Thornton. She played youth soccer with Solar Chelsea 98 (now Solar Chelsea SC). Thornton attended Kennedale High School, where she helped lead the team to their first Texas 4A State Championship victory in 2015, recording 38 goals and 22 assists in the process. Kennedale repeated as champions in 2016, winning consecutive state titles.

== College career ==
In 2016, Thornton joined the SMU Mustangs. She earned numerous accolades, including first-team All-American Athletic Conference in every season and multiple All-Region honors, highlighted by a standout four-goal game against Northern Colorado in 2019. Shen played a total 79 games, starting in 78, and scored 37 goals with 9 assists throughout her collegiate career. Thornton ranks 9th in SMU program history for goals scored.

== Club career ==
=== Le Havre ===
Thornton signed with French club Le Havre in January 2020. Thornton has French citizenship, acquired through her father, which made her eligible to join the team without requiring a work visa. She made her professional debut on January 19, 2020, in a 0–2 defeat against Thonan Evian. Just a week later, she got her first professional goal, scoring in the 51st minute during a 2–1 victory over FF Yzeure.

On March 12, 2020, the 2019–20 season was suspended by the French Football Federation, due to the COVID-19 pandemic in France. The season was then subsequently cancelled a month later on April 16, 2020, and La Havre were awarded promotion to the Première Ligue. Once the 2020–21 season commenced, Thornton made her Première Ligue debut in an away match against Issy on September 5, 2020. She contributed to the team's 4–0 victory by scoring a goal in the 53rd minute and providing an assist.

=== Issy ===
Thornton transferred to Issy in August 2021. She made her debut in a league match against Soyaux on August 28, 2021. Thornton scored her first goal for Issy on February 22, 2022, in a league match against Stade de Reims in a 3–4 loss.

=== Anderlecht ===
Belgian club Anderlecht announced the signing of Allie Thornton on July 7, 2022. Thornton had an immediate impact, scoring twice against Polish side UKS SMS Łódź on August 18, 2022, during the 2022–23 UEFA Women's Champions League. One of her goals came in injury time, securing a 3–2 come from behind victory. Anderlect would end up losing in the next round to KuPS on penalties. Thornton earned another brace for Anderlect on September 30, 2022, in a league match against KRC Genk in a 4–2 away victory. Anderlect ended the season as league champions, earning qualification for the Champions League. In April 2023, Thornton extended her contract an additional year.

Thornton played in both games for Anderlect in the 2023–24 UEFA Women's Champions League. Anderlect advanced in their first match against Katowice but lost 0–3 against Norwegian club, Brann.

=== Dallas Trinity ===
In June 2024, Thornton became the fourth player to sign with Dallas Trinity FC before the USL Super League's inaugural season. College teammate, Samantha Estrada, joined a few days later. She made her club debut in Dallas's inaugural match against Tampa Bay on August 18, 2024. She was selected to the inaugural USL Super League Team of the Month for August 2024. On September 13, 2024, Thornton become the first player in league and club history to score a hat trick which was also a perfect hat trick in a 6–2 home win over Lexington. On March 9, 2025, she scored twice within three minutes in a 6–0 victory over then league leaders Brooklyn. Ten days later, she scored another goal against Brooklyn, this time by a score of 3–0. On April 19, 2025, she scored her tenth goal in a 1–1 home draw against Fort Lauderdale, becoming the first player in club and league history to reach double digits. On May 31, 2025, she opened scoring in the season finale against the Carolina Ascent, helping her team to a 2–1 win that clinched a playoff berth for Dallas. It brought her to 13 goals in 27 games, breaking a tie with Mia Corbin to win the inaugural USL Super League Golden Boot.

The following year, Thornton's production dropped off slightly, as she scored 4 goals in her 27 league appearances. She helped the Trinity qualify for the playoffs for the second consecutive season, where they were beaten by eventual champions Lexington SC in the quarterfinals. On June 4, 2026, Dallas announced Thornton's departure at the end of the season.

=== Newcastle Jets ===
In September 2026, Thornton joined Australian A-League Women club Newcastle Jets.

== Personal life ==
Thornton graduated from Southern Methodist University with a bachelor's degree in Applied Physiology and Sports Management.

== Career statistics ==
=== College ===
Team	Season	Regular season			AAC Tournament		NCAA Tournament		Total	
Team	Season	Division	Apps	Goals	Apps	Goals	Apps	Goals	Apps	Goals
SMU Mustangs	2016	AAC	18	10	3	0	1	0	22	10
SMU Mustangs	2017	AAC	18	3	2	1	—		20	4
SMU Mustangs	2018	AAC	16	9	1	1	—		17	10
SMU Mustangs	2019	AAC	18	12	2	1	—		20	13
Total			70	34	8	3	1	0	79	37

=== Club ===
As of matches played on May 23, 2026

Club	Season	League			League Cup		Domestic Cup (Note: Includes appearances in Coupe de France Féminine)		Continental (Note: Includes appearances in UEFA Women's Champions League)		Total	
Club	Season	Division	Apps	Goals	Apps	Goals	Apps	Goals	Apps	Goals	Apps	Goals
Le Havre AC	2019–20	Seconde Ligue	5	1	—		—		—		5	1
Le Havre AC	2020–21	Première Ligue	18	1	—		1	0	—		19	1
Issy	2021–22	Première Ligue	22	2	—		—		—		22	2
Issy	Total		45	4	0	0	1	0	0	0	46	4
RSC Anderlecht	2022–23	Belgian Women's Super League	30	10	—		—		2	2	32	12
RSC Anderlecht	2023–24	Belgian Women's Super League	25	0	—		—		2	0	27	0
RSC Anderlecht	Total		55	10	0	0	0	0	4	2	59	12
Dallas Trinity FC	2024–25	USL Super League	27	13	1 (Note: Includes appearances in USL Super League playoffs)	0	—		—		28	13
Dallas Trinity FC	2025–26	USL Super League	25	4	1	0	—		—		26	4
Dallas Trinity FC	Total		53	17	2	0	0	0	0	0	55	17
Career total			148	30	1	0	1	0	4	2	154	32

== Honors ==
Anderlecht

- Super League: 2022–23, 2023–24
- Belgian Women's Cup: 2022

Individual

- AAC Conference First-Team: 2016, 2017, 2018, 2019
- USL Super League Golden Boot: 2024–25
- USL Super League Team of the Month, August 2024 December 2025
- USL Super League Team of the Month, December 2024
