= Lauren Flynn =

American soccer player (born 2002)

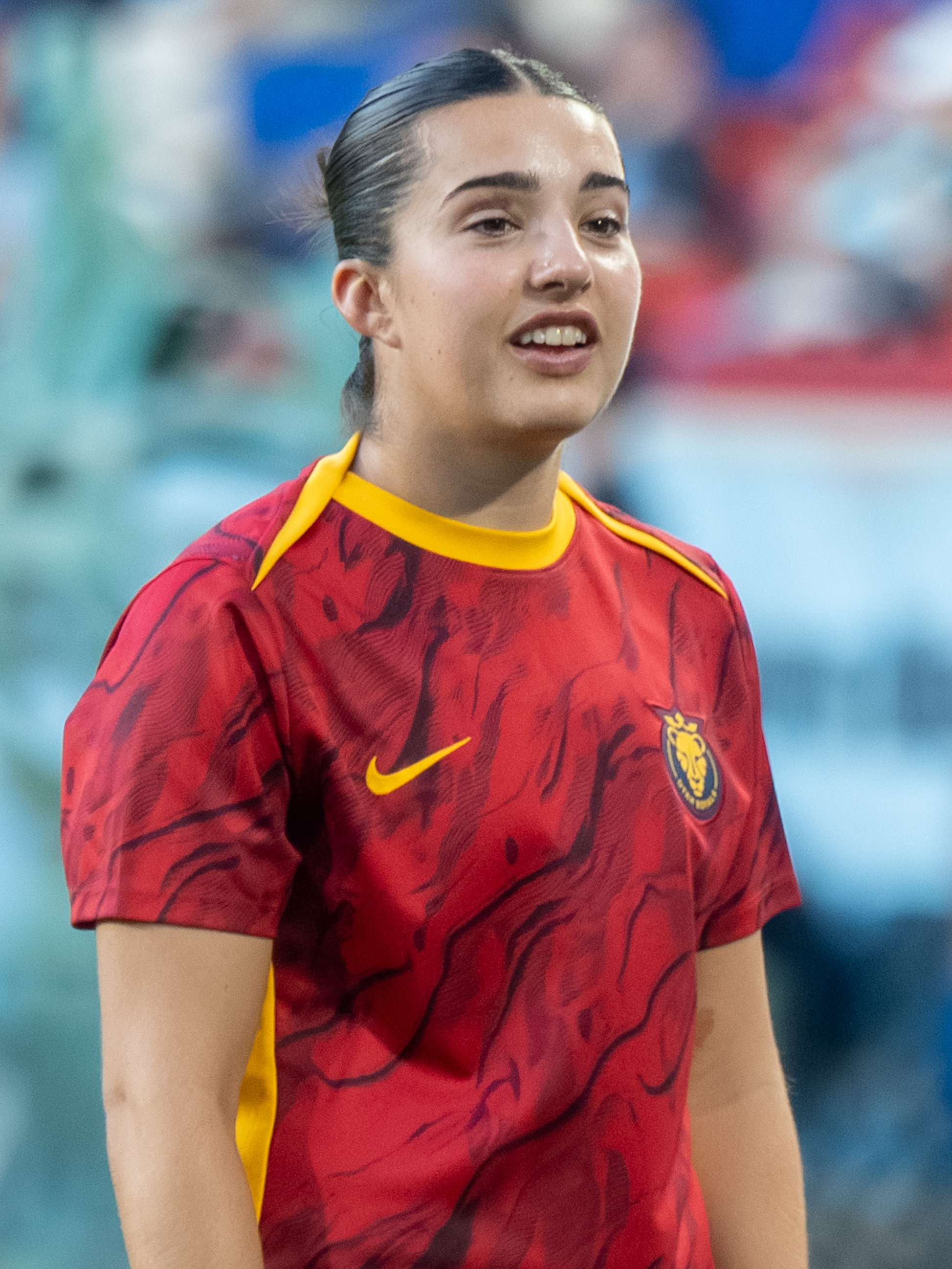
- Flynn with the Utah Royals in 2025

Personal information
- Full name: Lauren Elizabeth Flynn
- Date of birth: May 22, 2002 (age 24)
- Place of birth: Arlington, Virginia, U.S.
- Height: 5 ft 6 in (1.68 m)
- Position: Center back

Team information
- Current team: Dallas Trinity
- Number: 5

College career
Years	Team	Apps	(Gls)
2020–2023	Florida State Seminoles	79	(7)

Senior career*
Years	Team	Apps	(Gls)
2024–2025	Utah Royals	21	(0)
2026–	Dallas Trinity	9	(2)

International career^{‡}
2022	United States U-20	11	(0)
2023–2025	United States U-23	4	(0)
- * Club domestic league appearances and goals as of 05:15, May 26, 2026 (UTC) ‡ National team caps and goals as of June 2, 2025

Lauren Elizabeth Flynn (born May 22, 2002) is an American professional soccer player who plays as a center back for USL Super League club Dallas Trinity. She played college soccer for the Florida State Seminoles, winning two national championships (2021 and 2023). She was drafted by the Utah Royals in the second round of the 2024 NWSL Draft. She represented the United States at the youth international level, appearing at the 2022 FIFA U-20 Women's World Cup.

== Early life ==
Flynn was born and raised in Arlington County, Virginia, one of three daughters born to Chris and Debby Flynn. Her older sister, Meghan, played college soccer at Tennessee, and her younger sister, Moira, plays for Miami. Flynn played high school soccer as a forward at Yorktown High School, scoring 66 goals in three seasons, winning two state championships, and earning first-team all-state honors. She played ECNL club soccer for McLean Youth Soccer. Not highly recruited out of high school, Flynn committed to Florida State in her senior year.

== College career ==
Flynn made 10 appearances as a freshman, primarily as a substitute, before the fall season was shortened due to the COVID-19 pandemic. Head coach Mark Krikorian then moved her from winger to center back in the spring portion of the season, where she started all five games alongside Emily Madril as the Seminoles reached the final of the NCAA tournament, losing to Santa Clara on penalties. She started all 25 games in her sophomore season in 2021, helping Florida State return to the NCAA tournament final, this time winning on penalties against BYU. She was named third-team Best XI by TopDrawerSoccer.

Flynn remained at Florida State as Brian Pensky, who formerly coached one of her sisters at Tennessee, replaced Krikorian in 2022. She started 22 games and reached the semifinals of the NCAA tournament, being named second-team TopDrawerSoccer Best XI. During her senior season, Flynn featured in attack for senior night against NC State and scored a hat trick to double her career scoring total. She then won her fourth consecutive ACC tournament. She started all 23 games in the 2023 season and played nearly every minute of every game. She anchored a defense that allowed just one goal during the NCAA tournament as Florida State became undefeated national champions, with Flynn being named the tournament's Most Outstanding Defensive Player and first-team TopDrawerSoccer Best XI.

== Club career ==
=== Utah Royals ===
Flynn was drafted by expansion team Utah Royals with the 16th overall pick in the second round of the 2024 NWSL Draft. She was signed to a one-year contract with the option to extend an additional year. She made her professional debut on April 20, 2024, starting against Racing Louisville. She won NWSL Save of the Week after the May 25 game against the Kansas City Current for her last-ditch header to deflect Temwa Chawinga's shot on goal. However, her rookie season ended prematurely after she was diagnosed with bilateral compartment syndrome that was causing incessant pain in her calves. Utah placed her on the season-ending injury list on August 28, 2024, and she underwent surgery. Up to that point, Flynn had led the Royals in combined tackles and interceptions through 12 games, starting 10.

In September 2024, Utah exercised Flynn's contract option for 2025. The following season, after over nine months out of action, she returned to the pitch for the Royals on April 25, 2025, replacing an injured Claudia Zornoza in the first half of their 1–0 loss to the Houston Dash. She finished the season with 9 appearances, starting 6.

=== Dallas Trinity ===
On January 20, 2026, USL Super League club Dallas Trinity announced that they had signed Flynn before the spring part of the season. Flynn made her Super League debut on January 31, participating in a draw with Brooklyn FC to kick off the second half of Dallas' season. The following match, she scored her first USL Super League goal as Dallas beat Fort Lauderdale United FC, 4–0.

== International career ==
Flynn was first called up to the United States national under-20 team in December 2021, arriving at training camp just after winning her first NCAA championship. She appeared in six of seven games for the team at the 2022 CONCACAF Women's U-20 Championship, where they shut out all their opponents to win the tournament. She was selected to the roster for the 2022 FIFA U-20 Women's World Cup, where they lost in the group stage. She played friendlies with the national under-23 team in 2023 and 2025.

== Honors and awards ==
Florida State Seminoles

- NCAA Division I women's soccer tournament: 2021, 2023
- ACC women's soccer tournament: 2020, 2021, 2022, 2023

United States U-20

- CONCACAF Women's U-20 Championship: 2022

Individual

- NCAA Division I Women's Soccer Tournament Most Outstanding Player: 2023
