= Wayny Balata =

Canadian soccer player (born 2001)

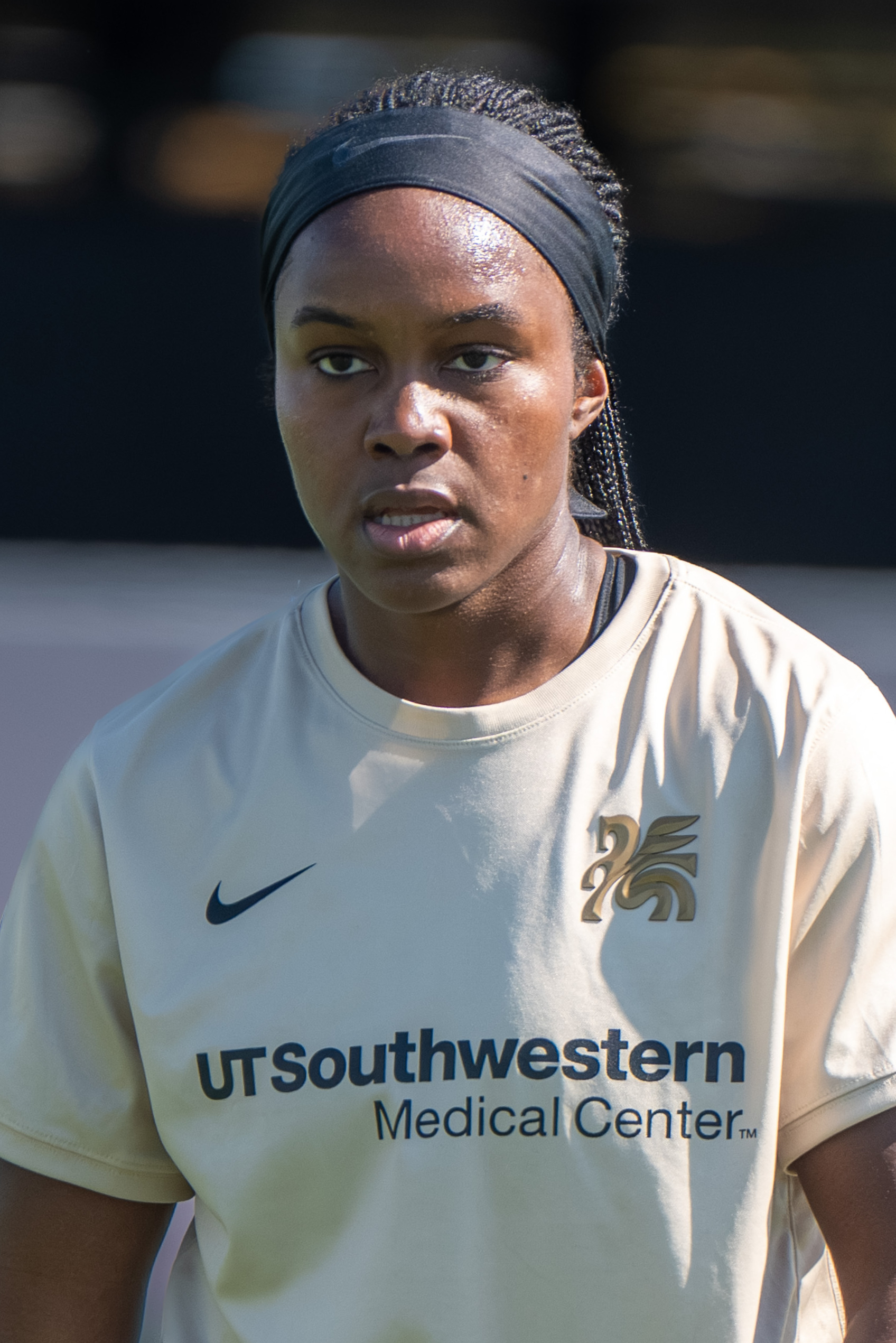
- Balata with the Dallas Trinity in 2026

Personal information
- Full name: Wayny Natasha Balata-Nguenign
- Date of birth: June 25, 2001 (age 25)
- Place of birth: Montreal, Quebec, Canada
- Height: 1.71 m (5 ft 7 in)
- Position: Midfielder

Team information
- Current team: Dallas Trinity
- Number: 24

Youth career
- Lakeshore SC
- Notre-Dame-De-Grâce SA

College career
Years	Team	Apps	(Gls)
2019–2023	SMU Mustangs	56	(16)

Senior career*
Years	Team	Apps	(Gls)
2018	Lakers du Lac St-Louis	5	(1)
2024–2025	Spokane Zephyr	10	(0)
2025–	Dallas Trinity	22	(2)

International career^{‡}
2018	Canada U17	8	(0)
2020	Canada U20	3	(0)
- * Club domestic league appearances and goals as of 18:33, April 19, 2026 (UTC) ‡ National team caps and goals as of 18:33, April 19, 2026 (UTC)

Wayny Natasha Balata-Nguenign (born June 25, 2001) is a Canadian professional soccer player who plays as a midfielder for Dallas Trinity FC in the USL Super League. She played college soccer for the SMU Mustangs, and previously represented Canada at youth international level, including at the 2018 FIFA U-17 Women's World Cup.

== Early life ==
Balata was born and raised in Montreal, Quebec, Canada. She initially took up basketball, influenced by her two older brothers, before her father introduced her to soccer at a park near their apartment. She quickly fell in love with the sport and went on to represent regional and provincial teams, eventually earning a place in the Canadian youth national team setup.

Balata played her youth club soccer with Lakeshore SC and Notre-Dame-De-Grâce SA in the Montreal area. With the Quebec provincial team, which she captained from the age of 14, she was named Canada's Top Player, made all-star teams, and won a gold medal. Her club teams also won back-to-back gold medals at the Canadian National Championships in 2016 and 2017, and a silver medal in 2018. She attended Collège de Montréal and Notre Dame de Montréal, where she was named 2016 Student Athlete of the Year and MVP.

In 2018, Canada Soccer included Balata as one of eight in their Women’s EXCEL Program. That year, she also was named to Canada's squad for that year's CONCACAF Women's U-17 Championship.

== College career ==
Balata joined Southern Methodist University in 2019 to play for the SMU Mustangs in NCAA Division I. In her freshman season, she played in 18 and started 17 matches, logging 1,454 minutes, scoring two goals and tallying two assists, and was named to the AAC All-Rookie Team. She also earned a spot on the AAC All-Academic Team in 2019–20.

During this time, she represented Canada as a midfielder for the 2020 CONCACAF Women's U-20 Championship.

Balata was named to the All-AAC Second Team in 2021. Her collegiate career at SMU was interrupted by injuries and the COVID-19 pandemic, which extended her eligibility. In her graduate season of 2023 she served as team captain and was named to the AAC Championship All-Tournament Team after scoring two goals in the semifinal victory over Florida Atlantic, including the game-winning goal in the 8th minute via penalty kick. Across her five-year collegiate career, Balata finished with 16 goals and 5 assists in 56 matches.

== Club career ==
In 2018, she played with Lakers du Lac St-Louis in the Première ligue de soccer du Québec. In 2020, she was set to join CS Mont-Royal Outremont, but did not end up playing that season.

In 2024, Balata was on the initial list for the NWSL draft.

Following her college career, Balata signed with Spokane Zephyr FC for the inaugural 2024–25 USL Super League season. She made 10 appearances for the club during the inaugural season.

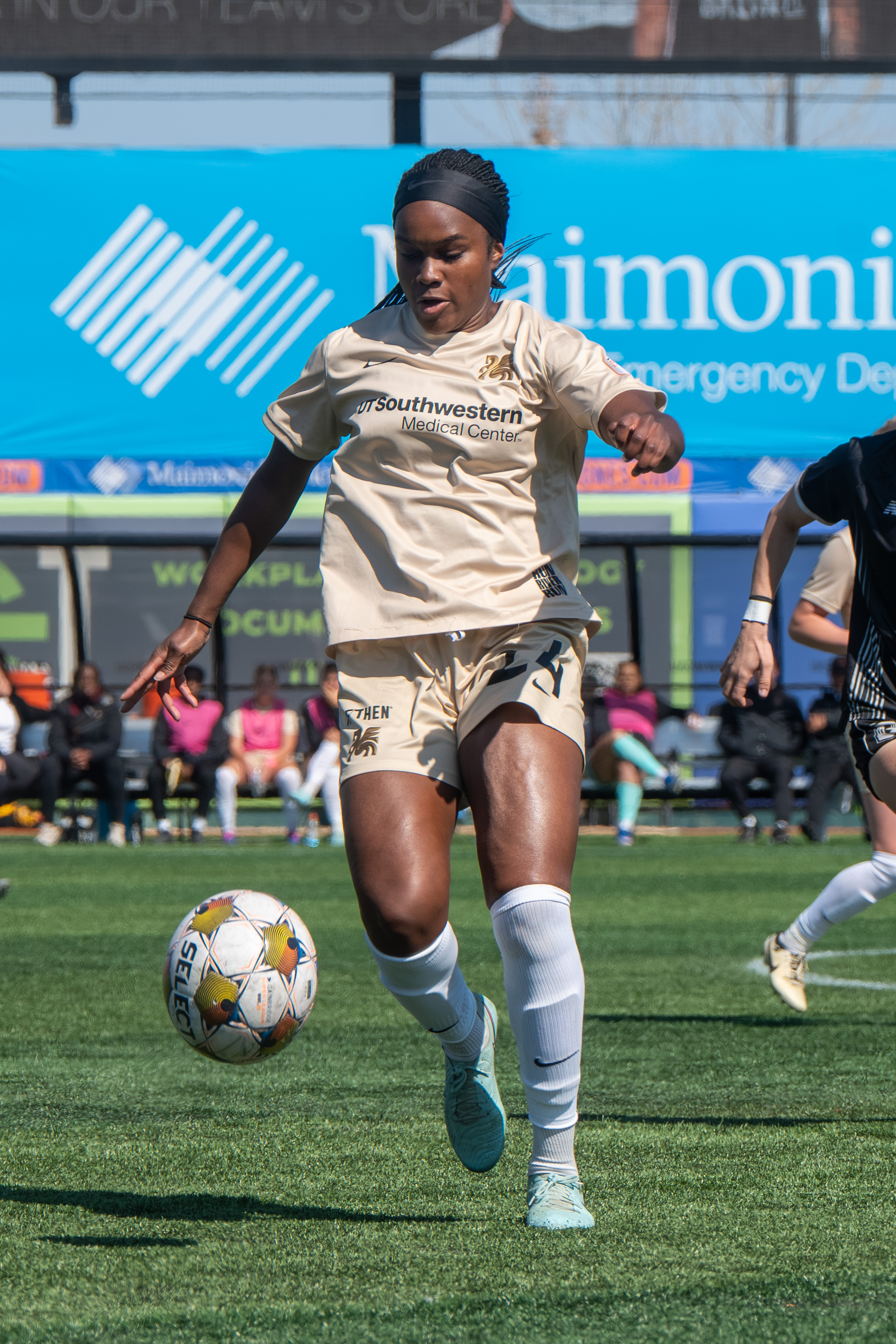
Balata during Brooklyn FC vs Dallas Trinity FC on Apr 12, 2026

In 2025, Balata signed with Dallas Trinity FC, returning to the Dallas–Fort Worth area where she had played her college soccer She made an immediate impact, scoring the equalizing goal in the 48th minute of Dallas Trinity's season-opening 2–1 comeback win over Spokane Zephyr FC on August 23, 2025. In February 2026, Balata scored her second goal and second assist of the season in a 4–0 win at Fort Lauderdale United FC, earning her a nomination for Goal of the Month. She was subsequently named to the USL Super League Team of the Month for February 2026.

== International career ==
Balata represented Canada at the U-17 level, playing every game at the 2018 FIFA U-17 Women's World Cup in Uruguay, where Canada finished fourth — their best ever finish at the tournament. She had also previously represented Canada's U-17s at the CONCACAF Women's U-17 Championship, where they won the bronze medal and qualified for the World Cup. Balata also represented Canada at the 2020 CONCACAF Women's U-20 Championship in the Dominican Republic.

== Honours ==
Individual

- AAC All-Rookie Team: 2019
- All-AAC Second Team: 2021
- AAC Championship All-Tournament Team: 2023
- USL Super League Team of the Month: February 2026
