= Sydney Cheesman =

American soccer player (born 2004)

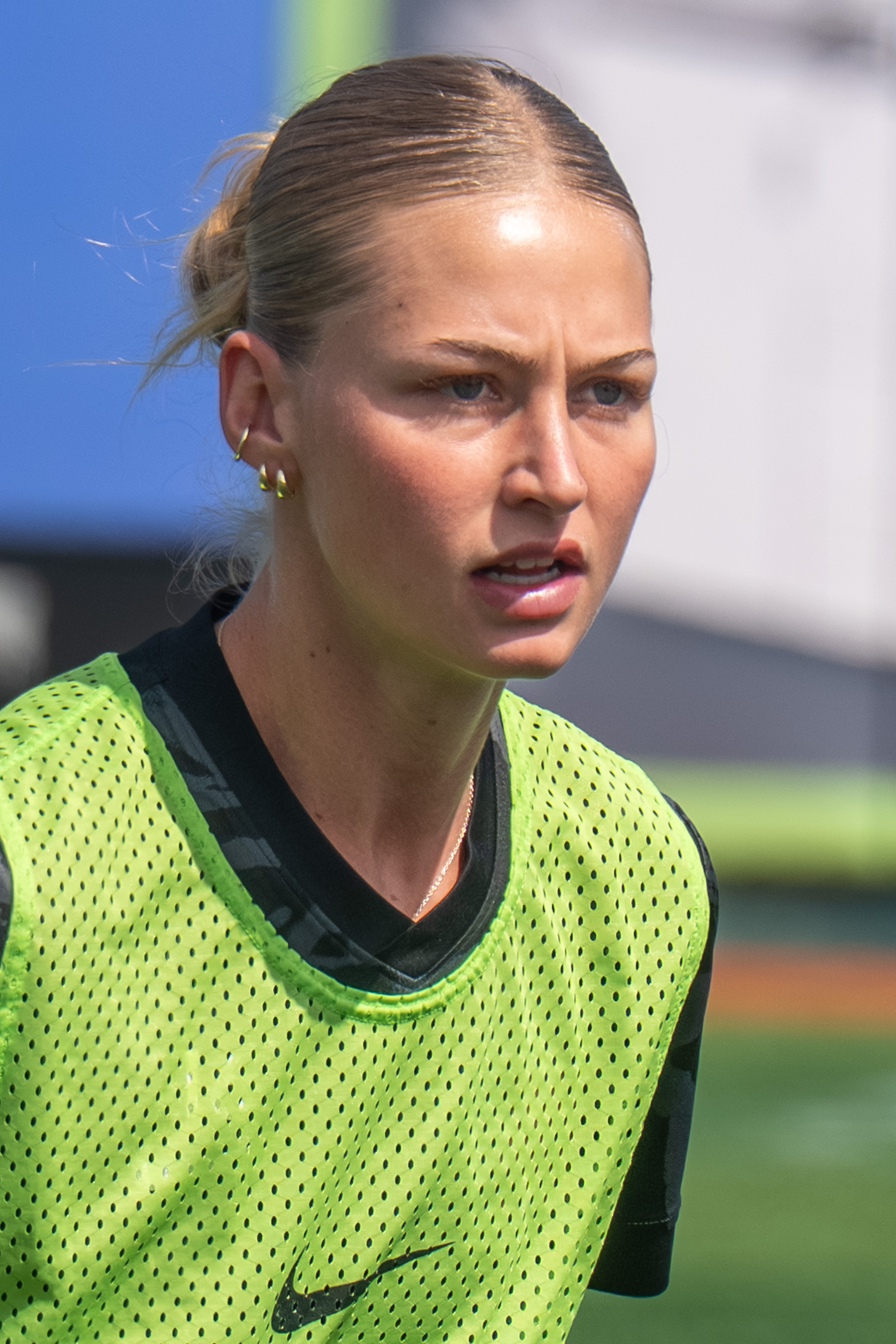
- Cheesman with the Dallas Trinity in 2026

Personal information
- Full name: Sydney Kaye Cheesman
- Date of birth: March 17, 2004 (age 22)
- Height: 5 ft 6 in (1.68 m)
- Position: Defender

Team information
- Current team: Dallas Trinity
- Number: 16

Youth career
- Colorado Rush

College career
Years	Team	Apps	(Gls)
2022–2023	North Carolina Tar Heels	9	(0)
2024–2025	LSU Tigers	44	(2)

Senior career*
Years	Team	Apps	(Gls)
2021–2022	Colorado Rush		
2023	Indios Denver		
2024–2025	Colorado Storm	13	(2)
2026–	Dallas Trinity	8	(0)

International career
2020	United States U-16		
2022	United States U-20		
- * Club domestic league appearances and goals

Sydney Kaye Cheesman (born March 17, 2004) is an American professional soccer player who plays as a defender for USL Super League club Dallas Trinity. She played college soccer for the North Carolina Tar Heels and the LSU Tigers.

== Early life ==
Cheesman grew up in Lafayette, Colorado. She attended Centaurus High School, where she played soccer. She committed to play college soccer for the North Carolina Tar Heels during her junior year. She played club soccer for the Colorado Rush.

== College career ==
Cheesman made 9 appearances for the North Carolina Tar Heels over two seasons. North Carolina reached the national championship game in 2022 and the quarterfinals in 2023. She then transferred to the LSU Tigers before her junior year in 2024, where she immediately became a constant presence at center back or fullback. After her junior year, she was named third-team All-SEC and the All-Louisiana Newcomer of the Year. In her senior year in 2025, she was a second-team All-SEC pick after helping the Tigers match their program best win total. She helped LSU reach the SEC tournament final (converting a penalty in the shootout loss) and advance to their first-ever round of 16 in the NCAA tournament. She finished her LSU career with 44 appearances, 2 goals, and 7 assists. During college, she also played for Colorado Rush and Indios Denver in the Women's Premier Soccer League, and the Colorado Storm in the USL W League, scoring in the latter's loss in the national championship in 2024.

== Club career ==
Cheesman was a non-roster trialist with the Portland Thorns in the 2026 preseason. She signed her first professional contract with USL Super League club Dallas Trinity in March 2026.

== International career ==
Cheesman played for United States under-16 team at the UEFA Under-16 Development Tournament in 2020. Following a hiatus during the COVID-19 pandemic, she made several training camps with the under-20 team including friendlies between 2021 and 2023. She was called up to the under-23 team at the start of 2026.

== Honors and awards ==
North Carolina Tar Heels

- Atlantic Coast Conference: 2022

Individual

- Second-team All-SEC: 2025
- Third-team All-SEC: 2024
