= Nathan Thackeray =

English soccer coach (born 1988)

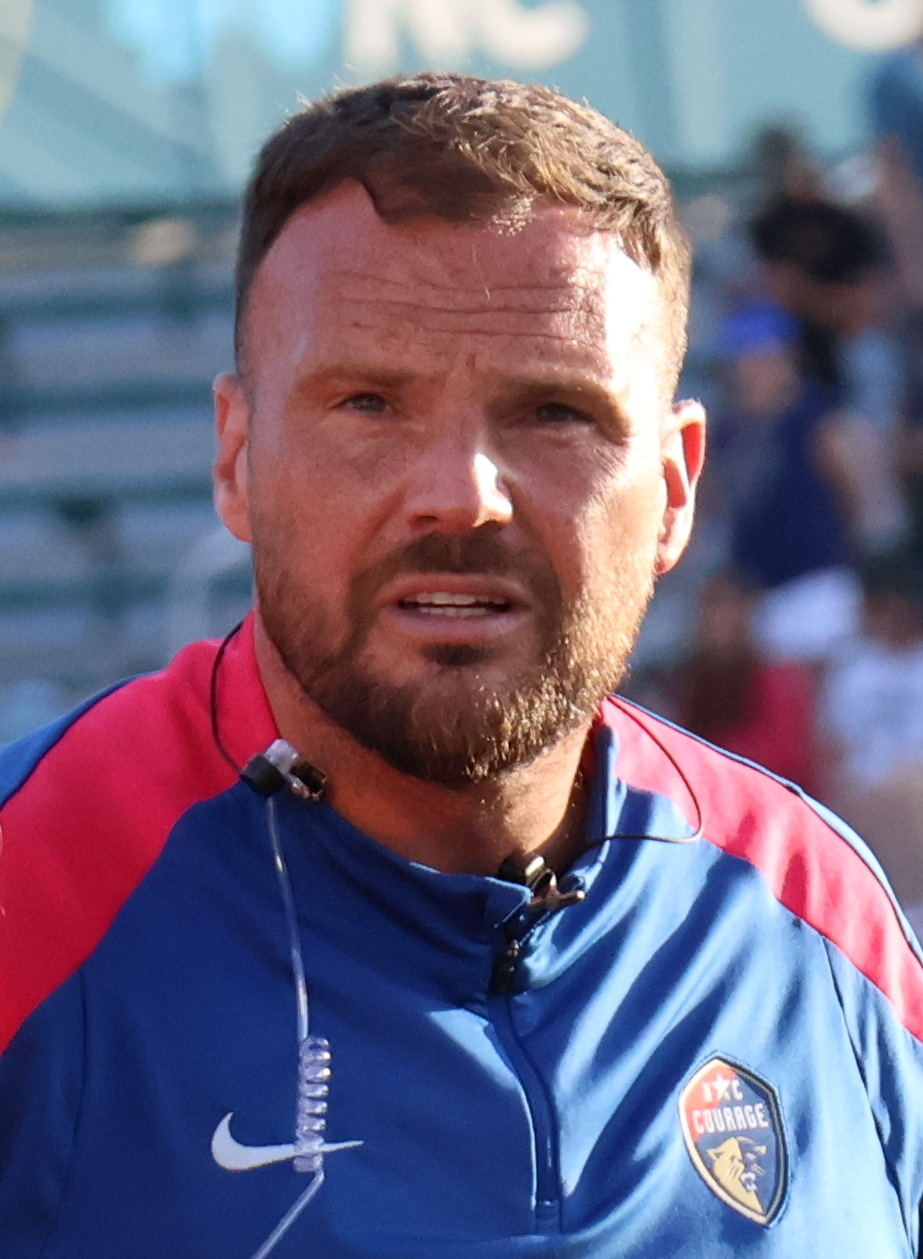
- Thackeray with the North Carolina Courage in 2025

Personal information
- Date of birth: February 14, 1988 (age 38)
- Place of birth: Burnley, England
- Position: Goalkeeper

College career
Years	Team	Apps	(Gls)
2006–2010	William Woods Owls		

Senior career*
Years	Team	Apps	(Gls)
2003–2006	Bradford City		
2011	Corby Town		

Managerial career
- 2011–2012: Young Harris Mountain Lions; Assistant/goalkeeping coach
- 2012–2016: Houston Dynamo Academy; Head of goalkeeping
- 2016–2020: North Carolina FC Youth; Director of goalkeeping
- 2017–2025: North Carolina Courage; Assistant/goalkeeping coach
- 2021–2023: North Carolina Tar Heels; Assistant coach
- 2025: North Carolina Courage; Interim head coach
- 2026: Dallas Trinity
- * Club domestic league appearances and goals

Nathan Thackeray (born February 14, 1988) is an English association football coach who was most recently the head coach of USL Super League club Dallas Trinity. He was previously an assistant coach and interim head coach for the North Carolina Courage of the National Women's Soccer League (NWSL).

== Playing career ==
Born in Burnley, England, Thackeray began his football career at Bradford City on a two-year apprentice scheme in his native country, England. However, he suffered an injury in late-2004. However, he left in 2006.

Soon after, Thackeray moved to the United States to attend William Woods University in Missouri, where he played for the William Woods Owls. He also played for the Kalamazoo Outrage and the St. Louis Lions during college. He graduated from William Woods in 2010, receiving a bachelor's degree in communications and media studies.

== Coaching career ==
After college, Thackeray moved into coaching as the men's and women's goalkeepers coach at Young Harris College in Georgia in 2011. The following year, he became the head of goalkeeping at the Houston Dynamo FC Academy, where he spent four seasons. He also coached the Houston Aces when he was there.

Thackeray became the director of goalkeeping for North Carolina FC Youth (then called CASL) in 2016. He soon added an assistant coach role with the North Carolina Courage when the team was established in 2017, joining the coaching staff under Paul Riley. In their first three seasons, the Courage won three NWSL Shields and two NWSL Championships. He assumed the assistant coach role full time in 2021. Following two consecutive NWSL Challenge Cup titles, he signed a contract extension in 2024. He was also an assistant coach for the North Carolina Tar Heels women's soccer team between 2021 and 2023.

Thackeray became acting head coach for the Courage in August 2025 after head coach Sean Nahas was fired midseason. He had previously filled the role in Nahas's absence on several occasions.

Thackeray left the Courage to become the head coach of USL Super League club Dallas Trinity in January 2026, replacing Chris Petrucelli who had been interim coach after Pauline MacDonald was fired the previous summer. After spending six months in Dallas, Thackeray departed from the Trinity on July 2, 2026, with Lee Nguyen hired in his place.

== Honors ==
North Carolina Courage (as assistant/goalkeeping coach)

- NWSL Championship: 2018, 2019
- NWSL Shield: 2017, 2018, 2019
- NWSL Challenge Cup: 2022, 2023
