= Dallas Trinity FC =

US professional women's soccer club

- Full name: Dallas Trinity FC
- Short name: DTFC
- Founded: May 16, 2023; 3 years ago
- Stadium: Cotton Bowl; Dallas, Texas
- Capacity: 92,100
- Owner: Atlético Dallas
- Sporting director: Brian Corcoran
- Coach: Lee Nguyen
- League: USL Super League
- 2025–26: USL Super League, 4th of 9; Playoffs: Semi-finals
- Website: www.dallastrinityfc.com
colors	colors

Dallas Trinity FC is an American professional women's soccer club based in Dallas, Texas, that competes in the USL Super League (USLS).

== History ==
=== Establishment ===
A team representing the Dallas–Fort Worth metroplex was announced in May 2023, along with the founding of the United Soccer League's USL Super League. Private funding for the team was paired with $592,000 from the city to have the team play at the Cotton Bowl, by far the highest-capacity stadium in the Super League. The deal was designed for a two-year term with an option for future seasons.

=== Inaugural season ===
Chris Petrucelli was named the initial general manager and the team confirmed to start play when the league began on August 17, 2024. Scotland's long tenured U-17 coach, Pauline MacDonald, was publicly named the club's first coach in June 2024. Amber Brooks became Dallas's first signing on May 31, 2024.

Adding to the excitement, Dallas Trinity brought in several players who are either from the DFW Metroplex or played college soccer in the Metroplex including: Hailey Davidson, Haley Berg, Allie Thornton, Gracie Brian, Cyera Hintzen, Enzi Broussard, Chioma Ubogagu, Madison White, Samantha Meza, Jenna Winebrenner and Sam Estrada.

Dallas played their inaugural match on August 18, 2024, against Tampa Bay Sun FC. With head coach MacDonald unavailable due to work visa complications, GM Petrucelli stepped in as interim head coach for the game. Dallas dominated much of the match, with Hannah Davison scoring Dallas's opening goal in first-half stoppage time, marking the first goal in club history. However, Tampa Bay equalized in the second half, and despite several attempts from Dallas, the game ended in a draw.

On June 30, 2026, it was announced that USL Championship expansion club Atlético Dallas had bought the Trinity. The two teams will begin to share the Cotton Bowl once Atlético begins play in the 2027 USL Championship season.

== Identity ==
The name and branding for the team was announced on May 9, 2024, with elements inspired by the Trinity River.

=== Colors ===
Dallas Trinity FC's colors were announced as: (1) sunrise maroon, (2) prairie gold, and (3) live oak green. Their website says: "The colors draw inspiration from the city skyline and the Trinity River, which reflects the vibrant nature of Dallas, as well as local pride and excellence."

=== Crest and Mascot ===
The club's crest features a Pegasus, and their mascot is a palomino horse named Boots, aligning with the tradition of Dallas-based sports teams such as the Dallas Mavericks, Dallas Wings, SMU Mustangs and Texas Rangers, all of which have horse-related mascots or crests. Boots's entrance theme is These Boots Are Made For Walkin' by Nancy Sinatra.

=== Sponsorship ===
Period	Kit manufacturer	Shirt sponsor (front)	Shirt sponsor (back)	Sleeve sponsor	Shorts sponsor	Ref.
2024–2025	Nike	—	Relay Human Cloud	El Rio Grande Latin Market	The Wine Group/Cupcake Vineyards	
2025–present	Nike	Scottish Rite for Children (Home) UT Southwestern (Away)	Trust & Will	El Rio Grande Latin Market	IF/THEN® Initiative	

== Stadium ==
Dallas Trinity play their home games at the Cotton Bowl, a municipally owned stadium located in the Fair Park neighborhood of Dallas, Texas.

== Players and staff ==
=== Current squad ===
As of October 21, 2026

Note: Flags indicate national team as defined under FIFA eligibility rules; some limited exceptions apply. Players may hold more than one non-FIFA nationality.

No.	Pos.	Nation	Player
1	GK	USA	Maddy Anderson
2	FW	USA	Onyeka Gamero (on loan from Bay FC)
4	DF	USA	Meila Brewer
5	DF	USA	Lauren Flynn
6	MF	USA	Felicia Knox
7	MF	USA	Heather Stainbrook (on loan from Washington Spirit)
8	MF	ARG	Sophie Braun
9	FW	USA	Kalea Eichenberger
11	FW	USA	Rajanah Reed
13	FW	USA	Cyera Hintzen
14	FW	ENG	Chioma Ubogagu
15	MF	USA	Giulianna Gianino
16	DF	USA	Sydney Cheesman
17	FW	USA	Jasmine Hamid

No.	Pos.	Nation	Player
19	MF	USA	Aria Nagai (on loan from Utah Royals)
21	FW	USA	Camryn Lancaster
22	MF	USA	Jamie Shepherd (on loan from Bay FC)
23	MF	USA	Juliet Moore
24	MF	CAN	Wayny Balata
25	DF	USA	Drew Coomans
28	MF	USA	Carissa Boeckmann
30	FW	USA	Seven Castain (on loan from Orlando Pride)
32	MF	PAN	Sofia Cedeño (on loan from Seattle Reign)
33	FW	USA	Ally Cook
35	GK	USA	Neeku Purcell (on loan from Seattle Reign)
88	FW	USA	Heather MacNab

==== Out on loan ====
Note: Flags indicate national team as defined under FIFA eligibility rules; some limited exceptions apply. Players may hold more than one non-FIFA nationality.

No.	Pos.	Nation	Player
10	MF	USA	Lexi Missimo (on loan to Les Marseillaises through June 31, 2027)

=== Academy players ===
Note: Flags indicate national team as defined under FIFA eligibility rules; some limited exceptions apply. Players may hold more than one non-FIFA nationality.

No.	Pos.	Nation	Player
26	FW	USA	Kaiya Brewer

=== Staff ===
As of July 2, 2026*

Front office
Position	Name
Owner	(United States) Atlético Dallas
President	(United States) Charlie Neil
Technical staff
Head Coach	(United States) Lee Nguyen
Assistant Coach	Rio Ramirez
Head of Soccer Operations	Becky Maines
Assistant / Goalkeeper Coach	Omar Zeenni
3rd Assistant/Analyst	Chad Otec
Head of Performance	Jonathan Corbett

== Records ==
=== Year-by-year ===
As of mathces played on May 28, 2026

Season	League	Regular season								Playoffs	Avg. attendance	Top Goalscorer	
Season	League	P	W	D	L	GF	GA	Pts	Pos	Playoffs	Avg. attendance	Name(s)	Goals
2024–25	USLS	28	12	7	9	42	30	43	3rd	Semi-finals	3,546	(United States) Allie Thornton	13
2025–26	USLS	28	11	7	10	36	40	40	4th	Semi-Finals	3,048	(United States) Sealey Strawn	5
Total		56	23	14	19	78	70	83	–	–	–	(United States) Allie Thornton	17

1. Top goalscorer(s) includes all goals scored in League, and USL Super Cup Playoffs, and other competitive matches.

=== Head coaching record ===
As of matches played on May 28, 2026

Only competitive matches are counted.*

All-time Dallas Trinity FC coaching records
Head coach	Nat.	From	To	P	W	D	L	GF	GA	Win%
Chris Petrucelli (interim)	United States	August 18, 2024	September 13, 2024	3	1	2	0	8	4	66.67
Pauline MacDonald	Scotland	September 14, 2024	June 25, 2025	26	11	5	10	34	26	51.92
Chris Petrucelli (interim)	United States	August 23, 2025	January 20, 2026	13	6	2	5	15	21	46.15
Nathan Thackeray	United States	January 20, 2026	July 2, 2026	15	5	5	5	21	19	33.33
Lee Nguyen	United States	July 2, 2026	present	0	0	0	0	0	0	00.00

=== Team records ===
As of May 25, 2026. Current players in bold. Statistics are updated once a year after the conclusion of the USL Super League season.

Most appearances
Player					Appearances		
#	Name	Nat.	Pos.	Trinity career	USLS	Playoffs	Total
1	Amber Wisner	(United States)	MF	2024–2026	56	2	58
2	**Cyera Hintzen**	(United States)	DF	2024–	53	2	55
2	**Allie Thornton**	(United States)	FW	2024–	53	2	55
4	**Chioma Ubogagu**	(England)	FW	2024–	52	1	53
5	**Hannah Davison**	(United States)	DF	2024–	45	2	47
6	**Sealey Strawn**	**(United States)**	FW	2024–	44	1	45
7	**Camryn Lancaster**	**(United States)**	MF	2024–	39	2	41
8	Gracie Brian	(United States)	MF	2024–2026	37	1	38
9	Tamara Bolt	(Brazil)	FW	2025	26	1	27
9	Julia Dorsey	(United States)	DF	2024–2025	26	1	27

Top goalscorers
Player					Goals scored		
#	Name	Nat.	Pos.	Trinity career	USLS	Playoffs	Total
1	**Allie Thornton**	**(United States)**	FW	2024–	17	0	17
2	**Sealey Strawn**	**(United States)**	FW	2024–	9	0	9
3	Amber Wisner	(United States)	MF	2024–2026	6	0	6
3	**Chioma Ubogagu**	**(England)**	MF	2024–	6	0	6
3	**Camryn Lancaster**	**(United States)**	MF	2024–	6	0	6
6	Gracie Brian	(United States)	MF	2024–2026	5	0	5
7	**Lexi Missimo**	**(United States)**	MF	2025–	4	0	4
8	**Hannah Davison**	**(United States)**	DF	2024–	2	1	3
8	**Bethany Bos**	**(United States)**	FW	2026–	3	0	3

== Honors ==
Minor

- Copa Tejas (Shield)
  - Champions: 2025

== See also ==
- List of top-division football clubs in CONCACAF countries
- List of professional sports teams in the United States and Canada
- Sting SC
- Copa Tejas
