= Gracie Brian =

American soccer player (born 2001)

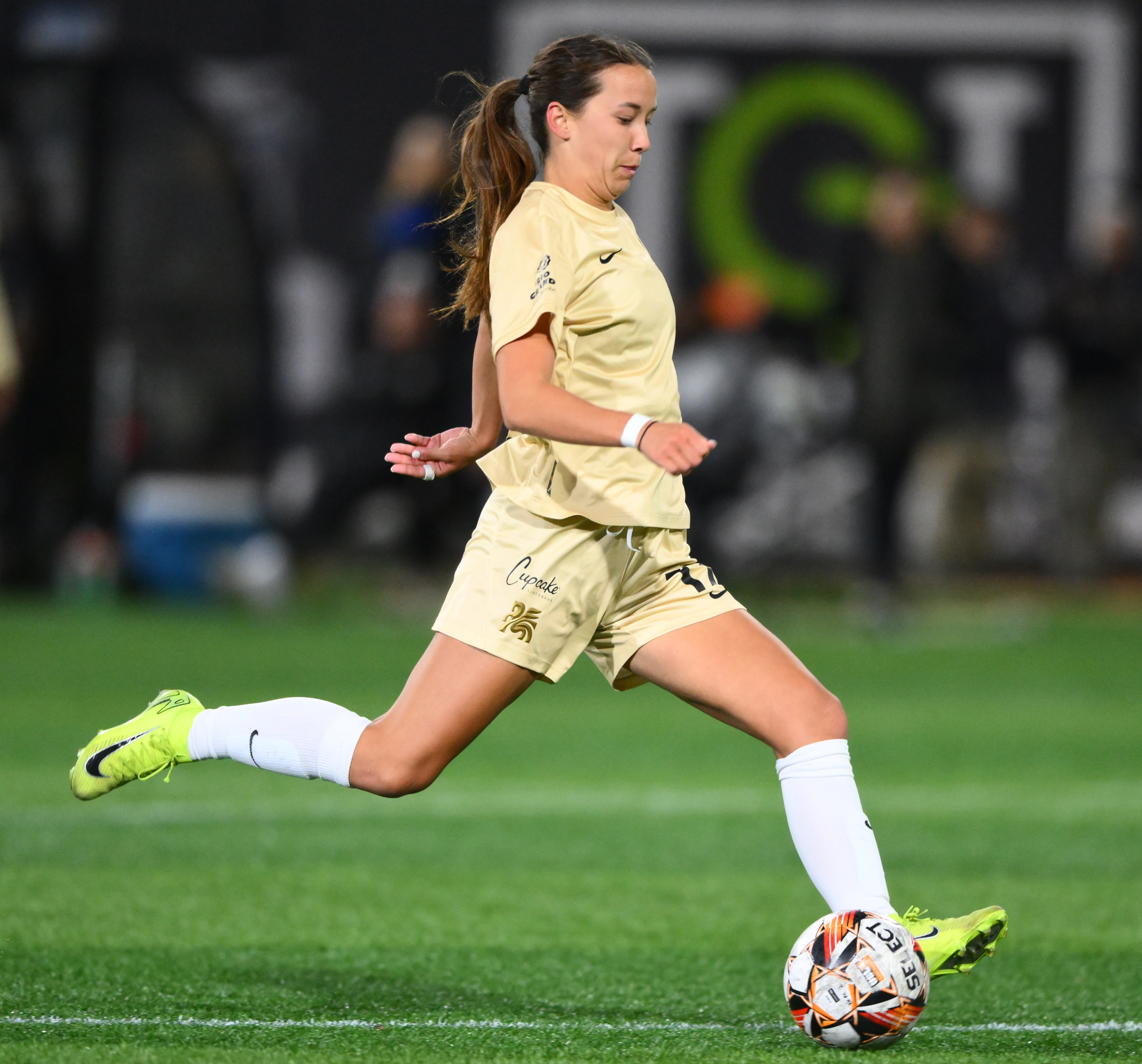
- Brian with Dallas Trinity in 2025

Personal information
- Full name: Gracie Maria Brian
- Date of birth: August 28, 2001 (age 25)
- Place of birth: Frisco, Texas, U.S.
- Height: 5 ft 6 in (1.68 m)
- Position: Midfielder

Youth career
- Sting FC

College career
Years	Team	Apps	(Gls)
2019–2023	TCU Horned Frogs	101	(35)

Senior career*
Years	Team	Apps	(Gls)
2024–2026	Dallas Trinity	37	(5)
2024	→ Houston Dash (loan)	0	(0)
- * Club domestic league appearances and goals as of 02:56, March 5, 2026 (UTC)

Gracie Maria Brian (born August 28, 2001) is an American former professional soccer player. She played college soccer for the TCU Horned Frogs, setting the program record for career assists. She played in the USL Super League with Dallas Trinity for one-and-a-half seasons.

== Early life ==
Brian went to and played for Wakeland High School in Frisco, Texas. She won a 5A State Championship with Wakeland in her junior year. Brian led the team in scoring all four years she played at Wakeland. She also holds two Wakeland High School records: Most Goals in a Career (99) and Most Goals in a Season (44).

== College career ==
Brian played her entire college career with the TCU Horned Frogs. In her freshman year, Brian started in every match for TCU. She scored her first goal against UAB on August 25, 2019, just three days after her TCU debut. During her junior year in 2021, Brian was part of the TCU team that won its first Big 12 Tournament title, as well as back to back Big 12 Conference championships. She scored a hat trick during the 2021 NCAA Women's Soccer Tournament against Prairie View A&M. TCU advanced to the Round of 16 but were eliminated by Rutgers in a penalty shootout. In her final season with the TCU, she led the team in goals (9) and points (21). Brian holds the program records for the all-time leader in assists (27), second in career points (97), and becoming the third player in TCU history to score 30 or more goals.

== Club career ==
Brian went undrafted in the 2024 NWSL Draft. Afterwards, she was called up to a six-week pre-season camp as a non-roster invitee by San Diego Wave FC. In June 2024, Brian represented the North Carolina Courage during The Soccer Tournament 2024 playing in five games and scoring three goals.

On June 21, 2024, Brian signed with Dallas Trinity, becoming the club's 7th signing overall. She made her professional debut on August 18, 2024, as a 75st-minute substitute during Dallas's inaugural match against Tampa Bay Sun FC in a 1–1 draw. On September 21, 2024, Brian and teammate Gabriela Guillén, were loaned to NWSL club Houston Dash on a short term loan agreement.

Brian scored her first professional goal on October 6, 2024, in a 2–1 Dallas victory against Spokane. On November 9, 2024, Brian scored the game-winning goal in Dallas's 3–2 comeback victory against Lexington SC. In March 2026, Brian announced her retirement from professional soccer. She made 37 league appearances and scored 5 goals across one-and-a-half seasons.

== Personal life ==
She graduated with a Bachelor of Arts in Entrepreneurship Studies from the Neeley School of Business at Texas Christian University (TCU).

== Career statistics ==
=== College ===
College	Regular Season				Big 12 Tournament		NCAA Tournament		Total	
College	Conference	Season	Apps	Goals	Apps	Goals	Apps	Goals	Apps	Goals
TCU Horned Frogs	Big 12	2019	18	9	3	0	1	0	22	9
TCU Horned Frogs	Big 12	2020–21	13	1	—		3	0	16	1
TCU Horned Frogs	Big 12	2021	18	6	3	0	3	3	24	9
TCU Horned Frogs	Big 12	2022	14	5	3	1	3	1	20	7
TCU Horned Frogs	Big 12	2023	18	8	1	1	—		19	9
Career total			81	29	10	2	10	3	101	35

=== Club ===
Club	Season	League			Playoffs		Total	
Club	Season	Division	Apps	Goals	Apps	Goals	Apps	Goals
Dallas Trinity	2024–25	USLS	26	5	1	0	26	5
Dallas Trinity	2025–26	USLS	11	2	–		11	2
Houston Dash (loan)	2024	NWSL	0	0	–		0	0
Career total			37	7	0	0	37	7

== Honors ==
TCU Horned Frogs

- Big 12 Conference: 2020, 2021
- Big 12 Conference tournament: 2021

Individual

- USL Super League Team of the Month, November 2024
- Third-team All-American: 2022
- First-team All-Big 12 Conference: 2021, 2022, 2023
- Big 12 All-Freshman Team: 2019
