= 2023 Ivy League women's soccer tournament =

- Classification: Division I
- Teams: 4
- Matches: 3
- Attendance: 1,759
- Site: Stevenson Field; Providence, Rhode Island
- Champions: Harvard (1st title)
- Winning coach: Chris Hamblin (1st title)
- MVP: Josefine Hasbo (Harvard)
- Broadcast: ESPN+

2023 Ivy League women's soccer standings
	Conf.						Overall
Team	W		L		T	PCT	W		L		T	PCT
Brown ‍†‍‍^{y}	7	–	0	–	0	1.000	12	–	3	–	2	.765
Harvard ‍‍‡‍^{y}	5	–	1	–	1	.786	13	–	4	–	2	.737
Princeton ‍‍‍^{y}	4	–	2	–	1	.643	10	–	5	–	4	.632
Columbia ‍‍‍^{y}	3	–	2	–	2	.571	11	–	5	–	3	.658
Dartmouth ‍‍‍	2	–	3	–	2	.429	7	–	3	–	5	.633
Penn ‍‍‍	1	–	4	–	2	.286	6	–	7	–	3	.469
Yale ‍‍‍	0	–	5	–	2	.143	5	–	6	–	5	.469
Cornell ‍‍‍	0	–	5	–	2	.143	4	–	5	–	6	.467
† – Conference champion ‡ – 2023 Ivy League Tournament champion y – Invited to the NCAA Tournament; As of December 5, 2023; Rankings from United Soccer Coaches Poll; Source: Ivy League

The 2023 Ivy League women's soccer tournament was the inaugural postseason women's soccer tournament for the Ivy League held from November 3 through November 5, 2023. The tournament was hosted by Stevenson Field in Providence, Rhode Island, home of the regular season champions, Brown. The four team-team single-elimination tournament consisted of two rounds based on seeding from regular season conference play. Second seeded Harvard became the first team to win the championship by defeating Columbia 3–0 in the Final. The conference tournament title was the first for the Harvard women's soccer program, and the first for head coach Chris Hamblin. Harvard had previously won thirteen regular season women's soccer titles before the Ivy League Tournament was created. As tournament champions, Harvard earned the Ivy League's automatic berth into the 2023 NCAA Division I women's soccer tournament.

== Seeding ==
The top four teams in the regular season earned a spot in the tournament and teams were seeded by conference record. No tiebreakers were required as each of the top five teams finished with unique conference records.

Seed	School	Conference Record	Points
1	Brown	7–0–0	21
2	Harvard	5–1–1	16
3	Princeton	4–2–1	13
4	Columbia	3–2–2	11

== Bracket ==
Semifinals; Friday, Nov. 3
1	Brown	1
4	Columbia (a.e.t.)	2
2	Harvard	4
3	Princeton	2

Final; Sunday, Nov. 5
4	Columbia	0
2	Harvard	3

== Schedule ==
=== Semifinals ===
November 3	#2 Harvard	4–2	#3 Princeton	Providence, RI
2:00 p.m. ET	Hannah Bebar 22'; Josefine Hasbo 30'; Ólöf Kristinsdóttir 48'; Gabby DelPico 53'; Taylor Fasnacht (yellow card) 65'	Report	17' (pen.) Heather MacNab; 28' Lexi Hiltunen; (yellow card) 80' Aria Nagai; (yellow card) 84' Pia Beaulieu	Stadium: Stevenson Field; Attendance: 680; Referee: Leah Hayes; Assistant referees: Miguel Lara; Sandro Araujo; Fourth official: Steven Mauricio

November 3	#1 Brown	1–2 (a.e.t.)	#4 Columbia	Providence, RI
5:00 p.m. ET	Brittany Raphino 40'; Naya Cardoza (yellow card) 45'	Report	(yellow card) 45' Team; 54' Kat Jordan; (yellow card) 62' Grace Hurren; (yellow card) 99', (goal) 100' Shira Cohen	Stadium: Stevenson Field; Attendance: 767; Referee: David Breckner; Assistant referees: John Juk; John Jordan; Fourth official: Kevin Suares

=== Final ===
November 5	#2 Harvard	3–0	#4 Columbia	Providence, RI
1:00 p.m. ET	Josefine Hasbo 53', 62', 71'; Hannah Bebar (yellow card) 65'	Report	(yellow card) 56' Team; (yellow card) 90' Nata Ramirez	Stadium: Stevenson Field; Attendance: 312; Referee: Katie McCormack; Assistant referees: Katherine Mitchell; Matt Stein; Fourth official: Omar Roa

Team details

Harvard
Columbia

GK	1	(Canada) Anna Karpenko
DF	4	(United States) Smith Hunter
DF	5	(Canada) Jade Rose
DF	6	(United States) August Hunter
DF	17	(United States) Taylor Fasnacht
MF	7	(Denmark) Josefine Hasbo
MF	14	(Iceland) Írena Héðinsdóttir
MF	21	(United States) Gabby DelPico
MF	41	(United States) Hannah Bebar
FW	9	(Iceland) Ólöf Kristinsdóttir
FW	11	(United States) Ava Lung
Manager:
(United States) Chris Hamblin

GK	1	(United States) Paige Nurkin
DF	5	(United States) Marcia Ojo
DF	6	(United States) Ania Prussak
DF	11	(United States) Courtney Ruedt
DF	17	(United States) Justina Bitzer
DF	66	(United States) Sam Gordon
MF	3	(United States) Grace Hurren
MF	10	(United States) Kat Jordan
MF	16	(United States) Maia Tabion
FW	26	(United States) Nata Ramirez
FW	30	(United States) Kendall McBride
Manager:
(United States) Tracey Bartholomew

== Statistics ==
=== Goalscorers ===
There were 12 goals scored in 3 matches, for an average of 4 goals per match (as of November 5, 2023).

4 goals

- Josefine Hasbo – Harvard

1 goal

- Brittany Raphino – Brown
- Shira Cohen – Columbia
- Kat Jordan – Columbia
- Hannah Bebar – Harvard
- Gabby DelPico – Harvard
- Ólöf Kristinsdóttir – Harvard
- Lexi Hiltunen – Princeton
- Heather MacNab – Princeton

== All-Tournament team ==
Player	Team
Hannah Bebar	Harvard
Gabby DelPico	Harvard
**Josefine Hasbo**	Harvard
Anna Karpenko	Harvard
Kat Jordan	Columbia
Courtney Ruedt	Columbia
Marcia Ojo	Columbia
Sheyenne Allen	Brown
Brittany Raphino	Brown
Lexi Hiltunen	Princeton
Aria Nagai	Princeton

MVP in bold
