= Ivy League women's soccer tournament =

Intercollegiate soccer competition

- Conference soccer championship
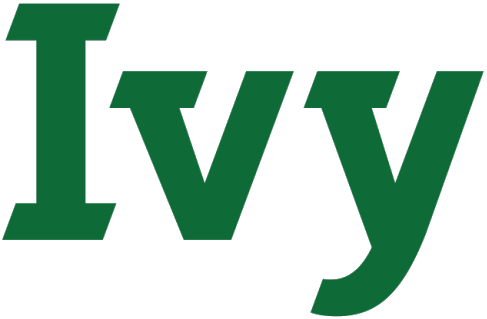
- Sport: College soccer
- Conference: Ivy League
- Number of teams: 4
- Format: Single-elimination tournament
- Current stadium: Stevenson Field
- Current location: Providence, Rhode Island
- Played: 1978–1981, 2023–present
- Last contest: 2026
- Current champion: Brown (2nd title)
- Most championships: Harvard (4 titles)
- TV partner: ESPN+
- Official website: ivyleauge.com/wsoc

The Ivy League women's soccer tournament is the conference championship tournament in soccer for the Ivy League. The tournament was held from 1978 to 1981 before being discontinued. The competition was revived in 2023.

The tournament has been held every year since 1994. It is a single-elimination tournament and seeding is based on regular season records. The winner, declared conference champion, receives the conference's automatic bid to the NCAA Division I women's soccer championship.

== Champions ==
=== Tournament ===
The tournament is contested by the four best placed teams in the regular season. They play a semifinal on a single-leg basis with the following criteria: 1st. v 4th. and 2nd. v 3rd. Winners advance to the final where the tournament winner is decided.

Keys
- (1) Title number
- a.e.t. – Match went to extra time
- p.s.o. – Match decided by a penalty shootout after extra time
- – Winning team also won regular season

Ed.	Year	Champion	Score	Runner-up	Venue	City	MVP	Ref.
1	1978	Harvard (1)	3–0	Brown	Stevenson Field	Providence, RI		
2	1979	Harvard (2)	5–1	Brown	Ohiri Field	Cambridge, MA		
3	1980	Brown (1)	2–0 (a.e.t.)	Princeton	Reese Stadium	New Haven, CT		
4	1981	Harvard (3)	4–3 (a.e.t.)	Brown	Roberts Stadium	Princeton, NJ		
5	2023	Harvard (4)	3–0	Columbia	Stevenson Field	Providence, RI	Josefine Hasbo (Harvard)	
6	2024	Princeton (1)	2–0	Brown	Roberts Stadium	Princeton, NJ	Drew Coomans (Princeton)	
7	2025	Dartmouth (1)	1–0	Princeton	Roberts Stadium	Princeton, NJ	Stephanie Lathrop (Dartmouth)	
8	2026	Brown (2)	1–0	Columbia	Burnham Field	Hanover, NH	Joy Okonye (Brown)	

=== By school ===
As of November 2026

School	Apps.	Wins	L	T	PCT	Finals	Titles	Winning Years
Brown	8	9	6	0	.600	6	2	1980, 2026
Columbia	4	2	4	0	.333	2	0	—
Cornell	2	0	3	0	.000	0	0	—
Dartmouth	6	3	5	0	.375	1	1	2025
Harvard	6	10	2	0	.833	4	4	1978, 1979, 1981, 2023
Penn	3	1	4	0	.200	0	0	—
Princeton	7	7	8	0	.467	3	1	2024
Yale	4	5	5	0	.500	0	0	—

== Regular season ==
=== Champions ===
Ed.	Year	Champion/s
1	1978	Harvard (1)
2	1979	Harvard (2)
3	1980	Brown (1)
4	1981	Harvard (3)
5	1982	Princeton (1) (Note: Title shared.)
5	1982	Brown (2)
6	1983	Brown (3)
7	1984	Brown (4)
8	1985	Brown (5)
9	1986	Brown (6)
10	1987	Brown (7)
10	1987	Cornell (1)
11	1988	Brown (8)
12	1989	Brown (9)
13	1990	Brown (10)
14	1991	Cornell (2)
14	1991	Dartmouth (1)
15	1992	Brown (11)
15	1992	Yale (1)

Ed.	Year	Champion/s
16	1993	Dartmouth (2)
17	1994	Brown (12)
18	1995	Harvard (4)
19	1996	Harvard (5)
20	1997	Harvard (6)
21	1998	Dartmouth (3)
22	1999	Harvard (7)
23	2000	Dartmouth (4)
23	2000	Princeton (2)
24	2001	Dartmouth (5)
24	2001	Penn (1)
24	2001	Princeton (3)
25	2002	Princeton (4)
26	2003	Dartmouth (6)
27	2004	Princeton (6)
28	2005	Yale (2)
29	2006	Columbia (1)
30	2007	Penn (2)

Ed.	Year	Champion/s
31	2008	Harvard (8)
31	2008	Princeton (7)
32	2009	Harvard (9)
33	2010	Penn (3)
34	2011	Harvard (10)
35	2012	Princeton (8)
36	2013	Harvard (11)
37	2014	Harvard (12)
38	2015	Princeton (9)
39	2016	Harvard (13)
40	2017	Princeton (10)
41	2018	Penn (4)
41	2018	Princeton (11)
42	2019	Brown (13)
–	2020	(not held) (Note: Activity suspended due to the COVID-19 pandemic.)
43	2021	Brown (14)
44	2022	Brown (15)
45	2023	Brown (16)

Ed.	Year	Champion/s
46	2024	Princeton (11)
47	2025	Princeton (12)
48	2026	Dartmouth (7)

=== Titles by school ===
School	Titles	Winning years
Brown	16	1980, 1982, 1983, 1984, 1985, 1986, 1987, 1988, 1989, 1990, 1992, 1994, 2019, 2021, 2022, 2023
Harvard	13	1978, 1979, 1981, 1995, 1996, 1997, 1999, 2008, 2009, 2011, 2013, 2014, 2016
Princeton	12	1982, 2000, 2001, 2002, 2004, 2008, 2012, 2015, 2017, 2018, 2024, 2025
Dartmouth	7	1991, 1993, 1998, 2000, 2001, 2003, 2026
Penn	4	2001, 2007, 2010, 2018
Cornell	2	1987, 1991
Yale	2	1992, 2005
Columbia	1	2006
