= Drew Coomans =

American soccer player (born 2003)

Personal information
- Date of birth: October 6, 2003 (age 23)
- Height: 5 ft 4 in (1.63 m)
- Positions: Left back; right back

Team information
- Current team: Dallas Trinity
- Number: 25

Youth career
- Beach FC

College career
Years	Team	Apps	(Gls)
2022–2025	Princeton Tigers	70	(6)

Senior career*
Years	Team	Apps	(Gls)
2026–	Dallas Trinity	1	(0)
- * Club domestic league appearances and goals as of August 15, 2026

Drew Coomans (born October 6, 2003) is an American professional soccer player who plays as a left back or right back for USL Super League club Dallas Trinity. She played college soccer for the Princeton Tigers.

== Early life ==
Coomans grew up in Long Beach, California. She attended Chadwick School, earning all-league recognition as team captain, and played ECNL club soccer for Beach FC. She committed to play college soccer for the Princeton Tigers before her senior year. Then a forward, she was ranked by TopDrawerSoccer as the 44th-best prospect in her class.

== College career ==
Coomans made 17 appearances for the Princeton Tigers as a freshman in 2022. Initially a right winger, she was also deployed as an attacking midfielder or left winger over her first three seasons. She recorded 2 goals and 5 assists in 18 games as a sophomore in 2023, earning second-team All-Ivy League honors for the first of two seasons. In her junior year in 2024, she scored 3 goals and had 5 assists in 18 appearances as she helped the Tigers win the Ivy League regular-season and tournament titles, scoring in the conference final. The following summer, she trained with former teammate Pietra Tordin and the National Women's Soccer League (NWSL)'s Portland Thorns for two weeks. During her senior year in 2025, she was converted to left back as a result of injuries in the squad and flourished in the new defensive role. She started all 17 games for the repeat regular-season champions and was named first-team All-Ivy and the Ivy League Defensive Player of the Year.

== Club career ==
Coomans attended the inaugural NWSL Combine in December 2025. In April 2026, she trained with the NWSL's Bay FC, starting in their 1–0 friendly win over the Ottawa Rapid.

In July 2026, Coomans signed her first professional contract with USL Super League club Dallas Trinity, reuniting with former Princeton teammates Aria Nagai and Heather MacNab. She made her professional debut on August 15, starting and playing the full 90 minutes in a season-opening 1–1 draw with the Tampa Bay Sun.

== International career ==
Coomans attended training camps with the United States under-17 team in the lead-up to the 2020 CONCACAF Women's U-17 Championship, which was cancelled.

== Honors and awards ==
Princeton Tigers

- Ivy League: 2024, 2025
- Ivy League tournament: 2024

Individual

- Ivy League Defensive Player of the Year: 2025
- Most Valuable Player of the Ivy League Tournament: 2024
- First-team All-Ivy: 2025
- Second-team All-Ivy: 2023, 2024
- Honorable Mention All-Ivy 2022
