= Tyler McCamey =

American soccer player (born 2001)

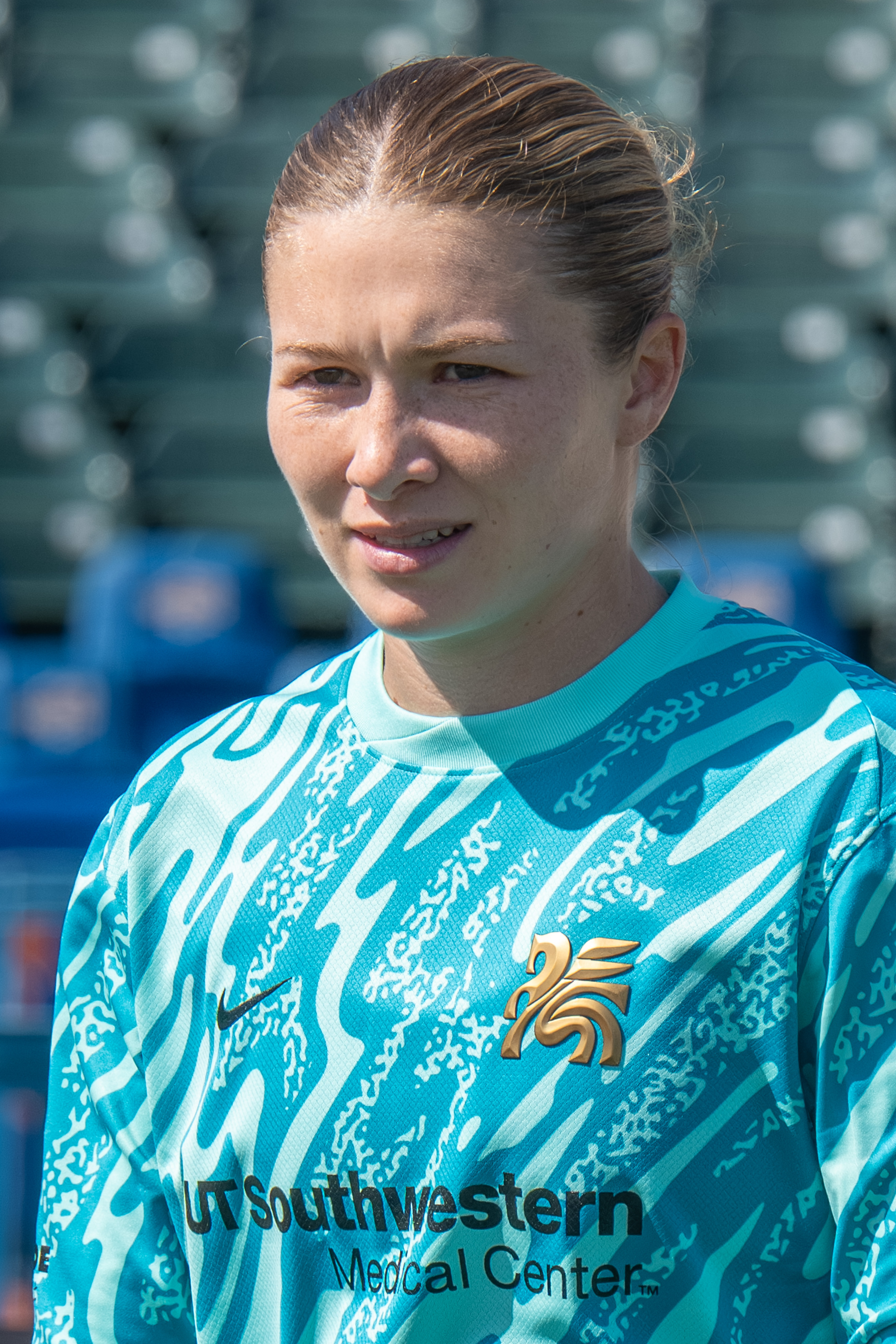
- McCamey with the Dallas Trinity in 2026

Personal information
- Full name: Tyler Brock McCamey
- Date of birth: August 19, 2001 (age 25)
- Height: 5 ft 9 in (1.75 m)
- Position: Goalkeeper

Team information
- Current team: Barcelona
- Number: 25

Youth career
- Tophat SC

College career
Years	Team	Apps	(Gls)
2021–2024	Princeton Tigers	56	(0)

Senior career*
Years	Team	Apps	(Gls)
2025	Gotham FC	0	(0)
2025	Kansas City Current	0	(0)
2026	Dallas Trinity	15	(0)
2026–	Barcelona	0	(0)
- * Club domestic league appearances and goals as of May 23, 2026

Tyler Brock McCamey (born August 19, 2001) is an American professional soccer player who plays as a goalkeeper for Liga F club Barcelona. She played college soccer for the Princeton Tigers. After stints with Gotham FC and the Kansas City Current, she made her professional debut for USL Super League club Dallas Trinity FC in 2026.

== Early life ==
Growing up in Atlanta, McCamey played club soccer for Tophat, serving as team captain, in both the DA and the ECNL. She committed to play college soccer at Princeton University during her junior year at the Westminster Schools.

== College career ==
After the 2020 season was cancelled due to the COVID-19 pandemic, McCamey was mostly a backup in her freshman season in 2021, making three starts for the Princeton Tigers. She shared goalkeeping duties as a sophomore, playing 70% of the minutes, with 2 solo shutouts (8 total) in 15 games. She started all 19 games in her junior year in 2023, keeping 6 clean sheets (7 total) including in both games at the NCAA tournament, losing in the second round on penalties. She co-captained Princeton with Heather MacNab in her senior year in 2024, leading the team to the Ivy League regular-season and tournament titles. She posted 8 solo clean sheets in 17 games, with 0.65 goals against average, was named first-team All-Ivy.

== Club career ==
=== Gotham FC and Kansas City Current ===
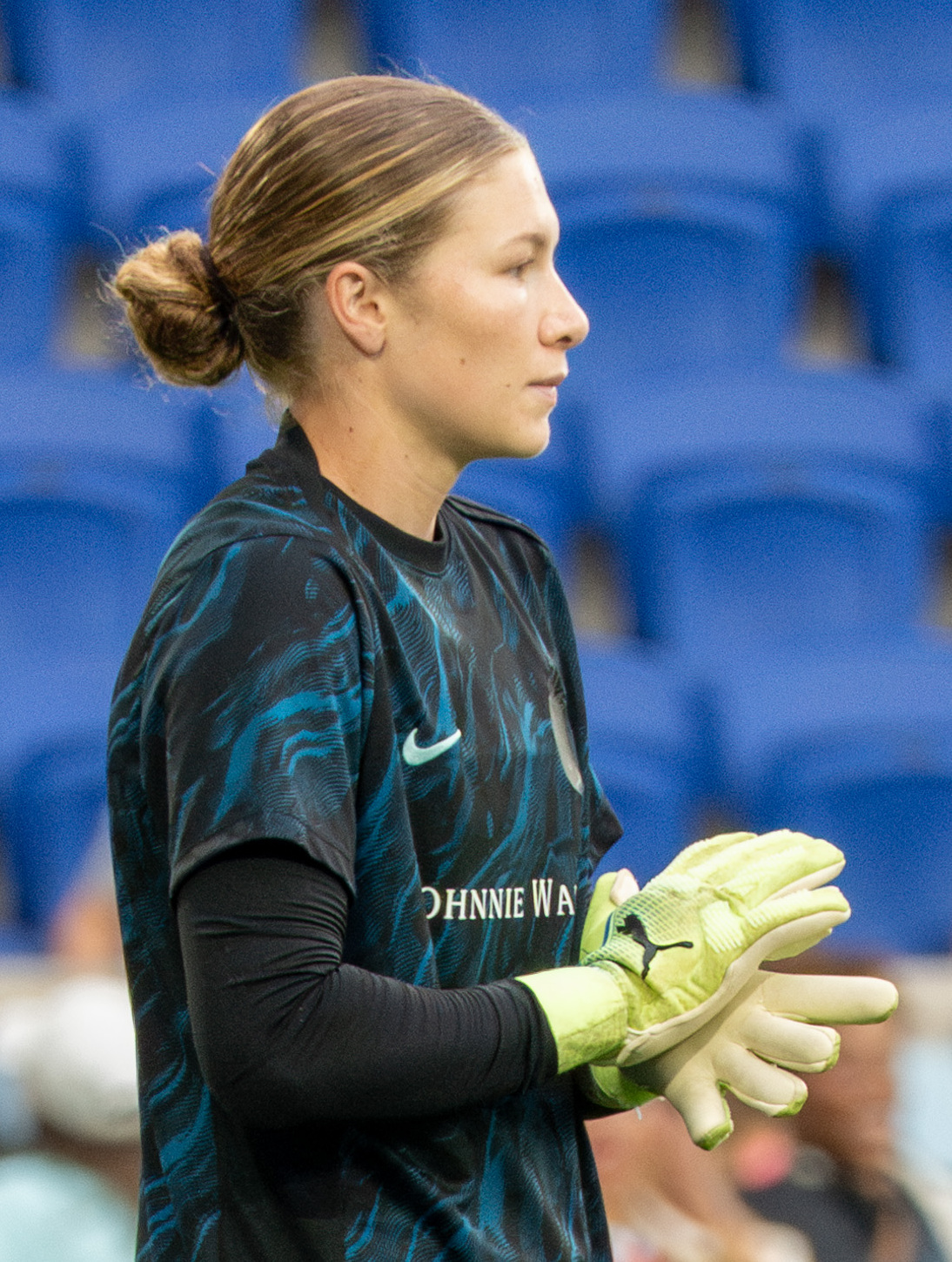
McCamey with Gotham FC in 2025

While completing her undergraduate studies in the spring of 2025, McCamey began her professional career unexpectedly early when the National Women's Soccer League (NWSL)'s Gotham FC reached out in April: Ann-Katrin Berger needed a backup after injuries to Shelby Hogan and Ryan Campbell. On April 17, Gotham FC signed McCamey and recently retired Michelle Betos, the club's assistant goalkeeping coach, to short-term injury replacement contracts. McCamey was on the bench for two league games and two games at the CONCACAF W Champions Cup (which Gotham won) before departing the club in June. In July, she trained with the North Carolina Courage for three weeks.

On September 5, 2025, the Kansas City Current announced that they had signed McCamey for the remainder of the season after an injury to third-string rookie Clare Gagne. She made no competitive appearances as the Current won the NWSL Shield, but she impressed at the World Sevens Football invitational tournament in December, saving two penalty kicks at the seven-a-side competition.

=== Dallas Trinity ===
On January 20, 2026, the Dallas Trinity announced that McCamey had signed with the club for the spring portion of the USL Super League season, reuniting with former North Carolina Courage coach Nathan Thackeray. She won the starting job over Samantha Estrada and made her professional debut later that month in a 1–1 draw with Brooklyn FC. The following game, she kept almost 80 scoreless minutes in a 4–0 win over Fort Lauderdale United, but was injured toward the end of the game. On March 8, she kept her first clean sheet in her fourth appearance, earning a 1–0 win over eventual Players' Shield champions Lexington SC. On May 16, she helped Dallas to a playoff-clinching 4–0 win over Fort Lauderdale United on the final day of the season. Despite joining in the winter break, she ranked fifth in the league in total saves while posting three shutouts. In the playoffs, the Trinity lost 2–0 to Lexington SC in the semifinals.

=== Barcelona ===
On July 25, 2026, it was announced that McCamey had signed a two-year deal with Spanish powerhouse Barcelona, joining a goalkeeping pool that included Cata Coll and Gemma Font.

== Honors and awards ==
Princeton Tigers

- Ivy League: 2024
- Ivy League tournament: 2024

Gotham FC

- CONCACAF W Champions Cup: 2024–25

Kansas City Current

- NWSL Shield: 2025

Individual

- First-team All-Ivy League: 2024
