= 2024 Ivy League women's soccer tournament =

- Classification: Division I
- Teams: 4
- Matches: 3
- Attendance: 2,283
- Site: Roberts Stadium; Princeton, New Jersey
- Champions: Princeton (1st title)
- Winning coach: Sean Driscoll (1st title)
- MVP: Drew Coomans (Princeton)
- Broadcast: ESPN+

2024 Ivy League women's soccer standings
	Conf.						Overall
Team	W		L		T	PCT	W		L		T	PCT
Princeton ‍†‍‡‍^{y}	6	–	1	–	0	.857	14	–	5	–	0	.737
Columbia ‍‍‍	5	–	1	–	1	.786	7	–	5	–	4	.563
Brown ‍‍‍	3	–	2	–	2	.571	7	–	4	–	6	.588
Harvard ‍‍‍	3	–	3	–	1	.500	7	–	4	–	5	.594
Yale ‍‍‍	2	–	4	–	1	.357	8	–	7	–	1	.531
Penn ‍‍‍	1	–	3	–	3	.357	2	–	8	–	6	.313
Cornell ‍‍‍	2	–	5	–	0	.286	3	–	9	–	4	.313
Dartmouth ‍‍‍	1	–	4	–	2	.286	7	–	6	–	3	.531
† – Conference champion ‡ – 2024 Ivy League Tournament champion y – Invited to the NCAA Tournament; As of December 10, 2024; Rankings from United Soccer Coaches Poll; Source:Ivy League

The 2024 Ivy League women's soccer tournament was the second postseason women's soccer tournament for the Ivy League, held on November 8 and 10, 2024. The tournament was hosted at Roberts Stadium in Princeton, New Jersey, home of the regular season champions, Princeton. The four team-team single-elimination tournament consisted of two rounds based on seeding from regular season conference play. Hosts Princeton won the tournament, defeating Brown 2–0 in the final. Princeton became the first team to win both the regular season and tournament titles. As tournament champions, Princeton earned the Ivy League's automatic berth into the 2024 NCAA Division I women's soccer tournament.

== Seeding ==
The top four teams in the regular season earned a spot in the tournament and teams were seeded by conference record. No tiebreakers were required as each of the top five teams finished with unique conference records.

Seed	School	Conference Record	Points
1	Princeton	6–1–0	18
2	Columbia	5–1–1	16
3	Brown	3–2–2	11
4	Harvard	3–3–1	10

== Bracket ==
Semifinals; Friday, Nov. 8
1	Princeton	3
4	Harvard	1
2	Columbia	1
3	Brown	2

Final; Sunday, Nov. 10
1	Princeton	2
3	Brown	0

== Schedule ==
=== Semifinals ===
November 8	#2 Columbia	1–2	#3 Brown	Princeton, NJ
1:00 p.m. ET	Nata Ramirez 23'; Nata Ramirez (yellow card) 57'		44' Gianna De Priest; 46' (pen.) Lexi Quinn; (yellow card) 78' Nadja Meite	Stadium: Roberts Stadium; Attendance: 365

November 8	#1 Princeton	3–1	#4 Harvard	Princeton, NJ
4:30 p.m. ET	Pietra Tordin 22' (pen.), 50'; Pietra Tordin (yellow card) 55'; Kayla Wong 68'		54' Áslaug Munda Gunnlaugsdóttir	Stadium: Roberts Stadium; Attendance: 768; Referee: Mike DeFelice; Assistant referees: Kenny Freeman; Jay Hutchinson; Fourth official: Maria Gigante

=== Final ===
November 10	#1 Princeton	2–0	#3 Brown	Princeton, NJ
1:00 p.m. ET	Drew Coomans 34'; Lily Bryant 47'; Lily Bryant (yellow card) 52'			Stadium: Roberts Stadium; Attendance: 1150; Referee: Marie Durr; Assistant referees: Sami Card; Inga Maric; Fourth official: Magda Zwierzchowski

== Statistics ==
=== Goalscorers ===
There were 9 goals scored in 3 matches, for an average of 3 goals per match.

2 goals

- Pietra Tordin – Princeton

1 goal

- Gianna De Priest – Brown
- Lexi Quinn – Brown
- Nata Ramirez – Columbia
- Áslaug Munda Gunnlaugsdóttir – Harvard
- Drew Coomans – Princeton
- Kayla Wong – Princeton
- Lily Bryant – Princeton

== All-Tournament team ==
Player	Team
Bella Schoop	Brown
Gianna De Priest	Brown
Lexi Quinn	Brown
Nata Ramirez	Columbia
Sophia Cavaliere	Columbia
Áslaug Munda Gunnlaugsdóttir	Harvard
Írena Héoinsdóttir Gonzalez	Harvard
**Drew Coomans**	Princeton
Heather MacNab	Princeton
Tyler McCamey	Princeton
Pietra Tordin	Princeton

MVP in bold
