= Pietra Tordin =

American soccer player (born 2004)

- Tordin with the Portland Thorns in 2026

Personal information
- Full name: Pietra Adao Tordin
- Date of birth: March 30, 2004 (age 22)
- Place of birth: Doral, Florida, U.S.
- Height: 5 ft 6 in (1.68 m)
- Positions: Forward; midfielder

Team information
- Current team: Portland Thorns
- Number: 19

Youth career
- Sunrise Prime FC

College career
Years	Team	Apps	(Gls)
2022–2024	Princeton Tigers	45	(30)

Senior career*
Years	Team	Apps	(Gls)
2025–	Portland Thorns	54	(12)

International career^{‡}
2023	Brazil U20		
2024	United States U20	11	(6)
2025–	United States U23	3	(0)
2026–	United States	1	(0)
Medal record
Women's soccer
Representing United States
FIFA U-20 Women's World Cup
Bronze medal – third place	Colombia 2024
- * Club domestic league appearances and goals as of November 11, 2026 ‡ National team caps and goals as of October 13, 2026

Pietra Adao Tordin (born March 30, 2004) is an American professional soccer player who plays as a forward for Portland Thorns FC of the National Women's Soccer League (NWSL) and the United States national team. A college soccer All-American for the Princeton Tigers, she signed with the Thorns in 2025.

Born in the United States to Brazilian parents, Tordin was briefly a youth international for Brazil before switching to the United States. She won bronze with the United States at the 2024 FIFA U-20 Women's World Cup and debuted for the senior team in 2026.

== Early life ==
Tordin was born and raised in the Miami suburb of Doral, Florida. She played soccer on boys' teams growing up because there was no nearby team for girls. When she was 14, she joined a girls' team that was a 40-minute drive away. While attending Doral Academy, she quit soccer for a year before returning to play for her high school team and the ECNL club Sunrise Prime FC.

== College career ==
Tordin became a starter for the Princeton Tigers during her freshman season in 2022. She led the team in scoring with 8 goals in 17 games, Princeton's first freshman top scorer since Tyler Lussi in 2013, and was named the Ivy League rookie of the year and second-team All-Ivy. In the summer of 2023, prior to her sophomore campaign at Princeton, Tordin trained with Brazilian professional club Palmeiras.

Tordin scored 12 goals in 18 games in her sophomore year in 2023, second-most in the Ivy League, and was named to the All-Ivy first team and United Soccer Coaches All-American third team alongside senior teammate Madison Curry. She helped Princeton qualify for the NCAA tournament, where they lost in the second round to Texas Tech on penalties. She trained with the NWSL's Orlando Pride the following summer.

In her junior season in 2024, Tordin scored an Ivy League-best 10 goals in 10 games, missing a portion of the season while at the 2024 FIFA U-20 Women's World Cup. She scored the only goal of a 1–0 win against Brown that clinched the league regular-season title for Princeton. She scored twice in a 3–1 win against Harvard as Princeton won the Ivy League tournament, with Tordin the top scorer of the tournament. Her final goal came in her final college game, a 2–1 loss to Virginia in the first round of the NCAA tournament. She was named the Ivy League Offensive Player of the Year and first-team All-Ivy. After her junior year, she gave up her remaining year of college eligibility to sign professionally.

== Club career ==
Portland Thorns FC announced on January 8, 2025, that the club had signed Tordin to her first professional contract on a two-year deal with the player option for an additional year. She made her professional debut on March 15, the first day of the season, as a late substitute for Deyna Castellanos in a 3–1 loss to the Kansas City Current. On May 16, she was handed her first start by head coach Rob Gale and scored her first professional goal, opening a 4–1 win on the road against the Houston Dash. A week later, she made it two goals in two starts when she scored in a 3–0 win over Club América for third place at the CONCACAF W Champions Cup, the Thorns having lost to Tigres in the semifinals.

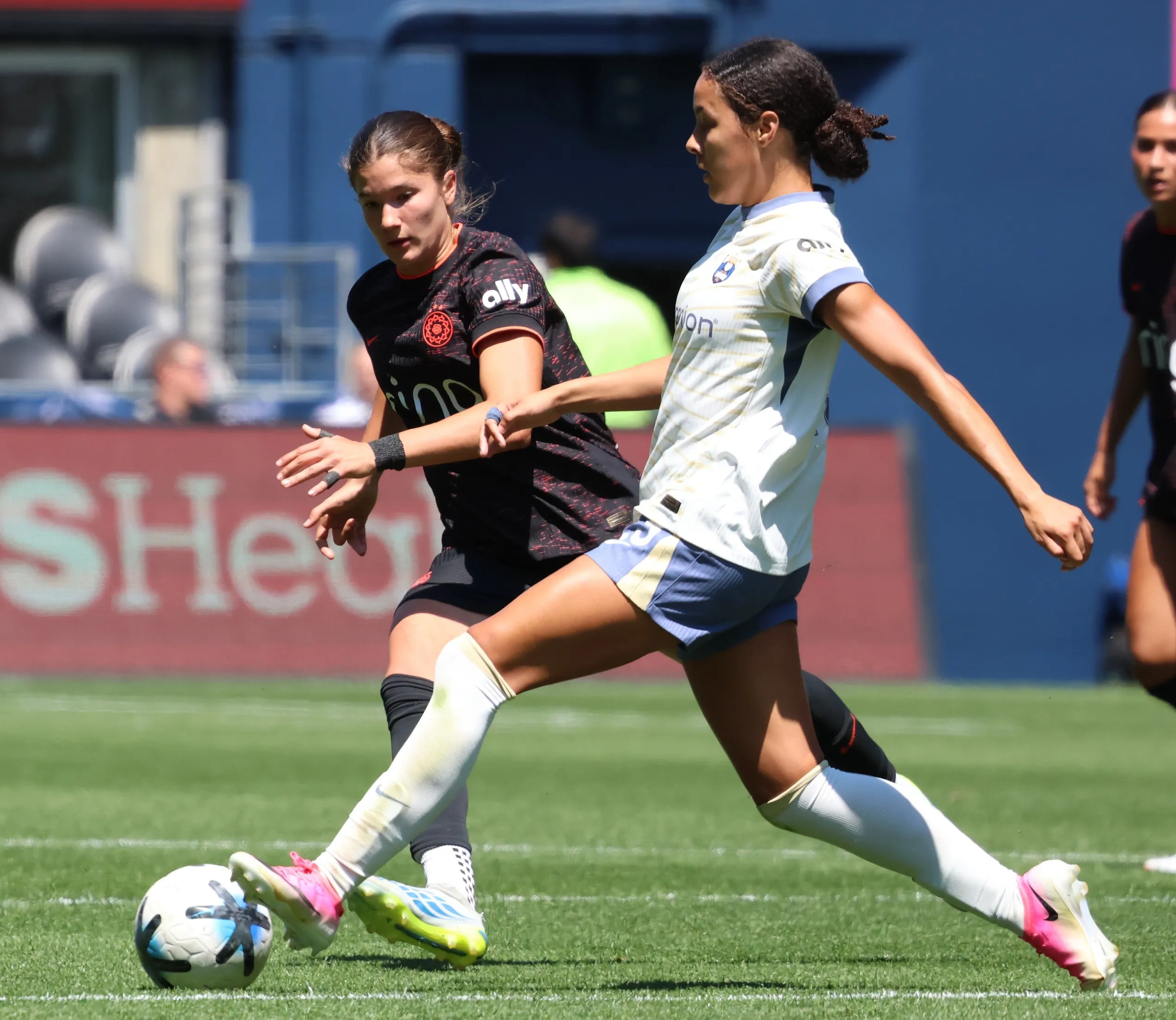
Tordin playing in the Cascadia derby in 2026

On June 15, 2025, Tordin scored her first goal at Providence Park to secure a 2–0 win over the Washington Spirit. She scored the only goal against the Chicago Stars the following week and was crowned NWSL Rookie of the Month at the end of June. On August 10, she scored her first Cascadia rivalry goal to conclude a 4–2 home win over the Seattle Reign, picking up a second Rookie of the Month selection at the end of August. Tordin finished her rookie season with 5 goals in 28 appearances in all competitions. She ranked second in the NWSL for goals per 90 minutes played. In the playoffs, the Thorns won 1–0 against the San Diego Wave in the quarterfinals, then lost 2–0 to the Washington Spirit in the semifinals.

On March 13, 2026, Tordin started the season with an assist to Olivia Moultrie in a 1–0 win over the Washington Spirit. The following week, she registered a goal and an assist in the Cascadia derby as the Thorns won 2–0 despite going down to nine players. On July 17, it was announced that she had signed a three-year contract extension with the Thorns through 2029. On August 9, she scored her first professional hat trick in a 4–3 victory over expansion team Boston Legacy, becoming the youngest Thorn to score a hat trick.

== International career ==
Tordin has United States and Brazilian citizenship. She received her first international call-up with the Brazil under-20 team in October 2023. Two months later, she appeared in a youth international friendly for Brazil, scoring the equalizer in a 1–1 draw against France.

Tordin was first called up to the United States under-20 team in January 2024. The next month, she scored in stoppage time of her debut in a 1–0 friendly win against Colombia. She played for her birth country throughout the year and was selected to the roster for the 2024 FIFA U-20 Women's World Cup. She emerged as the team's top scorer at the tournament with four goals, the most by an American since Maya Hayes in 2012. She scored a hat trick in a 7–0 win over Paraguay in the group stage, becoming the fifth American to score a hat trick at the U-20 World Cup and the first since Savannah DeMelo in 2018. She started five of the last six games as the United States finished in third place, its best result since 2012.

Tordin was called up by Emma Hayes into the Futures Camp, practicing alongside the senior national team, in January 2025. In September 2026, she was called up to the full national team for the first time. She made her first appearance for the senior team, coming on as a substitute in a 2–2 friendly draw against Spain, on October 13, 2026.

== Personal life ==
Tordin is the daughter of Fábio and Cristina Tordin, who immigrated to the United States from Brazil in 2003. Tordin's grandfather Dionisio (known as Nin), her great-grandfather Atílio, and her great-great-uncle Osvaldo were amateur footballers. The trio played for local side Ribeiro Futebol Clube in Valinhos.

== Career statistics ==
=== International ===
As of match played October 13, 2026

National Team	Year	Apps	Goals
United States	2026	1	0
Total		1	0

== Honors and awards ==
Princeton Tigers

- Ivy League: 2024
- Ivy League tournament: 2024

United States U20

- FIFA U-20 Women's World Cup bronze medal: 2024

Individual

- NWSL Rookie of the Month: June 2025, August 2025
- Third-team All-American: 2023
- First-team All-Ivy: 2023, 2024
- Second-team All-Ivy: 2022
- Ivy League Offensive Player of the Year: 2024
- Ivy League Rookie of the Year: 2022
- Ivy League tournament all-tournament team: 2024
