= Hannah Bebar =

American soccer player (born 2001)

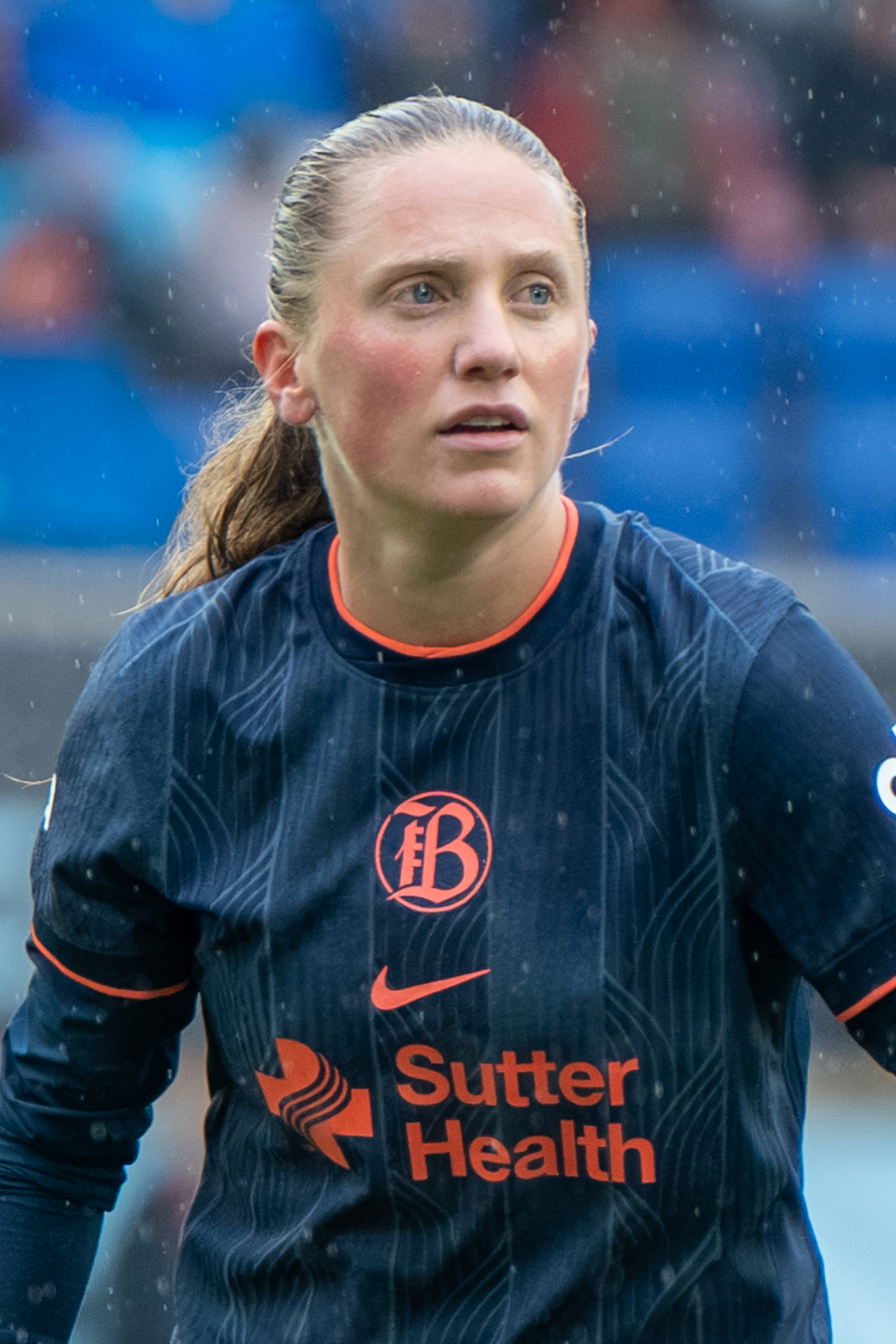
- Bebar with Bay FC in 2026

Personal information
- Full name: Hannah Jacqueline Bebar
- Date of birth: September 5, 2001 (age 25)
- Height: 5 ft 4 in (1.63 m)
- Position: Defensive midfielder

Team information
- Current team: Bay FC
- Number: 41

Youth career
- Galaxy SC
- Eclipse Select SC

College career
| Years | Team | Apps | (Gls) |
| 2021–2023 | Harvard Crimson | 47 | (17) |
| 2024 | Duke Blue Devils | 22 | (3) |

Senior career*
| Years | Team | Apps | (Gls) |
| 2019 | Chicago Red Stars Reserves | 6 | (5) |
| 2024 | North Carolina Courage U23 | 5 | (6) |
| 2025– | Bay FC | 47 | (1) |

International career
| 2017–2018 | United States U-17 | 15 | (2) |
| 2019 | United States U-20 | 3 | (0) |
| 2023 | United States U-23 | | |
- * Club domestic league appearances and goals as of 05:05, November 2, 2026 (UTC)

Hannah Jacqueline Bebar (born September 5, 2001) is an American professional soccer player who plays as a defensive midfielder for Bay FC of the National Women's Soccer League (NWSL). She played college soccer for the Harvard Crimson and the Duke Blue Devils, earning All-American honors three times. She represented the United States at the 2018 FIFA U-17 Women's World Cup.

== Early life ==
Bebar was raised in Naperville, Illinois, one of four children born to James and Jessica Bebar. She grew up playing on boys' teams, featuring for Galaxy SC and later Eclipse Select SC. She played for the Chicago Red Stars Reserves of the WPSL in 2019. She graduated from Waubonsie Valley High School. She was rated by TopDrawerSoccer as the fifth-best recruit of the 2020 class.

== College career ==
Bebar's freshman season with the Harvard Crimson was cancelled due to the COVID-19 pandemic in 2020, leading her to practice during that time with the NWSL's Chicago Red Stars. In her sophomore season, she led the Ivy League with 10 assists and scored 5 goals in 15 games. Harvard reached the NCAA tournament, falling in the first round. Bebar was named the Ivy League Rookie of the Year, first-team All-Ivy, and third-team All-American by United Soccer Coaches. She provided 6 goals and 8 assists in 13 games in her junior season, but missed the end of the season due to a knee injury. She was named first-team All-Ivy and first-team All-American. In her senior season, she provided one goal and one assist across two games of the Ivy League tournament, helping Harvard win the inaugural league tournament. She also had a goal and assist in their first-round 3–0 win against Maine in the NCAA tournament, falling in the next round. She finished the 2023 season with 6 goals with 7 assists in 19 games, earning first-team All-Ivy honors.

Bebar transferred to the Duke Blue Devils for her graduate season in 2024, starting all 22 games and recording 3 goals and 5 assists. She helped Duke go undefeated in the Atlantic Coast Conference to claim the conference regular-season title and reach the semifinals of the NCAA tournament. She was named second-team All-ACC and second-team United Soccer Coaches All-American.

== Club career ==
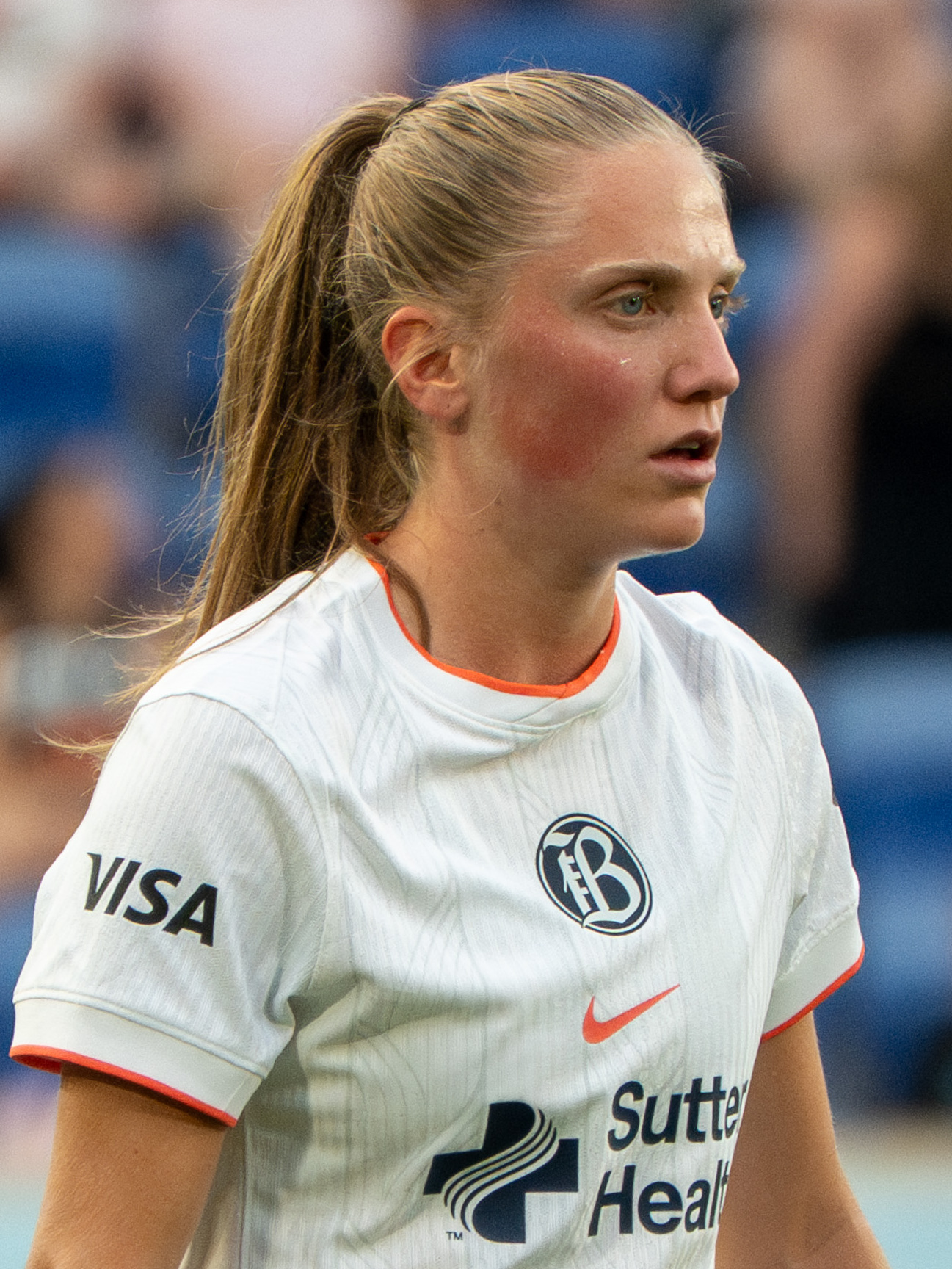
Bebar with Bay FC in 2025

Bay FC announced on February 7, 2025, that they had signed Bebar to her first professional contract on a three-year deal. She made her professional debut on March 22, replacing Dorian Bailey as a second-half substitute in a 2–0 win over Racing Louisville. On May 24, after completing her master's degree at Duke, she made her next appearance and first professional start in a 2–2 draw with the Houston Dash. She finished her rookie season with 17 appearances.

The following season, Bay's new head coach Emma Coates named Bebar and Claire Hutton as vice captains alongside captain Sydney Collins. On August 1, 2026, she scored her first professional goal from the top of the box against the Seattle Reign; she also had a tying assist in the match, but Bay lost 3–2. The following week, she captained Bay for the first time in a 0–0 stalemate with the Chicago Stars. She started all 30 games and scored 1 goal for Bay, leading the club in minutes played. She was rewarded with a three-year extension to tie her to the club through 2030.

== International career ==
Bebar was first called up to the United States youth national team at the under-15 level in 2016. She helped the United States win the 2018 CONCACAF Women's U-17 Championship, scoring in a 3–2 victory over Mexico in the final. She appeared in all 3 games (2 starts) at the 2018 FIFA U-17 Women's World Cup, where the United States did not make it out of group stage. She later appeared in friendlies at the under-20 and under-23 levels.

Bebar received her first senior national team call-up as an injury replacement for Lynn Williams in January 2025.

== Honors and awards ==
Harvard Crimson

- Ivy League tournament: 2023

North Carolina Courage U23

- USL W League: 2024

Duke Blue Devils

- Atlantic Coast Conference: 2024

United States U-17

- CONCACAF Women's U-17 Championship: 2018

Individual

- First-team All-American: 2022
- Second-team All-American: 2024
- Third-team All-American: 2021
- First-team All-Ivy: 2021, 2022, 2023
- Second-team All-ACC: 2024
