= Áslaug Munda Gunnlaugsdóttir =

Icelandic footballer

Personal information
- Full name: Áslaug Munda Gunnlaugsdóttir
- Date of birth: 2 June 2001 (age 25)
- Place of birth: Iceland,
- Positions: Left-back; left wing

Team information
- Current team: Parma

College career
Years	Team	Apps	(Gls)
2021–2024	Harvard Crimson	24	(11)

Senior career*
Years	Team	Apps	(Gls)
2016–2017	Völsungur	22	(7)
2018–2025	Breiðablik	137	(6)
2026–	Parma	4	(0)

International career
2017	Iceland U16	6	(1)
2017–2018	Iceland U17	5	(0)
2018–2019	Iceland U19	21	(1)
2019–	Iceland	16	(0)
- * Club domestic league appearances and goals as of 4 April 2026

Áslaug Munda Gunnlaugsdóttir (born 2 June 2001) is an Icelandic professional footballer who plays for Serie A club Parma and the Iceland women's national football team.

== Club career ==
Áslaug Munda started playing youth football in the town of Egilsstaðir before playing her first senior team games with Völsungur from Húsavík at the age of 15. In 2018, she joined Úrvalsdeild kvenna club Breiðablik.

She played college soccer for Harvard Crimson women's soccer.

On 12 January 2026, Áslaug Munda joined Serie A club Parma.

== International career ==
Áslaug Munda made her national team debut in June 2019 against Finland.

On 13 June 2025, Áslaug Munda was called up to the Iceland squad for the UEFA Women's Euro 2025.

== Titles ==
- Úrvalsdeild kvenna:
  - 2018
- Icelandic Cup:
  - 2018
- Icelandic Super Cup:
  - 2019
- Icelandic League Cup:
  - 2019
