= Josefine Hasbo =

Danish footballer (born 2001)

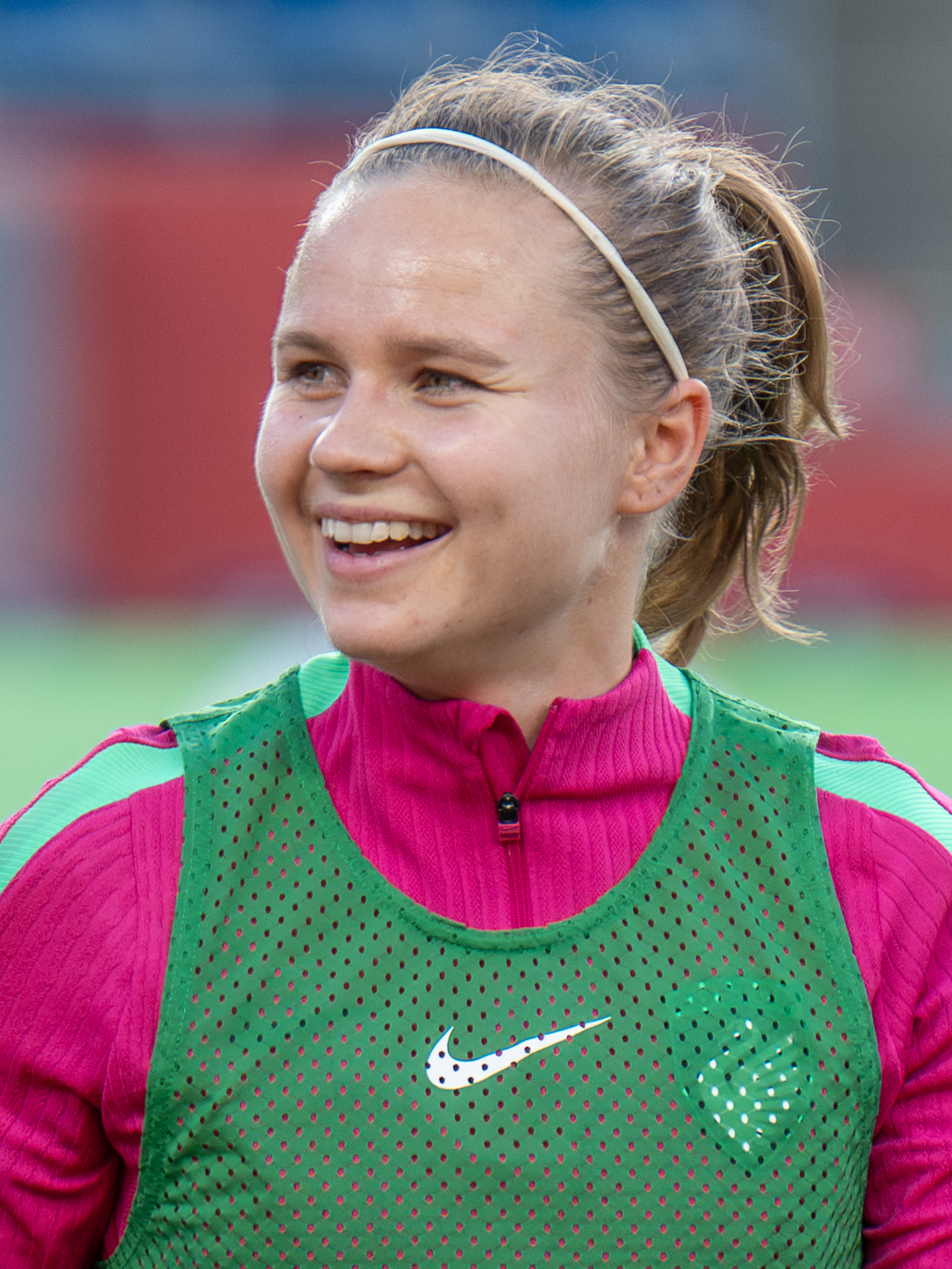
- Hasbo with the Boston Legacy in 2026

Personal information
- Full name: Josefine Hasbo
- Date of birth: 20 November 2001 (age 24)
- Place of birth: Copenhagen, Denmark
- Height: 1.62 m (5 ft 4 in)
- Position: Midfielder

Team information
- Current team: Boston Legacy
- Number: 5

College career
| Years | Team | Apps | (Gls) |
| 2021–2024 | Harvard Crimson | 55 | (25) |

Senior career*
| Years | Team | Apps | (Gls) |
| 2017–2018 | BSF | | |
| 2018–2021 | Brøndby IF | 52 | (11) |
| 2025 | Gotham FC | 11 | (1) |
| 2026– | Boston Legacy | 21 | (0) |

International career^{‡}
| 2016–2017 | Denmark U16 | 6 | (2) |
| 2016–2018 | Denmark U17 | 12 | (3) |
| 2018–2019 | Denmark U19 | 17 | (7) |
| 2019– | Denmark U23 | 1 | (1) |
| 2020– | Denmark | 40 | (3) |
- * Club domestic league appearances and goals as of 02:13, 8 November 2026 (UTC) ‡ National team caps and goals as of 10 Jun 2026

Josefine Hasbo (born 20 November 2001) is a Danish professional footballer who plays as a midfielder for Boston Legacy FC of the National Women's Soccer League (NWSL) and the Danish national team. She graduated from Harvard University with a double degree in economics and psychology. While playing college soccer for the Harvard Crimson, Hasbo represented Denmark at the 2023 FIFA World Cup and 2025 UEFA Euro.

== Early career ==
Hasbo joined Brøndby IF, one of Denmark's leading clubs, in the summer of 2018. She quickly broke into the Danish A-Liga (then known as the Gjensidige Women's League) where she emerged as one of Denmark's best young players. With Brøndby, she helped the team win the 2019 league championship and reach the Danish Cup final. Hasbo also competed in consecutive UEFA Champions League campaigns, reaching the quarterfinals in both 2019–20 and 2020–21. She was named Woman of the Match against Glasgow City in the 2019–20 quarterfinals, scored in the round of 16 against Vålerenga, and started both matches against Lyon in the 2020–21 quarterfinals. Her domestic performances earned her selection to Gjensidige's Team of the Year in 2019–20 and a nomination as a finalist for Danish Female Footballer of the Year.

== College career ==
Josefine Hasbo played four seasons (from 2021 to 2024) as a central midfielder for the Harvard Crimson, scoring 25 goals and providing 17 assists in 55 appearances. She ranks ninth all-time in career points, ninth in career goals, and tied for 13th in career assists, despite missing multiple games during her sophomore, junior, and senior years while participating in senior national team call-ups and tournaments for Denmark.

In her junior season in 2023, Hasbo scored a hat-trick in the Ivy League tournament final, leading Harvard to a 3–0 victory over Columbia and securing the conference title. She was named the tournament's Most Outstanding Player, was a unanimous First-Team All-Ivy League selection, and earned United Soccer Coaches First-Team All-America honors. She was also recognized as a semifinalist for the MAC Hermann Trophy.

During the summers following her sophomore and senior years, Hasbo represented Denmark at the 2023 FIFA World Cup and 2025 UEFA Euro. She was the first student in Harvard University history to represent her home country in the FIFA Women's World Cup.

In her senior year, Hasbo was one of three finalists for the Harvard 2025 Mary G. Paget Prize, an annual honor awarded to student-athletes who make the most outstanding contributions to women's athletics.

In interviews, Hasbo has described the challenge of balancing her responsibilities as a student-athlete at Harvard University with frequent travel to Europe every two to three months for training camps and matches with the Denmark women's national football team. While completing a double degree under the same academic requirements as other Harvard students, she completed much of her coursework while traveling, often studying on buses and flights. During national team camps, Hasbo has said that while teammates spent their downtime socializing, she frequently remained in the hotel to work on academic assignments. She also recalled taking a Harvard econometrics midterm examination remotely while with the Denmark national team in Iceland during UEFA Nations League matches, sitting the exam simultaneously with other students on campus, with a member of the Danish national team staff serving as the exam proctor.

== Club career ==
=== Gotham FC ===
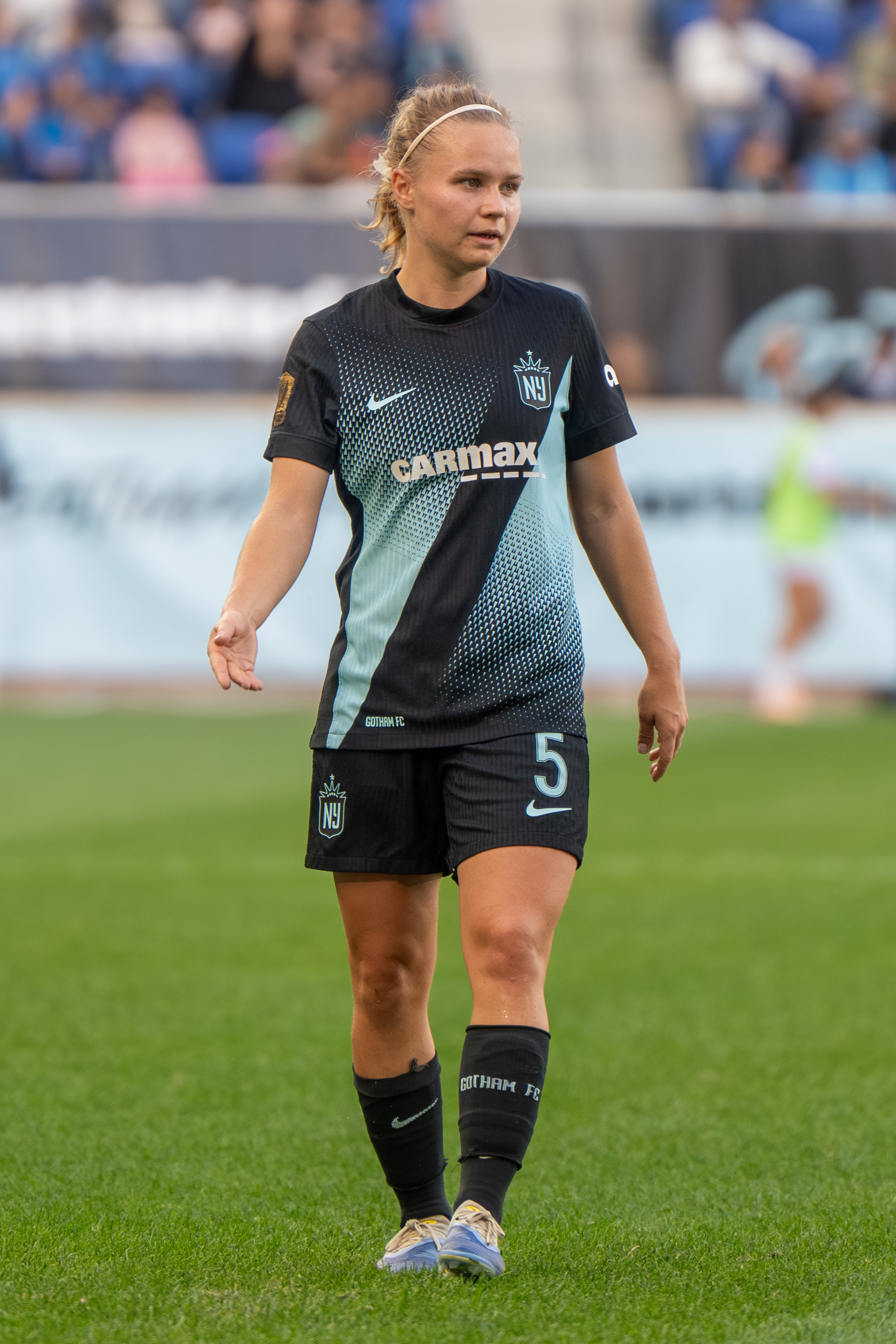
Hasbo with Gotham FC in 2025

After completing her studies at Harvard University in the summer of 2025, Hasbo joined Gotham FC on Jun 10, 2025, signing a multi-year contract through 2027. She made her immediate Gotham debut on 21 June 2025, coming on at the start of the second half and playing 45 minutes in a 2–1 victory over Bay FC. Hasbo recorded her first professional assist on 12 August 2025, contributing to Gotham's 2–0 win over Monterrey in the CONCACAF W Champions Cup. She scored her first Gotham goal on 17 September 2025, heading in a cross from Kayla Duran in a CONCACAF W Champions Cup match against the Vancouver Rise Academy.

Since joining Gotham FC midway through the 2025 season, Hasbo established herself as a key contributor in the club's midfield, playing an important role during the team's 11-match unbeaten run in the second half of the 2025 NWSL regular season. In her NWSL rookie season, despite joining the club midseason and missing much of Gotham's summer activities while representing Denmark at the 2025 UEFA Euro, Hasbo appeared in 15 of Gotham's 21 matches played after her arrival, including two NWSL playoff appearances, logging a total of 935 minutes. As a regular starter in the team's midfield, Hasbo helped carry Gotham FC, the eighth-seeded playoff qualifier, to win the 2025 NWSL Championship. In January 2026, Hasbo was named to Gotham FC's squad for the inaugural FIFA Women's Champions Cup in London.

=== Boston Legacy ===
In February 2026, Gotham FC traded Hasbo to Boston Legacy FC in exchange for $50,000 in allocation money. On March 14, 2026, just days after returning from international duty with the Denmark national team, Hasbo made her Boston Legacy debut in the club's inaugural match, coming on as a substitute against her former club Gotham FC in front of a crowd of 30,207. She played the full 90 minutes in both the club's first league point, a 2–2 draw against the North Carolina Courage on April 29, and its first win, a 3–2 home victory over Denver Summit FC on May 3. As of 1 June 2026, she has appeared in every match of Boston Legacy's inaugural season, starting each of the team's last eight matches.

== International career ==
At age 18, Hasbo made her senior international debut on 7 March 2020 against Sweden at the 2020 Algarve Cup. It made her one of the youngest players ever to be selected for the full Danish national team.

Hasbo was called up to represent Denmark at the 2023 FIFA World Cup in the summer following her sophomore year, becoming the only non-professional player on Denmark's roster while completing her studies at Harvard. She played in all four matches of the tournament, starting in two — against China and England — as Denmark advanced from the group stage before being eliminated by Australia in the round of 16.

In a 2025 DR1 and DRTV documentary series, The Danish National Team – The Dream of the Euros, it was revealed that during a Euro 2025 qualifier against the Czech Republic in April 2024, Hasbo suffered multiple broken ribs after a tackle. Despite the injury, she continued playing and later scored the final goal that secured Denmark's victory.

Right after her Harvard graduation ceremony, Hasbo was named to Denmark's squad for the UEFA Euro 2025 in Switzerland. She played in all three of Denmark's group-stage matches before the team was eliminated from the tournament.

On 9 June 2026, Hasbo helped Denmark to a 4–1 away victory over Serbia on the final matchday of UEFA qualifying, as Denmark topped League A Group A1 to earn direct qualification for the 2027 FIFA Women's World Cup. Named in every Denmark squad throughout the campaign, Hasbo was part of a side that went unbeaten through the group, with four wins and two draws against Italy, Sweden and Serbia.

== International goals ==
| No. | Date | Venue | Opponent | Score | Result | Competition |
|---|---|---|---|---|---|---|
| 1. | 1 September 2022 | Viborg Stadium, Viborg, Denmark | Montenegro | 5–1 | 5–1 | 2023 World Cup qualification |
| 2. | 18 February 2023 | Stade Francis Le Basser, Laval, France | Norway | 1–0 | 2–0 | 2023 Tournoi de France |
| 3. | 5 April 2024 | Městský fotbalový stadion, Uherské Hradiště, Czech Republic | Czech Republic | 3–1 | 3–1 | Euro 2025 qualifying |

== Career statistics ==
=== Club ===
As of June 1, 2026

Appearances and goals by club, season and competition
| Club | Season | League | | Continental (Note: Includes UEFA Women's Champions League and CONCACAF W Champions Cup) | | Total | |
| Club | Season | Apps | Goals | Apps | Goals | Apps | Goals |
|---|---|---|---|---|---|---|---|
| Brøndby IF | 2019-21 | — | | | | 52 | 11 |
| Harvard Crimson | 2021 | — | | | | 11 | 2 |
| Harvard Crimson | 2022 | — | | | | 13 | 6 |
| Harvard Crimson | 2023 | — | | | | 16 | 10 |
| Harvard Crimson | 2024 | — | | | | 15 | 7 |
| Gotham FC | 2025 | 11 | 0 | 4 | 1 | 15 | 1 |
| Boston Legacy FC | 2026 | 12 | 0 | — | — | 12 | 0 |

== Style of play ==
Harvard head coach Chris Hamblin described Hasbo as “her ability to cover ground and go box-to-box are second to none. She also has a really unique ability to understand time and space, to be able to get out of very tight situations, and almost think two plays ahead.”

At the professional level, reports have highlighted her work rate, positional intelligence, and ability to link defense and attack through efficient passing. Her coaches and media coverage have described her as a technically composed and tactically disciplined player who contributes to both pressing and possession phases.

She was described by supporters as “the unsung hero” of Gotham's midfield during the team's extended unbeaten run. Some fans have also referred to themselves humorously as “Hasbo-lievers.”

== Personal life ==
Hasbo is active as a social entrepreneur and advocate for sports inclusion.

Off the field, Hasbo served as president of Harvard's Women in Entrepreneurship Club.

She serves on the board of Spillerforeningen, the representative body for professional footballers in Denmark.

In November 2025, Hasbo was selected as the 2025 recipient of the Skau Reipurth Next Generation Scholarship, an annual award granted to a single individual in recognition of exceptional promise and societal impact in their field.

== Football and social impact ==
Hasbo serves on the board of directors at Sport Creates Memories, a Denmark-based nonprofit that uses grassroots football development to support underserved children and communities across Africa. She is also a co-founder of a football academy in Ghana aimed at expanding access to sport and education for children from low-income backgrounds.

In interviews, Hasbo has described dedicating much of her time away from training to volunteer work with Sport Creates Memories, usually spending several hours per day during the season on organizational and program-related efforts. During winter breaks in college and the off-season as a professional, she has traveled to Ghana to support local initiatives, typically volunteering for multiple weeks at a time and working 12 to 15 hours per day to help develop grassroots football programs and promote social inclusion among local youth.

Reflecting on her involvement, Hasbo has said that football should serve “as a doorway to dreams, confidence, and opportunity,” rather than a privilege, and that her work with Sport Creates Memories reflects her belief in sport as a tool for both personal and community development.

== Media and Broadcasting ==
During the 2026 FIFA World Cup, Hasbo served as a football expert for DR, Denmark's national public broadcaster. She contributed to DR's tournament coverage in a dual capacity, both as a studio analyst in Denmark and as an on-site reporter at match venues in the United States across multiple games of the tournament.

== Partnerships and endorsements ==
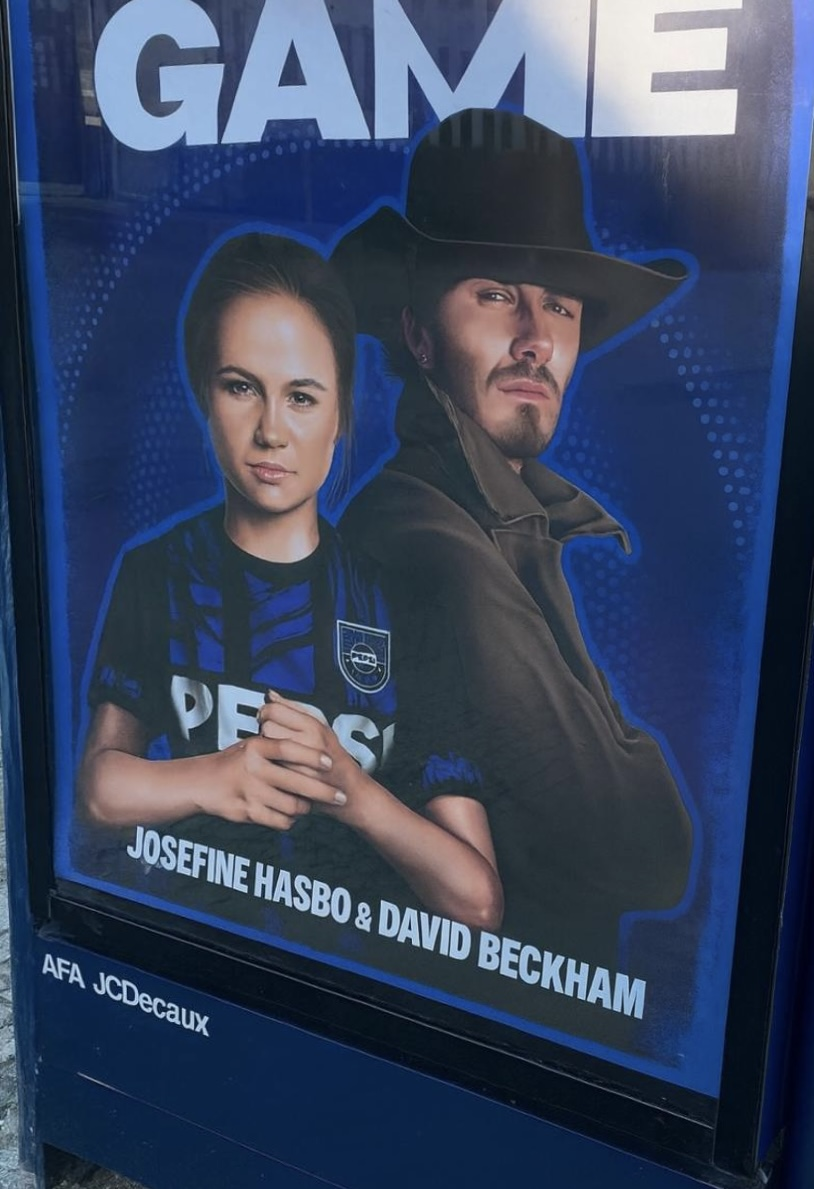
Josefine Hasbo and David Beckham featured together in a poster in Copenhagen in 2025

She represents and has represented global brands including Pepsi, Nike, and G-Form. Hasbo serves as Pepsi's global female football ambassador, alongside international stars such as Alexia Putellas, Caroline Graham Hansen, Farah Jefry, and Lauren James.

Ahead of the UEFA Women's Euro 2025, Pepsi released a special-edition can in Denmark featuring Hasbo's image, as part of its European women's football campaign. She was also featured alongside David Beckham in a Pepsi advertisement in Denmark in 2025.

== Honours ==
Brøndby IF

- A-Liga: Winner of the championship 2019
- Danish Women's Cup runners-up: 2019

Harvard Crimson

- Ivy League women's soccer tournament: 2023

Gotham FC

- NWSL Championship: 2025
