= 2025 Ivy League women's soccer tournament =

- Classification: Division I
- Teams: 4
- Matches: 3
- Attendance: 3,306
- Site: Roberts Stadium; Princeton, New Jersey
- Champions: Dartmouth (1st title)
- Winning coach: Taylor Schram (1st title)
- MVP: Stephanie Lathrop (Dartmouth)
- Broadcast: ESPN+

2025 Ivy League women's soccer standings
	Conf.						Overall
Team	W		L		T	PCT	W		L		T	PCT
Princeton ‍†‍‍	5	–	2	–	0	.714	8	–	6	–	3	.559
Dartmouth ‍‍‡‍^{y}	4	–	1	–	2	.714	12	–	4	–	4	.700
Columbia ‍‍‍	4	–	2	–	1	.643	6	–	7	–	3	.469
Brown ‍‍‍	3	–	2	–	2	.571	9	–	4	–	4	.647
Harvard ‍‍‍	3	–	3	–	1	.500	5	–	6	–	3	.464
Penn ‍‍‍	1	–	3	–	3	.357	5	–	4	–	6	.533
Cornell ‍‍‍	2	–	5	–	0	.286	5	–	7	–	4	.438
Yale ‍‍‍	1	–	5	–	1	.214	3	–	11	–	1	.233
† – Conference champion ‡ – 2025 Ivy League Tournament champion y – Invited to the NCAA Tournament; As of December 9, 2025; Rankings from United Soccer Coaches Poll; Source:Ivy League

The 2025 Ivy League women's soccer tournament was the third postseason women's soccer tournament for the Ivy League, held on November 6 and 9, 2025. The tournament was hosted at Roberts Stadium in Princeton, New Jersey, home of the regular season champions, Princeton. The four team-team single-elimination tournament consisted of two rounds based on seeding from regular season conference play. Princeton were the defending champions but were unable to defend their title as the first seed. Dartmouth defeated Princeton in the Final 1–0. This was the first tournament title for Dartmouth, and the first for head coach Taylor Schram. As tournament champions, Dartmouth earned the Ivy League's automatic berth into the 2025 NCAA Division I women's soccer tournament.

== Seeding ==
The top four Ivy League teams from the regular season earned a spot in the tournament and teams were seeded by conference record. No tiebreakers were required as each of the top five teams finished with unique conference records.

Seed	School	Conference Record	Points
1	Princeton	5–2–0	15
2	Dartmouth	4–1–2	14
3	Columbia	4–2–1	13
4	Brown	3–2–2	11

== Bracket ==
Semifinals; Thursday, Nov. 6
1	Princeton	3
4	Brown	0
2	Dartmouth	1
3	Columbia	0

Final; Sunday, Nov. 9
1	Princeton	0
2	Dartmouth	1

== Schedule ==
=== Semifinals ===
November 6	(2) Dartmouth	1–0	(3) Columbia	Princeton, NJ
3:30 p.m. EST	Stephanie Lathrop 25'	Report	(yellow card) 86' Team	Stadium: Roberts Stadium; Attendance: 625; Referee: Zachary Smith; Assistant referees: Jeremy Roseman; Connor Petrauskas; Fourth official: Nate Penn

November 6	(1) Princeton	3–0	(4) Brown	Princeton, NJ
7:00 p.m. EST	Kayla Wong 27', 37'; Nina Cantor (yellow card) 73'; Isabella Garces 85'	Report	(yellow card) 42' Joy Okonye; (red card) 63' Ayla Sahin; (yellow card) 68' Naya Cardoza	Stadium: Roberts Stadium; Attendance: 1,213; Referee: Katherine Mitchell; Assistant referees: Jeffrey Panciera; Conor McCloskey; Fourth official: Danielle Cornetta

=== Final ===
November 9	(1) Princeton	0–1	(2) Dartmouth	Princeton, NJ
1:00 p.m. EST		Report	63' Stephanie Lathrop; (yellow card) 89' Mary Lundregan	Stadium: Roberts Stadium; Attendance: 1,468; Referee: Cedric Cook; Assistant referees: Aran Hart; Kevin Cavalcanti; Fourth official: Timmothy Bramble

== Statistics ==
=== Goalscorers ===
There were 5 goals scored in 3 matches, for an average of 1.67 goals per match (as of November 9, 2025).

2 goals

- Stephanie Lathrop – Dartmouth
- Kayla Wong – Princeton

1 goal

- Isabella Garces – Princeton

== All-Tournament team ==
Player	Team
Naya Cardoza	Brown
Layla Shell	Brown
Justina Bitzer	Columbia
Maia Tabion	Columbia
Ola Goebel	Dartmouth
**Stephanie Lathrop**	Dartmouth
Lourdes Lauterborn	Dartmouth
Anna Leschly	Dartmouth
Drew Coomans	Princeton
Kayla Wong	Princeton
Kelsee Wozniak	Princeton

MVP in bold
