= Jade Rose =

Canadian soccer player (born 2003)

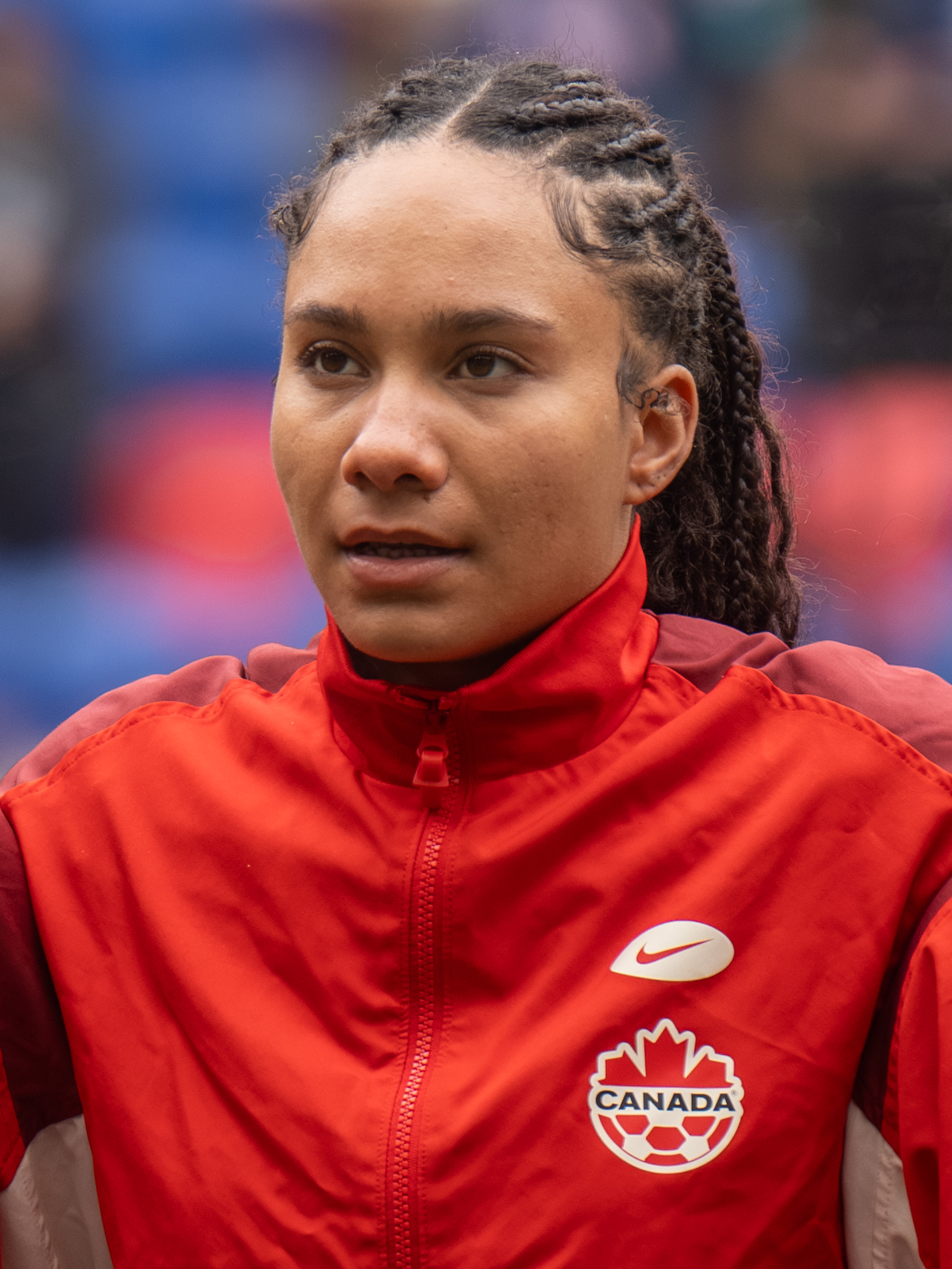
- Rose with Canada in 2026

Personal information
- Full name: Jade Elizabeth Rose
- Date of birth: February 12, 2003 (age 23)
- Place of birth: Markham, Ontario, Canada
- Height: 5 ft 10 in (1.78 m)
- Position: Centre-back

Team information
- Current team: Manchester City
- Number: 4

Youth career
- Markham SC
- Unionville-Milliken SC
- Toronto International YFC
- NDC Ontario

College career
Years	Team	Apps	(Gls)
2021–2024	Harvard Crimson	26	(2)

Senior career*
Years	Team	Apps	(Gls)
2017	Unionville Milliken SC	3	(0)
2022	NDC Ontario	11	(0)
2023	FC Premier Women		(1)
2025–	Manchester City	31	(2)

International career^{‡}
2018	Canada U15	4	(0)
2018	Canada U17	8	(0)
2020–	Canada U20	15	(0)
2021–	Canada	43	(1)
- * Club domestic league appearances and goals as of November 22, 2026 ‡ National team caps and goals as of October 12, 2026

Jade Elizabeth Rose (born February 12, 2003) is a Canadian professional soccer player who plays as a centre-back for Women's Super League club Manchester City and the Canadian national team.

== Early life ==
Rose began playing soccer with the Markham SC, before moving onto Unionville-Milliken SC, and then to the NDC Ontario Regional Excel (REX) Program.

== College career ==
Rose was first approached by the Harvard Crimson women's soccer coaching staff in 2018. Rose committed to join Harvard University for the 2021–22 school year, also playing for the women's soccer team. on her choice to join Harvard, she said "I chose Harvard because education has always been a massive part of my life, my journey. I think having something to fall back on as a women's footballer is important and because it's something I value." She scored her first collegiate goal on September 2, 2021 against the Boston University Terriers. She scored her first game-winning goal, in double overtime, on September 15, 2021 against the Northeastern Huskies. After a strong first year with the Crimson, she was named to the All-Ivy First Team and All-East Region First Team, the Top Drawer Soccer First-year Best XI, and was one of only three Ivy Leaguers named to the United Soccer Coaches' 2022 Women's Players to Watch list, as well as the MAC Hermann Trophy Watch List.

After her sophomore season, she was named the Ivy League Defensive Player of the Year, as well as an Ivy League First Team All-Star. She was also named to the All-New England First-Team, a United Soccer Coaches Second Team All-American and All-East Region First Team.

== Club career ==
As a teenager, Rose played for Unionville-Milliken SC in League1 Ontario during the 2017 season, and with NDC Ontario in 2022. She later played for FC Premier Women in the American Women's Premier Soccer League for the 2023 season.

On June 18, 2025, it was announced that Rose had signed her first professional contract, joining Women's Super League club Manchester City on a contract through to the summer of 2029 and becoming City's first signing of the 2025 summer. She scored her first WSL goal in the final game of the 2025–26 season on May 16, a 4–1 rout of West Ham United. Rose and Manchester City won both the league championship and the 2025–26 Women's FA Cup.

== International career ==
Early in her junior career, Rose represented Canada at the 2018 CONCACAF Girls' Under-15 Championship, 2018 CONCACAF Women's U-17 Championship, 2018 FIFA U-17 Women's World Cup, and 2020 CONCACAF Women's U-20 Championship. In 2019, she was invited to a camp for the senior team for the first time. She was named the Canadian Youth International Female Player of the Year in 2020, after finishing as runner-up in 2019. In December 2021, she won the distinction for the second time.

Rose was named to the Canadian senior squad for the 2021 SheBelieves Cup, where she made her debut on February 21 against Argentina.

Joining Canada's U20 team again for 2022, Rose was named its captain in advance of the 2022 CONCACAF Women's U-20 Championship. The team finished in third place, in the process qualifying for the 2022 FIFA U-20 Women's World Cup, where Rose also competed. Following the U20 World Cup, Rose was called up to join Canada's senior team for two friendly matches played overseas against Australia. She took the field in the second match on September 6, and earned wide praise for her performance, both for success at frustrating Australian star forward Sam Kerr and for setting up the game-winning goal by Adriana Leon. The Guardian dubbed her "the star of the show."

Rose was named to Canada's squad for the 2023 FIFA Women's World Cup but was forced to withdraw due to injury. In September, she was called up again for the CONCACAF Olympic qualification playoff against Jamaica. With the World Cup having been a disappointment for the Canadian team, coach Bev Priestman opted to reorganize, which included starting Rose in both matches as part of a new defensive configuration. Canada defeated Jamaica to qualify for the 2024 Summer Olympics. In 2023, she was named Canada's Young Player of the Year for the third time in four years.

Joining the squad for the inaugural edition of the CONCACAF W Gold Cup, Rose played the full 90 minutes in two of Canada's three group stage games, and the full 120 minutes in both the quarter- and semi-finals, which ultimately saw Canada lose to the United States on penalties. Commentary posited that the tournament established Rose as having "seemingly locked in her spot" in the team's starting lineup. Rose was named Canada squad for the 2024 Summer Olympics.

On April 4, 2025, she scored her first senior international goal, netting the first goal in a 3–0 victory in a friendly against Argentina.

== Personal life ==
She is the older sister of fellow soccer player Nyah Rose.

== Career statistics ==
=== Club ===
As of match played November 22, 2026

Appearances and goals by club, season and competition
Club	Season	League			National cup (Note: Includes Women's FA Cup)		League cup (Note: Includes Women's League Cup)		Continental (Note: Includes UEFA Women's Champions League)		Total	
Club	Season	Division	Apps	Goals	Apps	Goals	Apps	Goals	Apps	Goals	Apps	Goals
Manchester City	2025–26	Women's Super League	20	1	4	0	5	1	—		29	2
Manchester City	2026–27	Women's Super League	11	1	0	0	—		4	0	15	1
Manchester City	Total		31	2	4	0	5	1	4	0	44	3
Career total			31	2	4	0	5	1	4	0	44	3

=== International ===
As of match played October 12, 2026

Appearances and goals by national team and year
National team	Year	Apps	Goals
Canada	2021	2	0
Canada	2022	2	0
Canada	2023	9	0
Canada	2024	14	0
Canada	2025	8	1
Canada	2026	8	0
Total		43	1

Scores and results list Canada's goal tally first, score column indicates score after each Rose goal.

List of international goals scored by Jade Rose
No.	Date	Venue	Opponent	Score	Result	Competition
1	4 April 2025	BC Place, Vancouver, Canada	Argentina	1–0	3–0	Friendly

== Honours ==
Manchester City

- Women's Super League: 2025–26
- Women's FA Cup: 2025–26
