= Stevenson Field =

Stadium in Providence, Rhode Island

Stevenson–Pincince Field
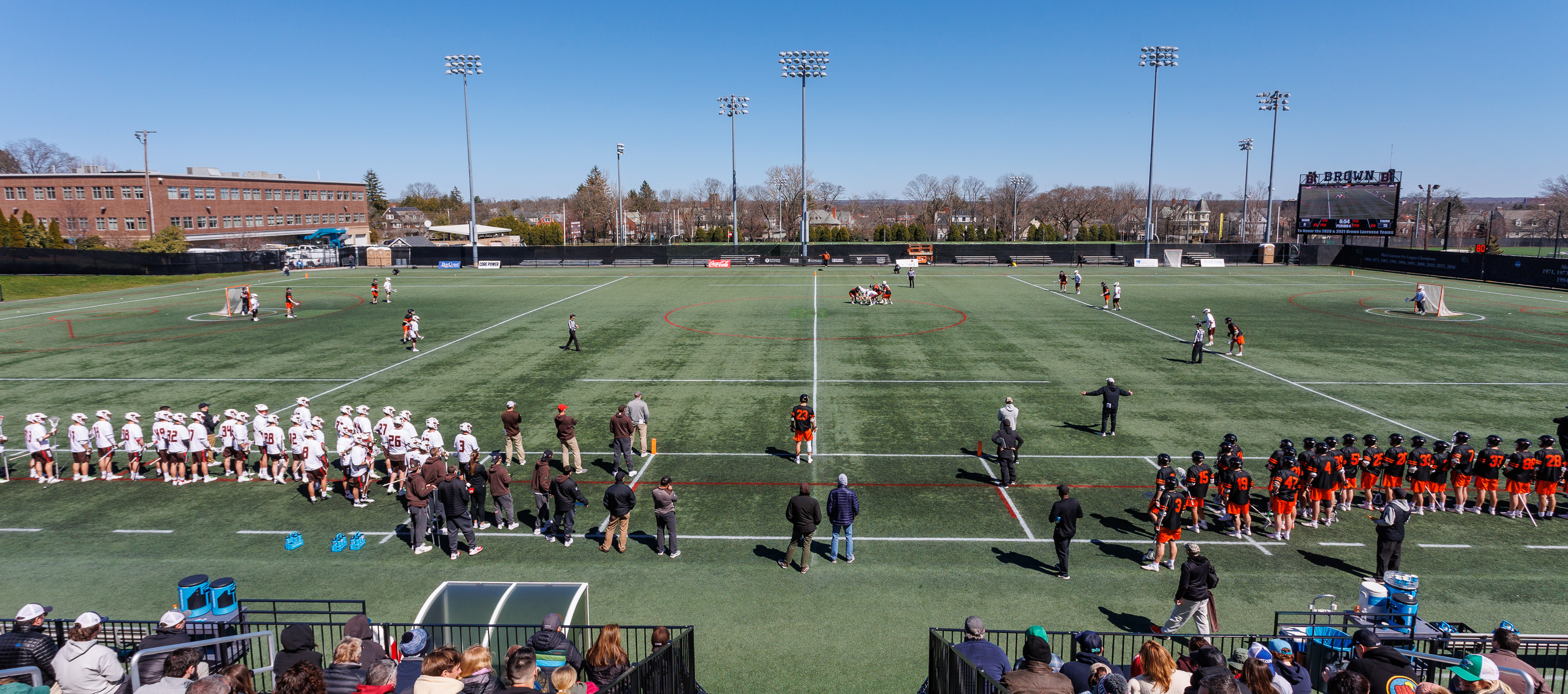
- Lacrosse game in 2022
- Interactive map of Stevenson–Pincince Field
- Location: Providence, RI 02906
- Coordinates: 41.831872°N 71.395512°W
- Owner: Brown University
- Operator: Brown University Athletics
- Capacity: 3,500
- Surface: Artificial turf
- Current use: Soccer; Lacrosse

Construction
- Opened: 1979; 47 years ago

Tenants
- Brown Bears (NCAA) teams: men's and women's soccer (1979-present); men's and women's lacrosse (1979-present)

Website
- brownbears.com/stevenson-pincince-field

Stevenson–Pincince Field is a stadium in Providence, Rhode Island, on the campus of Brown University. It is home to the Brown Bears soccer and lacrosse programs.

== Name ==
The stadium was named in 1979 for longtime men's soccer coach Cliff Stevenson, who was successful in establishing a men's soccer program at Brown during the 1960s. In 2015, the facility was renamed Stevenson–Pincince Field to also honor longtime women's soccer coach Phil Pincince.

== Description and history ==
The stadium seats 3,500 and has hosted games in both the NCAA soccer and lacrosse tournaments. In 2001 and again in 2012, Stevenson–Pincince Field received upgrades to its lighting and field surface.

On April 3, 2019, Brown University announced that the aluminum bleachers and pressbox would be replaced with a new 3-story, 22,500 sf stadium facility, complete with dedicated team locker rooms and training, coaches' offices, and public restrooms and concessions. The facility was completed in February 2020.
