= Heather MacNab =

American soccer player (born 2001)

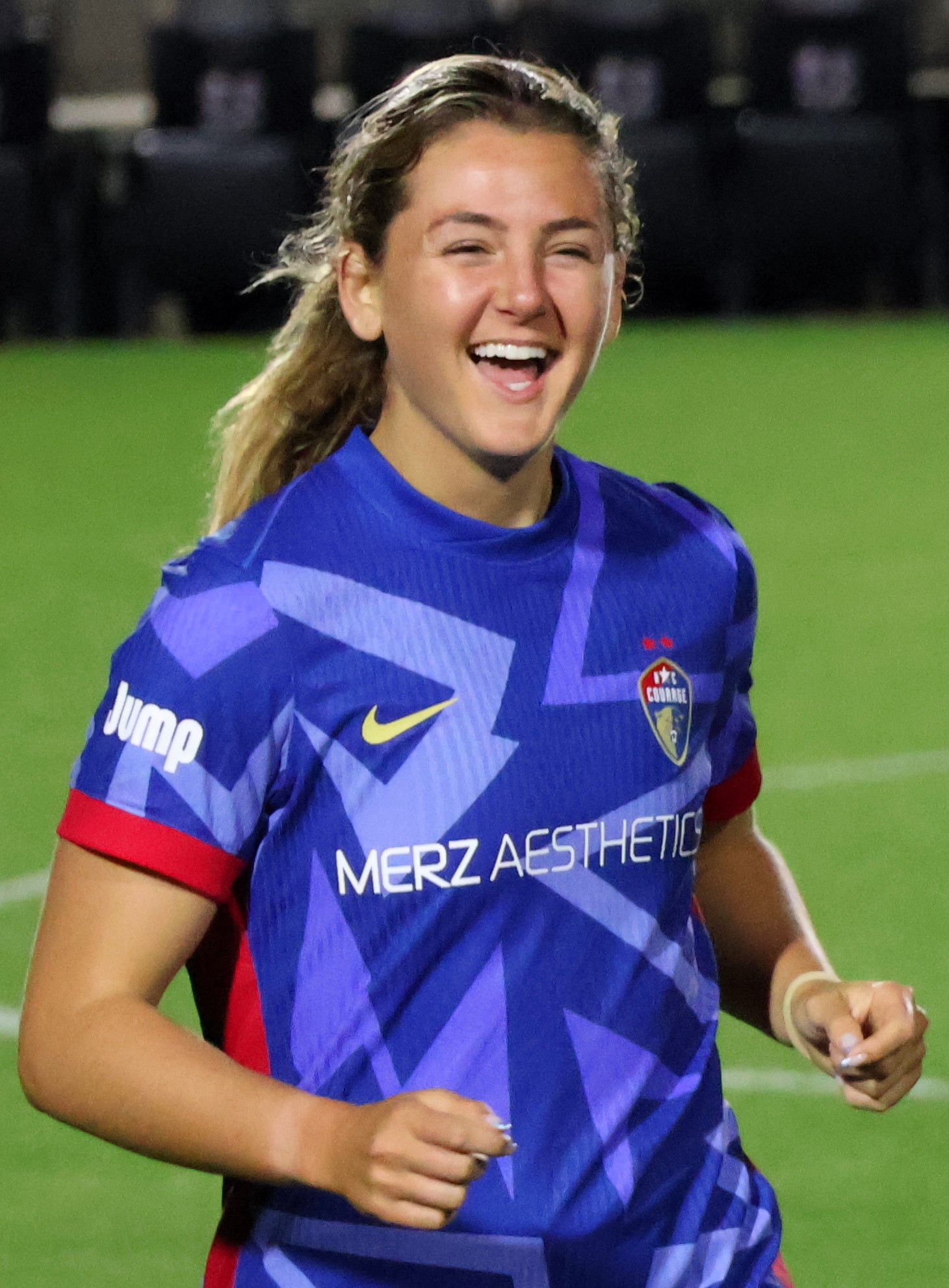
- MacNab with the North Carolina Courage in 2025

Personal information
- Date of birth: October 9, 2001 (age 25)
- Height: 5 ft 10 in (1.78 m)
- Positions: Forward; left back

Team information
- Current team: Dallas Trinity
- Number: 88

College career
| Years | Team | Apps | (Gls) |
| 2021–2024 | Princeton Tigers | 72 | (13) |

Senior career*
| Years | Team | Apps | (Gls) |
| 2025 | North Carolina Courage | 2 | (0) |
| 2026– | Dallas Trinity | 0 | (0) |
- * Club domestic league appearances and goals as of August 5, 2026

Heather MacNab (born October 9, 2001) is an American professional soccer player who plays as a forward or left back for USL Super League club Dallas Trinity FC. She played college soccer for the Princeton Tigers and began her professional career with the North Carolina Courage in 2025.

== Early life ==
MacNab grew up in Carmel, Indiana, north of Indianapolis. She attended Culver Academies, earning three-time MVP honors and two-time all-state honors on the soccer team. She played club soccer for FC Pride. She committed to play college soccer at Princeton before her junior year.

== College career ==
When the Ivy League cancelled fall sports due to the COVID-19 pandemic in 2020, MacNab took a gap year before starting college. The following summer, she played for Lady Victory FC in the Women's Premier Soccer League. In her freshman season at Princeton, MacNab led the team with 7 assists and scored 3 goals in 19 games in 2021. She earned honorable mention All-Ivy honors as a sophomore after scoring a career-high 6 goals with 2 assists in 17 games in 2022. She then played in the summer with USL W League club Indy Eleven.

MacNab dealt with injury to start her junior year in 2023, finishing the season with 2 goals and 6 assists in 19 games. Though listed on the roster as a forward, she was deployed all over the field by head coach Sean Driscoll in her first few seasons before establishing herself as the starting left back in her senior year in 2024. One of the team's captains, she started 17 games and recorded 2 goals and 9 assists, earning first-team All-Ivy honors. She assisted both goals in the 2–0 win against Brown in the Ivy League tournament final.

== Club career ==
MacNab joined the North Carolina Courage as a non-roster trialist in the 2025 preseason. On March 21, the Courage signed MacNab to her first professional contract on injury replacement terms. After the deal expired in mid-April, she kept training with the Courage, and on September 5, she signed a guaranteed contract for the remainder of the season. Eight days later, acting head coach Nathan Thackeray handed MacNab her professional debut as a stoppage-time substitute for Manaka Matsukubo in a 2–1 victory over Angel City FC.

On August 5, 2026, it was announced that MacNab had signed for USL Super League club Dallas Trinity FC.

== Honors and awards ==
Princeton Tigers

- Ivy League tournament: 2024

Individual

- First-team All-Ivy: 2024
