= Roberts Stadium (New Jersey) =

Razed sports field at Princeton University, New Jersey, US

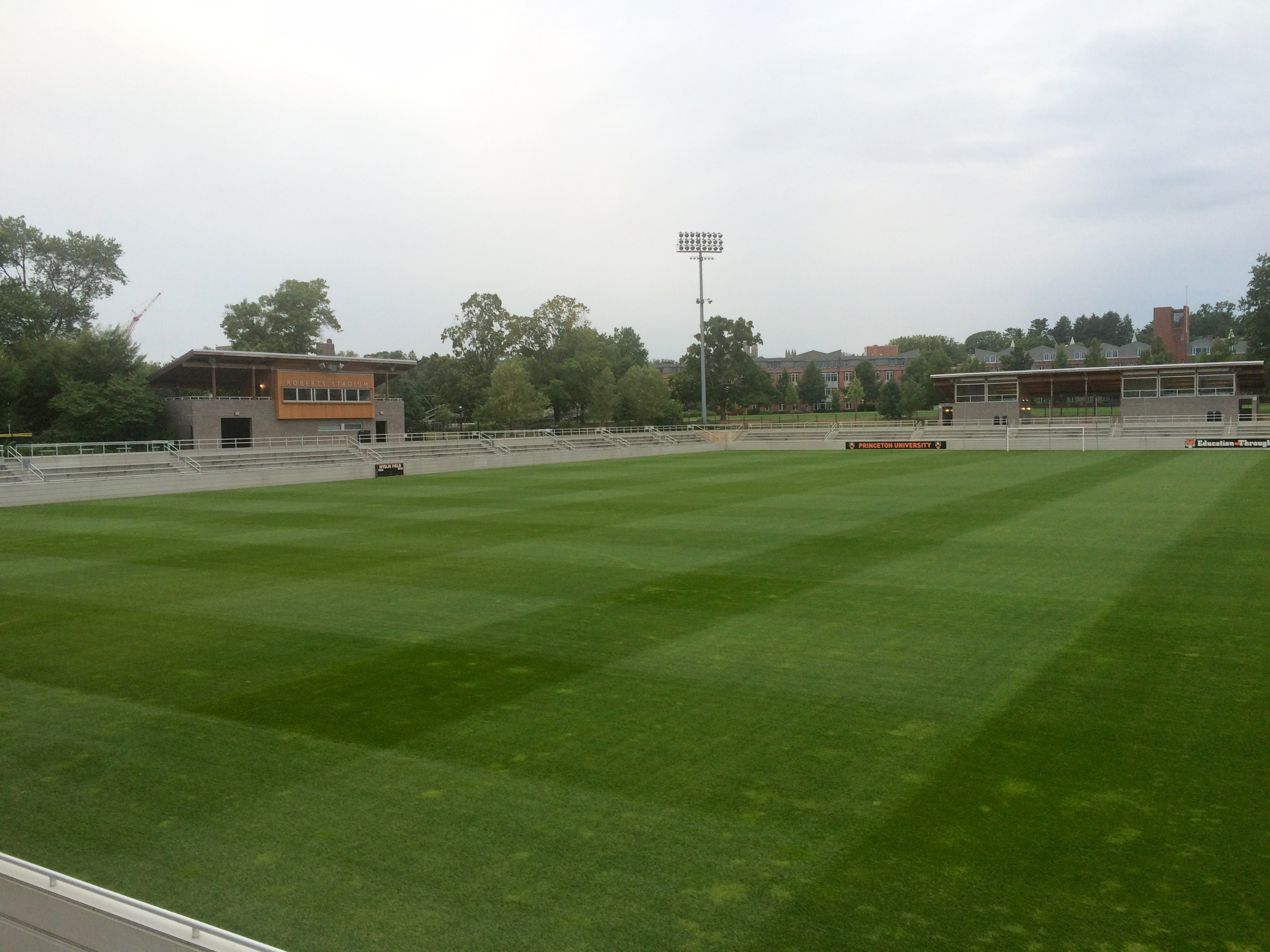
- Interior view of the stadium in 2015
- Interactive map of Roberts Stadium
- Full name: Myslik Field at Roberts Stadium
- Address: Princeton, NJ; United States
- Coordinates: 40.34604674290051°N 74.6460550154803°W
- Owner: Princeton University
- Operator: Princeton University Athletics
- Capacity: 2,356
- Surface: Grass
- Field size: 110 x 68 m
- Current use: Soccer

Construction
- Groundbreaking: May, 2007
- Opened: September 2, 2008; 18 years ago
- Reopened: October 2, 2022
- Demolished: 2019
- Rebuilt: 2022
- Cost: $8.4 million
- Architect: Anderson Architects
- General contractors: Fitzpatrick & Associates, Inc

Tenants
- Princeton Tigers (NCAA) teams: men's and women's soccer (2008-present)

Website
- goprincetontigers.com/roberts-stadium

Roberts Stadium is a rebuilt 2,356 seat soccer-specific stadium located on the campus of Princeton University in Princeton, New Jersey. It is the home to the Princeton Tigers men's and women's soccer teams.

The stadium is named in honor of Thomas S. Roberts '85, a former Princeton record-holding goalkeeper and lead donor to its construction. The stadium's natural grass game field, "Myslik Field", is named in memory of Robert H. Myslik '90, a soccer alumnus and assistant coach who died in 2003. The team's artificial turf practice field, "Plummer Field", was adjacent to the stadium.

== History ==
The original Roberts Stadium opened September 2, 2008, and was formally dedicated October 4, 2008, following a doubleheader with Dartmouth College. The stadium replaced the former Lourie-Love Field, which stood on the same grounds. Lourie-Love Field was named after Princeton football alumni Donold B. Lourie and George H. Love, both 1922 graduates.

In May 2010, the United States men's national soccer team held a week-long pre-World Cup training camp at Roberts Stadium. In June 2012, the United States women's national soccer team held a two-week-long training camp at the stadium to prepare for an international friendly against the Chinese women's national football team at Talen Energy Stadium in Chester, PA.

The previous stadium was torn down in 2019 to make way for Yeh College, the seventh residential college at Princeton University. The current iteration of Roberts Stadium was built adjacent to Finney-Campbell Fields, Princeton Softball Stadium at Strubing Field, and the Stadium Drive Garage.

The new Roberts Stadium opened on October 2, 2022 with the Princeton Tigers women's soccer team defeating Dartmouth College 2–0. While similar to the previous Roberts Stadium, this iteration has notable upgrades that include seating that surrounds all four sides of Myslik Field with a grass berm behind one goal for fans to lounge on and dedicated men's and women's locker rooms with entrances that open up to midfield.
