= Dartmouth Big Green women's soccer =

American college soccer team

- University: Dartmouth College
- Head coach: Taylor Schram
- Nickname: Big Green
- Colors: Dartmouth green and white

NCAA tournament Quarterfinals
- 1998

NCAA tournament Round of 16
- 1998, 2000, 2001

NCAA tournament Round of 32
- 1998, 1999, 2000, 2001

NCAA tournament appearances
- 1993, 1994, 1996, 1998, 1999, 2000, 2001, 2002, 2003, 2005, 2025

Conference tournament championships
- 2025

The Dartmouth Big Green women's soccer team represents Dartmouth College in NCAA Division I college soccer. The Big Green are led by head coach Taylor Schram.

== History ==
Dartmouth has been to the NCAA tournament in 1993, 1994, 1996, 1998, 1999, 2000, 2001, 2002, 2003, 2005, and 2025.

In 1998, Dartmouth earned a first-round bye to the Round of 32, defeated Wisconsin 1-0 in the Round of 32, defeated Georgia 2-1 in the Sweet 16, and lost to North Carolina in the Elite 8.

In 1999, the Big Green defeated Colgate in the NCAA first round. In the Round of 32, they lost to UConn 3-0.

In 2000, Dartmouth received a first-round bye to the Round of 32. In the Round of 32, they defeated Boston University. In the Sweet 16, they lost to Penn State 4-0.

In 2001, the Big Green beat Wisconsin-Milwaukee 1-0 in 2OT in the NCAA first round. In the Round of 32, they defeated Michigan 1-0. In the Sweet 16, they lost to Santa Clara 2-0.

2002, 2003, and 2005 NCAA tournament appearances were all first-round exits.

In 2025, Dartmouth won its first Ivy League Tournament championship title and clinched its first NCAA tournament appearance since 2005 with a 1-0 win over Princeton. The Big Green lost to Arkansas 1-0 in the 2025 NCAA Division I women's soccer tournament first round.

== Current squad ==
As of November 2026

Note: Flags indicate national team as defined under FIFA eligibility rules; some limited exceptions apply. Players may hold more than one non-FIFA nationality.

No.	Pos.	Nation	Player
0	GK	USA	Mary Katherine Daly
3	DF	USA	Blake Fox
4	MF	USA	Lourdes Lauterborn
5	DF	USA	Emma Loparco
6	DF	USA	Anna Leschly
7	FW	USA	Abby Reger
8	DF	USA	Kate Ryan
10	MF	SWE	Lykke Ihrfelt
11	FW	USA	Madison Rose
12	FW	USA	Maeve Theobald
13	MF	USA	Nadia Young
14	MF	USA	Frankie Valverde
15	FW	USA	Stephanie Lathrop
17	FW	USA	Lily Morse

No.	Pos.	Nation	Player
18	MF	USA	Sarah Shelburne
19	FW	GHA	Emmanuella Frimpomaa
20	FW	ENG	Tasha Udebhulu
21	DF	SWE	Klara Schotte
22	MF	ENG	Gaby Dimmock
23	FW	USA	Michal Cagungun
24	MF	USA	Harper Hudepohl
26	DF	USA	Ellie Davidson
27	MF	USA	Anna Gominiak
28	MF	USA	Madyson Yu
29	MF	USA	Addison Ball
30	GK	USA	Ola Goebel
33	GK	USA	Paige Knoth
35	GK	USA	Catalina Gomez-Velez
