= Harvard Crimson women's soccer =

Ivy league varsity program

- Founded: 1977; 49 years ago
- University: Harvard University
- Location: Boston, Massachusetts, US
- Stadium: Jordan Field
- Nickname: Crimson
- Colors: Crimson, white, and black
Home	Away

NCAA tournament Quarterfinals
- 1982, 1997, 2000

NCAA tournament Round of 16
- 1982, 1984, 1997, 1998, 1999, 2000, 2001, 2014, 2022, 2023

NCAA tournament appearances
- 1982, 1984, 1996, 1997, 1998, 1999, 2000, 2001, 2004, 2008, 2009, 2011, 2013, 2014, 2016, 2021, 2022, 2024

Conference tournament championships
- 2023

Conference regular season championships
- 1978, 1979, 1981, 1995, 1996, 1997, 1999, 2008, 2009, 2011, 2013, 2014, 2016

Starting in the 1977 season, the Women's Soccer team was elevated from a club level to a varsity sport at Harvard. Bob Scalise, Harvard's former athletic director, became the first head coach in program history and led Harvard to a 106–34–14 record during his ten seasons. This included three Ivy titles and one tournament quarterfinal appearance. His last season as coach was in 1986.

Following Bob Scalise's retirement, Tim Wheaton took over the Crimson for 18 seasons, recording a 156–95–45 record. During those 18 seasons, he led Harvard to four Ivy League titles, seven NCAA appearances, and reached the quarterfinals twice.

Harvard then went through two coaches who each served for one year. In 2005, Stephanie Erickson led the Crimson to an 8–5–3 record, and the following year, Erika Walsh went 3–13–1.

In 2007, Ray Leone took over the Crimson and went 90–49–18 before accepting a job at Maryland in 2016.

The current head coach is Chris Hamblin, who started in 2016 and has gone 81–36–17. He has led Harvard to one Ivy League Championship and four NCAA appearances, including reaching the Round of 16 twice. He also won the first Ivy League Conference Tournament in 2023 by defeating Columbia 3–0.

== Roster ==
As of November 2026

Note: Flags indicate national team as defined under FIFA eligibility rules; some limited exceptions apply. Players may hold more than one non-FIFA nationality.

No.	Pos.	Nation	Player
0	GK	USA	Fio Eddy
00	GK	USA	Sophie Fleishman
1	GK	CAN	Olivia Busby
3	DF	USA	Danicka Miller
4	DF	AUS	Erin Gordon
5	DF	ENG	Phoebe Chadwick
6	DF	ESP	Claire Kessenger
7	MF	ESP	Elsa Santos López
9	FW	ISL	Ólöf Kristinsdóttir
10	FW	USA	Brooke Huleatt
11	FW	USA	Sarah Lloyd
12	MF	USA	Lou Ruffien

No.	Pos.	Nation	Player
13	MF	USA	Susie Long
14	MF	ISL	Írena Héðinsdóttir Gonzalez
15	MF	ESP	Camila Reinaldo
16	DF	USA	Jasmine Leshnick
18	DF	GER	Amy König
19	FW	USA	Anna Rayhill
20	MF	USA	Anya Van Den Einde
21	FW	USA	Molly Vana
22	FW	USA	Lauren Muniz
23	FW	CAN	Kennedy Belfon
30	GK	USA	Nicole Bidun
47	MF	USA	Hannah Eftekhari

== Rivalries ==
Harvard athletics have a longstanding rivalry with Yale across all sports since 1875, and it also translates to the women's soccer programs.

The first game of the series was played on November 11, 1977, where Harvard beat Yale 2–0. Harvard went on to win 13 in a row until 1990. Harvard is currently 36–9–2 in the 46 meetings hosting the longest win streak at 13 and currently on a 6-game win streak dating back to 2018.

== Team honors ==
=== Conference championships ===
Harvard has won 13 Ivy League championships.The Ivy League began sponsoring women's varsity soccer in 1977. Prior to 1977, Harvard competed as a club team.

Season	Conference	Coach	Overall Record	Conference Record
1978	Ivy	Bob Scalise	13–1–0	0–0–0
1979	Ivy	Bob Scalise	15–1–1	0–0–0
1981	Ivy	Bob Scalise	17–2–0	0–0–0
1995	Ivy	Tim Wheaton	14–2–1	6–0–1
1996	Ivy	Tim Wheaton	15–2–0	7–0–0
1997	Ivy	Tim Wheaton	13–4–2	6–1–0
1999	Ivy	Tim Wheaton	14–2–1	7–0–0
2008	Ivy	Ray Leone	10–3–5	5–1–1
2009	Ivy	Ray Leone	9–7–1	6–1–0
2011	Ivy	Ray Leone	12–5–1	6–0–1
2013	Ivy	Ray Leone	12–4–2	7–0–0
2014	Ivy	Ray Leone	11–5–2	5–1–1
2016	Ivy	Chris Hamblin	10–4–3	5–0–2

== Individual honors ==
=== First Team All-Americans ===
Harvard Women's Soccer have had 6 First Team All-Americans and 28 All-Americans (1st, 2nd, 3rd and honorable mention)

Player	Position	Year
Lauren Gregg	–	1980
Emily Stauffer	M	1995, 1996
Naomi Miller	FW	1996
Margaret Purce	FW	2016
Hannah Bebar	MF	2022
Josefine Hasbo	MF	2023

=== Second Team All-Americans ===
Harvard has fielded six second-team All-Americans.

Player	Position	Year
Alicia Carillo	FW	1982
Jennifer Greeley	MF	1982
Kelly Landry	FW	1983, 1984
Tracee Whitley	GK	1987
Emily Stauffer	MF	1998
Jade Rose	MF	2022

=== Third Team All-Americans ===
Harvard has fielded nine third-team All-Americans.

Player	Position	Year
Tracee Whitley	GK	1984, 1985
Ann Browning	GK	1996
Karen Gudeman	FW	1996
Devon Bingham	MF	1996
Katie Westfall	MF	2001
Liza Barber	DF	2004
Margaret Purce	FW	2013
Hannah Bebar	FW	2022
Jade Rose	DF	2023

== Notable alumni ==
- (Iceland) María Björg Ágústsdóttir (2005)
- (England) Lizzie Durack (2013–2016)
- (United States) Midge Purce (2013–2016)
- (United States) Sophie Hirst (2018–2022)
- (United States) Hannah Bebar (2021–2023)
- (Denmark) Josefine Hasbo (2021–2025)
- (Canada) Jade Rose (2021–2025)

== See also ==
- Harvard Crimson
