= List of Dallas Trinity FC players =

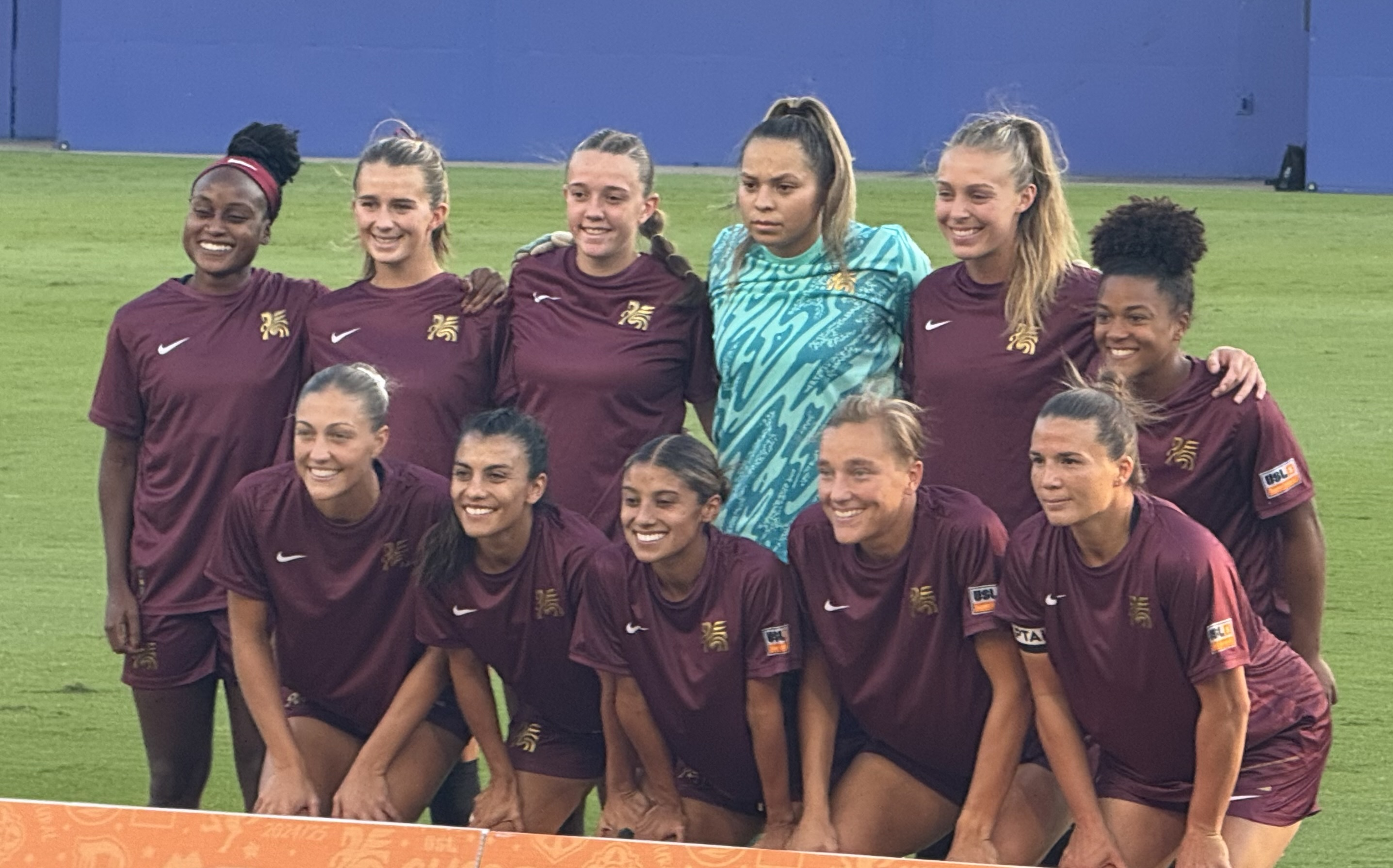
Dallas Trinity lineup, inaugural match: Ubogagu, Dorsey, Hardeman, Estrada, Thornton, Broussard Davison, Guillén, Meza, Danielsson, Brooks

Dallas Trinity FC is an American professional women's soccer club which began play in the inaugural season of the USL Super League. All players who have made a competitive appearance for Dallas Trinity FC are listed below.

== Key ==
- The list is ordered alphabetically.
- Appearances as a substitute are included.
- Statistics are correct as of May 30, 2026, the end of the 2025–26 USL Super League season, and are updated once a year after the conclusion of the USL Super League season.
- Players whose names are highlighted in **bold** were active players on the Trinity roster as of the list's most recent update.

Positions key
GK	Goalkeeper
DF	Defender
MF	Midfielder
FW	Forward

Nationality
Unless otherwise noted, the nationality of a player is determined by the country they most recently represented in international play, or if said player has not played international football then by their country of birth.
Position
Playing positions are listed according to the player's roster designation as of the list's most recent update.
Years
Years are defined as the first and last calendar years in which the player was rostered for the club in any of the competitions listed below.
Appearances and goals
This list counts appearances and goals in the USL Super League and USL Super League playoffs.

== Players ==
Yrs	No.	Pos	Nat	Player	Total		USL Super League		Playoffs	
Yrs	No.	Pos	Nat	Player	Apps	Goals	Apps	Goals	Apps	Goals
2025	6	MF	(Nigeria) NGA	Deborah Abiodun	14	0	13	0	1	0
2025–	24	MF	(Canada) CAN	Wayny Balata	22	2	22	2	0	0
2024–2025	23	MF	(United States) USA	Haley Berg	3	0	3	0	0	0
2025	16	FW	(Brazil) BRA	Tamara Bolt	27	1	26	1	1	0
2026–	88	FW	(United States) USA	Bethany Bos	15	3	14	3	1	0
2024–2026	17	MF	(United States) USA	Gracie Brian	38	5	37	5	1	0
2024–2025	7	FW	(United States) USA	Enzi Broussard	7	0	7	0	0	0
2026–	16	DF	(United States) USA	Sydney Cheesman	9	0	8	0	1	0
2024–	8	MF	(Finland) FIN	Jenny Danielsson	26	2	25	2	1	0
2024–	2	DF	(United States) USA	Hannah Davison (Note: First goal scorer in Trinity's history)	47	3	45	2	2	1
2024–2025	5	DF	(United States) USA	Julia Dorsey	27	0	26	0	1	0
2025–	3	DF	(United States) USA	Kiley Dulaney	17	0	16	0	1	0
2024–	0	GK	(United States) USA	Samantha Estrada (Note: Trinity's first starting goalkeeper in inaugural match)	5	0	5	0	0	0
2026–	5	DF	(United States) USA	Lauren Flynn	9	2	9	2	0	0
2025	1	GK	(Canada) CAN	Rylee Foster	12	0	12	0	0	0
2024	21	MF	(United States) USA	Kamdyn Fuller	3	0	3	0	0	0
2025–	18	DF	(United States) USA	Samar Guidry	26	1	25	1	1	0
2024–2025	3	MF	(Costa Rica) CRC	Gabriela Guillen	7	0	7	0	0	0
2026–	17	FW	(United States) USA	Jasmine Hamid	8	0	7	0	1	0
2024	24	DF	(United States) USA	Jordyn Hardeman	5	0	5	0	0	0
2024–2025	18	DF	(Sweden) SWE	Maja Henriksson	2	0	2	0	0	0
2024–	13	DF	(United States) USA	Cyera Hintzen	55	2	53	2	2	0
2024	6	DF	(United States) USA	Waniya Hudson	9	0	9	0	0	0
2025–	4	FW	(United States) USA	Caroline Kelly	14	0	14	0	0	0
2024–	21	MF	(United States) USA	Camryn Lancaster	41	6	39	6	2	0
2025–	25	DF	(United States) USA	Lauren Lapomarda	1	0	0	0	1	0
2026–	26	GK	(United States) USA	Tyler McCamey	16	0	15	0	1	0
2025–	11	DF	(United States) USA	Maya McCutcheon	26	1	25	1	1	0
2024	15	MF	(United States) USA	Sam Meza (Note: Scored first club home goal)	12	2	12	2	0	0
2025–	10	MF	(United States) USA	Lexi Missimo	24	4	23	4	1	0
2025	7	FW	(United States) USA	Rhea Moore	9	2	9	2	0	0
2024–2025	33	MF	(United States) USA	Rachel Pace	6	0	6	0	0	0
2025	11	DF	(Mexico) MEX	Athalie Palomo	5	0	5	0	0	0
2024–2025	15	DF	(Uganda) UGA	Shadia Nankya	2	0	2	0	0	0
2024–2025	9	FW	(England) ENG	Lucy Shepherd	22	1	21	1	1	0
2026–	6	MF	(United States) USA	Heather Stainbrook	11	2	11	2	0	0
2024–	12	MF	(United States) USA	Sealey Strawn (Note: Voted USL Super League Young Player of the Year)	45	9	44	9	1	0
2025–2026	52	MF	(United States) USA	Caroline Swann	12	0	12	0	0	0
2024–	20	FW	(United States) USA	Allie Thornton (Note: Golden boot winner: 2024-25 season; first player in club and league history to score a hat trick and first to score a perfect hat trick)	55	17	53	17	2	0
2024–	14	FW	(England) ENG	Chioma Ubogagu (Note: First Trinity player with a brace, first Trinity player credited with assist)	53	6	52	6	1	0
2024–2025	25	FW	(United States) USA	Natalie Wagner	6	0	6	0	0	0
2024–2025	19	DF	(United States) USA	Jenna Walker	25	0	24	0	1	0
2024–2025	1	GK	(United States) USA	Madison White (Note: First clean sheet in club history)	26	0	25	0	1	0
2024–2026	22	MF	(United States) USA	Amber Wisner (Note: First club signing and first club captain)	58	6	56	6	2	0

== By nationality ==
In total, 44 players representing 10 different countries have appeared for Dallas Trinity FC.

Note: Countries indicate national team as defined under FIFA eligibility rules. Players may hold more than one non-FIFA nationality.

Country	Total players
Brazil	1
Canada	2
Costa Rica	1
England	2
Finland	1
Mexico	1
Nigeria	1
Sweden	1
Uganda	1
United States	33

== See also ==
- List of top-division football clubs in CONCACAF countries
- List of professional sports teams in the United States and Canada
