= 2024–25 Dallas Trinity FC season =

Inaugural Dallas Trinity season

Dallas Trinity FC
2024-25 season
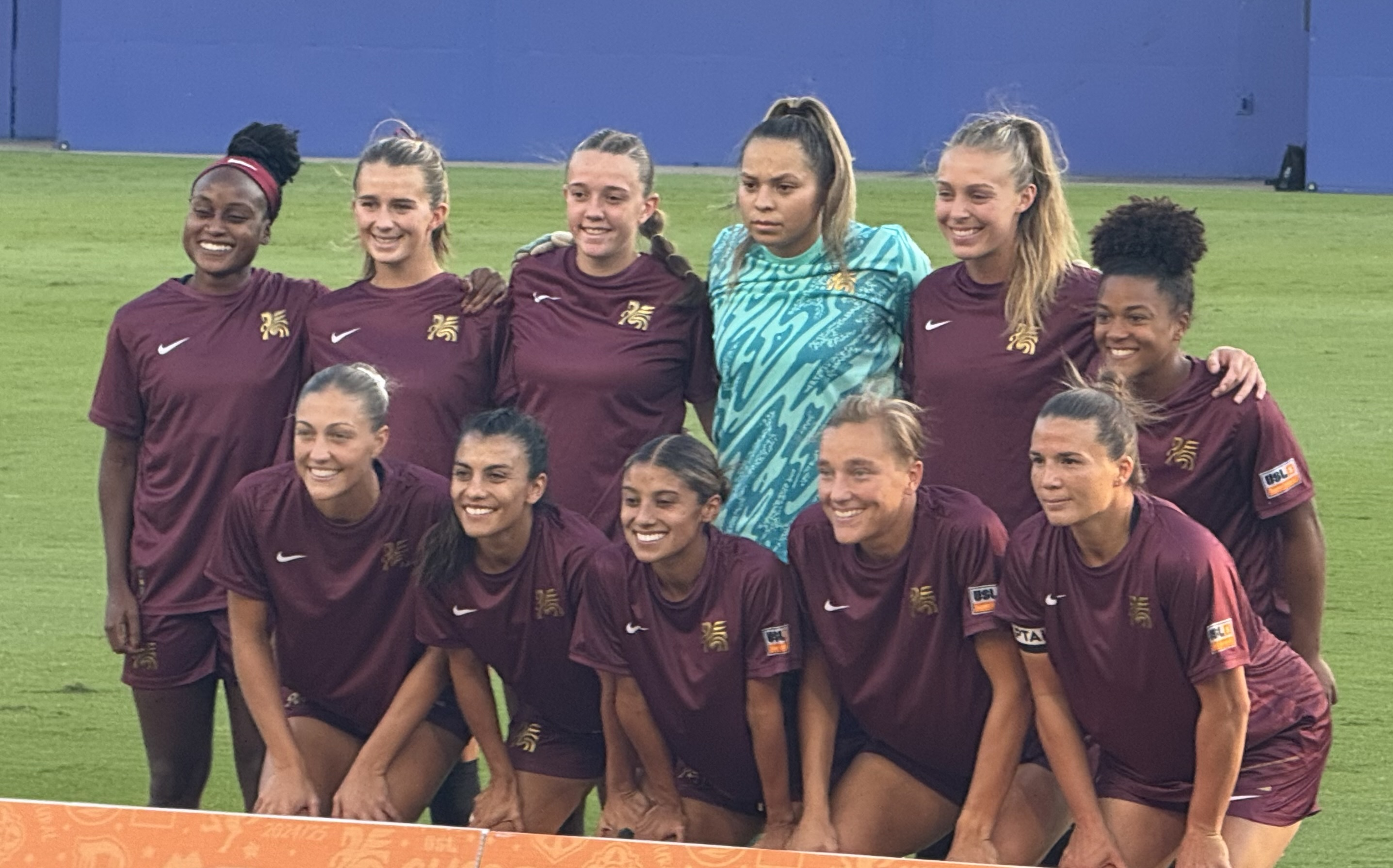
- Head coach: Chris Petrucelli (from 18 August-13 September); Pauline MacDonald (from 14 September-present)
- Stadium: Cotton Bowl, Dallas, Texas, US
- USL Super League: 3rd
- USLS Playoffs: Semi-finals
- Copa Tejas Shield: 1st
- Top goalscorer: Allie Thornton (13 goals)
- Highest home attendance: 5,884 (v CAR) (31 May 2025)
- Lowest home attendance: 1,662 (v Spokane) (22 February 2025)
- Average home league attendance: 3,546
- Biggest win: 6–0 (vs Brooklyn (H), March 9, 2025)
- Biggest defeat: 0–3 (vs Carolina Ascent (A), March 29, 2025); 0–3 (vs Spokane Zephyr (A), April 12, 2025)
Home colors	Away colors
- All statistics correct as of 31 May 2025.

The 2024–25 season of Dallas Trinity FC was the team's inaugural season as a professional women's soccer team and as well as the first for the USL Super League (USLS), one of two leagues to be in the top tier of women's soccer in the United States. In November 2024, Copa Tejas announced that as a Division I team Dallas Trinity FC would be included in the Copa Tejas Shield beginning in 2025. Because of the USL Super League fall to spring schedule, the entire 2024-25 season standings was used for the 2025 Shield.

== Background ==
On May 16, 2023, it was announced by the USL that Dallas was selected as one of eight markets to gain a team. It was later confirmed that the United States Soccer Federation would officially sanction the league as Division 1, giving Dallas its first professional women's soccer team.

In May 2024, the club announced that it would play their home games at the Cotton Bowl with the home season opener scheduled for September 7, 2024 against DC Power FC.

Adding to the excitement, Dallas brought in several players who are either from the DFW Metroplex or played college soccer in the Metroplex including: Hailey Davidson, Haley Berg, Allie Thornton, Gracie Brian, Cyera Hintzen, Enzi Broussard, Chioma Ubogagu, Madison White, Jenna Winebrenner, Samantha Meza and Samantha Estrada.

On July 26, 2024, the club announced they would play a friendly against FC Barcelona Femini as part of the team's US Tour on August 30, 2024.

== Players and staff ==
=== Current squad ===
As of April 8, 2025 Note: Flags indicate national team as defined under FIFA eligibility rules; some limited exceptions apply. Players may hold more than one non-FIFA nationality.

No.	Pos.	Nation	Player
0	GK	USA	Samantha Estrada
1	GK	USA	Madison White (on loan from Racing Louisville FC)
2	DF	USA	Hannah Davison
3	DF	CRC	Gabriela Guillen
4	DF	USA	Maya Gordon
5	DF	USA	Julia Dorsey
6	MF	NGR	Deborah Abiodun (on loan from Washington Spirit)
7	FW	USA	Enzi Broussard
8	MF	FIN	Jenny Danielsson
9	FW	ENG	Lucy Shepherd
10	FW	USA	Lexi Missimo
11	DF	MEX	Athalie Palomo

No.	Pos.	Nation	Player
13	FW	USA	Cyera Hintzen
14	FW	ENG	Chioma Ubogagu
15	DF	UGA	Shadia Nankya (on loan from Washington Spirit)
16	FW	BRA	Tamara Bolt (on loan from Washington Spirit)
17	MF	USA	Gracie Brian
18	DF	SWE	Maja Henriksson
19	DF	USA	Jenna Walker
20	FW	USA	Allie Thornton
21	FW	USA	Camryn Lancaster
22	MF	USA	Amber Brooks (captain)
23	MF	USA	Haley Berg
33	MF	USA	Rachel Pace

=== Academy players ===
Note: Flags indicate national team as defined under FIFA eligibility rules; some limited exceptions apply. Players may hold more than one non-FIFA nationality.

No.	Pos.	Nation	Player
12	FW	USA	Sealey Strawn
25	FW	USA	Natalie Wagner
27	GK	USA	Evan O'Steen

=== Staff ===
As of September 9, 2024*

Front office
Position	Name
Owner	(United States) Neil Family
President	(United States) Charlie Neil
General Manager	(United States) Chris Petrucelli
Technical staff
General Manager	(United States) Chris Petrucelli
Head Coach	(Scotland) Pauline MacDonald
Assistant Coach	Gavin Beith
Head of Soccer Operations	Becky Maines
Goalkeeper Coach	Giovanni Solis
3rd Assistant/Analyst	Nick Petrucelli
Performance Coach	Jonathan Corbett

== Transfers ==
As of April 8, 2025*

=== In ===
Player	Previous Team	Date	Ref.
(United States) Amber Brooks	(United States) Washington Spirit	May 31, 2024	
(United States) Hailey Davidson	(New Zealand) Wellington Phoenix FC	June 3, 2024	
(United States) Haley Berg	(Turkey) Fenerbahçe S.K.	June 5, 2024	
(United States) Allie Thornton	(Belgium) RSC Anderlecht	June 7, 2024	
(United States) Samantha Estrada	(United States) AHFC Royals	June 10, 2024	
(United States) Maya Gordon	(United States) Louisiana State University	June 12, 2024	
(United States) Rachel Pace	(Hungary) FC Győr	June 18, 2024	
(United States) Gracie Brian	(United States) Texas Christian University	June 21, 2024	
(Finland) Jenny Danielsson	(Sweden) Växjö DFF	June 24, 2024	
(United States) Hannah Davison	(Sweden) KIF Örebro DFF	June 26, 2024	
(Sweden) Maja Henriksson	(United States) Nova Southeastern University	June 28, 2024	
(England) Lucy Shepherd	(England) Blackburn Rovers	July 1, 2024	
(United States) Enzi Broussard	(South Korea) Changnyeong WFC	July 10, 2024	
(England) Chioma Ubogagu	(England) Tottenham Hotspur	July 15, 2024	
(Costa Rica) Gabriela Guillen	(Costa Rica) Alajuelense FF	July 24, 2024	
(United States) Jenna Winebrenner	(United States) North Carolina Courage	August 1, 2024	
(United States) Lexi Missimo	(United States) The University of Texas	January 29, 2025	
(United States) Camryn Lancaster	(United States) Texas Christian University	February 13, 2025	
(Mexico) Athalie Palomo	(Mexico) Tigres UANL	April 8, 2025	

=== Out ===
Player	Fee/Notes	Date	Ref.
Kiara Gilmore	Released	January 9, 2025	
Jordyn Hardeman	Released	January 9, 2025	
Olivia Belcher	Released	January 9, 2025	
Kamdyn Fuller	Released	January 9, 2025	
Hailey Davidson	Mutual Departure	January 29, 2025	N/A

=== Loan in ===
No.	Pos.	Player	Loaned from	Start	End	Source
1	GK	(United States) Madison White	(United States) Racing Louisville FC	July 23, 2024	June 30, 2025	
15	MF	(United States) Samantha Meza	(United States) Seattle Reign	August 1, 2024	December 31, 2024	
5	DF	(United States) Julia Dorsey	(United States) North Carolina Courage	August 9, 2024	December 31, 2024	
6	DF	(United States) Waniya Hudson	(United States) Washington Spirit	September 23, 2024	December 31, 2024	
6	MF	(Nigeria) Deborah Abiodun	(United States) Washington Spirit	February 7, 2025	December 31, 2025	
16	FW	(Brazil) Tamara Bolt	(United States) Washington Spirit	February 7, 2025	December 31, 2025	
16	FW	(Uganda) Shadia Nankya	(United States) Washington Spirit	March 8, 2025	December 31, 2025	

=== Loan out ===
No.	Pos.	Player	Loaned to	Start	End	Source
4	DF	(United States) Maya Gordon	(United States) Washington Spirit	July 27, 2024	August 10, 2024	
17	MF	(United States) Gracie Brian	(United States) Houston Dash	September 21, 2024	September 22, 2024	
3	DF	(Costa Rica) Gabriela Guillen	(United States) Houston Dash	September 21, 2024	September 22, 2024	

== Competitions ==
Win Draw Loss

=== Pre-season matches ===
July 31, 2024 1	SMU Mustangs	–	Dallas Trinity FC	University Park, Texas
				Stadium: Westcott Field
Note: Game played behind closed doors and results were not made publicly available

August 7, 2024 2	Dallas Trinity FC	–	Oklahoma Sooners	Dallas, Texas
				Stadium: Cotton Bowl
Note: Game played behind closed doors and results were not made publicly available

=== Friendlies ===
August 30, 2024 US Tour	Dallas Trinity FC (United States)	0–6	(Spain) Barcelona	Dallas, Texas
7:30 p.m. CST	Davidson (yellow card) 56'	Report	Pina 2', 45+2', 55'; Szymczak 13'; Guijarro 16'; Kika 31'	Stadium: Cotton Bowl; Attendance: 5,387

=== USL Super League ===
==== Regular season standings ====
Pos	Team	Pld	W	L	T	GF	GA	GD	Pts	Qualification
1	Carolina Ascent (S)	28	13	6	9	45	24	+21	48	Playoffs
2	Tampa Bay Sun (C)	28	12	6	10	42	28	+14	46	Playoffs
3	Dallas Trinity	28	12	9	7	42	30	+12	43	Playoffs
4	Fort Lauderdale United	28	11	8	9	35	33	+2	42 (Note: Head-to-head points: Fort Lauderdale 6, Spokane 3)	Playoffs
5	Spokane Zephyr	28	11	8	9	37	32	+5	42	

Source: USL Super League
Rules for classification: 1) head-to-head points; 2) total goal differential; 3) total goals scored; 4) disciplinary points; 5) drawing of lots.
(C) Champions; (S) Players' Shield winner

==== Results summary ====
Overall								Home						Away					
Pld	W	D	L	GF	GA	GD	Pts	W	D	L	GF	GA	GD	W	D	L	GF	GA	GD
28	12	7	9	42	30	+12	43	7	5	2	26	11	+15	5	2	7	16	19	−3

==== Regular season ====
The league fixtures were released on May 30, 2024.

Win Draw Loss Fixtures

August 18, 2024 1	Tampa Bay Sun FC	1–1	Dallas Trinity FC	Tampa, Florida
6:30 p.m. EST	Hendrix (yellow card) 44', (goal) 70'; Edmonds (yellow card) 47'	Report	Guillen (yellow card) 18'; Davison 45+7', (yellow card) 86'	Stadium: Riverfront Stadium; Attendance: 5,248; Referee: Shawn Tehini

September 7, 2024 2	Dallas Trinity FC	1–1	DC Power FC	Dallas, Texas
7:00 p.m. CST	Meza 65'	Report	Baucom 29', (yellow card) 78'; Guillou (yellow card) 38'; Murnin (yellow card) 45+2'	Stadium: Cotton Bowl; Attendance: 5,835; Referee: Iryna Petrunok

September 13, 2024 3	Dallas Trinity FC	6–2	Lexington SC	Dallas, Texas
7:00 p.m. CST	Hintzen (yellow card) 17'; Thornton 33', 78', 90+4'; Brooks 45+2'; Ubogagu 56', 67'	Report	Utley 7'; Richardson (yellow card) 32'; Parsons 52'	Stadium: Cotton Bowl; Attendance: 2,961; Referee: Jaclyn Metz

September 25, 2024 4	Brooklyn FC	2–0	Dallas Trinity FC	New York, New York
7:00 p.m. EST	Garziano 20'; George 38'; Breslin (penalty missed) 55'	Report	Brooks (yellow card) 58'	Stadium: Commisso Soccer Stadium; Attendance: 951; Referee: Marie Durr
Note: Match originally scheduled to be played at Maimonides Park but moved due to playing field issues.

October 6, 2024 6	Spokane Zephyr FC	1–2	Dallas Trinity FC	Spokane, Washington
2:00 p.m. PST	Braun (yellow card) 40'; Aylmer (yellow card) 62', (goal) 73'; bench (yellow card) 90+6'	Report	Davison 36'; Guillen (yellow card) 41'; Brian 58'	Stadium: One Spokane Stadium; Attendance: 2,554; Referee: Laura Rodriguez

October 16, 2024 7	DC Power FC	0–0	Dallas Trinity FC	Washington, D.C.
7:30 p.m. EST	Constant (yellow card) 47'	Report	Ubogagu (yellow card) 85'	Stadium: Audi Field; Attendance: 2,513; Referee: Alexandra Billeter

October 25, 2024 8	Dallas Trinity FC	2–2	Carolina Ascent FC	Dallas, Texas
7:00 p.m. CST	Brooks 24'; Winebrenner (yellow card) 35'; Thornton 45+3'	Report	Corbin 8'; Bedoya 31'	Stadium: Cotton Bowl; Attendance: 3,446; Referee: Melinda Sopka Homa

November 2, 2024 9	Dallas Trinity FC	1–0	Fort Lauderdale United FC	Dallas, Texas
4:00 p.m. CST	Brooks (yellow card) 45+3'; Meza (yellow card) 83'; Strawn 87'	Report	Hamid (yellow card) 79'; Gomes (yellow card) 90+1'	Stadium: Cotton Bowl; Attendance: 3,130; Referee: Natalie Simon

November 9, 2024 10	Lexington SC	2–3	Dallas Trinity FC	Lexington, Kentucky
6:00 p.m. CST	Parsons 14'; Weeks (yellow card) 37'; Moyer 51' (pen.)	Report	Brooks (yellow card) 35'; Hintzen 81'; Davison (yellow card) 86'; Danielsson 89'; Brian 90'	Stadium: Lexington SC Stadium; Attendance: 1,868; Referee: Calin Radosav

November 20, 2024 11	Dallas Trinity FC	0–0	Spokane Zephyr FC	Dallas, Texas
7:00 p.m. CST	Brian (yellow card) 21'; Dorsey (yellow card) 34'	Report		Stadium: Cotton Bowl; Attendance: 2,390; Referee: Trevor Wiseman

November 23, 2024 12	Carolina Ascent FC	0–1	Dallas Trinity FC	Charlotte, North Carolina
7:00 p.m. EST	Porter (yellow card) 14'; Bruce (yellow card) 59'	Report	Meza 3'; Broussard (yellow card) 85'	Stadium: American Legion Memorial Stadium; Attendance: 4,953; Referee: Shawn Tehini

December 1, 2024 5	Fort Lauderdale United FC	2–1	Dallas Trinity FC	Davie, Florida
7:30 p.m. EST	Hamid 2' (yellow card) 62'; Fung (yellow card) 49'; McCain 81'	Report	Brooks (yellow card) 58'; Thornton 68'	Stadium: FTL UTD Stadium; Attendance: 1,957; Referee: Elton Garcia
Note: Match was originally scheduled for September 29, 2024 but was postponed due to construction issues at FTL UTD Stadium

December 8, 2024 13	Dallas Trinity FC	2–0	Tampa Bay Sun FC	Dallas, Texas
2:30 p.m. CST	Giammona 66' (o.g.); Thornton 68'	Report	Hendrix (yellow card) 65'; Nasello (yellow card) 90+2'	Stadium: Cotton Bowl; Attendance: 2,260; Referee: Calin Radosav

December 14, 2024 14	Dallas Trinity FC	0–1	Brooklyn FC	Dallas, Texas
2:30 p.m. CST	Hardeman (yellow card) 54'	Report	Cox 77'; Breslin (yellow card) 90'	Stadium: Cotton Bowl; Attendance: 3,467; Referee: Gerald Flores

February 15, 2025 15	Dallas Trinity FC	1–1	Tampa Bay Sun FC	Dallas, Texas
2:30 p.m. CST	Missimo 4'; Davison (yellow card) 33'; Brian (yellow card) 50'	Report	Goins 50'; Giammona (yellow card) 76'; Bessette (yellow card) 90+1'	Stadium: Cotton Bowl; Attendance: 3,183; Referee: Iryna Petrunok

February 22, 2025 16	Dallas Trinity FC	0–1	Spokane Zephyr FC	Dallas, Texas
4:00 p.m. CST	Walker (yellow card) 25'; Ubogagu (yellow card) 52'	Report	Murray 15'; Viggiano (yellow card) 72'; Vallerand (yellow card) 80'; Cook (yellow card) 90'	Stadium: Cotton Bowl; Attendance: 1,662; Referee: Corbyn May

March 9, 2025 17	Dallas Trinity FC	6–0	Brooklyn FC	Dallas, Texas
4:00 p.m. CST	Ubogagu 6'; Abiodun (yellow card) 36'; Lancaster 45+2'; Thornton 68', 70'; Missimo 79'; Shepherd 88'	Report	Pantuso (yellow card) 52'; Scarpelli (yellow card) 56'	Stadium: Cotton Bowl; Attendance: 4,875; Referee: Jaclyn Metz

March 19, 2025 19	Brooklyn FC	0–3	Dallas Trinity FC	New York, New York
6:30 p.m. CST	Pickard (yellow card) 38'; George (yellow card) 61'; Purcell (yellow card) 90+1'	Report	Lancaster 6'; Thornton 19' (yellow card) 55'; Brooks (yellow card) 31'; Strawn 58'; Brian (yellow card) 80'	Stadium: Maimonides Park; Attendance: 963; Referee: Katherine McCormick

March 29, 2025 20	Carolina Ascent FC	3–0	Dallas Trinity FC	Charlotte, North Carolina
6:00 p.m. CST	Hutchinson 19'; Corbin 24' 54' (pen.); Studer (yellow card) 57'	Report		Stadium: American Legion Memorial Stadium; Attendance: 3,045

April 2, 2025 21	Dallas Trinity FC	1–0	DC Power FC	Dallas, Texas
7:00 p.m. CST	Ubogagu 23'; Davison (yellow card) 62'	Report		Stadium: Cotton Bowl; Attendance: 2,284; Referee: Alyssa Nichols

April 6, 2025 18	Lexington SC	0–3	Dallas Trinity FC	Lexington, Kentucky
1:00 p.m. CST		Report	Brooks 36' (pen.) (yellow card) 40'; Hintzen 63'; Wagner (yellow card) 71'; Brian 83'	Stadium: Lexington SC Stadium; Attendance: 476; Referee: Marie Durr
Note: Match was originally scheduled for March 15, 2024 but was postponed due to inclement weather.

April 12, 2025 22	Spokane Zephyr FC	3–0	Dallas Trinity FC	Spokane, Washington
8:00 p.m. CST	Cook 55'; Cummings 58'; Jaskaniec (yellow card) 71'; Murray 84'; Bourgeois (yellow card) 86'	Report		Stadium: One Spokane Stadium; Attendance: 2,013; Referee: Adorae Monroy

April 19, 2025 23	Dallas Trinity FC	1–1	Fort Lauderdale United FC	Dallas, Texas
4:00 p.m. CST	Thornton 3'; Abiodun (yellow card) 33'; Brooks (yellow card) 86'	Report	Locklear 35'; McCain (yellow card) 69'; McNeill (yellow card) 88'	Stadium: Cotton Bowl; Attendance: 3,536; Referee: Rachel Swett

April 26, 2025 24	Dallas Trinity FC	3–1	Lexington SC	Dallas, Texas
7:00 p.m. CST	Bolt 5'; Strawn 70'; Walker (yellow card) 84'; Thornton 90+3'	Report	Vernis (yellow card) 26'; Perez (yellow card) 50'; White 69'	Stadium: Cotton Bowl; Attendance: 4,753; Referee: Iryna Petrunok

May 4, 2025 25	Tampa Bay Sun FC	1–0	Dallas Trinity FC	Tampa, Florida
6:00 p.m. CST	Keane 13'; Listro (red card) 25'; Giammona (yellow card) 44'	Report	Hintzen (yellow card) 31'	Stadium: Riverfront Stadium; Attendance: 2,877; Referee: Alex Beehler
Note: Matched moved to May 4 due to inclement weather

May 8, 2025 26	DC Power FC	3–2	Dallas Trinity FC	Washington, D.C.
6:00 p.m. CST	Konte (yellow card) 31'; Geinore 54', 90+5'; Friedrichs 63'	Report	Strawn 26'; Thornton 33'; Davison (yellow card) 90+8'	Stadium: Audi Field; Attendance: 1,136; Referee: Kaitlyn Trowbridge

May 24, 2025 27	Fort Lauderdale United FC	1–0	Dallas Trinity FC	Davie, Florida
6:30 p.m. CST	Locklear 26' (yellow card) 28'; Cameron Brooks (yellow card) 71'	Report	Strawn (yellow card) 16'	Stadium: FTL UTD Stadium; Attendance: 2,554; Referee: Shawn Tehini

May 31, 2025 28	Dallas Trinity FC	2–1	Carolina Ascent FC	Dallas, Texas
7:00 p.m. CST	Thornton 20'; Brooks (yellow card) 23'; Ubogagu 54'	Report	Parker (yellow card) 80'; Murphy (yellow card) 81'; Bedoya 90+3'; Porter (yellow card) 90+5'	Stadium: Cotton Bowl; Attendance: 5,884; Referee: Jaclyn Metz

=== Playoffs ===
June 7, 2025 Semifinals	Tampa Bay Sun FC	2–1	Dallas Trinity FC	Tampa Bay
6:30 PM CST		Report		Stadium: Riverfront Stadium; Attendance: 5,884; Referee: Jaclyn Metz

== Squad statistics ==
As of final match played June 7, 2025

Players with no appearances are not included on the list, italics indicate a loaned in player

=== Appearances ===
No.	Player	Nat.	Total		USLS Regular Season		Playoffs		Other	
No.	Player	Nat.	Apps	Starts	Apps	Starts	Apps	Starts	Apps	Starts
Goalkeepers
0	Sam Estrada	(United States)	4	3	3	3	0	0	1	0
1	Madison White	(United States)	27	27	25	25	1	1	1	1
27	Evan O'Steen	(United States)	1	0	0	0	0	0	1	0
Defenders
2	Hannah Davison	(United States)	27	24	25	23	1	1	1	0
3	Gabriella Guillen	(Costa Rica)	8	6	7	6	0	0	1	0
4	Maya Gordon	(United States)	1	1	0	0	0	0	1	1
5	Julia Dorsey	(United States)	28	26	26	24	1	1	1	1
11	Athalie Palomo	(Mexico)	5	5	5	5	0	0	0	0
15	Shadia Nankya	(Uganda)	2	0	2	0	0	0	0	0
18	Maja Henriksson	(Sweden)	3	1	2	0	0	0	1	1
19	Jenna Walker	(United States)	26	26	24	24	1	1	1	1
Midfielders
6	Deborah Abiodun	(Nigeria)	12	7	12	7	0	0	0	0
8	Jenny Danielsson	(Finland)	18	10	17	10	0	0	1	0
10	Lexi Missimo	(United States)	5	5	5	5	0	0	0	0
14	Chioma Ubogagu	(England)	27	24	25	22	1	1	1	1
17	Gracie Brian	(United States)	28	19	26	18	1	1	1	0
21	Camryn Lancaster	(United States)	14	13	13	12	1	1	0	0
22	Amber Brooks (c)	(United States)	30	30	28	28	1	1	1	1
23	Haley Berg	(United States)	4	1	3	0	0	0	1	1
Forwards
7	Enzi Broussard	(United States)	8	2	7	2	0	0	1	0
9	Lucy Shepherd	(England)	19	5	17	5	1	1	1	0
12	Sealey Strawn	(United States)	20	9	19	8	0	0	1	1
13	Cyera Hintzen	(United States)	27	16	25	15	1	1	1	0
16	Tamara Bolt	(Brazil)	15	12	14	11	1	1	0	0
20	Allie Thornton	(United States)	29	28	27	26	1	1	1	1
25	Natalie Wagner	(United States)	6	0	5	0	1	0	0	0
33	Rachel Pace	(United States)	6	5	6	5	0	0	0	0
Other players (Departed during season)
6	Waniya Hudson	(United States)	9	9	9	9	0	0	0	0
11	Hailey Davidson	(United States)	1	0	0	0	0	0	1	0
15	Samantha Meza	(United States)	13	12	12	12	0	0	1	0
21	Kamdyn Fuller	(United States)	4	1	3	0	0	0	1	1
24	Jordyn Hardeman	(United States)	6	5	5	5	0	0	1	0

=== Goals ===
Rank	No.	Nat.	Name	USLS	Playoffs	Total
1	20	(United States)	Allie Thornton	13	0	13
2	14	(England)	Chioma Ubogagu	5	0	5
3	12	(United States)	Sealey Strawn	4	0	4
4	22	(United States)	Amber Brooks	3	0	3
4	17	(United States)	Gracie Brian	3	0	3
4	2	(United States)	Hannah Davison	2	1	3
7	21	(United States)	Camryn Lancaster	2	0	2
7	15	(United States)	Samantha Meza	2	0	2
7	10	(United States)	Lexi Missimo	2	0	2
7	13	(United States)	Cyera Hintzen	2	0	2
11	8	(Finland)	Jenny Danielsson	1	0	1
11	9	(England)	Lucy Shepherd	1	0	1
11	16	(Brazil)	Tamara Bolt	1	0	1
Own goals				1	0	1
Total				42	1	43

=== Assists ===
Rank	No.	Nat.	Name	USLS	Playoffs	Total
1	14	(England)	Chioma Ubogagu	6	0	6
2	9	(England)	Lucy Shepherd	3	0	3
2	20	(United States)	Allie Thornton	3	0	3
2	13	(United States)	Cyera Hintzen	3	0	3
5	22	(United States)	Amber Brooks	2	0	2
5	12	(United States)	Sealey Strawn	2	0	2
5	8	(Finland)	Jenny Danielsson	2	0	2
5	16	(Brazil)	Tamara Bolt	1	1	2
9	5	(United States)	Julia Dorsey	1	0	1
9	15	(United States)	Samantha Meza	1	0	1
9	10	(United States)	Lexi Missimo	1	0	1
9	21	(United States)	Camryn Lancaster	1	0	1
9	2	(United States)	Hannah Davison	1	0	1
Total				27	1	28

=== Shutouts ===
Rank	No.	Nat.	Name	USLS	Playoffs	Total
1	1	(United States)	Madison White	9	0	9
Total				9	0	9

=== Disciplinary record ===
Player				Regular Season			Playoffs			Other			Total		
Rank	No.	Nat.	Name	Yellow card	(yellow card) (yellow-red card)	Red card	Yellow card	(yellow card) (yellow-red card)	Red card	Yellow card	(yellow card) (yellow-red card)	Red card	Yellow card	(yellow card) (yellow-red card)	Red card
1	22	(United States)	Amber Brooks	8	0	0	1	0	0	0	0	0	9	0	0
2	2	(United States)	Hannah Davison	5	0	0	0	0	0	0	0	0	5	0	0
3	19	(United States)	Jenna Walker	3	0	0	0	0	0	0	0	0	3	0	0
4	17	(United States)	Gracie Brian	2	0	0	0	0	0	0	0	0	2	0	0
4	3	(Costa Rica)	Gabriela Guillen	2	0	0	0	0	0	0	0	0	2	0	0
4	14	(England)	Chioma Ubogagu	2	0	0	0	0	0	0	0	0	2	0	0
4	6	(Nigeria)	Deborah Abiodun	2	0	0	0	0	0	0	0	0	2	0	0
4	13	(United States)	Cyera Hintzen	2	0	0	0	0	0	0	0	0	2	0	0
9	7	(United States)	Enzi Broussard	1	0	0	0	0	0	0	0	0	1	0	0
9	11	(United States)	Hailey Davidson	0	0	0	0	0	0	1	0	0	1	0	0
9	5	(United States)	Julia Dorsey	1	0	0	0	0	0	0	0	0	1	0	0
9	24	(United States)	Jordyn Hardeman	1	0	0	0	0	0	0	0	0	1	0	0
9	15	(United States)	Samantha Meza	1	0	0	0	0	0	0	0	0	1	0	0
9	20	(United States)	Allie Thornton	1	0	0	0	0	0	0	0	0	1	0	0
9	25	(United States)	Natalie Wagner	1	0	0	0	0	0	0	0	0	1	0	0
9	12	(United States)	Sealey Strawn	1	0	0	0	0	0	0	0	0	1	0	0
Total				34	0	0	1	0	0	1	0	0	36	0	0

== Awards and honors ==
=== USL Super League Golden Boot ===
Player	Position	Stat	Ref
(United States) Allie Thornton	FW	13 goals	

=== USL Super League Young Player of the Year ===
Player	Position	Stat	Ref
(United States) Sealey Strawn	FW	19 matches, 4 goals, 2 assists	

=== USL Super League All League Team ===
Player	Position	Ref
(United States) Allie Thornton	FW	
(United States) Amber Brooks	MF	
(England) Chioma Ubogagu	FW	
(United States) Hannah Davison	DF	

=== USL Super League Player of the Month ===
Month	Player	Position	Ref
October 2024	(United States) Samantha Meza	MF	
May 2025	(United States) Allie Thornton	FW	
May 2025	(England) Chioma Ubogagu	MF	

=== USL Super League Save of the Month ===
Month	Player	Ref
September	(United States) Madison White	

=== USL Super League Team of the Month ===
Month	Player	Position	Ref
August	(England) Chioma Ubogagu	MF	
August	(United States) Allie Thornton	FW	
September	(England) Chioma Ubogagu (2)	MF	
September	(United States) Amber Brooks	MF	
September	(United States) Allie Thornton (2)	Bench	
October	(United States) Madison White	GK	
October	(United States) Hannah Davison	MF	
October	(Scotland) Pauline MacDonald	Coach	
November	(United States) Samantha Meza	MF	
November	(United States) Gracie Brian	FW	
November	(United States) Madison White (2)	Bench	
December	(United States) Jenna Winebrenner	MF	
December	(United States) Allie Thornton (3)	FW	
February	(United States) Amber Brooks (2)	MF	
February	(United States) Lexi Missimo	Bench	
March	(United States) Hannah Davison (2)	DF	
March	(United States) Camryn Lancaster	Bench	
April	(United States) Amber Brooks (3)	MF	
April	(Brazil) Tamara Bolt	FW	
April	(United States) Allie Thornton (4)	Bench	
