= Julia Dorsey (soccer) =

American soccer player (born 2000)

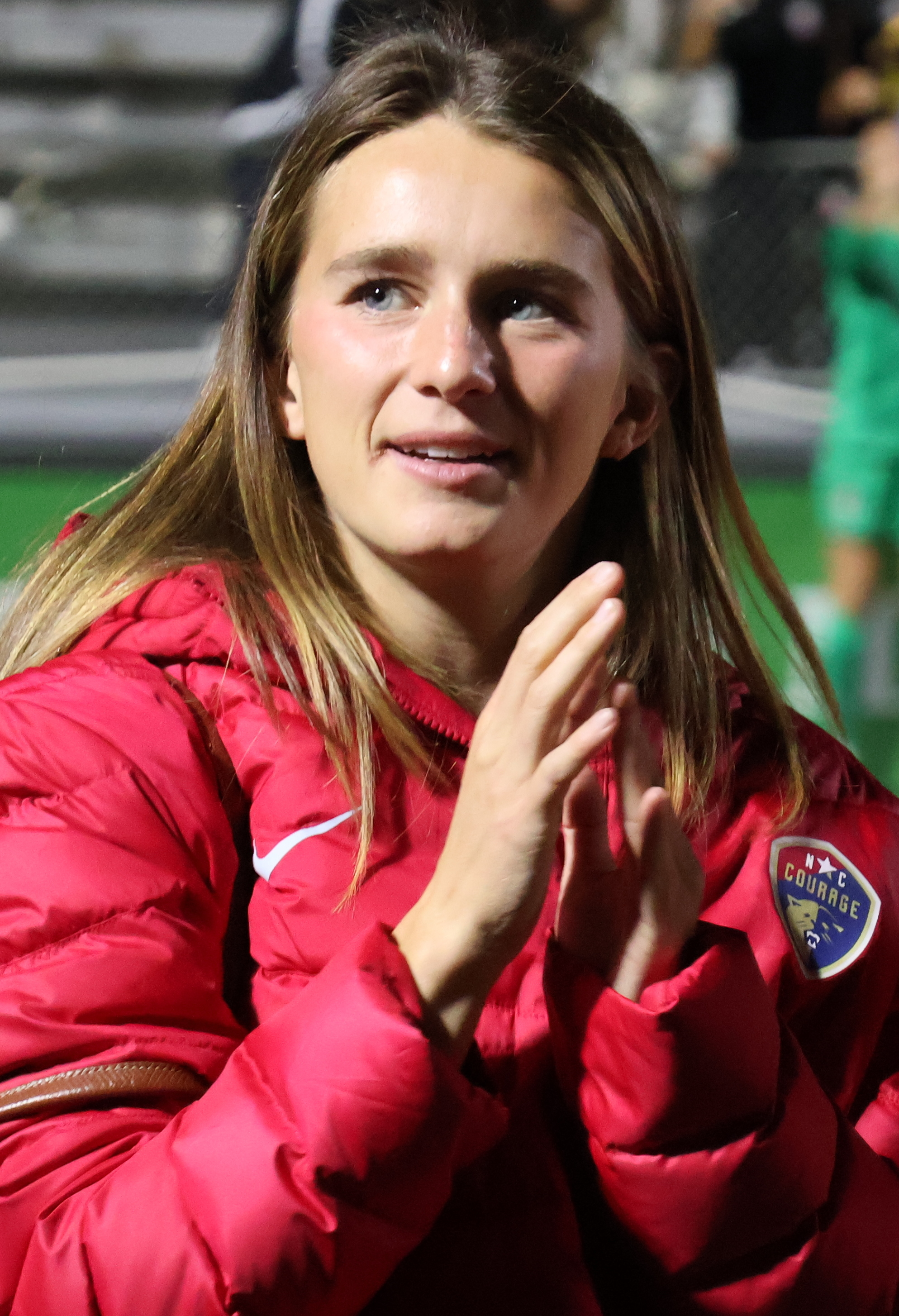
- Dorsey with the North Carolina Courage in 2024

Personal information
- Full name: Julia Carroll Dorsey
- Date of birth: August 8, 2000 (age 26)
- Place of birth: Baltimore, Maryland, U.S.
- Height: 5 ft 7 in (1.70 m)
- Positions: Right back; wingback

College career
| Years | Team | Apps | (Gls) |
| 2019–2023 | North Carolina Tar Heels | 69 | (2) |

Senior career*
| Years | Team | Apps | (Gls) |
| 2024 | North Carolina Courage | 0 | (0) |
| 2024 | → Dallas Trinity (loan) | 13 | (0) |
| 2025 | Dallas Trinity | 13 | (0) |

International career
| 2019 | United States U-20 | | |
- * Club domestic league appearances and goals

Julia Carroll Dorsey (born August 8, 2000) is an American former professional soccer player. Dorsey played both soccer and lacrosse at the University of North Carolina, winning the 2022 national championship with the lacrosse team. She was drafted by the North Carolina Courage in the third round of the 2024 NWSL Draft before playing for Dallas Trinity for the inaugural USL Super League season.

== Early life ==
Dorsey was born in Baltimore, Maryland, to Van and Jessica Dorsey, and has an older sister. She began playing soccer at age five and lacrosse shortly thereafter. Her father played college soccer at Middlebury and coached her first club team when she was six or seven.

Dorsey played high school soccer, basketball, and lacrosse at McDonogh School, a private prep school in Owings Mills, Maryland. Her lacrosse team went undefeated to win IAAM championships in 2016, 2017, and 2019, with Dorsey in midfield; she sat out the 2018 season after suffering an ACL tear. She also won three IAAM titles with the soccer team in 2015, 2017, and 2018, playing as a forward for her first three seasons and right back in her senior year. That year, after captaining both teams to undefeated records, she received All-American honors in both sports and was named The Baltimore Sun's High School Female Athlete of the Year. While in high school, she played club soccer for the Bethesda Soccer Club and club lacrosse for Sky Walkers Lacrosse.

== College career ==
=== Soccer ===
Dorsey chose to attend the University of North Carolina because it was a school where she could play both soccer and lacrosse, doing so on a lacrosse scholarship. She was the sixth person in school history to play for both programs. In her freshman season in 2019, she appeared in all 27 games (18 starts) for the soccer team as they won the ACC tournament and reached the NCAA championship game, where they lost to Stanford on penalties. She was named to the Freshman Best XI second team by TopDrawerSoccer. She started all 12 games in the first half of the 2020 season, then sat out the spring half (held due to the COVID-19 pandemic) while with the lacrosse team.

Dorsey had an injury at the start of her junior season in 2021, returning to make 8 appearances (6 starts) and score her first goal, which came against Boston College. In her senior season in 2022, she started 22 games and helped North Carolina record one of the best defenses in the ACC. During the NCAA tournament, she scored her second career goal in a 3–2 semifinal win against Florida State, before finishing runner-up to UCLA in the title game. She missed the entire 2023 season due to an ACL injury she suffered with the lacrosse team in the spring.

=== Lacrosse ===
Dorsey played in all 7 games (2 starts) for the Tar Heels lacrosse team as a freshman in 2020, before the season was cancelled due to the pandemic. She appeared in 19 games in her sophomore season in 2021, helping North Carolina go undefeated on the way to the semifinals of the NCAA tournament, where they lost to eventual champions Boston College. In her junior season in 2022, she took on a bigger role and played in 19 games (15 starts) as North Carolina became undefeated national champions. She started at midfield in the national title game, a 12–11 victory over Boston College, winning the third national title in program history and the first since 2016. She started 11 games in her senior season in 2023 before suffering an ACL tear that ended her college career.

== Club career ==
Dorsey was selected by the North Carolina Courage in the third round (40th overall) of the 2024 NWSL Draft. She was signed to a three-year contract. On August 9, 2024, North Carolina announced that she would be loaned to Dallas Trinity for the rest of the year ahead of the USL Super League's inaugural season. She appeared in the starting lineup of Trinity's first-ever game on August 18, a 1–1 draw against the Tampa Bay Sun, which marked Dorsey's return to action after her ACL injury in 2023. Her first professional assist set up Sam Meza's equalizer against DC Power FC on September 7. During the USL winter break, she was waived by the Courage and re-signed by Trinity. She made 26 appearances in the 2024–25 regular season, logging more minutes than any other Dallas defender, as the team placed third of eight teams. In the playoffs, Dallas matched up against the Tampa Bay Sun in the semifinals. Dorsey set up the opening goal through a cross to Hannah Davison, but the game ended as a 2–1 loss.

== International career ==
Dorsey was called up to the United States under-20 team for friendlies in December 2019.

== Career statistics ==
=== Club ===
| Club | Season | League | | | Playoffs | | Total | |
| Club | Season | Division | Apps | Goals | Apps | Goals | Apps | Goals |
|---|---|---|---|---|---|---|---|---|
| North Carolina Courage | 2024 | NWSL | 0 | 0 | — | | 0 | 0 |
| Dallas Trinity (loan) | 2024–25 | USL Super League | 13 | 0 | — | | 13 | 0 |
| Dallas Trinity | 2024–25 | USL Super League | 13 | 0 | 1 | 0 | 14 | 0 |
| Career total | | | 26 | 0 | 1 | 0 | 27 | 0 |
