= Maya Gordon =

American soccer player (born 2001)

Personal information
- Full name: Maya Grace Gordon
- Date of birth: September 13, 2001 (age 25)
- Place of birth: Fort Lauderdale, Florida
- Height: 5 ft 6 in (1.68 m)
- Position: Defender

Team information
- Current team: Kansas City Current II

College career
Years	Team	Apps	(Gls)
2019–2023	LSU Tigers	86	(0)

Senior career*
Years	Team	Apps	(Gls)
2024–2025	Dallas Trinity	0	(0)
2024	→ Washington Spirit (loan)	0	(0)
2025–	Kansas City Current II		
- * Club domestic league appearances and goals as of September 22, 2024

Maya Grace Gordon (born September 13, 2001) is an American soccer player who plays as a defender for Kansas City Current II. She played college soccer for the LSU Tigers.

== College career ==
During her time at LSU, Gordon helped lead the Tigers to two NCAA Division I women's soccer tournament appearances but would only advance to the round of 32 once in 2018.

During the first round of the 2022 SEC Tournament on October 30, 2022, Gordon was issued a red card in a match against Ole Miss for striking Ole Miss player Ramsey Davis in double overtime. The incident occurred after Gordon regained ball possession from Davis, who fouled her. Video shows Davis using excessive force, prompting Gordon to retaliate. The fight was broken up quickly, but LSU teammate Rammie Noel went after Davis, bringing her to the ground. All three players—Gordon, Davis, and Noel—were issued red cards. LSU was eliminated by Ole Miss in a penalty shootout.

== Club career ==
Gordon entered the 2024 NWSL Draft alongside 236 other players but went undrafted. On January 23, 2024, she received an invitation to join Bay FC's open training camp as a non-roster invitee.

=== Dallas Trinity ===
On June 12, 2024, Gordon signed her first professional contract with the newly formed Dallas Trinity FC for their inaugural season in the USL Super League. Gordon made her club debut on August 31, 2024 in a friendly match against Barcelona at the Cotton Bowl. In the 29th minute, she suffered an injury which forced her to leave the game. Gordon later would undergo surgery on her knee shortly after.

==== Washington Spirit (loan) ====
In July 2024, Dallas Trinity and the Washington Spirit agreed to a short term loan deal for Gordon, allowing her to play for the remainder of the 2024 NWSL x Liga MX Femenil Summer Cup group stage games with Washington. She made her club debut against Gotham FC on July 28, 2024 in a 1–0 loss at Subaru Park.

== Personal life ==
Gordon grew up in South Florida and has three younger brothers, who are triplets. She went to and played for Cypress Bay High School in Weston, Florida. She would go on to help Cypress Bay win back to back district titles. She graduated from LSU with a Bachelor's degree in Sociology.

== Career statistics ==
=== College ===
Team	Season	Regular season			SEC Tournament		NCAA Tournament		Total	
Team	Season	Division	Apps	Goals	Apps	Goals	Apps	Goals	Apps	Goals
LSU Lady Tigers	2019	SEC	10	0	—		—		10	0
LSU Lady Tigers	2020–21	SEC	14	0	3	0	—		17	0
LSU Lady Tigers	2021	SEC	17	0	2	0	1	0	20	0
LSU Lady Tigers	2022	SEC	18	0	1	0	—		19	0
LSU Lady Tigers	2023	SEC	18	0	1	0	1	0	20	0
Total			77	0	7	0	2	0	86	0

=== Club ===
As of September 22, 2024

Club	Season	League			Domestic Cup		Continental		Other		Total	
Club	Season	Division	Apps	Goals	Apps	Goals	Apps	Goals	Apps	Goals	Apps	Goals
Dallas Trinity FC	2024–25	USL Super League	0	0	0	0	—		1	0	1	0
Washington Spirit (loan)	2024	NWSL	—		—		1 (Note: Appearances in NWSL x Liga MX Femenil Summer Cup)	0	—		1	0
Career total			0	0	0	0	1	0	1	0	2	0
