= Maja Henriksson =

Swedish soccer player (born 1999)

Personal information
- Date of birth: February 18, 1999 (age 27)
- Place of birth: Älvängen, Sweden
- Height: 5 ft 7 in (1.70 m)
- Position: Defender

Youth career
- 2015: Älvängens IK
- 2015: Jitex
- 2016–2019: Kungsbacka DFF

College career
Years	Team	Apps	(Gls)
2019–2022	Keiser Seahawks	86	(30)
2023	Nova Southeastern Sharks	10	(4)

Senior career*
Years	Team	Apps	(Gls)
2024–2025	Dallas Trinity	2	(0)
- * Club domestic league appearances and goals as of 1 July 2025

Maja Henriksson (born February 18, 1999) is a Swedish professional soccer player who plays as a defender.

== Early life ==
Henriksson grew up in Sweden and played at Aspero Idrottsgymnasium as well as the Swedish youth national team.

She played at Kungsbacka DFF in the Elitettan. In 2018, Kungsbacka won the Elitettan title, securing promotion to the top level Damallsvenskan.

== College career ==
=== Keiser University ===
Henriksson joined the Keiser Seahawks in 2019 and immediately had an impact. In her first year, she ranked fourth in assists in the NAIA. She was also part of a dominant Seahawk team that won back-to-back NAIA championships in 2019 and 2020.

=== Nova Southeastern University ===
In 2023, Henriksson joined Nova Southeastern University for her final year of eligibility where in the 10 games she played, she helped the defense record 7 shutouts.

== Club career ==
=== Dallas Trinity FC ===
On June 28, 2024, Maja Henriksson signed her first professional contract with Dallas Trinity FC. She made her club debut on 13 September 2024 in a friendly match against Barcelona. Her league debut would come twelve days later against Lexington SC, coming in as an 85th minute substitute replacing Gabriela Guillén.

== Personal life ==
Henriksson received a Bachelors degree in Business Administration with a focus in International Business from Keiser University.

== Career statistics ==
=== Club summary ===
As of 6 October 2024

Club	Season	League			Playoffs		Other		Total	
Club	Season	Division	Apps	Goals	Apps	Goals	Apps	Goals	Apps	Goals
Jitex	2015	Elitettan	1	0	—		—		1	0
Kungsbacka	2016	Elitettan	12	0	—		—		12	0
Kungsbacka	2017	Elitettan	5	1	—		—		5	1
Dallas Trinity FC	2024–25	USL Super League	2	0	0	0	1	0	3	0
Career total			20	1	0	0	1	0	21	1
