= Auki Kigongo Angel =

Ugandan female association footballer

- Auki with Uganda in 2026

Personal information
- Place of birth: Entebbe, Uganda
- Positions: Midfielder; winger; defender

Team information
- Current team: Uganda Martyrs Lubaga

International career
Years	Team	Apps	(Gls)
3	Uganda	4	
1	Uganda U20	3	

Angel Auki Kigongo is a Ugandan professional footballer who plays as a midfielder and winger for Uganda Martyrs Lubaga Women Football Club She also plays as a defender and winger for the Uganda women's national football team, known as the Crested Cranes. She plays as a winger and midfielder for the Uganda women's national under-20 football team, known as the Queen Cranes.

== Early life ==
Auki was born in Entebbe and raised in Kajjansi, with family roots in Pakwach. She is the fourth-born of six children in her family. Auki's primary and secondary education was funded through bursaries she received in recognition of her footballing abilities. She attended her primary education at Kitende Primary School in Entebbe and St Noah Primary School. She started her secondary education at Rines Secondary School before transferring to Uganda Martyrs High School Lubaga where she completed both her UCE and UACE Level education.

== Youth career ==
Auki's football talent was noticed by Ivan during the Entebbe Football Nationals when she was playing for the Kitende Primary School. Ivan was the team manager of St Noah Primary School.

Auki played football for Rines Secondary School before transferring to Uganda Martyrs High School Lubaga (UMHS), where she joined Uganda Martyrs High School Lubaga Football Club. Auki joined Kick It Soccer Academy, where she trained and played football under the guidance of Coach Alex Kalema.

== Club career ==
She plays for Uganda Martyrs Lubaga Women FC in the FUFA Women Super League.

== International career ==
Auki plays for the Uganda women's national under-20 football team (The Queen Cranes) as a midfielder. She participated in the 2026 FIFA U20 Women’s World Cup qualifiers.

Auki also plays for the Uganda’s senior women’s national football team (The Crested Cranes) as a midfielder and as a forward. Her debut was in October 2024 when the Crested Cranes played against DRC. She participated in the 2028 CAF Women’s Olympic Qualifying Tournament against the Zambia women's national football team and Ghana women's national football team. She participated in the 2026 Women Africa Cup of Nations Qualifiers.

== Awards and recognition ==
- Auki has been nominated twice for the FUFA Women Super League player of the month awards in October 2024 and December 2025.
- Auki won the 2023 Women’s Cup with Uganda Martyrs High School Lubaga Football Club after defeating She Maroons football club.
- Auki was named among the 2025/2026 FUFA Women Super League Best XI at the FUFA Awards 2026.
- Auki was nominated for the player of the month award in October 2024.

== See also ==
- Shadia Nankya
- 2026 FIFA U-20 Women's World Cup
- Uganda women's national football team
