= Haley Berg =

American soccer player (born 1998)

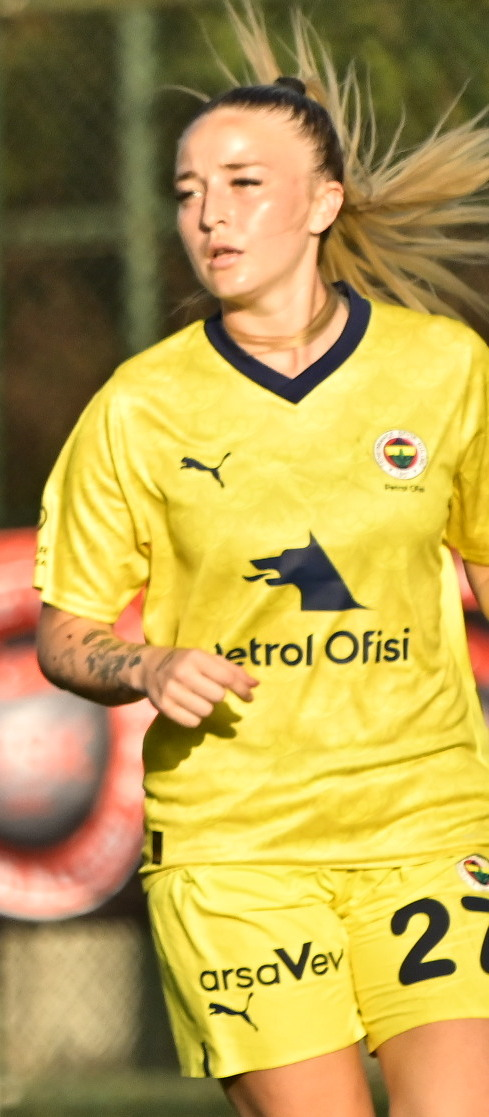
- Berg with Fenerbahçe in 2023

Personal information
- Full name: Haley Lanier Berg
- Date of birth: September 23, 1998 (age 28)
- Place of birth: Celina, Texas, U.S.
- Height: 5 ft 6 in (1.68 m)
- Position: Midfielder

College career
Years	Team	Apps	(Gls)
2017–2021	Texas Longhorns	73	(24)

Senior career*
Years	Team	Apps	(Gls)
2021–2022	Zaragoza CFF	30	(1)
2022	Houston Dash	0	(0)
2022–2023	FC Nordsjælland	9	(0)
2023	Valur	12	(2)
2023–2024	Fenerbahçe S.K.	16	(3)
2024–2025	Dallas Trinity	3	(0)

International career
2013	United States U15	–	(–)
2016	United States U18	3	(1)
2017	United States U19	–	(–)
- * Club domestic league appearances and goals as of September 14, 2024

Haley Lanier Berg (born September 23, 1998) is an American professional soccer player who plays as a midfielder. She played college soccer for the Texas Longhorns.

== College career ==
=== Texas Longhorns ===
Berg was a highly sought-after recruit in high school, ranked as the #2 prospect in Texas and the #11 overall midfield prospect nationally. She received multiple offers to play college soccer including offers from Notre Dame, Texas A&M, Duke, and Colorado but ultimately chose to join the University of Texas. From 2017 to 2021, she made 73 appearances and scored 24 goals for the Longhorns. In 2019, Berg led the Longhorns in goals (8) and assists (9).

== Professional career ==
=== Zaragoza CFF ===
In 2021, Berg joined Spanish side Zaragoza CFF scoring one goal in thirty matches.

=== Houston Dash ===
In June 2022, she returned back to the US, joining the Houston Dash for the 2022 NWSL season.

=== FC Nordsjælland ===
In August 2022, she transferred to FC Nordsjælland to play in the Danish Women's League. She appeared in just nine games for the Danish side.

=== Valur ===
Berg joined league champions Valur in Reykjavík, Iceland in March 2023. She made her club debut on April 17, 2023 in the final of the Icelandic Women's Football Super Cup against Stjarnan where Valur lost on penalties. Berg scored her first goal with the club on May 21, 2023 in a 1-2 loss to Knattspyrnufélagið Þróttur in the Icelandic Women's Football Cup.

=== Fenerbahçe ===
In September 2023, Berg transferred to Istanbul, Turkey and joined Fenerbahçe S.K. to play in the Turkish Women's Super League.

=== Dallas Trinity FC ===
Berg joined Dallas Trinity in June 2024, ahead of the inaugural USL Super League season, becoming the team's 3rd signing overall. Berg made her debut for the club on August 18, 2024 as a second half substitute for Samantha Meza during Dallas's inaugural match against Tampa Bay.

== International career ==
=== Youth teams ===
Berg played for the United States at several different levels in their youth squads. In 2013, she was selected to the U.S. girls' U-15 team, and took part at a training camp.

As part of the U.S. women's U-18 team, she played in three matches and scored one goal at the 2016 Women's International Cup held in Northern Ireland.

In early 2017, she joined a training camp of the U.S. women's U-19 team in Sunrise, Florida.

== Personal life ==
Berg was born in Celina, Texas. She has three siblings.

After graduating from Celina High School, she studied Applied Learning & Development: Youth & Community Studies at the University of Texas at Austin.

== Career statistics ==
=== College ===
College	Regular Season				Big 12 Tournament		NCAA Tournament		Total	
College	Conference	Season	Apps	Goals	Apps	Goals	Apps	Goals	Apps	Goals
Texas Longhorns	Big 12	2017	17	5	1	0	3	1	21	6
Texas Longhorns	Big 12	2018	18	6	2	0	1	0	21	6
Texas Longhorns	Big 12	2019	18	8	1	0	1	0	20	8
Texas Longhorns	Big 12	2020–21	11	4	—		—		11	4
Career total			64	24	4	0	5	1	73	24

=== Club ===
As of September 14, 2024

Club	Season	League			League Cup		National Cup (Note: Includes appearance(s) in Copa de la Reina de Fútbol, Danish Women's Cup, and Icelandic Women's Football Cup)		Other		Total	
Club	Season	Division	Apps	Goals	Apps	Goals	Apps	Goals	Apps	Goals	Apps	Goals
Zaragoza CFF	2021–22	Segunda Federación	30	1	1 (Note: Appearance(s) in 2021–22 Segunda División Pro Play-offs)	0	2	1	—		33	2
Houston Dash	2022	NWSL	0	0	0	0	—		—		0	0
FC Nordsjælland	2022–23	Elitedivisionen	9	0	0	0	2	0	—		11	0
Valur	2023	Besta deild kvenna	12	2	0	0	1	0	1 (Note: Includes appearance in Icelandic Women's Football Super Cup)	0	14	2
Fenerbahçe S.K.	2023–24	Türkish Women's Football Super League	16	3	0	0	—		—		16	3
Dallas Trinity FC	2024–25	USL Super League	3	0	—		—		1	0	4	0
Career total			70	6	1	0	5	1	1	0	78	7

== Honors ==
=== The University of Texas ===
Individual

- Big 12 Freshman of the Week (Sept. 26 & Oct. 3, 2017)
- 2017 Big 12 All-Freshman Team
- 2017, 2019 All-Big 12 Conference Second Team
- 2017 United Soccer Coaches First-Team All-South Region
- 2017 Big 12 Conference Freshman of the Year
- 2017 Top Drawer Soccer Second-Team National Freshman Best XI
- 2018 United Soccer Coaches First-Team All-Midwest Region
- 2018 Big 12 Championship All-Tournament Team
- 2018 All-Big 12 Conference First Team
- 2018, 2019 Preseason All-Big 12 Conference Team
- 2019 MAC Hermann Trophy Preseason Watch List
