= Jenny Danielsson =

Finnish footballer (born 1994)

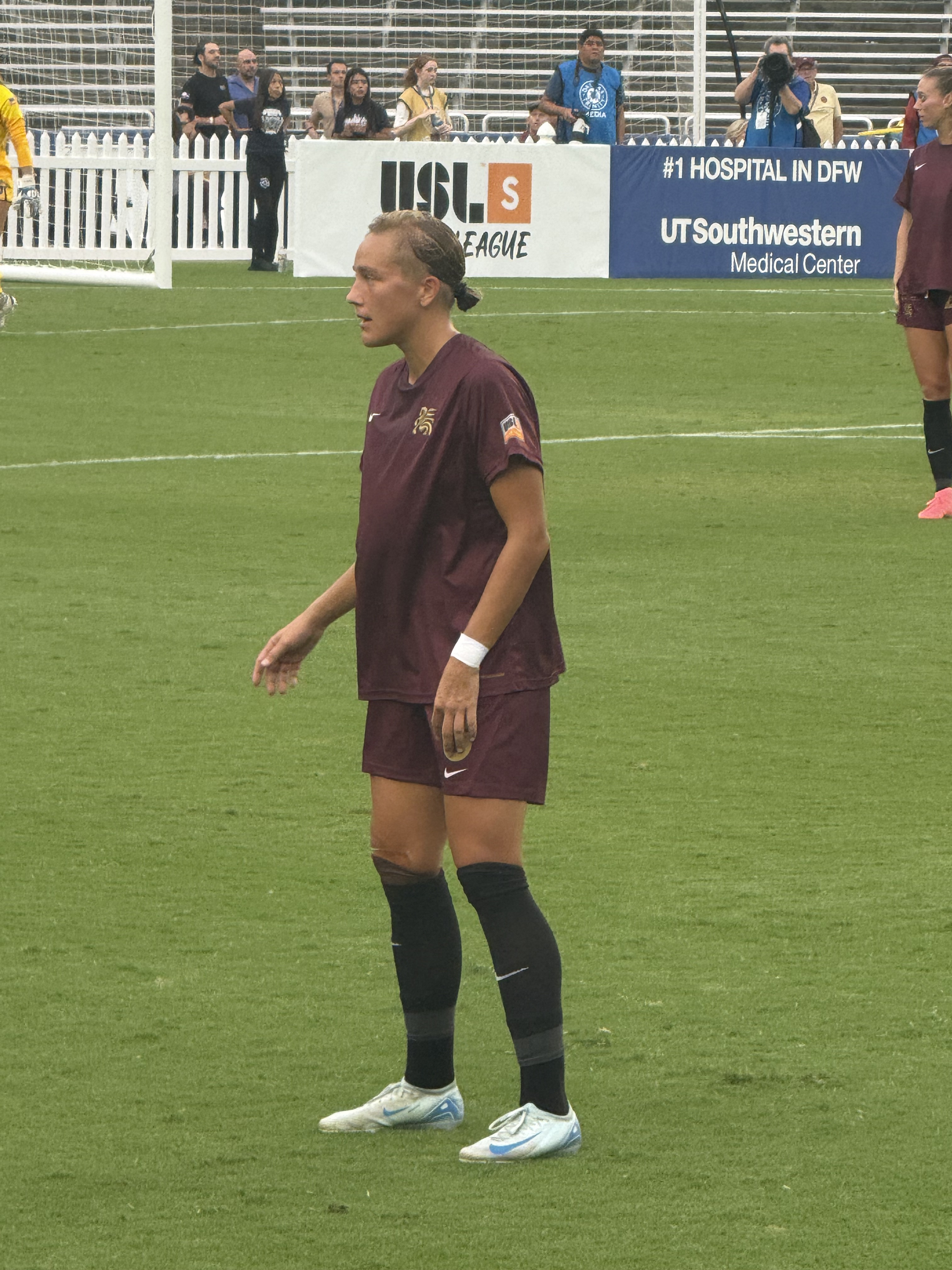
- Danielsson with Dallas Trinity in 2024

Personal information
- Full name: Jenny-Julia Danielsson
- Date of birth: 30 August 1994 (age 32)
- Place of birth: Espoo, Finland
- Height: 1.77 m (5 ft 10 in)
- Positions: Midfielder; forward

Youth career
- HooGee
- FC Honka

Senior career*
Years	Team	Apps	(Gls)
2011–2015	FC Honka	70	(18)
2016	Kristianstads DFF	18	(3)
2016–2017	Sporting de Huelva	8	(0)
2017–2018	Åland United	41	(6)
2019	Kungsbacka	15	(1)
2020–2022	AIK	52	(12)
2022–2023	Rangers	23	(5)
2023–2024	KIF Örebro	9	(1)
2024	Växjö DFF	11	(1)
2024–2026	Dallas Trinity	25	(2)

International career^{‡}
2014	Finland U20	1	(0)
2015–	Finland	38	(8)
- * Club domestic league appearances and goals as of 26 May 2026 ‡ National team caps and goals as of 13 May 2024

Jenny-Julia Danielsson (born 30 August 1994) is a Finnish professional footballer who plays for the Finland national team.

== Club career ==
Danielsson made her league debut against HJK on 13 August 2011. She scored her first league goal against ONS Oulu on 25 August 2012, scoring in the 90th+6th minute. In 2014, Danielsson won the 2014 Finnish Cup with FC Honka, although she didn't play in the final.

Danielsson made her league debut against Rosengård on 16 April 2016. She scored her first league goal against Göteborg FC on 14 May 2016, scoring in the 26th minute.

In 2016, Danielsson was announced at Sporting Huelva.

On 16 April 2017, Danielsson was announced at Åland United. She made her league debut against Pallokissat on 29 April 2017. Danielsson scored her first league goal against TPS on 6 May 2017, scoring in the 5th minute.

Danielsson then moved to Kungsbacka. She made her league debut against Göteborg FC on 13 April 2019. She scored her first league goal against Limhamn Bunkeflo, scoring in the 64th minute. Danielsson suffered an injury that kept her out for several weeks.

On 4 December 2019, Danielsson was announced at AIK. She scored on her league debut against Hammarby on 14 June 2020, scoring in the 42nd minute. On 8 December 2020, she extended her contract for 2 years.

On 30 July 2022, Danielsson was announced at Rangers. She made her league debut against Glasgow Women on 7 August 2022. She scored her first league goals against Hamilton Academical, scoring in the 9th and 24th minute. Danielsson won the 2022 August SWPL POTM award. On 21 July 2023, it was announced that she would leave the club when her contract expired.

On 25 July 2023, Danielsson was announced at KIF Örebro. She made her league debut against Norrköping on 2 September 2023. Danielsson scored her first league goal against Uppsala on 3 November 2023, scoring in the 66nd minute.

On 17 April 2024, Danielsson was announced at Växjö. She made her league debut against KIF Örebro on 20 April 2024. Danielsson scored her first league goal against AIK on 16 June 2024, scoring in the 11th minute.

In June 2024, American club Dallas Trinity FC signed Danielsson ahead of the inaugural USL Super League season. Danielsson made her league debut against the Tampa Bay Sun on 14 August 2024. She spent two seasons in Dallas, totaling 25 league appearances and 2 goals.

== International career ==
Danielsson was called up to the 2019 Cyprus Women's Cup.

Danielsson played for Finland at the UEFA Women's Euro 2022. The following year, Danielsson was part of the Finland squad that won the 2023 Cyprus Women's Cup for the first time.

== International goals ==
No.	Date	Venue	Opponent	Score	Result	Competition
1.	12 April 2016	Stadion Mitar Mićo Goliš, Petrovac, Montenegro	Montenegro	3–1	7–1	2017 UEFA Women's Euro qualifying
2.	3 June 2016	Tehtaan kenttä, Valkeakoski, Finland	Republic of Ireland	2–0	4–1	2017 UEFA Women's Euro qualifying
3.	18 January 2017	Pinatar Arena, San Pedro del Pinatar, Spain	Russia	1–0	2–0	Friendly
4.	18 January 2017	Pinatar Arena, San Pedro del Pinatar, Spain	Russia	2–0	2–0	Friendly
5.	19 September 2017	Estádio Marcolino de Castro, Santa Maria da Feira, Portugal	Portugal	1–0	1–1	Friendly
6.	12 April 2022	Bolt Arena, Helsinki, Finland	Georgia	6–0	6–0	2023 FIFA Women's World Cup qualification
7.	19 February 2023	AEK Arena, Larnaca, Cyprus	Hungary	3–0	8–0	2023 Cyprus Women's Cup
8.	19 February 2023	AEK Arena, Larnaca, Cyprus	Hungary	8–0	8–0	2023 Cyprus Women's Cup

== Honours ==
FC Honka

- Finnish Women's Cup: 2014, 2015

Rangers

- Scottish Women's Premier League Cup: 2022
