= Hannah Davison =

American soccer player (born 1997)

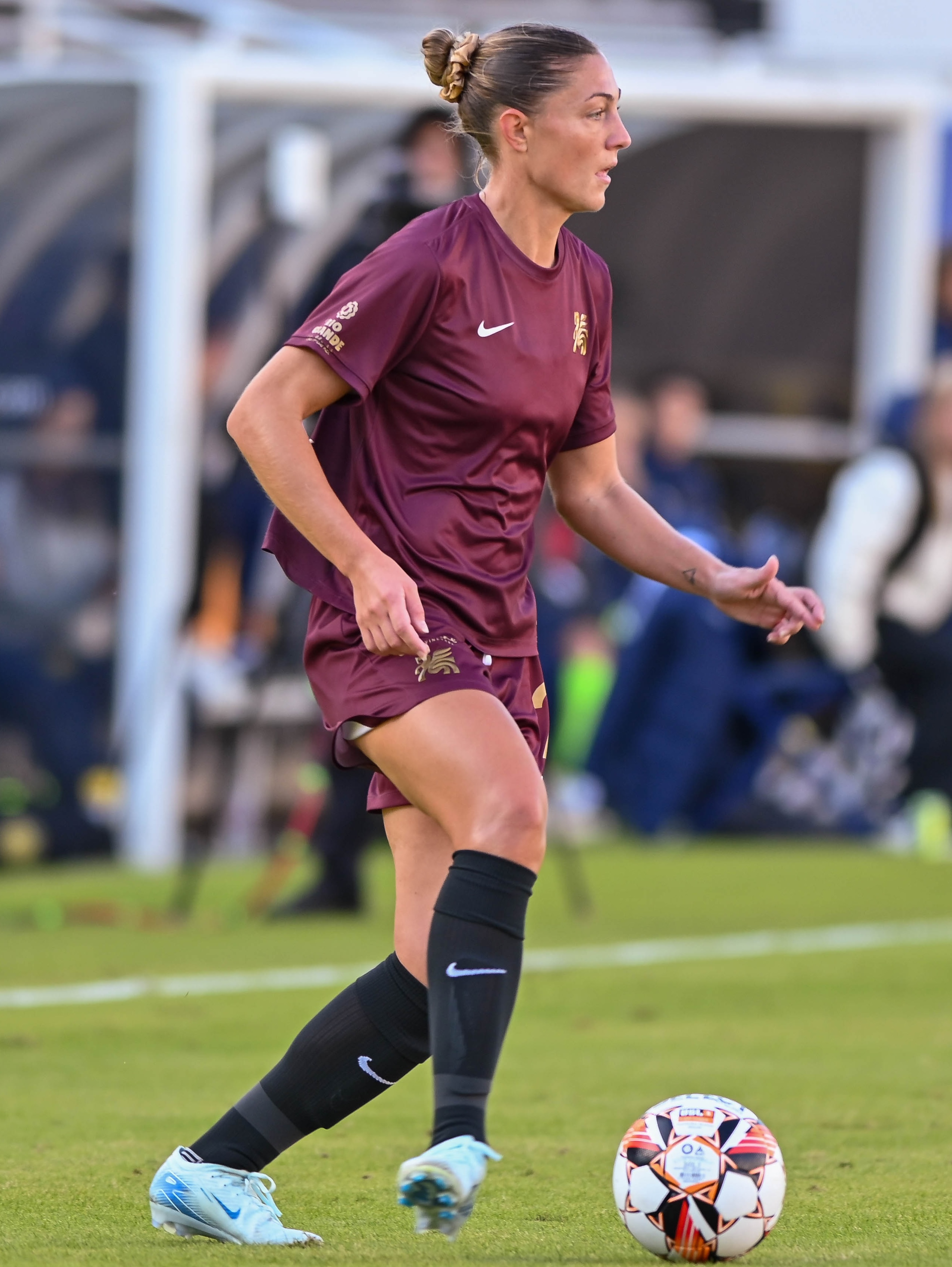
- Davison with Dallas Trinity in 2024

Personal information
- Full name: Hannah Elise Davison
- Date of birth: April 9, 1997 (age 29)
- Place of birth: Geneva, Illinois, U.S.
- Height: 5 ft 8 in (1.73 m)
- Position: Defender

Youth career
- 2010–2015: Chicago Eclipse Select

College career
Years	Team	Apps	(Gls)
2015–2018	Northwestern Wildcats	80	(4)

Senior career*
Years	Team	Apps	(Gls)
2019–2021	Chicago Red Stars	2	(0)
2021–2022	AIK	26	(0)
2022–2023	Rangers	27	(2)
2023	KIF Örebro	9	(0)
2024–2026	Dallas Trinity	45	(2)
- * Club domestic league appearances and goals as of 05:14, May 26, 2026 (UTC)

Hannah Elise Davison (born April 9, 1997) is an American professional soccer player who plays as a defender. She played college soccer for the Northwestern Wildcats. She has previously played professionally for the Chicago Red Stars of the National Women's Soccer League (NWSL), Swedish Damallsvenskan clubs AIK and KIF Örebro, Scottish Women's Premier League club Rangers, and USL Super League club Dallas Trinity FC.

== College career ==
Before college, Davison was a highly touted recruit and ultimately joined Northwestern University. She had in instant impact for the Wildcats defense. In her senior year in 2018, she helped the Wildcat's defense post the longest shutout streak in program history.

== Club career ==
Davison was drafted by the Chicago Red Stars in the 4th Round as the 33rd overall pick. Davison made her NWSL debut in the 2020 NWSL Challenge Cup on July 1, 2020 but did not appear in any regular season games for Chicago.

On March 11, 2021, Davison signed a two-year contract with Swedish side, AIK.

On August 3, 2022, Davison joined Rangers. She helped Rangers lift their first ever Scottish Women's Premier League Cup trophy against seven time winners, Hibernian in a 2–0 win on December 11, 2022. Davison scored her first professional goal during the 2022–23 UEFA Women's Champions League in an away match against Greek side PAOK FC on August 21, 2022. Rangers did not renew Davison's contract, and she departed the club in July 2023.

After leaving Rangers, Davison signed with KIF Örebro for the remainder of the 2023 season. At the time, the club were facing relegation. In the nine matches Davison played, she helped the team secure four wins, lifting them out of relegation.

On June 26, 2024, it was announced that Davison joined the newly formed Dallas Trinity FC for the inaugural USL Super League season. On August 18, 2024, during Dallas's inaugural match, Davison scored the club's very first goal in the first half of a 1–1 draw against Tampa Bay Sun FC. Davison got her second club goal on October 6, 2024 against Spokane Zephyr FC. She spent two seasons with the Trinity before departing from the club in June 2026.

== Career statistics ==
=== College ===
College	Regular Season				Big 10 Tournament		NCAA Tournament		Total	
College	Conference	Season	Apps	Goals	Apps	Goals	Apps	Goals	Apps	Goals
Northwestern Wildcats	Big 10	2015	15	1	1	0	2	0	18	1
Northwestern Wildcats	Big 10	2016	20	1	2	0	1	0	23	1
Northwestern Wildcats	Big 10	2017	15	2	3	0	2	0	20	2
Northwestern Wildcats	Big 10	2018	19	0	–		–		19	0
Career total			69	4	6	0	5	0	80	4

=== Club ===
As of matches played on May 23, 2026

Club	Season	League			League Cup		National Cups (Note: Includes appearances in Scottish Women's Cup, Scottish Women's Premier League Cup, and Svenska Cupen)		Continental (Note: Includes appearances in UEFA Women's Champions League)		Other		Total	
Club	Season	Division	Apps	Goals	Apps	Goals	Apps	Goals	Apps	Goals	Apps	Goals	Apps	Goals
Chicago Red Stars	2019	NWSL	0	0	–		–		1 (Note: Friendly against USWNT U-23)	0	0	0	1	0
Chicago Red Stars	2020	NWSL	2	0	–		–		–		1 (Note: Includes appearances in NWSL Challenge Cup)	0	3	0
Chicago Red Stars	2021	NWSL	0	0	–		–		–		–		0	0
AIK	2021	Damallsvenskan	19	0	–		–		–		–		19	0
AIK	2022	Damallsvenskan	7	0	–		–		–		–		7	0
Rangers	2022–23	Scottish Women's Premier League	27	2	–		2	0	2	1	–		31	3
KIF Örebro DFF	2023	Damallsvenskan	9	0	–		1	0	–		–		10	0
Dallas Trinity FC	2024–25	USL Super League	25	2	1	1	–		–		–		26	3
Dallas Trinity FC	2025–26	USL Super League	20	0	1	0	–		–		–		21	0
Career total			109	4	2	1	3	0	3	1	1	0	116	5

== Honors ==
Rangers

- Scottish Women's Premier League Cup: 2022
