= Athalie Palomo =

Mexican footballer (born 1997)

Personal information
- Full name: Athalie Mckenzie Palomo Carranza
- Date of birth: 7 September 2000 (age 26)
- Place of birth: Irving, Texas, United States
- Height: 1.65 m (5 ft 5 in)
- Position: Centre-back

College career
Years	Team	Apps	(Gls)
2019–2022	Pittsburgh Panthers	73	(2)

Senior career*
Years	Team	Apps	(Gls)
2023–2024	UANL	3	(0)
2025	Dallas Trinity	5	(0)

International career^{‡}
2018	Mexico U-20		
- * Club domestic league appearances and goals as of 1 July 2025 ‡ National team caps and goals as of 29 February 2024

Athalie Mckenzie Palomo Carranza (born 7 September 2000) is a professional footballer who plays as a Centre-back. Born and raised in the United States, she represents Mexico internationally. She played collegiately for the Pittsburgh Panthers.

== Career ==
=== UANL ===
In 2023, she started her professional career with Tigres UANL.

=== Dallas Trinity FC ===
On April 8th, 2025, Dallas Trinity announced they had signed Palomo to an undisclosed contract.

== International career ==
Palomo represented Mexico at one FIFA U-20 Women's World Cup edition (2018).
