= Tamara Bolt =

Brazilian footballer (born 2003)

- Bolt with the Washington Spirit in 2026

Personal information
- Full name: Tamara Paranaguá do Carmo
- Date of birth: May 12, 2003 (age 23)
- Place of birth: Salvador, Bahia, Brazil
- Height: 1.76 m (5 ft 9 in)
- Positions: Right winger; right back

Team information
- Current team: Washington Spirit
- Number: 16

Senior career*
| Years | Team | Apps | (Gls) |
| 2022–2024 | Internacional | 47 | (8) |
| 2025– | Washington Spirit | 17 | (1) |
| 2025 | → Dallas Trinity (loan) | 26 | (1) |

International career^{‡}
| 2026– | Brazil | 1 | (0) |
- * Club domestic league appearances and goals as of 05:23, 15 November 2026 (UTC) ‡ National team caps and goals as of 10 October 2026

Tamara Paranaguá do Carmo (born May 12, 2003), known as Tamara Bolt, is a Brazilian professional footballer who plays as a right winger for the Washington Spirit of the National Women's Soccer League (NWSL) and the Brazil national team.

== Career ==
Born in Salvador, Bolt played for Bahia's youth side before joining Internacional in September 2021. She began playing for the club's first team at right back or winger in 2022. In three seasons with Internacional, she made 88 appearances, scoring 10 goals and 15 assists, and won two Gauchão state titles and one Ladies Cup.

On 9 January 2025, the National Women's Soccer League (NWSL)'s Washington Spirit announced that they had signed Bolt to a one-year contract with options to extend another two years. The following month, she and teammate Deborah Abiodun joined USL Super League club Dallas Trinity on a year-long loan for an undisclosed fee. Bolt's first and only goal for the Trinity came five minutes into a 3–1 win over Lexington SC on 26 April. On 31 May, she assisted the opening goal by Allie Thornton in the season finale against the Carolina Ascent, a 2–1 win that clinched a playoff berth for Trinity. During the USL offseason, the Spirit picked up Bolt's contract option for the following year. She returned to Dallas in the fall and finished the loan having made 27 appearances.

On 13 March 2026, Bolt debuted for the Spirit in their season-opening 1–0 loss to the Portland Thorns. On 30 June, the Spirit exercised the second option year in Bolt's contract for the following season. On 20 September, she scored her first goal for the Spirit, heading Trinity Rodman's cross to conclude a 3–0 victory over the Chicago Stars.

== International career ==
Bolt received her first call-up to the Brazil national team in September 2026. She made her international debut in a 3–1 friendly win over Argentina on 10 October 2026.

== Personal life ==
Bolt is nicknamed after the Jamaican champion sprinter Usain Bolt.

== Honors ==
Internacional

- Campeonato Gaúcho de Futebol Feminino: 2021, 2023
- Brasil Ladies Cup: 2023
