= Shadia Nankya =

Ugandan footballer (born 2001)

Personal information
- Date of birth: 25 November 2001 (age 24)
- Height: 1.75 m (5 ft 9 in)
- Position: Defender

Team information
- Current team: Le Havre
- Number: 5

Senior career*
Years	Team	Apps	(Gls)
- UCU Lady Cardinals
–2025	FC Masar	27	(3)
2025	Washington Spirit	0	(0)
2025	→ Dallas Trinity (loan)	2	(0)
2026–	Le Havre	4	(0)

International career^{‡}
2021–	Uganda	5	(0)
- * Club domestic league appearances and goals as of 05:15, 25 June 2026 (UTC) ‡ National team caps and goals as of 26 October 2021

Shadia Nankya (born 25 November 2001) is a Ugandan footballer who plays as a defender for Première Ligue club Le Havre AC and the Uganda national team.

== Club career ==
Nankya has played for UCU Lady Cardinals in Uganda. She suffered a knee injury in May 2022, which kept her out of action until February 2023. She later joined FC Masar, where she made 27 appearances and scored three goals.

On 13 February 2025, Nankya transferred to the Washington Spirit in the National Women's Soccer League. She signed a two-year contract with a team option. On 8 March, she was loaned to Dallas Trinity FC for the remainder of the 2025 calendar year. She made 2 appearances in her stint with Dallas, totaling 21 minutes of play. Nankya departed from Washington on a mutual contract termination in January 2026.

In March 2026, Nankya signed for French Première Ligue club Le Havre AC on a contract through the end of the season.

== International career ==
Nankya capped for Uganda at senior level during the 2021 COSAFA Women's Championship and the 2022 Africa Women Cup of Nations qualification.

=== International goals ===
Scores and results list Uganda goal tally first

No.	Date	Venue	Opponent	Score	Result	Competition
1	23 July 2018	Kigali Stadium, Kigali, Rwanda	Tanzania	1–4	1–4	2018 CECAFA Women's Championship

== See also ==
- Auki Kigongo Angel
