= Deborah Abiodun =

Nigerian footballer (born 2003)

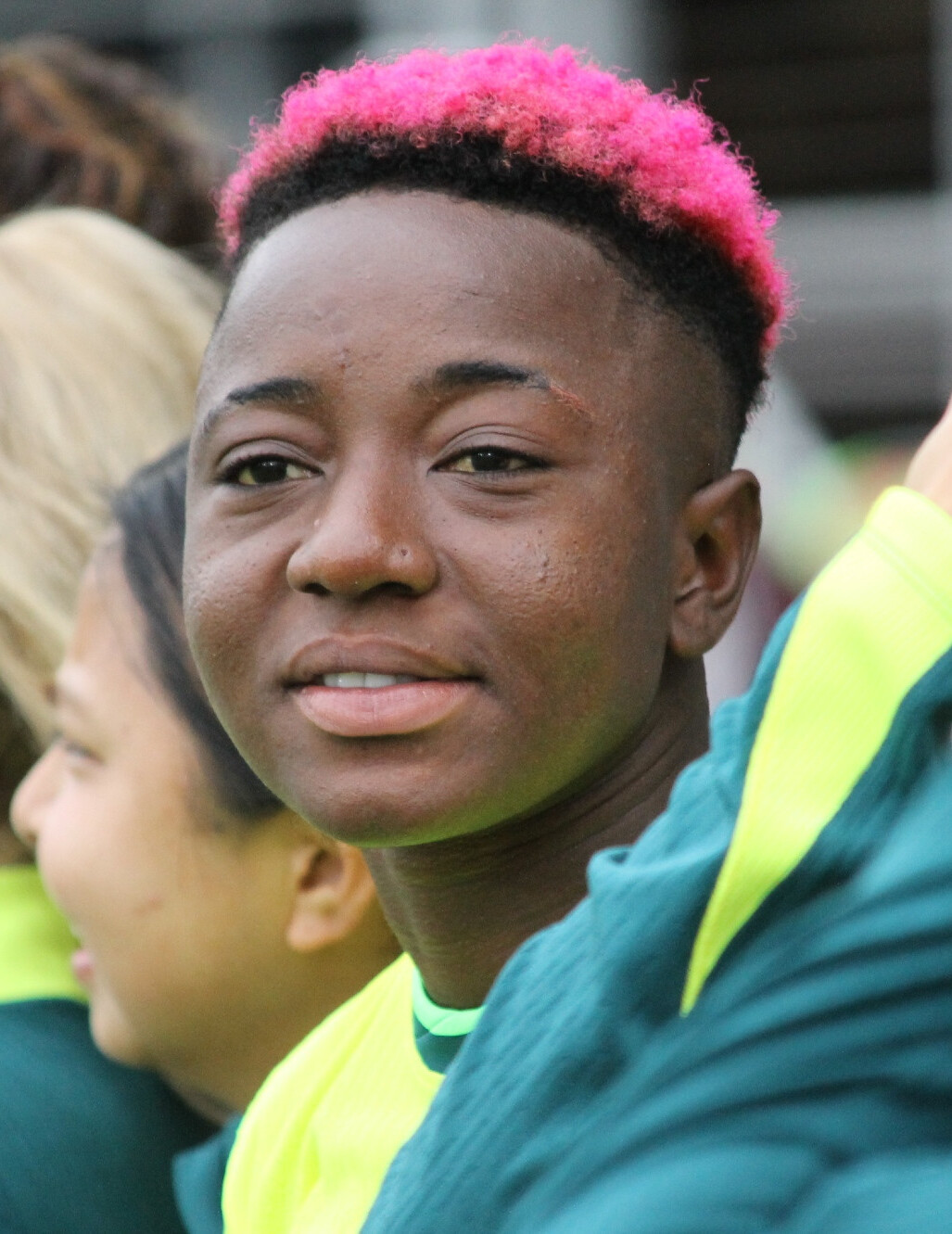
- Abiodun with the Washington Spirit in 2025

Personal information
- Full name: Deborah Ajibola Abiodun
- Date of birth: 2 November 2003 (age 23)
- Place of birth: Ibadan, Nigeria
- Height: 1.67 m (5 ft 6 in)
- Position: Midfielder

Team information
- Current team: Washington Spirit
- Number: 20

College career
Years	Team	Apps	(Gls)
2023–2024	Pittsburgh Panthers	34	(10)

Senior career*
Years	Team	Apps	(Gls)
2020–2023	Rivers Angels		
2025–	Washington Spirit	17	(0)
2025	→ Dallas Trinity (loan)	13	(0)

International career^{‡}
2022	Nigeria U-20	3	(0)
2022–	Nigeria	29	(0)
- * Club domestic league appearances and goals as of 05:22, 15 November 2026 (UTC) ‡ National team caps and goals as of 17 August 2026

Deborah Ajibola Abiodun OON (born 2 November 2003), popularly known as "Kante", is a Nigerian professional footballer who plays as a midfielder for the Washington Spirit in the National Women's Soccer League (NWSL), and the Nigeria national team. She played college soccer for the Pittsburgh Panthers, earning All-ACC honors twice.

== Early life and college career ==
Abiodun was born in Ibadan, Oyo State, and attended Nasarawa State Sport Academy. Her play with Nigeria Women Premier League club Rivers Angels caught the attention of scouts, which led to a full scholarship offer from the University of Pittsburgh.

=== Pittsburgh Panthers ===
Abiodun spent two seasons with the Pittsburgh Panthers under the coaching of Randy Waldrum, also her coach with the Nigeria national team. In her freshman season, she made 22 appearances (19 starts) and scored 6 goals with 3 assists, earning Atlantic Coast Conference (ACC) all-freshman and third-team All-ACC honors. In the NCAA tournament, she scored two times, in a 6–0 win against Ohio State in the first round and opening a 3–0 win against Memphis in the third round, as Pittsburgh made the national quarterfinals for the first time in program history. In her sophomore season, she played only 12 games (9 starts) as she missed six games due to injury. She scored 4 goals and earned second-team All-ACC honors.

== Club career ==
=== Washington Spirit ===
The Washington Spirit announced on January 6, 2025, that they had signed Abiodun to a three-year contract with an option to extend for an additional year. On February 7, 2025, the Spirit announced that Abiodun and teammate Tamara Bolt would be loaned for the year to USL Super League team Dallas Trinity FC for an undisclosed fee. Washington recalled Abiodun from her loan on August 26, 2025.

On August 31, 2025, Abiodun made her NWSL debut coming on in a 1–1 draw with Chicago Stars FC as a second-half substitute. Three days later, she scored her first goal for the Spirit, converting a deflected shot in a CONCACAF W Champions Cup match against the Vancouver Rise Academy.

On October 22, 2026, Abiodun signed a new two-year contract with the Spirit with the mutual option for another year.

== International career ==
Abiodun represented Nigeria at the 2022 FIFA U-20 Women's World Cup, starting three games. Nigeria won their group but lost 2–0 to the Netherlands in the quarterfinals on August 22. Abiodun received her first senior call-up the following month. She made her senior international debut on September 3, 2022, starting in a 4–0 friendly loss to the United States.

Abiodun was selected to Nigeria's roster for the 2023 FIFA Women's World Cup. She made her tournament debut against Canada on 21 July 2023. She was handed a red card during stoppage time after a VAR review (the first red card of the tournament) as Nigeria held on to a 0–0 draw.

Abiodun started all 3 games for Nigeria at the 2024 Paris Olympics. Nigeria lost each game and finished bottom of their group.

== Honours ==
Nigeria

- Women's Africa Cup of Nations: 2024

Orders

- Officer of the Order of the Niger
