= Sam Meza =

American soccer player (born 2001)

- Meza with the Seattle Reign in 2026

Personal information
- Full name: Samantha Meza
- Date of birth: November 7, 2001 (age 25)
- Place of birth: Dallas, Texas, U.S.
- Height: 5 ft 4 in (1.63 m)
- Position: Midfielder

Team information
- Current team: Seattle Reign
- Number: 20

College career
Years	Team	Apps	(Gls)
2020–2023	North Carolina Tar Heels	72	(7)

Senior career*
Years	Team	Apps	(Gls)
2024–	Seattle Reign	52	(0)
2024	→ Dallas Trinity (loan)	13	(2)

International career^{‡}
- United States U-15
2017–2018	United States U-17	12	(0)
2019–2020	United States U-20	11	(2)
2022–2025	United States U-23	3	(0)
2025–	United States	3	(0)
- * Club domestic league appearances and goals as of 16:36, November 8, 2026 (UTC) ‡ National team caps and goals as of January 27, 2026

Samantha Meza (born November 7, 2001) is an American professional soccer player who plays as a midfielder for Seattle Reign FC of the National Women's Soccer League (NWSL) and the United States national team. She played college soccer for the North Carolina Tar Heels, earning third-team All-American honors, and was drafted by the Reign in the second round of the 2024 NWSL Draft.

Meza represented the United States at the under-15, under-17, and under-20 level, winning CONCACAF tournaments at each level, before making her senior debut in 2025.

== Early life ==
Meza was born in Dallas, Texas, to Alma and Luis Santos, and has a younger brother. She is of Mexican descent. She grew up in Balch Springs and began playing soccer at age three. She played club soccer for Dallas Kicks, which reached the final of the US Youth Soccer National Championships one year, then moved to Solar Soccer Club of the U.S. Soccer Development Academy in 2017. She was twice named to the Best XI of her Academy conference. She attended TTU K–12 for her last two years of high school. After initially planning to attended the University of Virginia, she committed to the University of North Carolina as a junior.

== College career ==
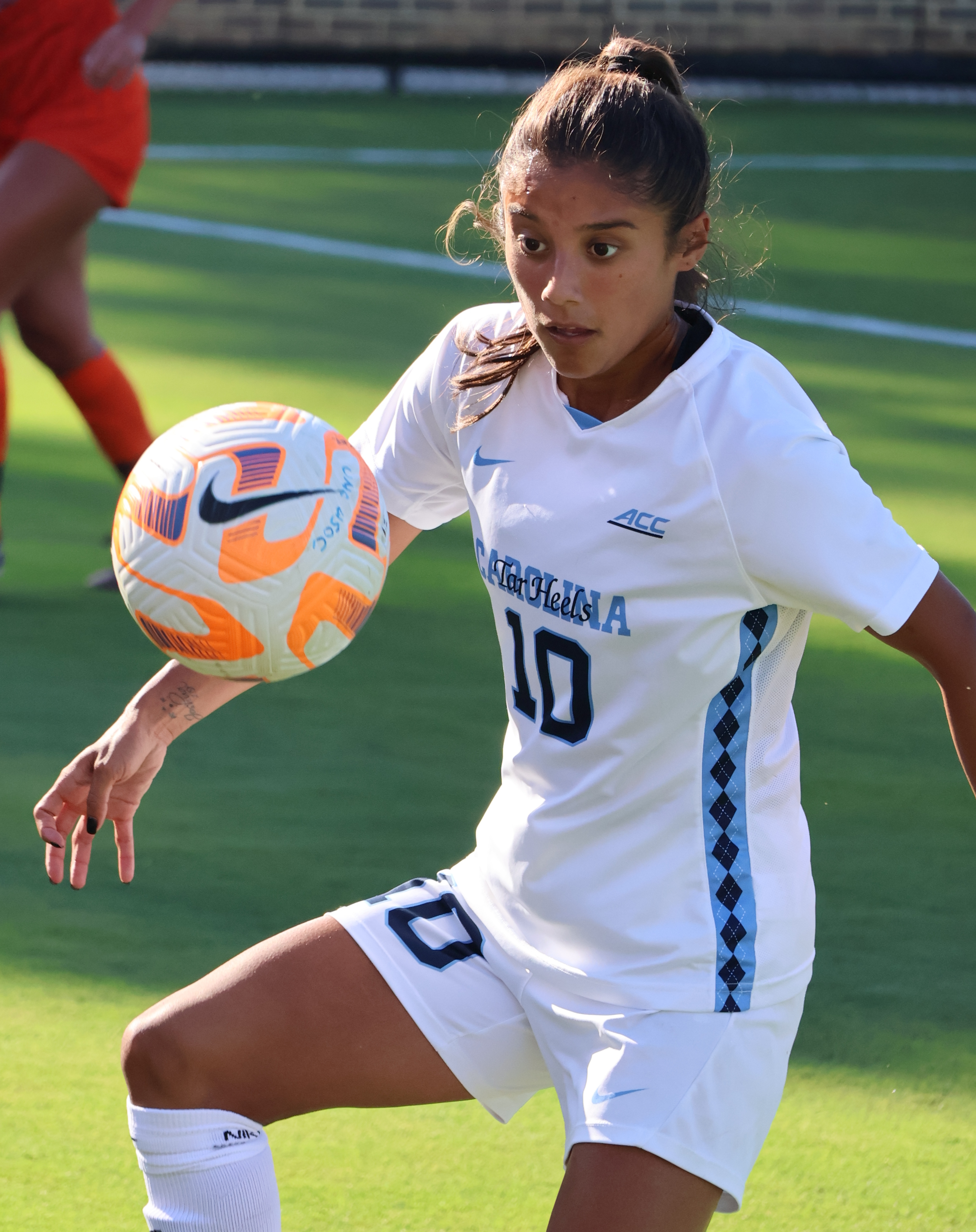
Meza playing for North Carolina in 2023

Meza was a four-year starter for the North Carolina Tar Heels. In her freshman season, which was abbreviated due to the COVID-19 pandemic in 2020, she scored 2 goals with 5 assists in 19 games, being named to the All-ACC third team and ACC all-freshman team. North Carolina reached the semifinals of the NCAA tournament, where she assisted Brianna Pinto in a 3–1 loss to Santa Clara. In her sophomore season in 2021, she had 2 goals and 1 assist in 16 games, including a golden goal against Arkansas, and was named to the All-ACC second team.

Meza played through minor shin splints during her junior season in 2022, recording 2 goals and 4 assists in 16 games, and was named first-team All-ACC and third-team All-American. She was forced to miss the NCAA tournament due to injury as North Carolina made the championship game, losing to UCLA. She had 1 goal in 21 games and earned second-team All-ACC honors in her senior season in 2023, helping North Carolina to the quarterfinals of the NCAA tournament. Head coach Anson Dorrance nicknamed her "Mighty Mouse" for her defensive prowess.

== Club career ==
=== Seattle Reign ===
Seattle Reign FC selected Meza with the 17th overall pick in the second round of the 2024 NWSL Draft; Seattle traded up for the pick by sending US$125,000 in allocation funds to the Chicago Red Stars. She was signed to a one-year contract with an option to extend for another year. She initially struggled to adjust to the professional environment and made only two appearances for the Reign, both in the 2024 NWSL x Liga MX Femenil Summer Cup, during her rookie season.

==== Dallas Trinity (loan) ====
In July, Dallas Trinity general manager Chris Petrucelli reached out to Meza with an offer for minutes on loan in the new USL Super League. On August 1, the Reign picked up Meza's second-year contract option and announced that she would join Trinity for the rest of the year for an undisclosed fee. She appeared in the starting lineup of Trinity's inaugural game on August 18, a 1–1 draw against the Tampa Bay Sun. On September 7, she scored her first professional goal – and Trinity's first at home at the Cotton Bowl – which leveled a 1–1 draw against DC Power FC. On November 24, she scored three minutes into a 1–0 win against the Carolina Ascent. She was named the USL Super League Player of the Month for November. She recorded 2 goals and 1 assist in 13 appearances, helping Dallas to second place in the standings at the winter break.

==== Return to Seattle ====
Seattle head coach Laura Harvey said Meza's spell in Dallas contributed to her maturation as a professional athlete. After returning to Seattle, Meza made her NWSL regular-season debut on March 15, 2025, coming on as a stoppage-time substitute for Ji So-yun in the season opener against Gotham FC. She quickly became a regular starter for the Reign. On April 26, she registered her first NWSL assist with a cross to Jordyn Huitema's header during a 1–1 draw with Bay FC. On May 17, she set up Maddie Dahlien, her former college teammate, to score the only goal of the game against Racing Louisville. On June 30, the Reign announced that Meza had signed a new contract with the team through the 2028 season.

== International career ==
Meza began training with the United States national under-15 team in 2015. She scored six goals as part of the team that shut out all seven of its opponents to win the 2016 CONCACAF Girls' U-15 Championship. She played regularly for the under-17 team, including on the winning side at the 2018 CONCACAF Women's U-17 Championship. She helped the under-20 team win the 2020 CONCACAF Women's U-20 Championship and was poised to make the roster for the 2020 FIFA U-20 Women's World Cup, but the tournament was cancelled due to the COVID-19 pandemic. She played friendlies for the under-23 team in 2022 and 2025.

Emma Hayes gave Meza her first senior national team call-up in June 2025. She made her senior international debut on June 29, starting and playing 87 minutes of the 4–0 friendly win over the Republic of Ireland.

== Career statistics ==
=== Club summary ===
As of December 14, 2024

Club	Season	League			Cup		Playoffs (Note: Includes NWSL Playoffs)		Other		Total	
Club	Season	Division	Apps	Goals	Apps	Goals	Apps	Goals	Apps	Goals	Apps	Goals
Seattle Reign	2024	NWSL	0	0	—		0	0	2 (Note: Appearances in NWSL x Liga MX Femenil Summer Cup)	0	2	0
Dallas Trinity FC (loan)	2024–25	USL Super League	13	2	—		0	0	—		13	2
Career total			13	2	0	0	0	0	2	0	15	2

=== International ===
As of match played January 27, 2026

National Team	Year	Apps	Goals
United States	2025	2	0
United States	2026	1	0
Total		3	0

== Honors ==
Individual

- USL Super League Player of the Month, November 2024
- USL Super League Team of the Month, November 2024
- Third-team United Soccer Coaches All-American: 2022
- All-ACC: 2022 (first team), 2021 and 2023 (second team), 2020 (third team)
- ACC all-freshman team: 2020
