= Gabriela Guillén =

Costa Rican footballer (born 1992)

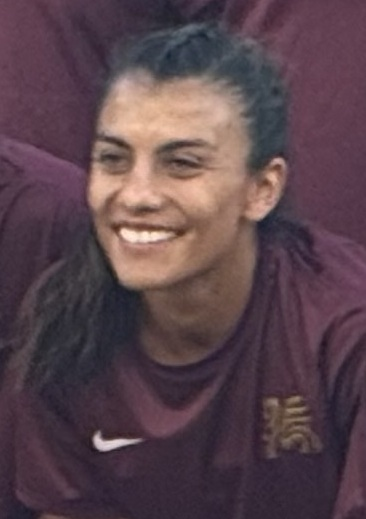
- Guillén with Dallas Trinity in 2024

Personal information
- Full name: Gabriela Guillén Álvarez
- Date of birth: 1 March 1992 (age 34)
- Place of birth: Tibás, Costa Rica
- Height: 1.57 m (5 ft 2 in)
- Position: Defender

College career
Years	Team	Apps	(Gls)
2009–2013	Creighton Bluejays		

Senior career*
Years	Team	Apps	(Gls)
2013–2019	Saprissa FF	–	(–)
2020	Þór/KA	12	(0)
2020–2024	Alajuelense FF	–	(–)
2024–2025	Dallas Trinity	7	(0)
2024	→ Houston Dash	0	(0)

International career^{‡}
2007–2008	Costa Rica U17	6	(0)
2009–2011	Costa Rica U20	4	(0)
2012–	Costa Rica	88	(2)
Medal record
Women's football
Representing Costa Rica
Pan American Games
Bronze medal – third place	2019 Lima	Team
- * Club domestic league appearances and goals as of 1 July 2025 ‡ National team caps and goals as of 00:36, 30 October 2024 (UTC)

Gabriela Guillén Álvarez (born 1 March 1992) is a Costa Rican professional footballer who plays as a defender for the Costa Rica national team.

== Professional career ==
Guillén has played football for clubs in Costa Rica and Iceland. Since 2020, she has played for Alajuelense Fútbol Femenino. Guillén began her career with Alajuelense's city rivals Saprissa Fútbol Femenino, and played one season with Icelandic Úrvalsdeild kvenna club Þór/KA.

=== Dallas Trinity FC, 2024–2025 ===
In July 2024, Guillén signed with Dallas Trinity FC.

==== Loan to Houston Dash ====
On September 21, 2024, Guillén and teammate Gracie Brian, signed for NWSL club Houston Dash on a short-term loan agreement.

== International career ==
Gabriela played for Costa Rica against the United States in 2012.

Guillén has participated in under-17 and under-20 World Cups with Costa Rica, playing two matches in FIFA U-17 Women's World Cup New Zealand 2008 against Ghana and Germany, and playing no matches in the FIFA U-20 Women's World Cup Germany 2010.

In 2014 she was part of the Costa Rican team that qualified for the first time to a senior world cup, in this case the 2015 FIFA Women's World Cup, in which then she participated in one match against Spain.

She was also part of the Costa Rica Women's National Football Team that won a silver medal in the 2018 Central American and Caribbean Games. Later that same year, she was called to play with Costa Rica in the 2019 FIFA Women's World Cup qualification, which Costa Rica failed to qualify.

== Personal ==
Guillén married her partner of ten years in April 2023.
