= 2024–25 Fort Lauderdale United FC season =

Inaugural Fort Lauderdale United FC season

Fort Lauderdale United FC
2024–25 season
- General Manager: Aly Hassan
- Head Coach: Tyrone Mears
- Stadium: Beyond Bancard Field
- USL Super League: 3rd
- USLS Playoffs: Finals
- Top goalscorer: Addie McCain (10 goals)
- Highest home attendance: 4,316
- Lowest home attendance: 1,957
- Average home league attendance: 2,306
- Biggest win: 2–0 (vs DC, September 13, 2024); 3–1 (vs LEX, September 22, 2024); 2–0 (vs CAR, December 14, 2024); 3–1 (vs LEX, February 22, 2025); 3–1 (vs BKFC, March 15, 2025)
- Biggest defeat: 2–5 (vs CAR, April 26, 2025); 1–4 (vs BKFC, May 3, 2025)
- All statistics correct as of 3 May 2025.

The 2024–25 Fort Lauderdale United FC season was the team's inaugural season as a professional women's soccer team, being one of the eight charter clubs in the USL Super League (USLS), one of two leagues to be in the top tier of women's soccer in the United States.

The club made it to the inaugural USL Super League final, winning via a goal away in stoppage time during added extra time against Carolina Ascent FC. However, the club lost in extra time to the champions Tampa Bay Sun FC.

== Players and staff ==
=== Current roster ===
As of 16 March 2025* Note: Flags indicate national team as defined under FIFA eligibility rules; some limited exceptions apply. Players may hold more than one non-FIFA nationality.

No.	Pos.	Nation	Player
1	GK	USA	Cosette Morché
2	DF	USA	Delaney Lindahl
3	DF	USA	Sheyenne Allen
4	DF	USA	Celia Gaynor
5	DF	TGA	Laveni Vaka
6	MF	RSA	Anele Komani
7	MF	BER	Nia Christopher
8	MF	USA	Felicia Knox
9	FW	USA	Jorian Baucom
10	FW	BRA	Érica Gomes
11	FW	USA	Sh'Nia Gordon
12	MF	USA	Darya Rajaee
15	DF	USA	Adrienne Jordan
16	FW	USA	Anna Henderson

No.	Pos.	Nation	Player
17	FW	USA	Jasmine Hamid
18	MF	USA	Addie McCain
19	DF	USA	Cameron Brooks
20	DF	USA	Kiara Locklear
21	FW	USA	Tatiana Fung
22	FW	ISL	Thelma Hermannsdóttir
23	MF	USA	Taylor Smith
24	DF	USA	Reese Klein
25	DF	CAN	Sabrina McNeill
27	DF	USA	Julia Grosso
28	DF	USA	Laurel Ansbrow
32	GK	USA	Erin McKinney
43	GK	USA	Makenna Gottschalk

=== Staff ===
As of September 9, 2024*

Front office
Position	Name
Chairman & Founder	Tommy Smith
Technical staff
Head Coach	Tyrone Mears
Associate Head Coach	Ali Rogers
Operations & Player Affairs	Emilia Ryjewski
Head Athletic Trainer	Mackenzi Booth
Performance Coach	Jeff Duarte
Goalkeeper Coach	Aaron Ingham

== Competitions ==
=== Friendlies ===
February 26, 2025	Fort Lauderdale United FC	v	NJ/NY Gotham FC	Davie, Florida
7:00 p.m. ET				Stadium: Beyond Bancard Stadium

=== Regular season ===
==== Results summary ====
Overall								Home						Away					
Pld	W	D	L	GF	GA	GD	Pts	W	D	L	GF	GA	GD	W	D	L	GF	GA	GD
27	10	9	8	34	33	+1	39	6	4	4	17	17	0	4	5	4	17	16	+1

Last updated: May 31, 2025.
Source: USLSuperLeague.com

==== Regular season standings ====
Pos	Team	Pld	W	L	T	GF	GA	GD	Pts	Qualification
2	Tampa Bay Sun (C)	28	12	6	10	42	28	+14	46	Playoffs
3	Dallas Trinity	28	12	9	7	42	30	+12	43	Playoffs
4	Fort Lauderdale United	28	11	8	9	35	33	+2	42 (Note: Head-to-head points: Fort Lauderdale 6, Spokane 3)	Playoffs
5	Spokane Zephyr	28	11	8	9	37	32	+5	42	
6	Brooklyn	28	10	9	9	30	34	−4	39	

Source: USL Super League
Rules for classification: 1) head-to-head points; 2) total goal differential; 3) total goals scored; 4) disciplinary points; 5) drawing of lots.
(C) Champions

==== Matches ====
August 17, 2024 1	Spokane Zephyr FC	1–1	Fort Lauderdale United FC	Spokane, Washington
6:00 p.m. PDT	Emina Ekic 17' (pen.); Taylor Aylmer (yellow card) 32'; Emina Ekic (yellow card) 69'; Alyssa Bourgeois (yellow card) 79'	Report	Sheyenne Allen (yellow card) 20'; Addie McCain 72'	Stadium: One Spokane Stadium; Attendance: 4,868; Referee: Rebecca Pagan

September 6, 2024 2	Carolina Ascent FC	2–1	Fort Lauderdale United FC	Charlotte, North Carolina
7:30 PM ET	Guion 26'; Corbin (yellow card) 28'; Aguilera 68'; DeMarco (yellow card) 70'; Harding (yellow card) 77'	Report	Hamid 90'	Stadium: American Legion Memorial Stadium; Attendance: 3,251; Referee: Shawn Tehini

September 13, 2024 3	DC Power FC	0–2	Fort Lauderdale United FC	Washington, D.C.
7:30 PM EST	Duong (yellow card) 41'; Friedrichs (yellow card) 80'; Wolfbauer (yellow card) 90'	Report	McCain 9'; Hamid 39'	Stadium: Audi Field; Attendance: 4,719; Referee: Adorae Monroy

September 22, 2024 4	Lexington SC	1–3	Fort Lauderdale United FC	Lexington, Kentucky
4:00 PM EST	Shepherd (yellow card) 37', (goal) 59'; Weeks (yellow card) 45+4'	Report	McCain 22', 57', 90' (pen.); Gordon (yellow card) 49'; Komani (yellow card) 81'; Gourley (yellow card) 83'	Stadium: Lexington SC Stadium; Attendance: 3,946; Referee: Iryna Petrunok

September 29, 2024 5	Fort Lauderdale United FC	v	Dallas Trinity FC	Davie, Florida
				Stadium: FTL UTD Stadium
Note: Match was rescheduled to December 1, 2024 due to construction issues at Training Facility at Nova Southeastern University

October 6, 2024 6	Fort Lauderdale United FC	1–0	Brooklyn FC	Davie, Florida
7:30 PM EST	Klein 82'	Report	Hill (yellow card) 89'	Stadium: FTL UTD Stadium; Attendance: 4,316; Referee: Jamie Padilla

October 12, 2024 7	Tampa Bay Sun FC	v	Fort Lauderdale United FC	Tampa, Florida
				Stadium: Riverfront Stadium
Note: Postponed due to Hurricane Milton

October 19, 2024 8	Fort Lauderdale United FC	1–2	Lexington SC	Davie, Florida
7:30 PM EST	McCain 22'; Komani (yellow card) 59'	Report	Parsons 37', 71'	Stadium: FTL UTD Stadium; Attendance: 2,139; Referee: Melinda Sopka Homa

October 27, 2024 9	Brooklyn FC	3–1	Fort Lauderdale United FC	New York, New York
2:00 PM EST	Pickard (yellow card) 11'; Kroeger 28'; Scheriff 31'; George 57'; Pantuso (yellow card) 87'; Pluck (yellow card) 89'	Report	Hamid (yellow card) 31'; Knox 71'	Stadium: Commisso Soccer Stadium; Attendance: 411; Referee: Thomas Snyder
Note: Match originally scheduled for October 26, 2024 but changed due to field issues at Maimonides Park.

November 2, 2024 10	Dallas Trinity FC	1–0	Fort Lauderdale United FC	Dallas, Texas
5:00 PM EST	Brooks (yellow card) 45+3'; Meza (yellow card) 83'; Strawn 87'	Report	Hamid (yellow card) 79'; Gomes (yellow card) 90+1'	Stadium: Cotton Bowl; Attendance: 3,130; Referee: Natalie Simon

November 10, 2024 11	Fort Lauderdale United FC	1–1	Tampa Bay Sun FC	Davie, Florida
5:00 PM EST	Taylor Smith (yellow card) 75'; Henderson 90+3'	Report	Giammona 17'; Moore (yellow card) 60'	Stadium: FTL UTD Stadium; Attendance: 1,976; Referee: Adorae Monroy

November 23, 2024 12	Fort Lauderdale United FC	0–1	DC Power FC	Davie, Florida
7:30 PM EST		Report	Constant (yellow card) 60'; Bagley 90+2'	Stadium: Beyond Bancard Field; Attendance: 1,970; Referee: Gerald Flores

December 1, 2024 5	Fort Lauderdale United FC	2–1	Dallas Trinity FC	Davie, Florida
7:30 PM EST	Hamid 2' (yellow card) 62'; Fung (yellow card) 49'; McCain 81'	Report	Brooks (yellow card) 58'; Thornton 68'	Stadium: FTL UTD Stadium; Attendance: 1,957; Referee: Elton Garcia
Note: Match was originally scheduled for September 29, 2024 but was postponed due to construction issues at FTL UTD Stadium

December 7, 2024 13	Fort Lauderdale United FC	2–1	Spokane Zephyr FC	Davie, Florida
7:30 PM EST	McCain 9'; Allen 84'; Pralle (yellow card) 87'	Report	Rouse 90+1'	Stadium: FTL UTD Stadium; Attendance: 1,965; Referee: Shawn Tehini

December 14, 2024 14	Fort Lauderdale United FC	2–0	Carolina Ascent FC	Davie, Florida
7:30 PM EST	Locklear 54', 87'; Vaka (yellow card) 74'; Komani (yellow card) 90+2'	Report	Bruce (yellow card) 73'	Stadium: FTL UTD Stadium; Attendance: 2,078; Referee: Lorenzo Hernandez

February 8, 2025 7	Tampa Bay Sun FC	2–2	Fort Lauderdale United FC	Tampa, Florida
6:00 PM EST	Almendariz (yellow card) 41'; Giammona 71' (pen.); Fløe 90+5' (pen.)	Report	Gordon (yellow card) 43', (goal) 59'; Hamid 54'; Locklear (yellow card) 77'; Vaka (yellow card) 85'	Stadium: Riverfront Stadium; Attendance: 2,990; Referee: Jaclyn Metz

February 22, 2025 15	Fort Lauderdale United FC	2–0	Lexington SC	Davie, Florida
7:30 PM ET	McCain 49'; Hamid 62'; Lindahl (yellow card) 86'; Vaka (yellow card) 90+4'	Report	Winter (yellow card) 30'	Stadium: FTL UTD Stadium; Attendance: 2,624; Referee: Brad Jensen

March 2, 2025 16	Carolina Ascent FC	1–2	Fort Lauderdale United FC	Charlotte, North Carolina
3:00 PM EST	Porter (yellow card) 25'; Corbin 28'; Parker (yellow card) 65'	Report	Hamid 47'; Locklear 61'; Rajaee (yellow card) 62'; Baucom (yellow card) 82'; Vaka (yellow card) 89'	Stadium: American Legion Memorial Stadium; Attendance: 3,044; Referee: Laura Rodriguez

March 8, 2025 17	Fort Lauderdale United FC	1–1	Tampa Bay Sun FC	Davie, Florida
7:30 PM EST	Hamid 8'; McCain (yellow card) 12'; Baucom (yellow card) 68'	Report	Fløe 32'; Bessette (yellow card) 68'	Stadium: FTL UTD Stadium; Attendance: 2,260; Referee: Adorae Monroy

March 15, 2025 18	Brooklyn FC	0–2	Fort Lauderdale United FC	New York, New York
6:00 PM EST	coach (yellow card) 78'	Report	Gordon 32', 67'; Gaynor (yellow card) 90+1'; Baucom (yellow card) 90+4'	Stadium: Maimonides Park; Attendance: 2,000; Referee: Iryna Petrunok

March 22, 2025 19	Fort Lauderdale United FC	0–0	Spokane Zephyr FC	Davie, Florida
7:30 PM EST	Gaynor (yellow card) 9'; Lindahl (yellow card) 50'	Report		Stadium: FTL UTD Stadium; Attendance: 2,070; Referee: Marie Durr

April 5, 2025 20	Tampa Bay Sun FC	2–0	Fort Lauderdale United FC	Tampa, Florida
6:00 PM EST	Listro 31'; Tankersley 80'	Report	Locklear (yellow card) 60'; Lindahl (yellow card) 79'	Stadium: Riverfront Stadium; Attendance: 2,708; Referee: Laura Rodriguez

April 12, 2025 21	Fort Lauderdale United FC	1–1	DC Power FC	Davie, Florida
7:30 PM EST	Hamid (yellow card) 26' (goal) 50'; Locklear (yellow card) 60'	Report	Constant (yellow card) 38'; Gourley 46'; Estcourt (yellow card) 90+8'	Stadium: FTL UTD Stadium; Attendance: 2,173; Referee: Alejo Calume

April 19, 2025 22	Dallas Trinity FC	1–1	Fort Lauderdale United FC	Dallas, Texas
5:00 PM EST	Thornton 3'; Abiodun (yellow card) 33'; Brooks (yellow card) 86'	Report	Locklear 35'; McCain (yellow card) 69'; McNeill (yellow card) 88'	Stadium: Cotton Bowl; Attendance: 3,536; Referee: Rachel Swett

April 26, 2025 23	Fort Lauderdale United FC	2–5	Carolina Ascent FC	Davie, Florida
7:30 PM EST	Hamid 3'; McCain 90+2'	Report	Corbin 5', 81' (pen.); Harding 17', 77' (yellow card) 45+1'; Troccoli 34'	Stadium: FTL UTD Stadium; Attendance: 2,215; Referee: Alex Beehler

May 3, 2025 24	Fort Lauderdale United FC	1–4	Brooklyn FC	Davie, Florida
7:30 PM EST	Gordon 26'; Brooks (yellow card) 30'; Smith (yellow card) 45'; Ansbrow (yellow card) 55'	Report	Garziano 19'; Kelly 56'; Breslin 59'; Brooks 61' (o.g.)	Stadium: FTL UTD Stadium; Attendance: 2,231; Referee: John Matto

May 16, 2025 25	Lexington SC	0–1	Fort Lauderdale United FC	Lexington, Kentucky
7:00 PM EST		Report	Aalbue 17' (o.g.); Locklear (yellow card) 58'; Ansbrow (yellow card) 90+1'; McCain (yellow card) 90+4'	Stadium: Lexington SC Stadium; Attendance: 1,015; Referee: Nabil Bensalah

May 20, 2025 26	DC Power FC	1–1	Fort Lauderdale United FC	Washington D.C.
7:30 PM EST	Yango (yellow card) 18'; Abera 45'	Report	McCain (yellow card) 6'; Locklear (yellow card) 46'; McNeill 83'	Stadium: Audi Field; Attendance: 2,095; Referee: Danielle Chesky

May 24, 2025 27	Fort Lauderdale United FC	1–0	Dallas Trinity FC	Davie, Florida
7:30 PM EST	Locklear 26' (yellow card) 28'; Cameron Brooks (yellow card) 71'	Report	Strawn (yellow card) 16'	Stadium: FTL UTD Stadium; Attendance: 2,554; Referee: Shawn Tehini

May 31, 2025 28	Spokane Zephyr FC	1–1	Fort Lauderdale United FC	Spokane, Washington
9:00 PM EST	Cook 10'; Aylmer (yellow card) 24'; Bourgeois (yellow card) 88'	Report	Gordon 8'; Allen (yellow card) 21'; Ansbrow (yellow card) 83'; Rajaee (yellow card) 90+1'	Stadium: One Spokane Stadium; Attendance: Adorae Monroy; Referee: 3,596

=== Playoffs ===
June 8, 2025	Carolina Ascent FC	1–2 (a.e.t.)	Fort Lauderdale United FC	Charlotte, North Carolina
	González 55'	Report	Locklear 68', 120'	Stadium: American Legion Memorial Stadium; Attendance: 5,539; Referee: Alexandra Billeter

June 14, 2025 Final	Tampa Bay Sun FC	1–0	Fort Lauderdale United FC	Tampa
6:30 PM				Stadium: Riverfront Stadium; Attendance: 5,006; Referee: Danielle Chesky

== Statistics ==
=== Appearances ===
As of match played June 14, 2025

No.	Player	Nat.	Total		Regular Season		Playoffs	
No.	Player	Nat.	Apps	Starts	Apps	Starts	Apps	Starts
Goalkeepers
1	Cosette Morché	(United States)	24	24	22	22	2	2
32	Erin McKinney	(United States)	0	0	0	0	0	0
43	Makenna Gottschalk	(United States)	5	4	5	4	0	0
Defenders
2	Delaney Lindahl	(United States)	12	10	12	10	0	0
3	Sheyenne Allen	(United States)	14	6	13	6	1	0
4	Celia Gaynor	(United States)	22	16	21	16	1	0
5	Laveni Vaka	(Tonga)	18	18	18	18	0	0
15	Adrienne Jordan	(United States)	16	14	16	14	0	0
19	Cameron Brooks	(United States)	19	14	17	12	2	2
25	Sabrina McNeil	(United States)	17	15	15	13	2	2
27	Julia Grosso	(United States)	7	7	5	5	2	2
28	Laurel Ansbrow	(United States)	17	17	15	15	2	2
Midfielders
6	Anele Komani	(England)	13	5	11	5	2	0
7	Nia Christopher	(Bermuda)	13	1	13	1	0	0
8	Felicia Knox	(United States)	26	18	26	18	0	0
12	Darya Rajaee	(United States)	27	21	25	19	2	2
18	Addie McCain	(United States)	30	30	28	28	2	2
20	Kiara Locklear	(United States)	18	16	16	14	2	2
21	Tatiana Fung	(United States)	21	4	19	4	2	0
23	Taylor Smith	(United States)	29	24	27	22	2	2
Forwards
9	Jorian Baucom	(United States)	16	0	14	0	2	0
10	Érica Gomes	(Brazil)	6	2	6	2	0	0
11	Sh'Nia Gordon	(United States)	30	30	28	28	2	2
16	Anna Henderson	(United States)	8	0	8	0	0	0
17	Jasmine Hamid	(United States)	28	26	26	24	2	2
22	Thelma Hermannsdóttir	(Iceland)	9	0	8	0	1	0
Other players (Departed during season)
14	Gianna Gourley	(United States)	23	15	23	15	0	0
24	Reese Klein	(United States)	6	1	6	1	0	0
31	Heather Hinz	(United States)	2	2	2	2	0	0

=== Goals ===
No.	Nat.	Name	Regular season	Playoffs	Total
18	(United States)	Addie McCain	10	0	10
17	(United States)	Jasmine Hamid	9	0	9
20	(United States)	Kiara Locklear	5	2	7
11	(United States)	Sh'Nia Gordon	5	0	5
3	(United States)	Sheyenne Allen	1	0	1
16	(United States)	Anna Henderson	1	0	1
19	(United States)	Reese Klein	1	0	1
14	(United States)	Felicia Knox	1	0	1
25	(United States)	Sabrina McNeill	1	0	1
Own goals			1	0	1
Total			33	2	35

=== Assists ===
No.	Nat.	Name	Regular Season	Playoffs	Total
20	(United States)	Kiara Locklear	5	0	5
14	(United States)	Felicia Knox	3	0	3
17	(United States)	Jasmine Hamid	2	0	2
11	(United States)	Sh'Nia Gordon	3	1	4
18	(United States)	Addie McCain	2	0	2
28	(United States)	Laurel Ansbrow	2	0	2
19	(United States)	Cameron Brooks	2	0	2
7	(Bermuda)	Nia Christopher	1	0	1
25	(United States)	Sabrina McNeil	1	0	1
27	(United States)	Julia Grosso	0	1	1
Total			18	2	20

=== Clean sheets ===
No.	Nat.	Name	Regular Season	Playoffs	Total
1	(United States)	Cosette Morché	7	0	7
Total			7	0	7

=== Disciplinary cards ===
Player			Regular Season			Playoffs			Total		
No.	Nat.	Name	Booked	(yellow card) (yellow-red card)	Sent off (straight red)	Booked	(yellow card) (yellow-red card)	Sent off (straight red)	Booked	(yellow card) (yellow-red card)	Sent off (straight red)
5	(Tonga)	Laveni Vaka	4	0	0	0	0	0	4	0	0
9	(United States)	Jorian Baucom	4	0	0	0	0	0	4	0	0
17	(United States)	Jasmine Hamid	4	0	0	0	0	0	4	0	0
22	(United States)	Kiara Locklear	6	0	0	0	0	0	6	0	0
6	(England)	Anele Komani	3	0	0	1	0	0	4	0	0
11	(United States)	Sh'Nia Gordon	3	0	0	1	0	0	4	0	0
2	(United States)	Delaney Lindahl	3	0	0	0	0	0	3	0	0
23	(United States)	Taylor Smith	3	0	0	0	0	0	3	0	0
4	(United States)	Celia Gaynor	2	0	0	0	0	0	2	0	0
3	(United States)	Sheyenne Allen	2	0	0	0	0	0	2	0	0
14	(United States)	Gianna Gourley	1	0	0	0	0	0	1	0	0
10	(Brazil)	Érica Gomes	1	0	0	0	0	0	1	0	0
21	(United States)	Tatiana Fung	1	0	0	0	0	0	1	0	0
12	(United States)	Darya Rajaee	2	0	0	0	0	0	2	0	0
18	(United States)	Addie McCain	3	0	0	1	0	0	4	0	0
25	(United States)	Sabrina McNeill	1	0	0	0	0	0	1	0	0
28	(United States)	Laurel Ansbrow	3	0	0	0	0	0	3	0	0
19	(United States)	Cameroon Brooks	2	0	0	1	0	0	3	0	0
20	(United States)	Kiara Locklear	1	0	0	1	0	0	2	0	0
Total			46	0	0	5	0	0	51	0	0
