= 2025 USL Super League final =

Soccer championship game

- Event: USL Super League final
| Tampa Bay Sun FC | Fort Lauderdale United FC |
| 1 | 0 |
- Date: June 14, 2025
- Venue: Riverfront Stadium, Tampa, Florida, U.S.
- MVP: Sydny Nasello (Tampa Bay Sun FC)
- Referee: Danielle Chesky
- Attendance: 5,006

The 2025 USL Super League final was the inaugural championship match of the USL Super League, a top-division professional soccer league in the United States, and took place on June 14, 2025. It was contested between Tampa Bay Sun FC and Fort Lauderdale United FC to determine the champion of the inaugural 2024–25 season. Tampa Bay won 1–0 at their home Riverfront Stadium.

== Road to the final ==
=== Tampa Bay Sun ===
Tampa Bay Sun FC finished second in the standings in the USL Super League's inaugural season. They were led by USL Super League All-League honorees Sydny Nasello, Natasha Flint, Vivianne Bessette, and Cecilie Fløe. In the playoff semifinals, goals scored by Flint and Carlee Giammona led the Sun to a 2–1 win over the third seed Dallas Trinity FC.

=== Fort Lauderdale United ===
Fort Lauderdale United FC finished fourth in the inaugural standings. They were led by All-League honorees Addie McCain, Jasmine Hamid, and Laveni Vaka, but the latter suffered a season-ending knee injury before the playoffs. In the playoff semifinals, two goals from midseason signing Kiara Locklear led United to a 2–1 win over the Players' Shield champion Carolina Ascent FC, with an extra-time game winner that may have been wrongly ruled onside.

== Match ==
=== Details ===
June 14, 2025
7:30 PM EDT

| Tampa Bay Sun | 1–0 (a.e.t.) | Fort Lauderdale United |
|---|---|---|
| Fløe 100' | Report |

Riverfront Stadium, Tampa, Florida
Attendance: 5,006
Referee: Danielle Chesky

| Tampa Bay Sun FC | Fort Lauderdale United FC |

| GK | 28 | (United States) Ashley Orkus |
| LB | 22 | (United States) Paige Almendariz |
| CB | 15 | (United States) Brooke Hendrix |
| CB | 4 | (Canada) Vivianne Bessette |
| RB | 20 | (Norway) Victoria Haugen | | (substituted off) 86' |
| DM | 12 | (England) Jade Moore | | (substituted off) 90+1' |
| DM | 5 | (United States) Jordyn Listro (c) | (yellow card) 90+3' |
| AM | 19 | (United States) Carlee Giammona | | (substituted off) 67' |
| FW | 9 | (England) Natasha Flint | (yellow card) 113' |
| FW | 13 | (Denmark) Cecilie Fløe | (yellow card) 106' | (substituted off) 120' |
| FW | 35 | (United States) Sydny Nasello | | (substituted off) 120' |
Substitutes:
| GK | 31 | (Jamaica) Sydney Schneider |
| MF | 3 | (United States) Gabby Provenzano | | (substituted in) 90+1' |
| FW | 8 | (United States) Hannah Keane | | (substituted in) 120' |
| FW | 11 | (United States) Parker Goins | | (substituted in) 86' |
| FW | 24 | (United States) Ashley Clark | | (substituted in) 120' |
| MF | 29 | (Iceland) Andrea Hauksdóttir |
| DF | 37 | (United States) Jordan Zade | | (substituted in) 67' |
Manager:
(Canada) Denise Schilte-Brown

| GK | 1 | (United States) Cosette Morché |
| LB | 25 | (United States) Sabrina McNeill |
| CB | 19 | (United States) Cameron Brooks | (yellow card) 89' |
| CB | 28 | (United States) Laurel Ansbrow |
| RB | 27 | (United States) Julia Grosso | | (substituted off) 99' |
| MF | 23 | (United States) Taylor Smith | | (substituted off) 77' |
| MF | 12 | (United States) Darya Rajaee | | (substituted off) 105' |
| MF | 18 | (United States) Addie McCain (c) | (yellow card) 113' |
| FW | 17 | (United States) Jasmine Hamid | | (substituted off) 82' |
| FW | 20 | (United States) Kiara Locklear | (yellow card) 45+3' |
| FW | 11 | (United States) Sh'Nia Gordon | (yellow card) 103' |
Substitutes:
| GK | 32 | (United States) Erin McKinney |
| DF | 2 | (United States) Delaney Lindahl |
| DF | 4 | (United States) Celia Gaynor | | (substituted in) 105' |
| MF | 6 | (England) Anele Komani | | (substituted in) 77' |
| FW | 9 | (United States) Jorian Baucom | (substituted in) 82' |
| MF | 21 | (United States) Tatiana Fung | | (substituted in) 105' |
| MF | 22 | (Iceland) Thelma Hermannsdóttir | | (substituted in) 99' (substituted off) 105' |
Manager:
(England) Tyrone Mears

Most Valuable Player:
(United States) Sydny Nasello

Assistant referees:
Tiffini Turpin (United States)
Katarzyna Wasiak (United States)
Fourth official:
Adorae Monroy (United States)

Match rules

- 90 minutes.
- 30 minutes of extra time if necessary.
- Penalty shootout if scores still level.
- Maximum of five substitutions.
