= 2024–25 USL Super League season =

USL Super League
- Season: 2024–25
- Dates: August 17, 2024 – May 31, 2025 (regular season)
- Champion: Tampa Bay Sun FC
- Players' Shield: Carolina Ascent FC
- Matches: 112
- Goals: 286 (2.55 per match)
- Top goalscorer: Allie Thornton (13 goals)
- Biggest home win: DAL 6–0 BKFC (March 9, 2025)
- Biggest away win: LEX 0–4 CAR (March 23, 2025)
- Highest scoring: 8 goals: DAL 6–2 LEX (September 13, 2024)
- Longest winning run: 6 games: BKFC; CAR
- Longest unbeaten run: 11 games: CAR
- Longest winless run: 11 games: BKFC
- Longest losing run: 4 games: LEX
- Highest attendance: 10,553; CAR 1–0 DC (August 27, 2024)
- Lowest attendance: 211; BKFC 1–1 CAR (October 15, 2024)
- Total attendance: 278,521
- Average attendance: 2,487
- All statistics correct as of May 31, 2025.

The 2024–25 USL Super League (referred to as USLS) was the first season of the USL Super League, a top division of women's soccer in the United States. Eight teams competed in the inaugural season, which began on August 17, 2024. The league paused between mid-December and mid-February for a winter break and finished with the championship game on June 14, 2025, won by Tampa Bay Sun FC. The Players' Shield, won by the team with the best regular-season record, went to Carolina Ascent FC.

== Overview ==
=== Stadium issues and match rescheduling ===
Brooklyn FC's home opener, initially scheduled for August 31, 2024 against Carolina Ascent FC, was postponed due to issues identified during the installation of the turf at Maimonides Park, which left the field unplayable. On September 19, 2024, Brooklyn FC announced an agreement with Columbia University to host their seven fall home matches in 2024 at Rocco B. Commisso Soccer Stadium in Manhattan. As a result of the venue change, Brooklyn FC adjusted its home schedule.

Fort Lauderdale's home opener, originally scheduled against Dallas Trinity on September 29, 2024, was rescheduled to December 1, 2024, due to 'construction delays'.

DC Power FC rescheduled two of their home games.

=== Historic goals ===
The first goal in USL Super League history was scored by Vicky Bruce of Carolina Ascent in a match against DC Power FC on August 17, 2024. Dallas Trinity's Chioma Ubogagu recorded the league's first brace on September 13, 2024, in a home match against Lexington SC. In the same game, Allie Thornton became the first player to score a hat trick in league history, achieving a perfect hat trick.

== Teams ==
Locations of teams for the 2024-25 USL Super League season
Current club

=== Format ===
The 2024–25 USL Super League season featured eight teams competing in a balanced 28-game regular season, split into fall and spring schedules with a winter break. The teams played each other four times—twice at home and twice away—in a quadruple round-robin format. The top four teams advanced to the playoffs, culminating in three playoff games that determined the league champion.

=== Stadiums and locations ===
Note: Table lists in alphabetical order.

Team	Location	Stadium	Capacity
Brooklyn FC	Brooklyn, New York	Maimonides Park	7,000
Brooklyn FC	Manhattan, New York	Commisso Soccer Stadium (temporary)	3,500
Carolina Ascent FC	Charlotte, North Carolina	American Legion Memorial Stadium	10,500
Dallas Trinity FC	Dallas, Texas	Cotton Bowl Stadium	90,000
DC Power FC	Washington, D.C.	Audi Field	20,000
Fort Lauderdale United FC	Davie, Florida	Beyond Bancard Field	7,000
Lexington SC	Lexington, Kentucky	Lexington SC Stadium	7,500
Spokane Zephyr FC	Spokane, Washington	One Spokane Stadium	5,100
Tampa Bay Sun FC	Tampa, Florida	Riverfront Stadium	5,000

=== Personnel and kits ===
Team	Head coach	Captain(s)	Kit manufacturer	Shirt sponsor (front)	Shirt Sponsor (back)	Shirt sponsor (sleeve)	Shorts Sponsor
Brooklyn	(Brazil); Fabio Barros	(United States); Leah Scarpelli	(United States) Diaza	Liquid Death	None	TBA	None
Carolina Ascent	(England); Philip Poole	(United States); Taylor Porter	(United States) Capelli Sport	Nucor	Novant Health	Food Lion	None
Dallas Trinity	(Scotland); Pauline MacDonald	(United States); Amber Brooks	(United States) Nike	None	Relay; Human Cloud (2024–25) Trust & Will (2025)	El Rio Grande Latin Market	The Wine Group/Cupcake Vineyards
DC Power	(Cameroon); Phil Nana	(Haiti); Claire Constant	(United States) Capelli Sport	Agile Defense	None	None	None
Fort Lauderdale United	(England); Tyrone Mears	(United States); Darya Rajaee	(United States) Nike	Omega XL	La Croix	All Year Cooling	None
Lexington	(United States); Michael Dickey	(United States); Shea Moyer	(United States) Nike	UK HealthCare Sports Medicine	None	None	None
Spokane Zephyr	(United States); Jo Johnson	(United States); Taylor Aylmer	(United States) Capelli Sport	Davenport Hotel	Rosauers	Zappos	None
Tampa Bay Sun	(Canada); Denise; Schilte-Brown	(Canada); Jordyn Listro	(United States) Capelli Sport	Tampa; General Hospital	None	None	None

=== Managerial changes ===
Team	Outgoing manager	Manner of departure	Date of vacancy	Incoming manager	Date of appointment
Dallas Trinity	(United States) Chris Petrucelli (interim)	End of interim period	September 14, 2024	(Scotland) Pauline MacDonald	September 14, 2024
Brooklyn	(United States) Kristen Sample (interim)	End of interim period	September 23, 2024	(Canada) Jessica Silva	September 23, 2024
DC Power	(France) Frédéric Brillant	Relieved of duties	November 27, 2024	(Cameroon) Phil Nana	November 27, 2024
Lexington	(United States) Maren McCrary	Mutual departure	February 21, 2025	(United States) Michael Dickey	February 21, 2025
Brooklyn	(Canada) Jessica Silva	Relieved of duties	April 16, 2025	(Brazil) Fabio Barros	April 18, 2025

== League table ==
Pos	Team	Pld	W	L	T	GF	GA	GD	Pts	Qualification
1	Carolina Ascent (S)	28	13	6	9	45	24	+21	48	Playoffs
2	Tampa Bay Sun (C)	28	12	6	10	42	28	+14	46	Playoffs
3	Dallas Trinity	28	12	9	7	42	30	+12	43	Playoffs
4	Fort Lauderdale United	28	11	8	9	35	33	+2	42 (Note: Head-to-head points: Fort Lauderdale 6, Spokane 3)	Playoffs
5	Spokane Zephyr	28	11	8	9	37	32	+5	42	
6	Brooklyn	28	10	9	9	30	34	−4	39	
7	DC Power	28	5	14	9	24	41	−17	24	
8	Lexington	28	4	18	6	29	62	−33	18	

Source: USL Super League
Rules for classification: 1) head-to-head points; 2) total goal differential; 3) total goals scored; 4) disciplinary points; 5) drawing of lots.
(C) Champions; (S) Players' Shield winner

== Results ==
=== Fall ===
Home \ Away	BKN	CAR	DAL	DC	FTL	LEX	SPK	TB
Brooklyn	—	1–1	2–0	0–1	3–1	1–0	1–0	2–1
Carolina	2–0	—	0–1	1–0	2–1	1–1	0–0	0–0
Dallas	0–1	2–2	—	1–1	1–0	6–2	0–0	2–0
D.C.	0–3	0–1	0–0	—	0–2	2–1	2–2	0–3
Ft. Lauderdale	1–0	2–0	2–1	0–1	—	1–2	2–1	1–1
Lexington	0–3	1–1	2–3	3–0	1–3	—	1–1	2–3
Spokane	1–1	0–2	1–2	1–0	1–1	2–3	—	1–0
Tampa Bay	0–1	2–1	1–1	0–0	2–2	3–1	3–2	—

Updated to match(es) played on February 8, 2025. Source: USL Super League
Legend: Blue = home team win; Yellow = draw; Red = away team win.

=== Spring ===
Home \ Away	BKN	CAR	DAL	DC	FTL	LEX	SPK	TB
Brooklyn	—	0–0	0–3	0–1	0–2	1–1	2–2	2–2
Carolina	5–0	—	3–0	3–3	1–2	2–1	3–0	1–1
Dallas	6–0	2–1	—	1–0	1–1	3–1	0–1	1–1
D.C.	1–1	0–1	3–2	—	1–1	1–2	1–2	0–1
Ft. Lauderdale	1–4	2–5	1–0	1–1	—	2–0	0–0	1–1
Lexington	0–0	0–4	0–3	3–3	0–1	—	0–3	0–3
Spokane	1–0	1–2	3–0	3–2	1–1	2–0	—	3–2
Tampa Bay	1–1	1–0	1–0	2–0	2–0	4–1	1–2	—

Updated to match(es) played on May 31, 2025. Source: USL Super League
Legend: Blue = home team win; Yellow = draw; Red = away team win.

== Attendance ==
=== Average home attendances ===
As of 31 May 2025

Team	GP	Attendance	High	Low	Average
Carolina Ascent	14	56,411	10,553	1,817	4,032
Dallas Trinity	14	49,647	5,884	1,662	3,546
Tampa Bay Sun	14	44,563	5,248	2,401	3,183
Spokane Zephyr	14	35,512	5,086	2,013	2,537
Fort Lauderdale United	14	32,528	4,316	1,957	2,323
DC Power	14†	21,477	4,719	353	1,534
Lexington	14	21,429	3,946	476	1,531
Brooklyn	14	16,925	2,830	211	1,208
Total	112	278,521	10,553	211	2,487

Note: Ranked from highest to lowest average attendance
† - one result missing
‡ - two or more results missing

=== Highest attendances ===
Regular season
Rank	Home team	Score	Away team	Attendance	Date	Stadium
1	Carolina Ascent	1–0	DC Power	10,553	August 17, 2024	American Legion Memorial Stadium
2	Carolina Ascent	1–1	Tampa Bay Sun	6,304	May 17, 2025	American Legion Memorial Stadium
3	Dallas Trinity	2–1	Carolina Ascent	5,884	May 31, 2025	Cotton Bowl Stadium
4	Dallas Trinity	1–1	DC Power	5,835	September 7, 2024	Cotton Bowl Stadium
5	Tampa Bay Sun	1–1	Dallas Trinity	5,248	August 18, 2024	Riverfront Stadium
6	Spokane Zephyr	1–1	Fort Lauderdale United	5,086	August 17, 2024	One Spokane Stadium
7	Carolina Ascent	0–0	Spokane Zephyr	5,018	November 9, 2024	American Legion Memorial Stadium
8	Carolina Ascent	0–1	Dallas Trinity	4,953	November 23, 2024	American Legion Memorial Stadium
9	Dallas Trinity	6–0	Brooklyn	4,875	March 9, 2025	Cotton Bowl Stadium
10	Tampa Bay Sun	3–1	DC Power	4,810	April 26, 2025	Cotton Bowl Stadium

== Playoffs ==
The four-team playoffs consisted of single-legged semifinals and a final.

Semifinals
1	Carolina Ascent	1
4	Fort Lauderdale United (a.e.t.)	2
2	Tampa Bay Sun	2
3	Dallas Trinity	1

Championship
4	Fort Lauderdale United	0
2	Tampa Bay Sun (a.e.t.)	1

=== Semi-finals ===
June 7, 2025

Tampa Bay Sun	2–1	Dallas Trinity
Flint 36' (pen.); Giammona 59'	Report	Davison 17'

Riverfront Stadium, Tampa, Florida
Attendance: 3,038
Referee: Shawn Tehini
June 8, 2025

Carolina Ascent	1–2 (a.e.t.)	Fort Lauderdale United
González 55'	Report	Locklear 68', 120'

American Legion Memorial Stadium, Charlotte, North Carolina
Attendance: 5,539
Referee: Alexandra Billeter

=== Championship ===
June 14, 2025
7:30 PM EDT

Tampa Bay Sun	1–0 (a.e.t.)	Fort Lauderdale United
Fløe 100'	Report

Riverfront Stadium, Tampa, Florida
Attendance: 5,006
Referee: Danielle Chesky

== Statistical leaders ==
As of May 31, 2025

=== Goals ===
Rank	Player	Club	Goals
1	(United States) Allie Thornton	Dallas Trinity	13
2	(United States) Mia Corbin	Carolina Ascent	12
3	(Denmark) Cecilie Fløe	Tampa Bay Sun	11
4	(United States) Addie McCain	Fort Lauderdale United	10
4	(Bosnia and Herzegovina) Emina Ekić	Spokane Zephyr	10
6	(England) Natasha Flint	Tampa Bay Sun	9
6	(United States) Jasmine Hamid	Fort Lauderdale United	9
8	(United States) Carlee Giammona	Tampa Bay Sun	7
8	(United States) Gianna Gourley	DC Power	7
10	(United States) Jessica Garziano	Brooklyn	6
10	(United States) Madi Parsons	Lexington	6
10	(United States) Ally Cook	Spokane Zephyr	6

==== Hat-tricks ====
Player	For	Against	Result	Date
(United States) Allie Thornton^{P}	Dallas Trinity	Lexington	6–2 (H)	September 13, 2024
(United States) Addie McCain	Fort Lauderdale United	Lexington	1–3 (A)	September 22, 2024
(Brazil) Luana Grabias	Brooklyn	DC Power	0–3 (A)	November 13, 2024

P - Player scored a perfect hat-trick (one goal each with right foot, left foot and head)

==== Assists ====
Rank	Player	Club	Assists
1	(Puerto Rico) Jill Aguilera	Carolina Ascent	7
2	(Bosnia and Herzegovina) Emina Ekić	Spokane Zephyr	6
2	(England) Chioma Ubogagu	Dallas Trinity	6
4	(United States) Madi Parsons	Lexington	5
4	(United States) Maddy Perez	Lexington	5
4	(United States) Audrey Harding	Carolina Ascent	5
4	(United States) Shea Moyer	Lexington	5
4	(United States) Mackenzie George	Brooklyn	5
9	(United States) Mackenzie Pluck	Brooklyn	4
9	(United States) Taylor Porter	Carolina Ascent	4
9	(United States) Kiara Locklear	Fort Lauderdale United	4
9	(Denmark) Cecilie Fløe	Tampa Bay Sun	4
9	(United States) Katelyn Duong	DC Power	4

=== Clean sheets ===
Rank	Player	Club	Clean Sheets
1	(United States) Madison White	Dallas Trinity	9
1	(United States) Hope Hisey	Spokane Zephyr	9
3	(United States) Cosette Morché	Fort Lauderdale United	7
4	(United States) Meagan McClelland	Carolina Ascent	6
5	(United States) Ashley Orkus	Tampa Bay Sun	5
5	(United States) Samantha Leshnak Murphy	Carolina Ascent	5
5	(Australia) Morgan Aquino	DC Power	5
8	(Puerto Rico) Sydney Martinez	Brooklyn	4
8	(United States) Neeku Purcell	Brooklyn	4
10	(Jamaica) Sydney Schneider	Tampa Bay Sun	2

=== Discipline ===
==== Player ====
- Most yellow cards: 8
  - (United States) Amber Brooks (Dallas Trinity)
- Most red cards: 1
  - (Canada) Jordyn Listro (Tampa Bay Sun)
  - (United States) Tori Hansen (Brooklyn)

==== Team ====
- Most yellow cards: 48
  - Fort Lauderdale United
- Fewest yellow cards: 29
  - Lexington
- Most red cards: 1
  - Tampa Bay Sun
  - Brooklyn
- Fewest red cards: 0
  - 6 teams

== Awards ==
=== Monthly awards ===
Month	Manager of the Month		Player of the Month		Goal of the Month		Save of the Month		Ref.
Month	Manager	Club	Player	Club	Player	Club	Player	Club	Ref.
August	(England); Philip Poole	Carolina Ascent	(United States); Ashley Orkus	Tampa Bay; Sun	(United States); Mia Corbin	Carolina Ascent	(United States); Ashley Orkus	Tampa Bay; Sun	
September	(England); Tyrone Mears	Fort; Lauderdale; United	(United States); Jessica Garziano	Brooklyn	(United States); Jessica Garziano	Brooklyn	(United States); Madison White	Dallas Trinity	
October	(Scotland); Pauline; MacDonald	Dallas Trinity	(United States); Madi Parsons	Lexington	(United States); Marley Canales	Spokane Zephyr	(United States); Sarah Cox	Lexington	
November	(Canada) Denise; Schilte-Brown	Tampa Bay; Sun	(United States); Samantha Meza	Dallas Trinity	(Brazil); Luana; Grabias	Brooklyn	(United States); Sarah Cox (2)	Lexington	
December	(Canada); Jessica Silva	Brooklyn	(United States); Jasmine Hamid	Fort; Lauderdale; United	(United States); Hannah Richardson	Lexington	(United States); Sarah Cox (3)	Lexington	
February	(United States); Jo Johnson	Spokane Zephyr	(United States); Jasmine Hamid (2)	Fort; Lauderdale; United	(Japan); Yuuka Kurosaki	DC Power	(United States); Cosette Morché	Fort; Lauderdale; United	
March	(England); Tyrone Mears (2)	Fort; Lauderdale; United	(United States); Mia Corbin	Carolina Ascent	(United States); Julie Mackin	Lexington	(Puerto Rico); Sydney Martinez	Brooklyn	
April	(England); Philip Poole (2)	Carolina Ascent	(United States); McKenzie Weinert	Spokane Zephyr	(United States); Audrey Harding	Carolina Ascent	(United States); Sarah Cox (4)	Lexington	
May	(Canada) Denise; Schilte-Brown (2)	Tampa Bay; Sun	(Denmark); Cecilie Fløe	Tampa Bay; Sun	N/A	N/A	N/A	N/A	

=== Team of the Month ===
Month	Goalkeeper	Defenders	Midfielders	Forwards	Bench	Ref.
August	(United States) Ashley Orkus, TB	(United States) Vicky Bruce, CAR; (United States) Brooke Hendrix, TB; (England) Abbey-Leigh Stringer, DC; (Tonga) Laveni Vaka, FTL	(Bosnia and Herzegovina) Emina Ekić, SPK; (United States) Cori Sullivan, LEX; (England) Chioma Ubogagu, DAL; (United States) Felicia Knox, FTL	(United States) Mia Corbin, CAR; (United States) Allie Thornton, DAL	N/A	
September	(United States) Meagan McClelland, CAR	(United States) Sydney Studer, CAR; (United States) Talia Staude, TB; (United States) Madison Wolfbauer, DC	(Bosnia and Herzegovina) Emina Ekić, SPK (2); (United States) Amber Brooks, DAL; (England) Chioma Ubogagu, DAL (2); (United States) Mackenzie George, BKN	(United States) Addie McCain, FTL; (United States) Jessica Garziano, BKN; (United States) Jasmine Hamid, FTL	(United States) Izzy Nino, SPK; (United States) Sydny Nasello, TB; (United States) Maddy Perez, LEX; (United States) Mia Corbin, CAR (2); (United States) Allie Thornton, DAL (2)	
October	(United States) Madison White, DAL	(Puerto Rico) Jill Aguilera, CAR; (United States) Hannah Davison, DAL; (Haiti) Claire Constant, DC; (United States) Celia Gaynor, FTL	(United States) Sydny Nasello, TB (2); (United States) Marley Canales, SPK; (United States) Samantha Kroeger, BKN; (United States) Mackenzie Pluck, BKN	(United States) Ashlynn Serepca, CAR; (United States) Madi Parsons, LEX	(Ecuador) Jaydah Bedoya, CAR; (United States) Maddy Perez, LEX (2); (United States) Susanna Friedrichs, DC; (United States) Taylor Aylmer, SPK; (United States) Meagan McClelland, CAR (2)	
November	(United States) Hope Hisey, SPK	(United States) Vicky Bruce, CAR (2); (United States) Madison Wolfbauer, DC (2); (Canada) Vivianne Bessette, TB	(United States) Carlee Giammona, TB; (United States) Samantha Meza, DAL; (Canada) Amanda Allen, LEX; (United States) Felicia Knox, FTL (2)	(United States) Gracie Brian, DAL; (Brazil) Luana Grabias, BKN; (England) Natasha Flint, TB	(United States) Madi Parsons, LEX (2); (Ecuador) Jaydah Bedoya, CAR (2); (United States) Madison White, DAL (2); (United States) Sarah Clark, SPK	
December	(United States) Neeku Purcell, BKN	(Canada) Sabrina McNeill, FTL; (United States) Allison Pantuso, BKN; (United States) Jenna Walker, DAL; (Canada) Julianne Vallerand, SPK	(United States) Samantha Kroeger, BKN (2); (United States) Shea Moyer, LEX; (United States) Addie McCain, FTL (2)	(England) Natasha Flint, TB (2); (United States) Allie Thornton, DAL (3); (United States) Jasmine Hamid, FTL (2)	(United States) Susanna Friedrichs, DC (2); (United States) Julie Mackin, LEX; (Canada) Jordyn Listro, TB; (United States) Sydney Studer, CAR (2); (United States) Bridgette Skiba, LEX	
February	(United States) Hope Hisey, SPK (2)	(United States) Jenna Butler, CAR; (United States) Laurel Ansbrow, FTL; (United States) Sarah Clark, SPK (2)	(United States) Samantha Kroeger, BKN (3); (United States) Amber Brooks, DAL (2); (United States) Emily Colton, DC; (United States) Addie McCain, FTL (3)	(United States) Mia Corbin, CAR (3); (United States) Carlee Giammona, TB (2); (United States) Jasmine Hamid, FTL (3)	(United States) Kelsey Hill, BKN; (United States) Brooke Hendrix, TB (2); (United States) Nicole Vernis, LEX; (United States) Sydny Nasello, TB (3); (United States) Lexi Missimo, DAL	
March	(United States) Cosette Morché, FTL	(United States) Hannah Davison, DAL (2); (United States) Laurel Ansbrow, FTL (2); (United States) Haley Thomas, SPK	(United States) Taylor Aylmer, SPK (2); (United States) Shea Moyer, LEX (2); (United States) Audrey Harding, CAR; (United States) Mackenzie George, BKN (2)	(United States) Mia Corbin, CAR (4); (England) Natasha Flint, TB (3); (United States) Gianna Gourley, DC	(Canada) Vivianne Bessette, TB (2); (United States) Camryn Lancaster, DAL; (United States) Sh'Nia Gordon, FTL; (Puerto Rico) Jill Aguilera, CAR (2)	
April	(United States) Samantha Leshnak Murphy, CAR	(Guyana) Sydney Cummings, SPK; (United States) Susanna Fitch, DC; (United States) Sydney Studer, CAR (3); (United States) Brooke Hendrix, TB (3)	(United States) Addie McCain, FTL (4); (United States) Sydny Nasello, TB (4); (United States) Amber Brooks, DAL (3)	(United States) Mia Corbin, CAR (5); (Brazil) Tamara Bolt, DAL; (United States) McKenzie Weinert, SPK	(United States) Allie Thornton, DAL (4); (United States) Shea Moyer, LEX (3); (Bosnia and Herzegovina) Emina Ekić, SPK; (United States) Ashley Orkus, TB (2)	
May	(Jamaica) Sydney Schneider, TB	(Canada) Sabrina McNeill, FTL (2); (United States) Jenna Butler, CAR (2); (United States) Sarah Clark, SPK (3)	(United States) Hope Breslin, BKN; (United States) Katie Duong, DC; (Bosnia and Herzegovina) Emina Ekić, SPK (4); (United States) Sh'Nia Gordon, FTL	(Denmark) Cecilie Fløe, TB; (Ethiopia) Loza Abera, DC; (United States) Allie Thornton, DAL (5)	(United States) Brooke Hendrix, TB (4); (England) Chioma Ubogagu, DAL (3); (United States) Kiara Locklear, FTL; (United States) Ally Cook, SPK	

== Media ==
=== Streaming ===
All 112 regular-season games and three playoff matches streamed on Peacock.
