= Cameron Brooks =

American soccer player (born 2000)

- Brooks with the North Carolina Courage in 2026

Personal information
- Full name: Cameron Renee Brooks
- Date of birth: April 17, 2000 (age 26)
- Height: 5 ft 9 in (1.75 m)
- Position: Center back

Team information
- Current team: North Carolina Courage
- Number: 5

Youth career
- Lonestar SC
- 2015–2017: Cedar Ridge Raiders

College career
Years	Team	Apps	(Gls)
2018–2022	Texas Longhorns	72	(9)

Senior career*
Years	Team	Apps	(Gls)
2024–2025	Fort Lauderdale United	19	(0)
2025–2026	Napoli	10	(1)
2026–	North Carolina Courage	1	(0)
- * Club domestic league appearances and goals as of April 23, 2026

Cameron Renee Brooks (born April 17, 2000) is an American professional soccer player who plays as a center back for the North Carolina Courage of the National Women's Soccer League (NWSL). She played college soccer for the Texas Longhorns. She also previously played for USL Super League club Fort Lauderdale United and Serie A Femminile club Napoli.

== Early life ==
Brooks grew up in Round Rock, Texas, the daughter of Roger and Eva Renwick-Brooks, and has two brothers. She began playing soccer when she was seven years old. She played high school soccer for Cedar Ridge High School in Round Rock, scoring 27 goals with 19 assists in her career and being named the district MVP in 2017. She played ECNL club soccer for Lonestar SC.

== College career ==
Brooks enrolled in the University of Texas at Austin in the spring of 2018. She played in 11 games off the bench as a freshman. Having been recruited as a defender, she gained playing time for the Texas Longhorns with a move to left winger as a sophomore in 2019. She played in 15 games, starting 7, and scored 2 goals. In her junior year in 2020, she scored 3 goals in 12 games, starting 8, but the season was disrupted by the COVID-19 pandemic, which gave her a fifth year of college eligibility. In her senior year in 2021, she played in 20 games, making 15 starts, and scored 1 goal as she helped the Longhorns finish runner-up for the Big 12 Conference regular-season and tournament titles. She started 14 games and scored 3 goals in her fifth season in 2022, before tearing her anterior cruciate ligament (ACL) and missing the rest of the season.

== Club career ==
Brooks was considered a potential selection in the 2023 NWSL Draft but was ultimately not drafted. After working multiple jobs while recovering from her ACL injury, she got back onto the field with FC Málaga City Academy in Spain. Following unsuccessful trials with the NWSL's San Diego Wave and Portland Thorns, in May 2024, she signed her first professional contract with USL Super League club Fort Lauderdale United before the league's inaugural season.

Brooks made her professional debut as a halftime substitute for Sheyenne Allen in United's second game, a 2–1 loss to the Carolina Ascent, on September 6, 2024. The following week, she made her first professional start and assisted Addie McCain in a 2–0 win over DC Power FC for the club's first victory. She helped clinch a playoff berth with an assist to Sh'Nia Gordon in a 1–1 draw against the Spokane Zephyr in the season finale on May 31, 2025. In the playoffs, she played the entirety of two extra-time contests as United won 2–1 against the Carolina Ascent in the semifinals, then lost 1–0 to the Tampa Bay Sun in the final.

Brooks then signed with Italian club Napoli on a one-year deal with the option to extend another year. She made her debut with the start in a 2–1 loss to Lazio in the Serie A Women's Cup on August 23, 2025. On September 7, in the following game, she scored her first professional goal with a header in a 2–2 draw with Parma. She scored her first league goal in a 4–3 win over Ternana on October 12. She played every minute of the league campaign through ten matchdays before leaving the club.

In January 2026, Brooks transferred to the NWSL's North Carolina Courage for an undisclosed fee, signing a two-year contract with a club option for another year. On April 23, she made her NWSL debut as a late substitute for Dani Weatherholt in a 2–1 win over Racing Louisville.

== International career ==
Brooks was called into training camps with the United States under-14, under-16, and under-18 teams between 2014 and 2018.

== Honors ==
Texas Longhorns

- Big 12 Conference: 2022
