= Anna Henderson (soccer) =

American soccer player (born 2000)

Personal information
- Full name: Annelise Marie Henderson
- Date of birth: January 21, 2000 (age 26)
- Place of birth: Kirkland, Washington, U.S.
- Height: 5 ft 6 in (1.68 m)
- Positions: Midfielder; forward

Youth career
- Crossfire Premier

College career
Years	Team	Apps	(Gls)
2018–2020	Louisville Cardinals	18	(0)
2021–2022	UCF Knights	29	(2)

Senior career*
Years	Team	Apps	(Gls)
2023	Mallbackens IF	24	(6)
2024	Santos Laguna	11	(4)
2024–2025	Fort Lauderdale United	8	(1)
2025–2026	Kansas City Current II	–	(–)
- * Club domestic league appearances and goals as of 01:45, July 22, 2026 (UTC)

Annelise Marie Henderson (born January 21, 2000) is an American former professional soccer player who played as a midfielder. She played college soccer for the Louisville Cardinals and UCF Knights before spending a total of three years professionally with Swedish club Mallbackens IF, Mexican club Santos Laguna, and USL Super League club Fort Lauderdale United FC.

== Early life ==
As a child, Henderson's family moved around frequently before settling in Kirkland, Washington, when Henderson was 10 years old. Henderson played club soccer for Crossfire Premier SC, where she helped the team reach one Elite Clubs National League national championship match and one final four finish. In 2016, she scored in Crossfire's ECNL national third-place match that ended as a victory over FC Massachusetts. Henderson also played at Lake Washington High School, where she received one first-team all-conference honor and helped Lake Washington win a conference championship in 2014.

== College career ==
Henderson started her college soccer career with the Louisville Cardinals. She struggled to earn playing time for the Cardinals, playing in 18 matches over three seasons largely as a substitute. The majority of her appearances came in her sophomore year, in which she participated in 11 games and earned the only start of her Louisville career.

Ahead of the 2021 season, Henderson transferred to the University of Central Florida to expend her remaining two years of NCAA eligibility with the Knights. In her first season at UCF, she made 11 appearances (9 starts) and was the team's joint leader in assists, with 5. The following year, she made a career-high 18 appearances and helped contribute to UCF's AAC Conference regular season title. She scored her first collegiate goal and played a season-high 73 minutes on September 4, 2022, in a 2–1 loss to Ole Miss. On November 3, she scored against Memphis in the Knights' AAC tournament semifinal defeat. Henderson was later named to the 2022 AAC all-tournament team. She capped off her college career with appearances in both of UCF's NCAA tournament matches as the Knights were eliminated in the second round by eventual champions UCLA.

== Club career ==
=== Mallbackens IF ===
Henderson chose not to enter into the NWSL Draft, instead opting to start her professional career overseas. In March 2023, she signed her first professional contract with Swedish second-division side Mallbackens IF, a move facilitated in part by her Swedish-based agent. She joined Texas native Hailey Davidson as the only two Americans on the team. In her lone season with Mallbacken, Henderson registered 6 goals and 3 assists as the club finished in ninth place in the Elitettan table.

=== Santos Laguna ===
On January 10, 2024, Henderson was announced to have joined Mexican club Santos Laguna. She made her Liga MX Femenil debut shortly after, in a match against Mexican powerhouses Tigres UANL. On February 9, 2024, Henderson scored her first two Liga MX goals in a 10–2 defeat to Guadalajara.

=== Fort Lauderdale United ===
In June 2024, Henderson was joined Floridian club Fort Lauderdale United FC ahead of the inaugural USL Super League season; the move reunited Henderson with her family, who were located in the Fort Lauderdale area at the time. She made her Super League debut on August 17, 2024, coming on as a second-half substitute for Sh'Nia Gordon in Fort Lauderdale United's inaugural match, a draw with the Spokane Zephyr. On November 10, she scored her first goal for the club, a stoppage-time equalizer against the Tampa Bay Sun that helped Fort Lauderdale salvage a point and end a three-match losing streak. At the end of the season, Henderson was among the contingent of players departing from Fort Lauderdale. She had made 8 appearances for the club, all of which occurred in the first half of the season.

Henderson then joined Kansas City Current II, participating in the pre-professional Women's Premier Soccer League and in The Soccer Tournament 2026. On July 21, 2026, she announced her retirement from professional soccer.

== Personal life ==
Henderson was born into a soccer-focused family, with her brothers, cousins, and uncles all having played the sport. Her father, Chris, is a former United States men's national team player who is currently serving as the sporting director of MLS club Atlanta United FC. Henderson graduated from the University of Central Florida with Magna cum Laude honors.

== Honors and awards ==
UCF Knights

- American Athletic Conference: 2022

Individual

- AAC tournament all-tournament team: 2022
