= Justina Gaynor =

American soccer player (born 2001)

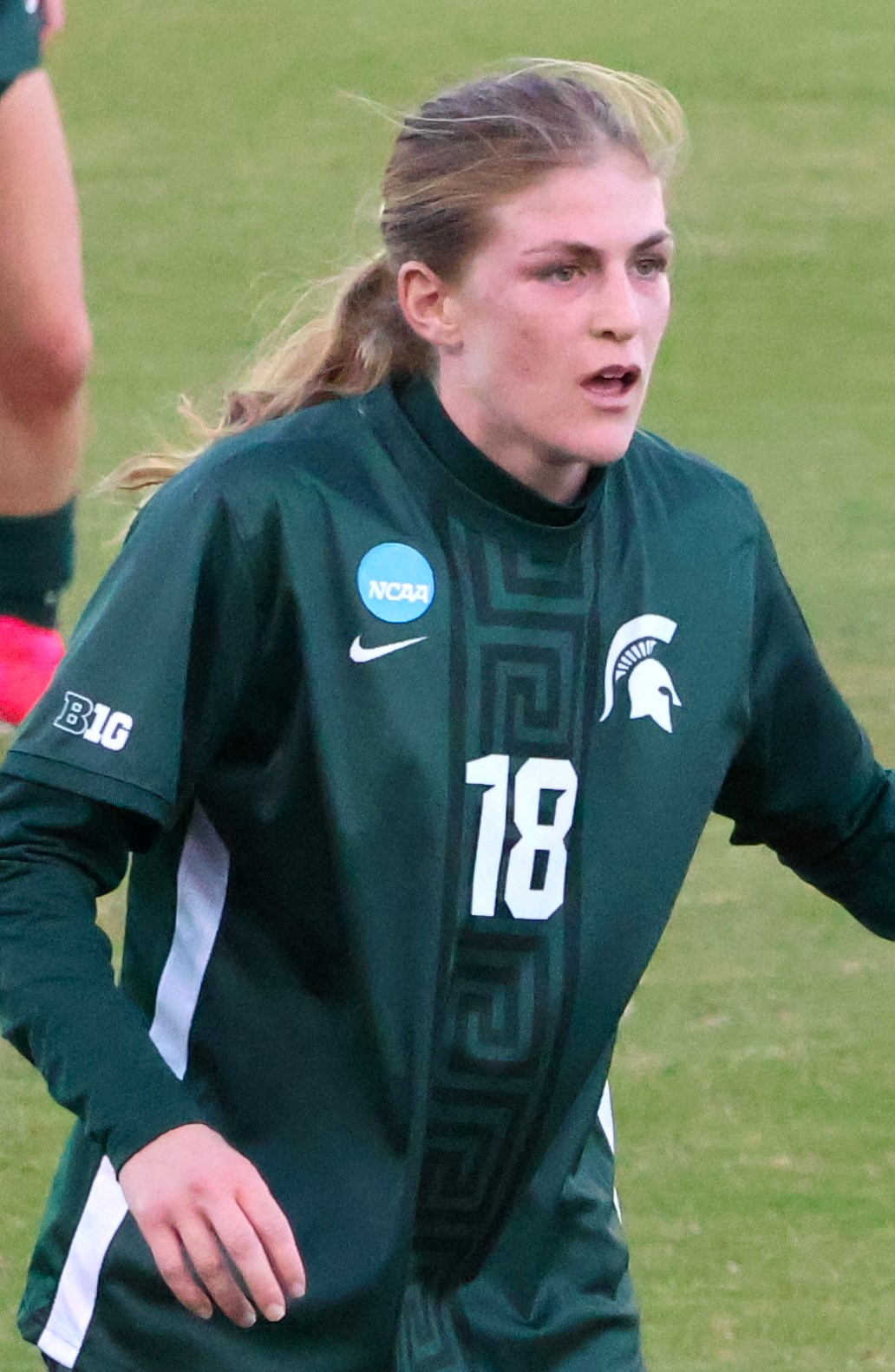
- Gaynor with Michigan State in 2024

Personal information
- Full name: Justina Gabrielle Gaynor
- Date of birth: December 21, 2001 (age 24)
- Height: 5 ft 8 in (1.73 m)
- Positions: Midfielder; defender

Team information
- Current team: DC Power FC
- Number: 23

College career
Years	Team	Apps	(Gls)
2020–2021	Butler Bulldogs	12	(2)
2021–2024	Michigan State Spartans	83	(17)

Senior career*
Years	Team	Apps	(Gls)
2025	Chicago Stars	2	(0)
2025	Lexington SC	8	(0)
2026–	DC Power FC	14	(0)
- * Club domestic league appearances and goals as of 01:42, May 18, 2026 (UTC)

Justina Gabrielle Gaynor (born December 21, 2001) is an American professional soccer player who plays as a midfielder for USL Super League club DC Power FC. She played college soccer for the Butler Bulldogs and the Michigan State Spartans and was named Big Ten Midfielder of the Year in 2023. She also previously played for Chicago Stars FC of the National Women's Soccer League (NWSL) and Lexington SC of the USL Super League. She is the sister of soccer player Celia Gaynor.

== Early life ==
Gaynor grew up in Shelby Township, Michigan, one of three children born to Paul and Rita Gaynor. Her older sister, Celia, played alongside her at Butler and Michigan State. She played soccer and basketball at Notre Dame Preparatory. She played club soccer for Nationals Development Academy, winning three USYS national titles.

== College career ==
Gaynor spent one season with the Butler Bulldogs, playing in the spring after the usual fall season was pushed back due to the COVID-19 pandemic. She started all 12 games and scored 2 goals. She then transferred alongside her sister to the Michigan State Spartans. She appeared in 17 games, starting 11 of them, and scored 2 goals in her first season in East Lansing in 2021. She established herself on the team as a junior in 2022, starting all 23 games, scoring 4 goals with 2 assists, and being named first-team All-Big Ten. Michigan State went undefeated in their Big Ten Conference schedule to win their first-ever outright regular-season title, losing to Penn State in the Big Ten tournament final.

Gaynor started all 22 games in senior season and led the team in outfield minutes in 2023, recording a career-high 6 goals and 12 assists. In the NCAA tournament, she scored from the penalty spot in a 1–0 win against Harvard, which led Michigan State to advance to the third round of the tournament for the first time in program history. She was named first-team All-Big Ten and the Big Ten Midfielder of the Year. In her graduate season in 2024, she played 21 games, starting all but one of them, and scored 5 goals with 6 assists. Michigan State equaled their best NCAA tournament result. Gaynor was named first-team All-Big Ten and third-team All-American, becoming the fourth All-American in program history.

== Club career ==
=== Chicago Stars ===
Following a preseason trial as a non-roster invitee, Gaynor signed her first professional contract with Chicago Stars FC on March 12, 2025, signing a one-year deal with an option to extend for another year. Previously a midfielder, she made Chicago's roster as a defender. She made her professional debut two days later as a second-half substitute for Camryn Biegalski in the season opener against the Orlando Pride. She made one further appearance, starting against Racing Louisville on March 30, before the Stars announced that she had mutually agreed to terminate her contract on July 1.

=== Lexington SC ===
Gaynor signed with USL Super League club Lexington SC on July 8, 2025. She debuted for the club on August 23, coming on as a second-half substitute for Addie McCain in Lexington's season-opening draw with Fort Lauderdale United FC. She made eight appearances for Lexington before departing on mutual contract termination at the end of the year.

=== DC Power FC ===
In January 2026, Gaynor signed with fellow USL Super League club DC Power FC for the rest of the season. Five minutes into her DC Power debut, a substitute appearance against Sporting JAX on February 7, 2026, Gaynor assisted Alyssa Walker's game-winning goal that helped DC kick off its spring campaign with a victory.

Starting her second season in DC on the backline, Gaynor was named to the USL Super League Team of the Month for August 2026 after helping Power FC's defense allow three goals through its opening slate of matches.

== Honors and awards ==
Michigan State Spartans

- Big Ten Conference: 2022, 2023

Individual

- Third-team All-American: 2024
- First-team All-Big Ten: 2022, 2023, 2024
- Big Ten Midfielder of the Year: 2023
