= Celia Gaynor =

American soccer player (born 2000)

Personal information
- Full name: Celia Clare Gaynor
- Date of birth: March 25, 2000 (age 26)
- Height: 5 ft 8 in (1.73 m)
- Position: Defender

Youth career
- Nationals DA

College career
Years	Team	Apps	(Gls)
2018–2021	Butler Bulldogs	41	(1)
2022–2023	Michigan State Spartans	43	(5)

Senior career*
Years	Team	Apps	(Gls)
2022–2023	AFC Flint City		
2024–2025	Fort Lauderdale United	21	(0)
2026	UNAM	5	(0)
- * Club domestic league appearances and goals as of 13:49, May 5, 2026 (UTC)

Celia Clare Gaynor (born March 25, 2000) is an American professional soccer player who plays as a defender. She played college soccer for the Butler Bulldogs and the Michigan State Spartans before starting her professional career with USL Super League club Fort Lauderdale United FC and Mexican Liga MX Femenil club UNAM. She is the sister of fellow soccer player Justina Gaynor.

== Early life ==
Gaynor grew up in Shelby Township, Michigan, where she played club soccer for Nationals DA. She attended high school at the Notre Dame Preparatory School and Marist Academy in the nearby town of Pontiac. Gaynor was a three-year starter at Notre Dame prep, contributing largely to two consecutive division championships and a Michigan D2 State title in 2016. As a sophomore, she led the team with 19 goals and was named first team all-region and all-district. Gaynor reached greater heights the following year, also being named to the all-state team as a junior. In August 2016, Gaynor committed to Butler University.

== College career ==
=== Butler Bulldogs ===
Gaynor began play with the Butler Bulldogs in 2018, operating as a midfielder and playing 12 games as a freshman. Her sophomore season started with a bang, with Gaynor netting her first collegiate goal on Butler's opening match of 2019. She would find further offensive success, recording a career-high 17 shots across 19 games. She played one more season with Butler before transferring to Michigan State University. Gaynor graduated from Butler with 41 appearances and, in the academic realm, summa cum laude honors in two fields.

=== Michigan State Spartans ===
In her first season with Michigan State, Gaynor appeared in all 23 matches across the season. The Spartans qualified for the 2022 NCAA Tournament, playing their first-ever NCAA home match against Milwaukee in November 2022. During the match, Gaynor played 25 minutes and scored a goal to help Michigan State secure a 3–2 victory. At the end of the season, she was named to the Academic All Big-Ten team.

Gaynor moved to the backline in her final year of college, converting into a defender. She helped Michigan State reach a consecutive NCAA tournament appearance for the second time in history and played all three matches, including MSU's inaugural third-round appearance. Gaynor was named to the All Big-Ten First Team for her efforts. She completed her Michigan State career having helped the team win a conference title in both years, racking up 43 appearances and 5 goals along the way.

== Club career ==
=== Fort Lauderdale United ===
The Chicago Red Stars selected Gaynor in the fourth round of the 2024 NWSL Draft, making her the 45th overall pick of the league's final draft. After training with the Red Stars in preseason, Gaynor was eventually informed that Chicago were not ready to offer her a contract, but could keep her as a non-rostered training player. Gaynor then chose to explore an opportunity with Fort Lauderdale United FC that had been introduced to her by Red Stars coach Lorne Donaldson.

On May 20, 2024, Fort Lauderdale United FC of the USL Super League signed Gaynor to her first professional contract ahead of the league's inaugural season. She started in Fort Lauderdale's first-ever match, a 1–1 draw with Spokane Zephyr FC. As the season progressed, Gaynor cultivated a strong center-back pairing with Laveni Vaka and was later named to the USL Super League Team of the Month for October after playing every minute of the month.

=== UNAM ===
On February 1, 2026, Gaynor was announced to have signed a contract with Mexican club Pumas UNAM. She made her Liga MX Femenil debut later that day, coming on as a second-half substitute in a 5–1 defeat to Club América. On 18 March 2026, Gaynor received her first-ever career red card, getting sent off in the 90th minute of a loss to Tijuana after committing a second bookable offence. Gaynor went on to make 5 appearances for UNAM before leaving the club at the end of the season.

== Personal life ==
She is the sister of Chicago Stars FC defender Justina Gaynor. The siblings played together for one season at Butler University and two at Michigan State.

== Career statistics ==
=== Club ===
As of May 5, 2026

Appearances and goals by club, season and competition
Club	Season	League			Cup		Playoffs		Total	
Club	Season	Division	Apps	Goals	Apps	Goals	Apps	Goals	Apps	Goals
Fort Lauderdale United FC	2024–25	USL Super League	21	0	—		1	0	22	0
Pumas UNAM	2025–26	Liga MX Femenil	5	0	—		—		5	0
Career total			26	0	0	0	1	0	27	0
