= Erin McKinney =

American soccer player (born 2000)

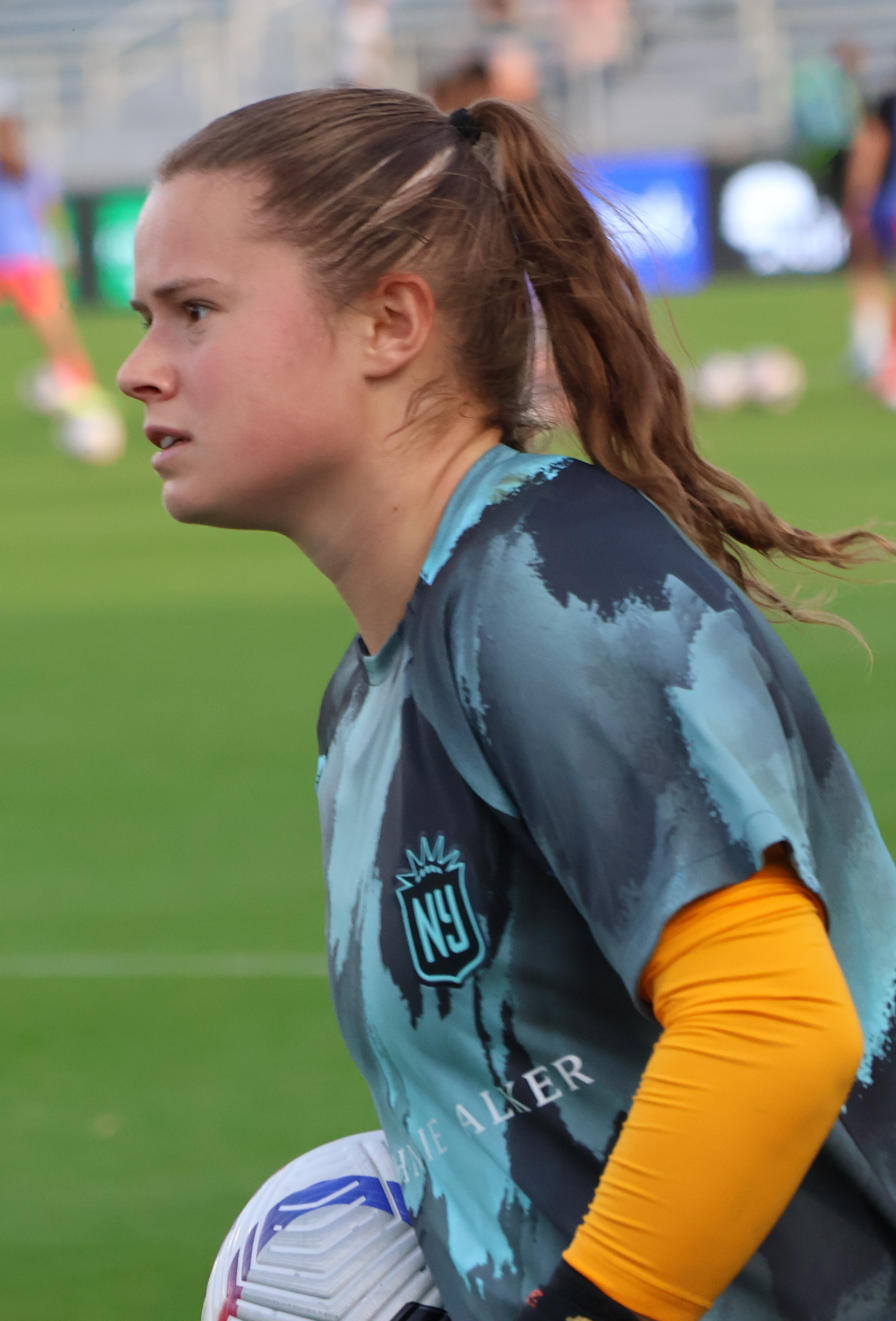
- McKinney with NJ/NY Gotham FC in 2024

Personal information
- Date of birth: May 29, 2000 (age 26)
- Place of birth: Belvidere, Illinois
- Height: 5 ft 5 in (1.65 m)
- Position: Goalkeeper

College career
Years	Team	Apps	(Gls)
2018	Akron Zips	18	(0)
2019–2023	Wisconsin Badgers	41	(0)

Senior career*
Years	Team	Apps	(Gls)
2024	NJ/NY Gotham FC	0	(0)
2024	Houston Dash	0	(0)
2025	Fort Lauderdale United	0	(0)
2026	Portland Thorns	0	(0)
- * Club domestic league appearances and goals as of July 25, 2025

Erin McKinney (born May 29, 2000) is an American professional soccer player who plays as a goalkeeper. She played college soccer for the Akron Zips and the Wisconsin Badgers.

== Early life ==
McKinney was raised in Belvidere, Illinois, one of two children born to Marc and Lara McKinney. She started playing club soccer with Raptors, later playing for Campton United. She lettered in three years of prep soccer at Belvidere North High School, being named the Rock River Valley Player of the Year after her junior season. She committed to play college soccer at the University of Akron.

== College career ==
McKinney started all but two games for the Akron Zips in her freshman season in 2018, making 101 saves but keeping only 3 clean sheets in 18 games. She then transferred to the University of Wisconsin–Madison in 2019, redshirting her first season with the Wisconsin Badgers. She went without playing for two further seasons, as a backup to two-time Big Ten Goalkeeper of the Year Jordyn Bloomer, and underwent surgery for a knee issue. She took over the starting position for the Badgers in 2022, starting all 19 games and keeping 7 clean sheets, as Wisconsin finished third in the Big Ten. In her graduate season in 2023, she again started all 22 games and kept 10 clean sheets (third most in the conference), helping Wisconsin reach the Big Ten tournament final and return to the NCAA tournament, where they made the second round.

== Club career ==
McKinney was not selected in the 2024 NWSL Draft but was invited to train as a non-roster player with the Chicago Red Stars in the 2024 preseason. In mid-March, NJ/NY Gotham FC announced that they had signed McKinney to her first professional contract on an injury replacement deal. She was released the following month when Gotham FC acquired new starter Ann-Katrin Berger from Chelsea.

In June 2024, McKinney signed with the Houston Dash for the rest of the season. Largely a backup to Jane Campbell, she made her professional debut and only Dash appearance on July 20, earning the start in a 3–1 loss to the Kansas City Current in the NWSL x Liga MX Femenil Summer Cup.

In February 2025, McKinney joined the USL Super League club Fort Lauderdale United during the league's inaugural season. She was Cosette Morché's unused backup as the club reached the inaugural league final, losing to the Tampa Bay Sun.

McKinney trained with the North Carolina Courage and the Portland Thorns as a non-roster invitee in the 2026 preseason. In early March, she signed with the Thorns for the rest of the month, backing up Morgan Messner during the absences of Mackenzie Arnold and Bella Bixby due to international duty and injury, respectively.
