= Laurel Ansbrow =

American soccer player (born 2003)

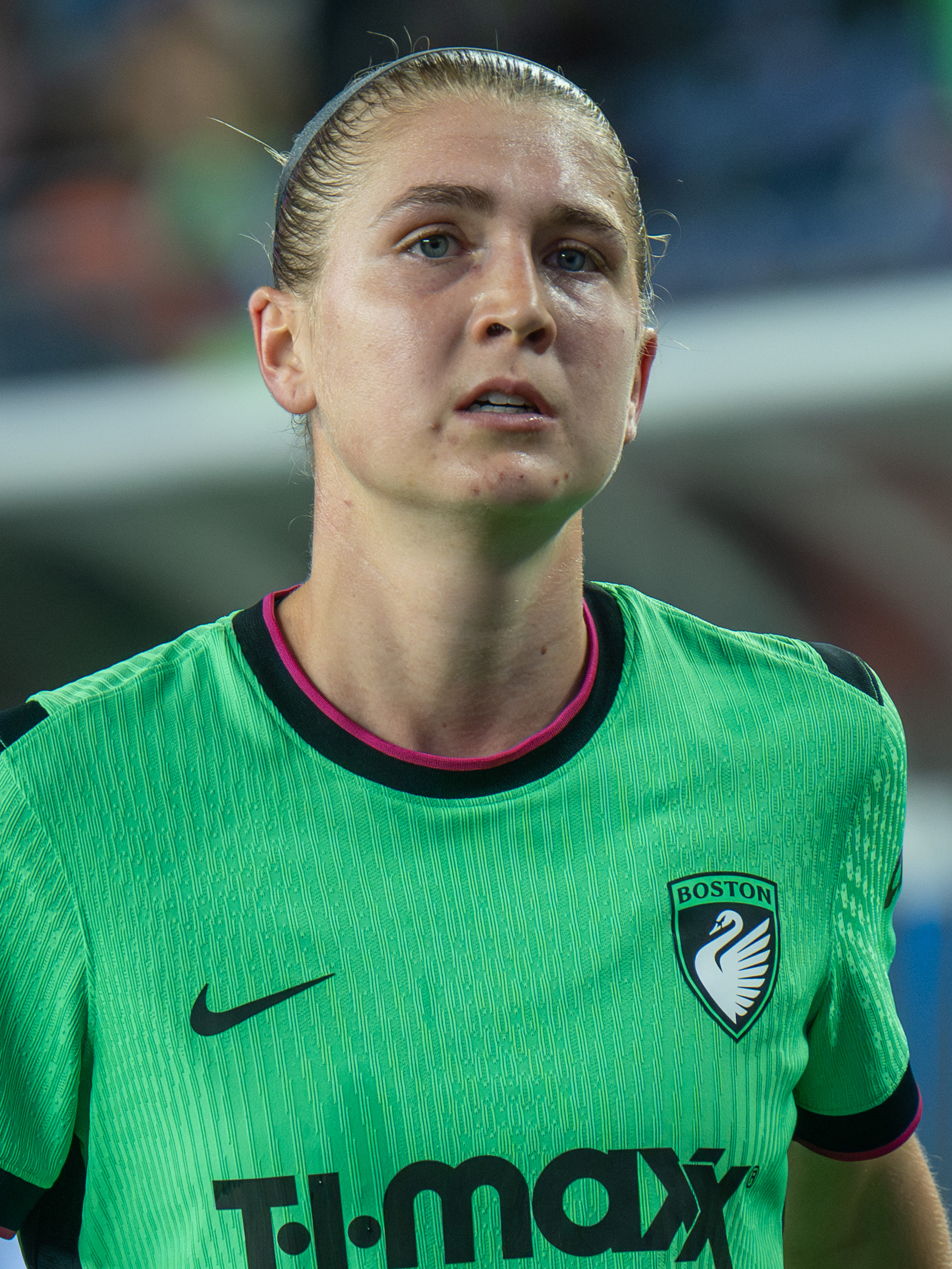
- Ansbrow with the Boston Legacy in 2026

Personal information
- Full name: Laurel Marie Ansbrow
- Date of birth: April 10, 2003 (age 23)
- Height: 5 ft 11 in (1.80 m)
- Position: Center back

Team information
- Current team: Boston Legacy
- Number: 34

Youth career
- North Carolina Courage

College career
Years	Team	Apps	(Gls)
2021–2024	Wake Forest Demon Deacons	66	(2)

Senior career*
Years	Team	Apps	(Gls)
2022–2023	North Carolina Courage U23	19	(0)
2025	Fort Lauderdale United	15	(0)
2026–	Boston Legacy	8	(0)
2025	→ Fort Lauderdale United (loan)	14	(0)
- * Club domestic league appearances and goals as of 03:20, November 4, 2026 (UTC)

Laurel Marie Ansbrow (born April 10, 2003) is an American professional soccer player who plays as a center back for Boston Legacy FC of the National Women's Soccer League (NWSL). She played college soccer for the Wake Forest Demon Deacons and helped the team to its first national title game appearance in 2024.

== Early life ==
Ansbrow grew up Cary, North Carolina, the younger of two daughters born to Jane and Mark Ansbrow. She played club soccer for the North Carolina Courage Academy, becoming team captain and earning ECNL all-conference honors twice. She committed to Wake Forest during her junior year at Apex High School, where she was also an all-conference selection.

== College career ==
Ansbrow became a starter for the Wake Forest Demon Deacons in her sophomore year in 2022, leading the team in minutes played that season and the following one. In her senior year in 2024, she helped Wake Forest achieve one of its best-ever seasons, playing alongside Zara Chavoshi in central defense. In the regular season, back-to-back shutouts against No. 2 Virginia and No. 1 Stanford made Wake Forest the first team to beat the top two ranked teams consecutively; another win against Florida State ended a 32–game unbeaten streak for the reigning champions. Wake Forest broke its program record from the previous year with only 11 goals allowed in the regular season. In the NCAA tournament, she helped Wake Forest to its first national title game in program history, beating Stanford 1–0 in the semifinals before losing 1–0 to North Carolina in the final. Ansbrow was named the No. 70 player of the 2024 season by TopDrawerSoccer and received the Elite 90 Award for having the highest grade point average (4.0) at the NCAA College Cup. In three seasons as a starter, she played in 64 games (61 starts) and scored 2 goals.

During college, Ansbrow played for the North Carolina Courage U23 in the USL W League and was named in the Team of the Year after leading the Courage to the national final in 2023.

== Club career ==
=== Fort Lauderdale United ===
Fort Lauderdale United announced on January 23, 2025, that the club had signed Ansbrow to her first professional contract through the rest of the USL Super League's inaugural season. She made her professional debut on February 8, playing the entire match and assisting Jasmine Hamid in a 2–2 draw against the Tampa Bay Sun. She appeared on the field for every minute of United's spring games as the club placed fourth in the inaugural standings. The league named Ansbrow to the Team of the Month after both of her first two months. In the playoffs, she played the entirety of two extra-time contests as United won 2–1 against the Carolina Ascent in the semifinals but lost 1–0 to the Tampa Bay Sun in the final.

=== Boston Legacy ===
On July 17, 2025, National Women's Soccer League (NWSL) expansion team Boston Legacy announced that the club had signed Ansbrow to a two-and-a-half-year deal with the team option to extend another year. Before the Legacy began play in 2026, she returned to Fort Lauderdale United on loan and finished the year having played every minute for the club in all but one game. She made her NWSL debut in the Legacy's first road game, coming on as a substitute for Josefine Hasbo in a 3–0 loss to the Houston Dash on March 21, 2026.

== Honors and awards ==
Wake Forest Demon Deacons

- NCAA tournament runner-up: 2024

Fort Lauderdale United FC

- USL Super League runner-up: 2024–25

Individual

- Elite 90 Award: 2024
