= Sydny Nasello =

American soccer player (born 2000)

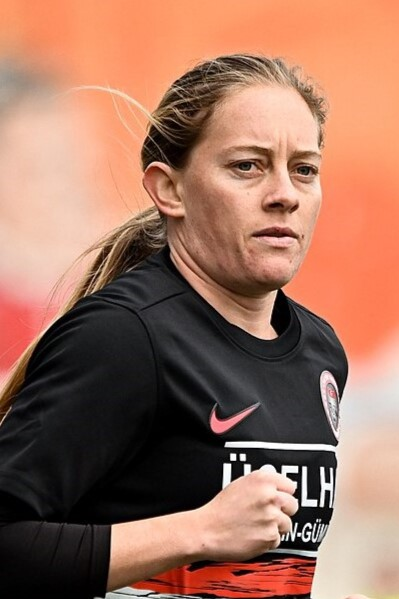
- Sydny Nasello of Fatih Vatan Spor in the 2023-24 Turkish Women's Football Super League

Personal information
- Full name: Sydny Grace Nasello
- Date of birth: April 14, 2000 (age 26)
- Place of birth: Land o' Lakes, Florida, U.S.
- Height: 5 ft 3 in (1.60 m)
- Position: Forward

Team information
- Current team: Tampa Bay Sun
- Number: 35

Youth career
- –2018: Tampa Bay United

College career
Years	Team	Apps	(Gls)
2018–2021	South Florida Bulls	71	(24)

Senior career*
Years	Team	Apps	(Gls)
2019	Florida Tropics	3	(2)
2021	Florida Premier		
2022–2023	Granadilla	18	(2)
2023	Tampa Bay United	5	(2)
2023	Apollon Limassol		
2024	Fatih Vatan Spor	2	(2)
2024–	Tampa Bay Sun	65	(10)

International career
2019	United States U20	2	(0)
- * Club domestic league appearances and goals as of 00:54, November 7, 2026 (UTC)

Sydny Grace Nasello (born April 14, 2000) is an American professional soccer player who plays as a forward for Tampa Bay Sun FC in the USL Super League.

== Career ==
In 2018, Nasello joined South Florida Bulls in the United States. She was named a Hermann Trophy semifinalist in 2021.

Nasello played two seasons in the Women's Premier Soccer League. She scored two goals in three appearances for the Florida Tropics in 2019, and returned to the league in 2021 to play for Florida Premier.

Before the 2022 season, Nasello was drafted by American side Portland Thorns, but was not signed due to her past Twitter activity, which included shares and likes of transphobic, homophobic, and racist content.

Before the second half of 2021–22, she signed for Spanish side Granadilla. On February 13, 2022, Nasello debuted for Granadilla in a 3–1 win over Villarreal. On March 13, 2022, she scored her first goal for Granadilla in a 1–0 win over Sevilla.

In June 2023, Nasello joined Cypriot club Apollon Limassol.

In February 2024, Nasello moved to Turkey, and signed a contract with the Istanbul-based club Fatih Vatan Spor to play in the second half of the 2023–24 Super League. She scored one goal in her first match. Her contract expired at the end of the season.

On July 1, 2024, Nasello signed with USL Super League club Tampa Bay Sun. On June 14, 2025, she led Tampa Bay to the inaugural USL Super League title, assisting Cecilie Fløe's goal in the 100th minute of the final against Fort Lauderdale United. Nasello was named the match MVP after the 1–0 victory.

== Honors ==
Tampa Bay Sun

- USL Super League: 2024–25

Individual

- USL Super League final MVP: 2026
- USL Super League All-League First Team: 2024–25, 2025–26
- First-team All-American: 2020
- Second-team All-American: 2021
- AAC Offensive Player of the Year: 2020, 2021
- First-team All-AAC: 2020, 2021
- Second-team All-AAC: 2018, 2019
