= Sheyenne Allen =

American soccer player (born 2001)

Personal information
- Full name: Sheyenne Deborah Antoinette Allen
- Date of birth: April 26, 2001 (age 25)
- Height: 5 ft 2 in (1.57 m)
- Position: Defender

Team information
- Current team: Halifax Tides
- Number: 3

Youth career
- Delaware Rush

College career
| Years | Team | Apps | (Gls) |
| 2019–2023 | Brown Bears | 58 | (5) |

Senior career*
| Years | Team | Apps | (Gls) |
| 2024 | Clube de Albergaria | 11 | (1) |
| 2024–2025 | Fort Lauderdale United | 17 | (1) |
| 2026– | Halifax Tides | 0 | (0) |
- * Club domestic league appearances and goals as of 15:11, January 7, 2026 (UTC)

Sheyenne Deborah Antoinette Allen (born April 26, 2001) is an American professional soccer player who plays as a defender for Northern Super League club Halifax Tides FC. She played college soccer for the Brown Bears before starting her professional career with Portuguese side Clube de Albergaria and USL Super League club Fort Lauderdale United FC.

== Early life ==
Allen grew up in Bear, Delaware. She attended Cab Calloway School of the Arts and was a four-year class president. She started off playing for the CCSA Varsity soccer team as an eighth grader and amassed 92 goals across her five seasons on the team. Allen was also a kicker on the school's football team and dabbled in track and field. She played club soccer for Delaware Rush and was a member of Delaware's Olympic Development Program.

== College career ==
Allen matriculated at Brown University and started playing with the school's soccer team in 2019. As a freshman, Allen played in 15 games and helped the Brown Bears win an Ivy League title and qualify for the NCAA tournament for the first time since 1994. Allen and the Bears won the conference title the following year as well. As time passed, Allen rose up the ranks of the squad and eventually became a team captain for Brown. She had an explosive start to 2023, scoring two goals in Brown's opening match and subsequently being named the Ivy League Offensive player of the Week. At the end of her final season, Allen was named to the All-Ivy second team; she had previously been an honorable mention the year before. She finished her time at Brown having played in 58 matches and scored 5 goals.

== Club career ==
=== Clube de Albergaria ===
On January 11, 2024, Allen signed a contract with Portuguese Clube de Albergaria in the middle of the 2023–24 Campeonato Nacional Feminino. She scored her first league goal on March 24, helping Clube de Albergaria secure a 2–0 victory over Länk Vilaverdense. At the end of her first professional season, Allen had recorded 14 appearances and 3 goals in all competitions.

=== Fort Lauderdale United FC ===
Fort Lauderdale United FC of the USL Super League signed Allen on June 12, 2024, ahead of the inaugural Super League season. Allen played in the club's first-ever match, a 1–1 draw with Spokane Zephyr FC. During the game, she conceded a penalty kick that led to Spokane's only goal of the match. Fort Lauderdale and Spokane met again on December 7, 2024, with Fort Lauderdale earning a 2–1 win via goals from Addie McCain and, later, Allen. It was her first USL Super League goal. She started in 5 of her 14 appearances across the season and made one playoff cameo as Fort Lauderdale United finished as postseason runners-up to the Tampa Bay Sun.

The following season, Allen struggled to earn significant playing time. Over the first half of the campaign, she recorded 63 minutes over 4 league games. On January 7, 2026, Allen departed from Fort Lauderdale United on a mutual contract termination. She had made 18 appearances in all competitions over one and a half years.

=== Halifax Tides ===
On 21 January 2026, Allen was announced at Halifax Tides FC.

== Career statistics ==
=== Club ===
As of November 1, 2025

Appearances and goals by club, season and competition
| Club | Season | League | | | Cup (Note: Includes the Taça de Portugal and the Taça da Liga) | | Playoffs | | Total | |
| Club | Season | Division | Apps | Goals | Apps | Goals | Apps | Goals | Apps | Goals |
|---|---|---|---|---|---|---|---|---|---|---|
| Clube de Albergaria | 2023–24 | Campeonato Nacional Feminino | 11 | 1 | 3 | 2 | — | | 14 | 3 |
| Fort Lauderdale United FC | 2024–25 | USL Super League | 13 | 1 | — | | 1 | 0 | 14 | 1 |
| Fort Lauderdale United FC | 2025–26 | USL Super League | 4 | 0 | — | | — | | 4 | 0 |
| Fort Lauderdale United FC | Total | | 17 | 1 | 0 | 0 | 1 | 0 | 18 | 1 |
| Career total | | | 28 | 2 | 3 | 2 | 1 | 0 | 32 | 4 |
