= Kiara Locklear =

American soccer player (born 2002)

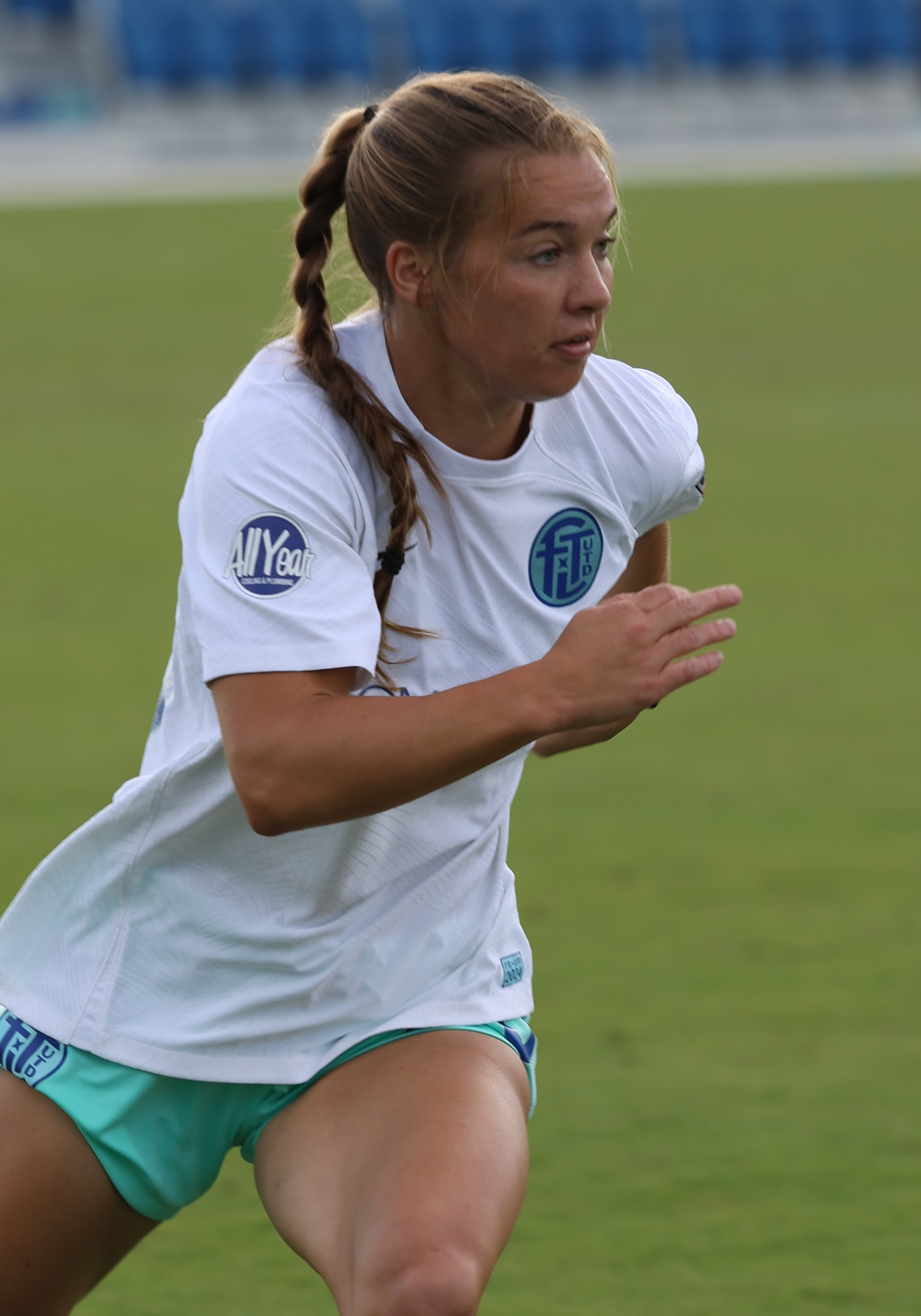
- Locklear with Fort Lauderdale United in 2025

Personal information
- Birth name: Kiara Dawn Pralle
- Date of birth: November 4, 2002 (age 23)
- Height: 5 ft 4 in (1.63 m)
- Position: Forward

Team information
- Current team: Fort Lauderdale United
- Number: 20

Youth career
- Chicago Fire Juniors Red South
- Eclipse Select SC
- 2017–2021: Bradley-Bourbonnais Boilermakers

College career
Years	Team	Apps	(Gls)
2021–2022	Charlotte 49ers	35	(1)
2023–2024	Lipscomb Bisons	42	(24)

Senior career*
Years	Team	Apps	(Gls)
2024–	Fort Lauderdale United	44	(11)
- * Club domestic league appearances and goals as of 03:35, May 18, 2026 (UTC)

Kiara Dawn Locklear (née Pralle; born November 4, 2002) is an American professional soccer player who plays as a forward for Fort Lauderdale United FC in the USL Super League. She played college soccer for the Charlotte 49ers and the Lipscomb Bisons.

== Early life ==
Locklear was raised in Bourbonnais, Illinois, where she attended Bradley-Bourbonnais Community High School. In her youth years, she played for Chicago Fire Juniors Red South and Eclipse Select SC. She ran cross country in high school, but only played club soccer.

== College career ==
Locklear embarked on her collegiate soccer career at Charlotte, where she earned recognition as a freshman, including a Conference USA (CUSA) All-Freshman Team honor.

She then transferred to Lipscomb University prior to the 2023 season. There she made a significant impact in her senior year. At Lipscomb she led the conference with 19 goals and 4 assists — marking a program record for single‐season points — and was named the Atlantic Sun Conference (ASUN) Player of the Year. Her senior season was capped off by a hat-trick in an ASUN tournament semifinal. Lipscomb defeated Central Arkansas 7–0. Following her senior season, Locklear was named to the NCAA Division I All-America Fourth Team. Locklear and Zara Siassi of the North Florida Ospreys were the only ASUN athletes chosen that year.

== Club career ==
Locklear signed with Fort Lauderdale United FC ahead of the second half of the club's inaugural season in the USL Super League. Despite joining mid-season, she quickly became an integral part of the attack, making 18 appearances, including 16 starts, and recording seven goals and four assists, tying for the team lead in the latter category. During her debut campaign, Locklear scored decisive goals in several key matches, including the lone goal in a 1–0 victory over Dallas Trinity FC on May 24, 2025, a result that secured Fort Lauderdale's playoff berth. On September 28, 2025, she became the club's all-time leading scorer with a goal in a 2–1 away win against Brooklyn FC. In the 2025 USL Super League semifinals, Locklear scored the decisive goal in the 119th minute against Carolina Ascent, securing Fort Lauderdale’s spot in the inaugural championship final. The Miami Herald described her as a key figure in the team’s “star power”.

In a September 2025 match against Dallas Trinity FC, Locklear scored Fort Lauderdale’s fourth goal in a 4–1 victory, helping the team snap Dallas’s three-game winning streak. The goal marked her third of the season in four matches. In October 2025, Locklear earned her second USL Super League Team of the Month honor after leading Fort Lauderdale with four goals and ranking among the league leaders in shots on target.

== Honors and recognition ==
USL Super League

- Team of the Month: May 2025, September 2025

Atlantic Sun Conference

- Player of the Year: 2024
- First Team All-Conference: 2024
- Women's Soccer All-Tournament MVP: 2024
- Third Team All-Conference: 2023

Conference USA

- All-Freshman Team: 2021

United Soccer Coaches

- Division I Women's Soccer All-America Fourth Team: 2024
- All-South Region First Team: 2024

== Personal life ==
Her parents are Dan and Karla Pralle. While at Lipscomb, she majored in Exercise Science. She is married to Jordan Locklear.
