= Érica Gomes (footballer) =

Brazilian footballer (born 1997)

Personal information
- Full name: Érica Gomes da Silva Santos
- Date of birth: 8 January 1997 (age 29)
- Place of birth: Recife, Brazil
- Height: 1.69 m (5 ft 7 in)
- Position: Forward

Team information
- Current team: CSKA Moscow
- Number: 8

Senior career*
| Years | Team | Apps | (Gls) |
- Vitória das Tabocas
- São Francisco-BA
- União Desportiva-AL
| 2018 | Chapecoense | | |
| 2019 | Avaí/Kindermann | 8 | (0) |
| 2019 | Napoli | | |
| 2020 | Iranduba | 4 | (2) |
| 2020–2021 | CD Getafe | 13 | (7) |
| 2021–2022 | CD Badajoz | 24 | (13) |
| 2022–2023 | Clube de Albergaria | 25 | (9) |
| 2023–2024 | Cruz Azul | 29 | (12) |
| 2024–2025 | Fort Lauderdale United | 6 | (0) |
| 2025– | CSKA Moscow | 0 | (0) |
- * Club domestic league appearances and goals as of 21 March 2025

Érica Gomes da Silva Santos (born 8 January 1997) is a Brazilian professional footballer who plays as a forward for Russian Women's Football Championship club CSKA Moscow. After starting her career in Brazil, Gomes has played for Spanish clubs CD Getafe and CD Badajoz, Portuguese side Clube de Albergaria, Liga MX Femenil club Cruz Azul, and Fort Lauderdale United FC of the USL Super League.

== Club career ==
=== Early career ===
Born in Recife, Gomes participated both in swimming and running as a child. In 2014, she started playing football professionally for Vitória das Tabocas before later moving to São Francisco-BA. She went on to play for União Desportiva-AL, Chapecoense, Avaí/Kindermann, and Napoli within a short timespan. In 2019, she scored 8 goals in 6 matches for Kindermann to become the leading goalscorer of the 2019 Campeonato Catarinense de Futebol Feminino. Gomes spent her final stint playing domestically with Iranduba, signing for the club in January 2020.

At age 23, Gomes moved abroad for the first time, joining Spanish club CD Getafe. In her lone season with Getafe, she recorded 13 appearances and 7 goals. On 29 July 2021, Gomes moved to fellow Spanish team CD Badajoz, signing a one-year contract with the club. She went on to score 3 goals across 24 games, helping Badajoz secure promotion to the Spanish second division. However, Badajoz would later announce the dissolution of its women's first-team before such promotion occurred due to financial constraints.

=== Clube de Albergaria ===
Gomes then moved to Portugal, where she signed for Campeonato Nacional Feminino side Clube de Albergaria. In December 2022, she was a prominent figure in Albergaria's fight to evade relegation, scoring 3 goals in 2 matches. She continued to find offensive success into the second half of the season, leading the team in goals before teammate Samara Lino rivaled her tally in March 2023. On 22 July 2023, Clube de Albergaria announced the departure of Gomes at the conclusion of the season. Gomes had registered 9 goals in 25 matches in her single season at Albergaria, as well as multiple Player of the Match honors.

=== Cruz Azul ===
In July 2023, Gomes signed for Mexican Liga MX Femenil club Cruz Azul. She helped Cruz Azul get off to a fast start in the 2023 Apertura, recording three goals (two of which came in a single match) in the team's first three games to help Cruz Azul start the tournament with a trio of victories. It marked Cruz Azul's most successful opening start to a campaign since 2019. Gomes went on to score 5 more goals for Cruz Azul, finishing the 2023–24 season with a total of 8. The following season, she made 14 appearances (6 starts) and scored 4 times. She departed from Cruz Azul in May 2024.

=== Fort Lauderdale United ===
On 24 June 2024, American club Fort Lauderdale United FC announced that they had signed Gomes ahead of the USL Super League's inaugural season of play. Gomes made her Super League debut on 19 October 2024, coming on as a substitute in a 2–1 loss to Lexington SC. After making 6 appearances (2 starts) for Fort Lauderdale, Gomes parted ways with the club in March 2025.

=== CSKA Moscow ===
Russian Women's Football Championship club CSKA Moscow signed Gomes on 21 March 2025.
