= Carlee Giammona =

American soccer player (born 2000)

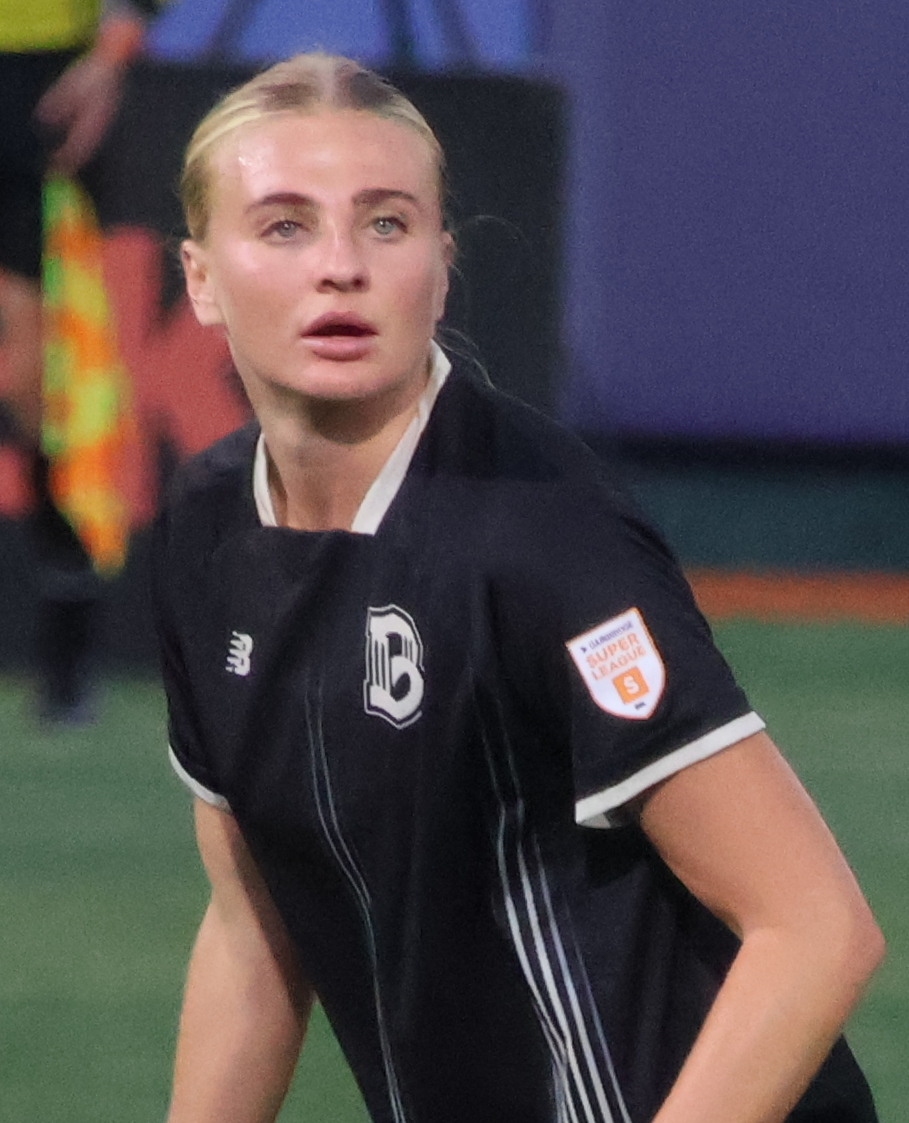
- Giammona with Brooklyn FC in 2026

Personal information
- Full name: Carlee Rose Giammona
- Date of birth: November 1, 2000 (age 25)
- Place of birth: Littleton, Colorado, United States
- Height: 1.70 m (5 ft 7 in)
- Positions: Midfielder; forward

Team information
- Current team: Brooklyn FC
- Number: 21

College career
Years	Team	Apps	(Gls)
2019	Alabama Crimson Tide	18	(3)
2020–2022	Pepperdine Waves	44	(16)

Senior career*
Years	Team	Apps	(Gls)
2023	Monterrey	34	(9)
2024	Glasgow City	11	(8)
2024–2026	Tampa Bay Sun	54	(12)
2026–	Brooklyn FC	1	(0)
- * Club domestic league appearances and goals as of 05:40, August 16, 2026 (UTC)

Carlee Rose Giammona (born November 1, 2000) is an American professional soccer player who plays as a midfielder or forward for USL Super League club Brooklyn FC. She played college soccer for the Alabama Crimson Tide and the Pepperdine Waves. She has previously been a member of Liga MX Femenil club Monterrey, Scottish Women's Premier League club Glasgow City, and USLS club Tampa Bay Sun FC.

== College career ==
=== Alabama Crimson Tide ===
Giammona started her collegiate career in 2019 playing at the University of Alabama. As a freshman, she started in 18 of 20 matches while also earning SEC All-Freshman Team honors. During the 2019 SEC tournament, Giammona provided the game winning assist in the 97th minute of overtime against in-state rival Auburn, sending Alabama to the quarterfinals where they eventually lost 1–2 against Vanderbilt. Overall, Giammona tallied three goals and two assists at Alabama, with one of her goals and both assists against Auburn.

=== Pepperdine Waves ===
Giammona transferred to Pepperdine in her sophomore season. She suffered a season ending injury four games into the season. Upon returning to the field In 2021, Giammona helped led the team to their first Round of 16 appearance since 2014 in the 2021 NCAA Tournament where they fell to Florida State 0–1. Giammona started in all 44 career games she played and contributed to six game-winning goals. She also earned All-WCC honors twice. She currently ranks in Pepperdine's top 10 for points and assists per game.

== Club career ==
=== Monterrey ===
After going undrafted in the 2023 NWSL Draft, Giammona signed her first professional contract with C.F. Monterrey with the club announcing the signing on February 6.

Giammona got her first professional appearance and start on February 28, 2023, playing the full 90 minutes in Monterrey's 3–0 victory over Necaxa. She scored her first professional and club goal a month later on March 19, scoring in the 10th minute of a 2–2 draw against Chivas. On September 11, 2023, against Santos Lagunas she recorder her first professional brace, and later recorded a second brace in a 6–3 victory over Tijuana, helping send Monterrey to the Apertura semi-finals, where they fell to eventual winners and rivals, Tigres. On December 25, 2023, Monterrey announced Giammona had departed the club.

=== Glasgow City ===
On January 31, 2024, on deadline day, Glasgow City announced they had signed Giammona on an 18 month long contract. Giammona made her first club appearance on February 7, 2024 against Hamilton Academical. She scored her first club goal four days later against Montrose.

=== Tampa Bay Sun ===
On June 14, 2024, Tampa Bay Sun FC announced the signing of Giammona for the inaugural 2024–25 USL Super League Season. She was in Tampa Bay's starting lineup for their inaugural match against Dallas Trinity on August 18, 2024 that ended in a 1–1 draw. Giammona scored her first club goal on September 8, 2024 and would go on to win the Team of the Month award for November 2024. She helped the Sun win the inaugural Super League championship after beating Fort Lauderdale United FC in the final.

In her second season in Tampa Bay, Giammona made 26 appearances as the Sun finished second-to-last in the Super League standings. She scored 5 goals, ranking second on the team behind Sydny Nasello. On June 15, 2026, almost exactly two years after her signing with the Sun was made official, Giammona was announced to be departing from the club.

=== Brooklyn FC ===
On August 6, 2026, it was announced that Giammona had signed for fellow Super League team Brooklyn FC. She made her club debut on August 15, 2026, earning the start in Brooklyn's season-opening defeat to Lexington SC.

== Career statistics ==
=== College ===
Team	Season	Regular season			Conference Tournament		NCAA Tournament		Total	
Team	Season	Division	Apps	Goals	Apps	Goals	Apps	Goals	Apps	Goals
Alabama Crimson Tide	2019	SEC	18	3	2	0	—		20	3
Alabama Crimson Tide	Total		18	3	2	0	0	0	20	3
Pepperdine Waves	2020–21	WCC	4	0	—		—		4	0
Pepperdine Waves	2021	WCC	19	5	—		3	2	22	7
Pepperdine Waves	2022	WCC	18	9	—		—		18	9
Pepperdine Waves	Total		41	14	2	0	3	2	44	16
Total			59	17	2	0	3	2	64	19

=== Club ===
As of match played March 26, 2026

Appearances and goals by club, season, and competition
Club	Season	League			League Cup		Playoffs		Total	
Club	Season	Division	Apps	Goals	Apps	Goals	Apps	Goals	Apps	Goals
CF Monterrey	2022–23	Liga MX Femenil	11	2	3	0	—		14	2
CF Monterrey	2023–24	Liga MX Femenil	16	5	4	2	—		20	7
Glasgow City	2023–24	Scottish Women's Premier League	11	8	0	0	—		11	8
Tampa Bay Sun FC	2024–25	USL Super League	28	7	—		2	1	30	8
Tampa Bay Sun FC	2025–26	USL Super League	19	4	—		0	0	19	4
Career total			85	26	7	2	2	1	94	31

== Honors ==
Tampa Bay Sun

- USL Super League: 2024–25
