= Suncoast Credit Union Field =

Soccer stadium in Tampa, Florida

- Interactive map of Suncoast Credit Union Field
- Former names: Riverfront Stadium (2024–2025)
- Address: Tampa, Florida
- Coordinates: 27.9592°N 82.4666°W
- Capacity: 5,000
- Surface: FIFA Grade Turf
- Public transit: HART route 7

Construction
- Renovated: 2024

Tenants
- Blake High School; Tampa Bay Sun (USLS) (2024–); Tampa Bay Mutiny (UPSL) (2025–)

Suncoast Credit Union Field (formerly Riverfront Stadium) is a soccer and American football stadium in Tampa, Florida, along the Hillsborough River.

== History ==
In 2023, it was announced that USL Super League team Tampa Bay Sun FC would play their first few seasons on the campus of Howard W. Blake High School. Plans were also revealed to bring the stadium's capacity from 1,800 up to 5,000.

The renovations began in February 2024 were completed in August ahead of the club's inaugural season.

The first match at the stadium was a closed-doors friendly between Tampa Bay Sun and USF. The first competitive match took place on August 18, 2024 between the Sun and Dallas Trinity FC.

On June 14, 2025 the stadium hosted the inaugural USL Super League Final between the Tampa Bay Sun and Fort Lauderdale United FC. The Sun would go onto win the game 1-0, being crowned champions of the 2024–25 USL Super League season.

Ahead of the club's 2025–26 season home opener, a partnership with Suncoast Credit Union was announced, which included naming rights to the stadium.

== Tenants ==
Tampa Bay Sun FC will play their first few seasons at the stadium while their permanent home is constructed. Additionally, the Blake High School soccer and football teams play at the stadium. The Tampa Bay Mutiny - unrelated to the earlier professional team - began United Premier Soccer League play at the stadium in fall 2025.
