= Training Facility at Nova Southeastern University =

Sports training facility

Amerant Bank Field, formerly Training Facility at Nova Southeastern University, Miami Dolphins Training Facility & Beyond Bancard Field, is located on the Nova Southeastern University main campus in Davie, Florida. It is the former headquarters location for the Miami Dolphins, as well as a location for frequent special events.

Amerant Bank Field has served has the home venue for Fort Lauderdale United FC's women's professional Gainbridge Super League side since its inaugural campaign in 2024. The stadium is set to be the home of the club's newly-announced men's professional USL League One team, kicking off in the spring of 2027.

== Architecture and features ==
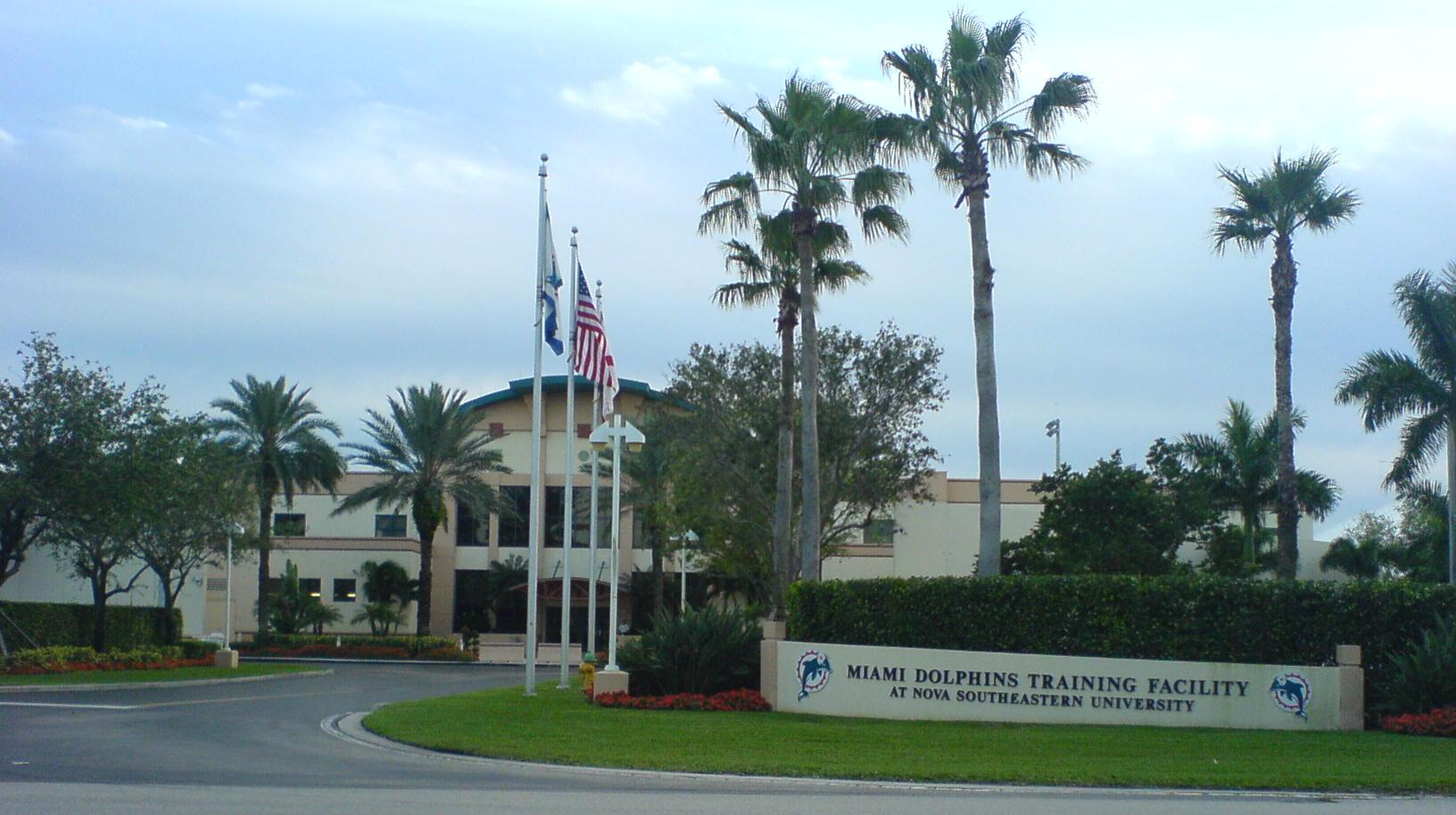
The former training facility of the Miami Dolphins

Bowing trusses and a profile reminiscent of classic athletic facilities define this state of the art training facility. It included a large weight room, training rooms, locker rooms, a therapy swimming pool, a cold plunge pool and whirlpools, numerous administrative offices, and a practice field. It also had a bleacher building, which accommodated 2,000 spectators. The 56,000-square-foot (5,200 m^{2}) facility was frequently used as a prototype for professional football teams.

There was also an indoor training field known as "The Bubble." The 96,600 square feet (8,970 m^{2}) indoor facility covered 2.2 acres (8,900 m^{2}) on the west side of the main building. The “bubble” was an air-supported structure manufactured and installed by Air Structures American Technologies Incorporated (ASATI) and constructed by Stiles Construction, the same corporation who worked on the expansion of Dolphin Stadium for Super Bowl XLI. The football field, installed by The Motz Group, was regulation size and made of synthetic turf consisting of 75% rubber and 25% sand to provide a firm-playing surface. Loud crowd noise could also be replicated in the bubble.

== History ==
The Dolphins trained at Saint Andrew's School in the late 1960s and St. Thomas University from July 12, 1970 until June 4, 1993. The ribbon cutting ceremony for the new training facility was July 11, 1993. The Dolphins left the Nova Southeastern University training facility in June 2021.

The facility is now owned and operated by NSU Sharks athletics, and professional soccer club Fort Lauderdale United FC currently hosts matches at the main stadium, with the men's team playing in the USL League One and the women's team playing in the USL Super League.

== The Bubble ==
The Bubble at the former training facility of the Miami Dolphins

On September 26, 2006 the Dolphins made their first significant expansion to the facility since it first opened with the opening of an air supported air conditioned indoor training field. The structure is 96,600 square feet (8,970 m^{2}) and is 72 feet (22 m) tall in the center. The current owner of the Bubble is Jamaican born Jerome Harriott, who leases it to the Dolphins. In 2018, Hellas Construction installed its Matrix Turf with Helix Technology along with organic infill made of coconut and cork fibers. The Dolphins are the first team to have organic infill.

“We’re proud to become the first professional football team in Florida to have such a venue. We believe it will help the team from a competitive standpoint as it will allow for closer game simulation during practice and allow the team to continue practicing even when storms roll in,” Bryan Wiedmeier, president of the Miami Dolphins, said.

The fabric used is extremely light, yet strong. Inflation is maintained via fans in the HVAC units through the integrated control system.

The structure was designed to withstand hurricane force winds up to category three. Internal air pressure is increased to "stiffen" the structure to withstand wind loading.

The bubble is used by the NSU University School Sharks for practice and scrimmages.

The Bubble was designed by its current owner and angel investor, Jerome Harriott. Harriott leases the facility to the organization.

== New training facility in Miami Gardens ==
The Dolphins announced plans to move its training facility from Davie to a new facility to be called Baptist Health Training Complex that will be located on the northwest side of Hard Rock Stadium in Miami Gardens, Florida. The move would bring Dolphins owner Stephen Ross’s total investment in his stadium property to more than $600 million since 2015.

Ross has spent a half-billion dollars on renovating Hard Rock Stadium, and funded the construction to host the Miami Open which began in 2019. The Miami Dolphins broke ground Tuesday August 20, 2019 on a $135 million state-of-the-art training complex and sports performance clinic next to Hard Rock Stadium. The new complex, which has 125,000 square feet, was completed in 2021.

== Super Bowl ==
The 2006 AFC Champion Indianapolis Colts used the facility while preparing for Super Bowl XLI. The other team, the NFC Champion Chicago Bears, used the Miami Hurricanes football facility at the University of Miami in Coral Gables, Florida.

The Kansas City Chiefs used the facility while preparing for Super Bowl LIV. The other team, the San Francisco 49ers, used the Miami Hurricanes football facility at the University of Miami.
