= Jasmine Hamid =

American soccer player (born 2001)

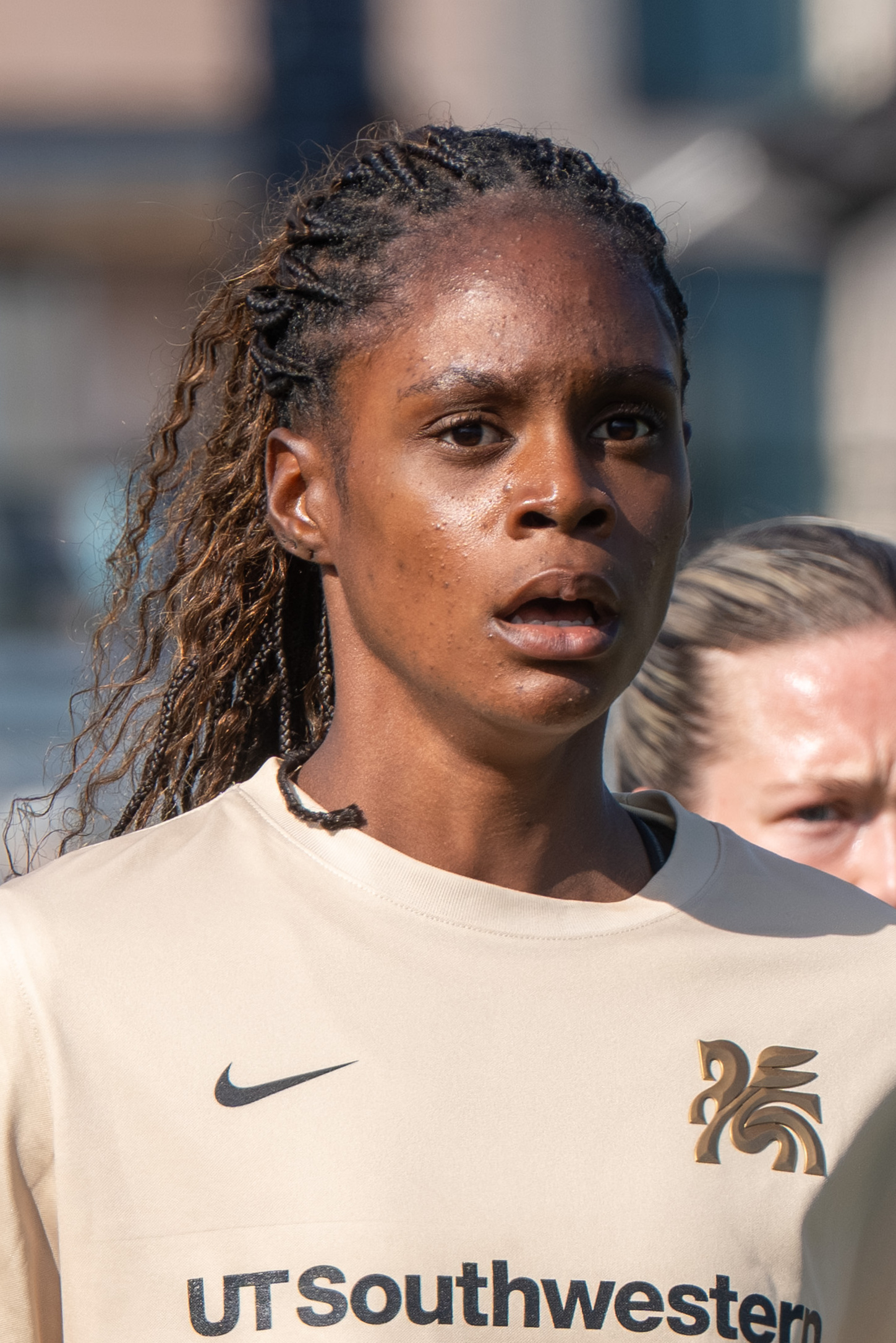
- Hamid with the Dallas Trinity in 2026

Personal information
- Full name: Ishata Jasmine Hamid
- Date of birth: October 5, 2001 (age 25)
- Height: 5 ft 6 in (1.68 m)
- Position: Forward

Team information
- Current team: Dallas Trinity
- Number: 17

Youth career
- FC Virginia DA

College career
Years	Team	Apps	(Gls)
2020–2021	George Mason Patriots	4	(0)
2021–2023	Towson Tigers	51	(23)

Senior career*
Years	Team	Apps	(Gls)
2022	Northern Virginia FC	6	(0)
2024	BK Häcken	2	(0)
2024–2026	Fort Lauderdale United	45	(13)
2026–	Dallas Trinity	7	(0)
- * Club domestic league appearances and goals as of 05:16, May 26, 2026 (UTC)

Ishata Jasmine Hamid (born October 5, 2001) is an American professional soccer player who plays as a forward for USL Super League club Dallas Trinity FC. She played college soccer for the George Mason Patriots and the Towson Tigers, earning third-team All-American honors in 2023. She has previously played for Fort Lauderdale United FC.

== Early life ==
A native of Alexandria, Virginia, Hamid played youth club soccer for FC Virginia DA. She attended Bishop Ireton High School, where she played varsity soccer across all four years and was a two-time WCAC Player of the Week recipient.

== College career ==
=== George Mason Patriots ===
Hamid joined the George Mason Patriots in 2020, but her freshman college season was pushed back to the Spring of 2021 due to the COVID-19 pandemic. She ended up registering 4 appearances (2 starts) across 245 minutes of soccer.

=== Towson Tigers ===
Hamid transferred to Towson University ahead of her sophomore year of college. In her first season with the Towson Tigers, she led the team with 6 assists and was named to the All-CAA second team.

In the offseason leading up to her junior year of college, Hamid played a season with Northern Virginia FC in the pre-professional USL W League. She played in 6 games and tallied 2 assists as Northern Virginia finished last in the Mid-Atlantic Division.

Upon returning to Towson for 2022, Hamid played and started in 16 of the Tigers' matches. She scored 6 goals and once again recorded 6 assists, despite missing part of the season with an injury. In her final season of college soccer, Hamid had a breakout season, being named to the All-American Third Team, CAA First Team, and All-East Region First Team. She led the Tigers with 14 goals, including 4 scored in a single match against UMBC on August 31, 2023. Hamid was also crowned the CAA Midfielder of Year and named the CAA Offensive Player of the Week on two separate occasions.

== Club career ==
=== BK Häcken ===
Originally, after leaving college, Hamid joined Bay FC as a preseason trialist in January 2024. She ultimately did not sign with Bay FC and instead inked a deal with Swedish club BK Häcken on the Damallsvenskan deadline day. Although she was only able to make 2 total appearances with the senior squad, Hamid earned playing time with Häcken's U-19 team and notably scored the late match winner in a victory over Malmö FF's U-19 squad on May 30, 2024. She departed from the club on June 20, one month before the expiration of her contract.

=== Fort Lauderdale United ===
Hamid signed with Fort Lauderdale United FC ahead of the inaugural USL Super League season. She started and played 62 minutes in Fort Lauderdale United's first-ever match, a 1–1 draw with Spokane Zephyr FC. She received her first USLS honor on October 3, 2024, being named to the league's September team of the month after scoring two goals in three games. Hamid continued to find success and was named the USL Super League's player of the month twice in a row. She also recorded a four-game scoring streak in the second half of the season.

In her second season with Fort Lauderdale, Hamid made 19 appearances (16 starts) and scored 4 goals. She was also a defensive contributor, ranking first on her team in interceptions and duels won. Her performances earned her two more USLS Team of the Month awards, first in October 2025, and then in February 2026. Upon departing from Fort Lauderdale United in April 2026, Hamid set team records in career goals, duels won, tackles won, and shots.

=== Dallas Trinity ===
On April 3, 2026, Fort Lauderdale United transferred Hamid to fellow Super League team Dallas Trinity FC in exchange for an undisclosed fee. Hamid made her Trinity debut the following day, coming on as a second-half substitute for Chioma Ubogagu in a 3–1 victory over the Spokane Zephyr. On May 16, 2026, she assisted Allie Thornton in a 4–0 final day victory over Hamid's former team, Fort Lauderdale United, to help Dallas clinch a playoff berth. In the Super League semifinals, Hamid started in the Trinity's 2–0 defeat to Players' Shield winners Lexington SC.

== Personal life ==
Hamid is the sister of 2014 MLS Goalkeeper of the Year and former United States men's national soccer team goalkeeper Bill Hamid.

== Career statistics ==
=== Club ===
As of May 26, 2026

Appearances and goals by club, season and competition
Club	Season	League			Cup (Note: Includes the Svenska Cupen)		Playoffs (Note: Includes USL Super League playoffs)		Total	
Club	Season	Division	Apps	Goals	Apps	Goals	Apps	Goals	Apps	Goals
Northern Virginia FC	2022	USL W League	6	0	—		—		6	0
BK Häcken	2023	Damallsvenskan	2	0	0	0	—		2	0
Fort Lauderdale United FC	2024–25	USL Super League	26	9	—		2	0	28	9
Fort Lauderdale United FC	2025–26	USL Super League	19	4	—		—		19	4
Fort Lauderdale United FC	Total		45	13	0	0	2	0	47	13
Dallas Trinity FC	2025–26	USL Super League	7	0	—		1	0	8	0
Career total			60	13	0	0	3	0	63	13
