= Vivianne Bessette =

Canadian soccer player (born 2002)

Personal information
- Date of birth: June 23, 2002 (age 24)
- Place of birth: Cowansville, Quebec, Canada
- Height: 1.73 m (5 ft 8 in)
- Position: Defender

Team information
- Current team: Tampa Bay Sun
- Number: 4

Youth career
- 2018–2020: Montverde Academy

College career
Years	Team	Apps	(Gls)
2020–2023	South Florida Bulls	64	(6)

Senior career*
Years	Team	Apps	(Gls)
2024–	Tampa Bay Sun	64	(1)

International career
2019	Bulgaria U-17	3	(0)
2020	Bulgaria U-19	3	(0)
2022–2023	Canada U-20	3	(0)
- * Club domestic league appearances and goals as of 00:47, November 7, 2026 (UTC)

Vivianne Bessette (born June 23, 2002) is a Canadian professional soccer player who plays as a defender for Tampa Bay Sun FC in the USL Super League. She has represented Canada at the under-20 level, and previously played in the youth international system for Bulgaria.

== Early life ==
Bessette comes from an athletic family and began playing soccer at age nine. Her mother, Daniela, was born in Sofia, the capital city of Bulgaria. She later attended Montverde Academy in Florida (through the Montverde International Futbol Club) for two years. During her time there she helped the team win a state championship and was ranked among the top high-school girls’ players in the U.S. at the time.

== College career ==
Bessette attended the University of South Florida (USF), joining the women's soccer program in 2020. In her freshman year she was selected as the American Athletic Conference (AAC) Rookie of the Week after a season-opening performance that included a goal and an assist, while also contributing defensively in a shutout. Over her collegiate career, Bessette earned multiple conference honours, including All-AAC First Team selections and All-Region recognitions.

== Club career ==
On April 29, 2024, Tampa Bay Sun FC announced the signing of Bessette ahead of the team's inaugural season in the USL Super League. In the 2024–25 season, she appeared in 30 matches for the club, establishing herself as a key defensive presence with statistics such as 128 clearances, 36 interceptions, 22 tackles won and 21 blocks. For her performances, she was named to the USL Super League Team of the Month for November 2024 and March 2025.

== International career ==
Initially representing Bulgaria at youth levels, Bessette switched allegiance to Canada and was named to the Canadian U-20 national team for the FIFA U-20 Women's World Cup Costa Rica 2022.

== Style of play ==
Bessette plays primarily as a centre-back and is noted for her tactical awareness, aerial ability, and composure on the ball. Canadian Soccer Daily described her as “spatially intelligent and calm on the ball ... vocal with teammates in front of her in the defensive line.”

== Personal life ==
Off the pitch, Bessette pursued a graduate degree in exercise science at the University of South Florida, with a concentration in strength and conditioning. She enjoys going to the beach and baking. She is multilingual, speaking three languages, and lists Christmas as her favourite holiday.

== Honours & recognition ==
USL Super League

- Team of the Month: November 2024, March 2025

American Athletic Conference

- All-Rookie Team: 2020
- All-Conference First Team: 2020
- All-Tournament Team: 2021
- All-Conference First Team: 2021, 2022
- All-Conference Second Team: 2023

United Soccer Coaches

- All-Region First Team: 2020
- All-Region Second Team: 2021
- All-Region Third Team: 2023

Top Drawer Soccer

- No. 19 on Top-100 Freshman: 2020
- Best XI Freshman Second Team: 2020
