= Laveni Vaka =

Tongan-American soccer player

Personal information
- Full name: Laveni Chantelle Vaka
- Date of birth: August 11, 2001 (age 25)
- Place of birth: Sandy, Utah, United States
- Height: 5 ft 6 in (1.68 m)
- Position: Defender

Team information
- Current team: Santos Laguna
- Number: 4

Youth career
- Bombers Elite

College career
Years	Team	Apps	(Gls)
2019–2023	BYU Cougars	97	(0)

Senior career*
Years	Team	Apps	(Gls)
2024–2026	Fort Lauderdale United	31	(0)
2026–	Santos Laguna	0	(0)

International career
2014	United States U14		
2018–	Tonga	5	(1)
- * Club domestic league appearances and goals as of 03:37, 18 May 2026 (UTC)

Laveni Chantelle Vaka (born August 11, 2001) is a professional footballer who plays as a defender for Liga MX Femenil club Santos Laguna. Born in the United States, she plays for the Tonga national team. She has previously played for USL Super League club Fort Lauderdale United FC.

== Club career ==
Vaka played college soccer for the BYU Cougars in the United States. She was drafted by Bay FC in the fourth round of the 2024 NWSL Draft on January 12, 2024. Vaka was subsequently not signed to Bay FC ahead of their 2024 season.

She signed with Fort Lauderdale United FC in May 2024, becoming the first Tongan professional female soccer player. She started all 18 of Fort Lauderdale United's matches before sustaining an ACL injury in March 2025. She returned to the pitch in the 2025–26 season, where she started in all but one of her 13 appearances.

In July 2026, Vaka joined Mexican Liga MX Femenil club Santos Laguna ahead of the 2026 Apertura.

== International career ==
Vaka attended training camp with the United States under-14 team in 2014.

She represents the Tonga national team.

== Personal life ==
Vaka's twin sister, Daviana, is also a professional soccer player. Daviana played briefly for Fort Lauderdale United FC during the 2024–25 season, becoming the second ever Tongan professional female soccer player after Laveni. Daviana also represents the Tonga national team at the international level.

== Honors ==
Individual

- NCAA Division I First-Team All-America: 2023
