= Cecilie Fløe =

Danish footballer (born 2001)

Personal information
- Full name: Cecilie Fløe Nielsen
- Date of birth: 8 October 2001 (age 25)
- Place of birth: Fredericia, Denmark
- Height: 1.74 m (5 ft 9 in)
- Position: Forward

Team information
- Current team: VfL Wolfsburg
- Number: 13

Youth career
- 2006–2013: Erritsø GIF
- 2013–2016: Middelfart Boldklub
- 2016–2017: Efterskolen ved Nyborg
- 2018–2019: OB Q

College career
Years	Team	Apps	(Gls)
2017–2018	Montverde Academy		

Senior career*
Years	Team	Apps	(Gls)
2019–2020	OB Q	13	(7)
2020–2021	KoldingQ	28	(10)
2021–2024	HB Køge	72	(32)
2024–2025	Tampa Bay Sun	19	(8)
2025–2026	Napoli	22	(11)
2026–	VfL Wolfsburg	4	(2)

International career^{‡}
2019–2020	Denmark U19	7	(1)
2023–	Denmark U23	12	(5)
2021–	Denmark	10	(2)
- * Club domestic league appearances and goals as of 22 November 2026 ‡ National team caps and goals as of 9 June 2026

Cecilie Fløe Nielsen (born 8 October 2001) is a Danish professional footballer who plays as a striker for Frauen-Bundesliga club VfL Wolfsburg and the Denmark national team. She has previously played for Danish A-Liga clubs Odense Boldklub Q, KoldingQ and HB Køge, as well as USL Super League club Tampa Bay Sun FC and Serie A club Napoli.

== College career ==
In June 2017, Fløe joined the football program at Montverde Academy. She found out about the academy when she played a friendly match against them with Efterskolen ved Nyborg when they toured Florida.

In February 2021, it was announced that Fløe would join the American team SMU Mustangs who represent Southern Methodist University located in University Park, Texas. However, in the end she decided not to move to the United States, signing instead for Danish club HB Køge.

== Club career ==
Fløe started playing football in kindergarten when her parents bought her boots. In 2006 she started playing with Erritsø GIF, where she played 9 years before moving to Middelfart Boldklub and after that to Efterskolen ved Nyborg.

In May 2019, Fløe made her debut senior appearance for Odense Boldklub Q, having played for the under-18 team. She scored a brace in a 3–3 draw with Nordsjælland at Right to Dream Park and was voted Player of the Match. After scoring four goals, Fløe was named Player of the Month in September 2019.

In January 2020, Fløe joined KoldingQ, signing a 1.5-year contract.

In June 2021, Fløe signed a three-year contract with HB Køge, with director Per Rud believing she has a clear future as a top Danish women's football talent. She scored 32 league goals in 72 appearances during her three seasons at the club. In September 2023, she became the club's all-time top scorer, after scoring her 38th goal in all competitions.

Fløe signed with American club Tampa Bay Sun in June 2024, ahead of the inaugural USL Super League season. On June 14, 2025, she scored in the 100th minute of the inaugural USL Super League final, the lone goal in a 1–0 extra-time win against Fort Lauderdale United.

On 18 July 2025, Fløe joined Italian club Napoli. She scored 11 goals in her sole season with the club, ranking third on the Serie A goals leaderboard for the 2025–26 season

In June 2026, Frauen-Bundesliga club VfL Wolfsburg signed Fløe to a four-year contract through 2030.

== International career ==
Fløe represented the Danish under-17 team at the 2019 UEFA Women's Under-17 Championship in Bulgaria. In June 2019, she was called up to the Danish under-19 team for friendly matches against England.

Fløe made her senior debut for Denmark on 26 October 2021, coming on as an 76th-minute substitute for Sofie Junge Pedersen in a 5–1 win against Montenegro in the 2023 FIFA Women's World Cup qualifying cycle. Fløe made a return to the selection in 2025 under new manager Jakob Michelsen. Fløe's first turn in the starting line-up saw her produce two assists to win the 14 April 2026 World Cup qualification match against Sweden. She scored her first goal for Denmark in a 2–1 win against Sweden in the penultimate match in the 2027 World Cup qualification.

== International goals ==
No.	Date	Venue	Opponent	Score	Result	Competition
1.	5 June 2026	Odense Stadium, Odense, Denmark	Sweden	1–0	2–1	2027 FIFA Women's World Cup qualification
2.	9 June 2026	Serbian FA Sports Center, Stara Pazova, Serbia	Serbia	1–0	4–1	2027 FIFA Women's World Cup qualification

== Style of play ==
Fløe is a physically strong and fast player, allowing her to compete well for duels. She also has good offensive positioning and a lot of energy on the field.

== Honors ==
Tampa Bay Sun

- USL Super League Champion: 2024–25

Individual

- Serie A Team of the Season: 2025–26
