= Sh'Nia Gordon =

American soccer player

Personal information
- Full name: Sh'Nia Demetrice Gordon
- Date of birth: April 9, 1997 (age 29)
- Place of birth: Ocklawaha, Florida, U.S.
- Height: 5 ft 7 in (1.70 m)
- Positions: Right back; forward

Team information
- Current team: Fort Lauderdale United
- Number: 11

Youth career
- D'Feeters
- Gwinnett SA
- Richmond Hill HS

College career
Years	Team	Apps	(Gls)
2015–2019	West Virginia Mountaineers	95	(25)

Senior career*
Years	Team	Apps	(Gls)
2019–2020	FC Metz	16	(3)
2020–2021	Dijon FCO	22	(7)
2021–2022	CSKA Moscow	8	(0)
2022	Racing Louisville	4	(0)
2022–2023	Le Havre	18	(4)
2023–2024	Montpellier	19	(1)
2024–	Fort Lauderdale United	56	(7)
- * Club domestic league appearances and goals as of 03:34, May 18, 2026 (UTC)

Sh'Nia Demetrice Gordon (born April 9, 1997) is an American professional soccer player who plays as a right back or forward for Fort Lauderdale United of the USL Super League.

== Youth career ==
Gordon played for Elite Clubs National League teams D'Feeters of Dallas, Texas, and Gwinnett SA of Gwinnett County, Georgia. She was ranked 52nd in the 2015 Girls IMG Academy 150 player rankings, fifth among forwards in the Texas region, and 22nd among forwards nationally. Gordon also played high school soccer for Richmond Hill High School, where she scored a school-record 59 goals as a senior, and scored 34 goals in 13 matches as a junior.

== College career ==
Gordon appeared in 95 matches for the West Virginia Mountaineers women's soccer team, starting in all of them, and scored 25 goals and 15 assists. As a sophomore in 2016, Gordon was named to the NCAA College Cup All-Tournament Team and Big 12 All-Tournament Team.

== Club career ==
=== FC Metz ===
Inspired by her West Virginia teammates Ashley Lawrence and Kadeisha Buchanan, who played professionally after college at Paris Saint-Germain and Olympique Lyonnais, respectively, Gordon also planned to play professionally in France. She also entered the 2019 NWSL College Draft but was not selected. FC Metz extended her an offer, and she accepted and played with the team until its relegation to Division 2 Féminine after the 2019–20 season.

=== Dijon FCO ===
Following FC Metz's relegation, Gordon joined Dijon FCO on a two-year contract. She played for Dijon in the 2020–21 Division 1 Féminine season, where she scored seven goals in 22 league appearances.

=== CSKA Moscow ===
In August 2021, CSKA Moscow bought Gordon's contract from Dijon FCO, where she played until the 2022 Russian invasion of Ukraine, which started while the team was training in Turkey. One of her matches with CSKA Moscow was a 2021–22 UEFA Women's Champions League qualification match against Apollon Ladies F.C., then managed by Kim Björkegren.

=== Racing Louisville FC ===
With special dispensation granted from FIFA to foreign players to void overseas contracts due to the invasion, Gordon accepted a two-year contract offer on March 15, 2022, from Björkegren, now Racing Louisville FC's head coach, who was also familiar with Gordon during her career in France. CSKA Moscow had reportedly requested a large transfer fee prior to FIFA's contract exception. Gordon's move was so sudden that she left clothing and personal items behind in Russia. She debuted for Racing on March 25, 2022, as a substitute in the 80th minute of a 2022 NWSL Challenge Cup match against Houston Dash.

On July 27, 2022, Racing Louisville FC announced that Gordon had mutually terminated her contract with the club to pursue playing opportunities in Europe.

== Career statistics ==
=== Club ===
As of match played March 28, 2026

Appearances and goals by club, season and competition
Club	Season	League			League Cup		Domestic Cup (Note: Includes appearances in Coupe de France Féminine and NWSL Challenge Cup)		Continental (Note: Includes appearances in UEFA Women's Champions League)		Total	
Club	Season	Division	Apps	Goals	Apps	Goals	Apps	Goals	Apps	Goals	Apps	Goals
FC Metz	2019–20	Division 1 Féminine	16	3	—		—		—		16	3
Dijon FCO	2020–21	Division 1 Féminine	22	7	—		1	0	—		23	7
CSKA Moscow	2021	Russian Women's Football Championship	8	0	—		—		2	0	10	0
Racing Louisville FC	2022	NWSL	4	0	—		3	0	—		7	0
Le Havre	2022–23	Division 1 Féminine	18	4	—		1	0	—		19	4
Montpellier	2023–24	Division 1 Féminine	19	1	—		—		—		19	1
Fort Lauderdale United FC	2024–25	USL Super League	28	5	2 (Note: Includes appearances in USL Super Cup play-offs)	0	—		—		28	0
Fort Lauderdale United FC	2025–26	USL Super League	19	0	—		—		—		19	0
Career total			134	20	2	0	5	0	2	0	143	20
