= Cosette Morché =

American soccer player (born 1997)

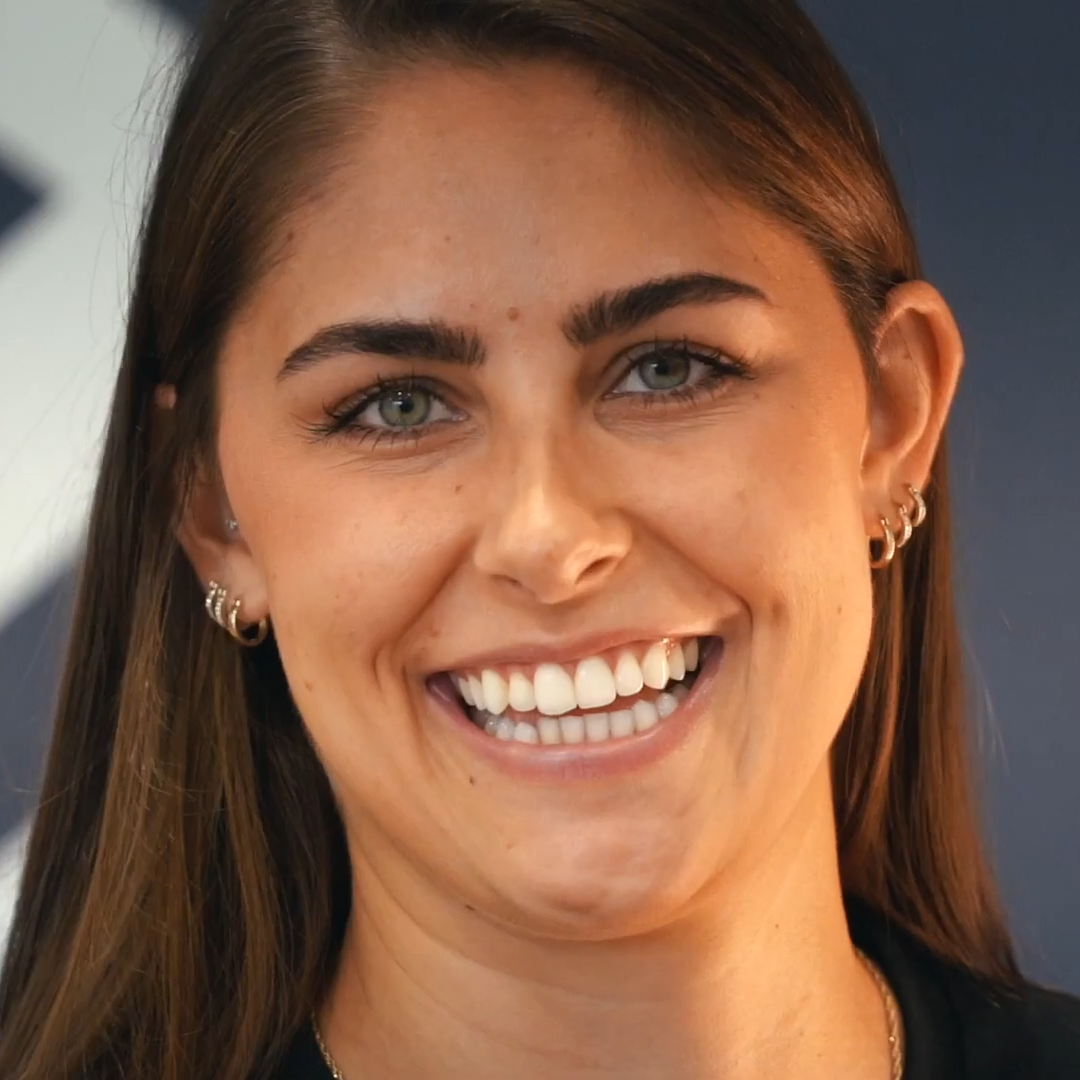
- Morché in 2023

Personal information
- Full name: Cosette Jolee Morché
- Date of birth: June 9, 1997 (age 29)
- Place of birth: Lawrenceville, Georgia, United States
- Height: 1.88 m (6 ft 2 in)
- Position: Goalkeeper

Team information
- Current team: Orlando Pride
- Number: 77

College career
Years	Team	Apps	(Gls)
2015–2016	Louisiana–Lafayette Ragin' Cajuns	30	(0)
2017–2018	Texas A&M Aggies	45	(0)

Senior career*
Years	Team	Apps	(Gls)
2019–2020	Eskilstuna United	10	(0)
2021	OL Reign	0	(0)
2021–2022	GPSO 92 Issy	20	(0)
2022–2023	Valencia	4	(0)
2023–2024	Montpellier	6	(0)
2024–2025	Fort Lauderdale United	22	(0)
2025–	Orlando Pride	10	(0)
- * Club domestic league appearances and goals as of 03:27, November 8, 2026 (UTC)

Cosette Jolee Morché (born June 9, 1997) is an American professional soccer player who plays as a goalkeeper for the Orlando Pride of the National Women's Soccer League (NWSL). She played college soccer for the Louisiana–Lafayette Ragin' Cajuns and the Texas A&M Aggies. She previously played for Eskilstuna United in the Damallsvenskan, GPSO 92 Issy and Montpellier in the Division 1 Féminine, Valencia in Liga F, and Fort Lauderdale United in the USL Super League.

== Club career ==
Morché signed with the Damallsvenskan club Eskilstuna United in 2019. She made her professional debut against Linköping on July 19, 2020.

On December 4, 2020, the NWSL's OL Reign announced that they had signed Morché to a one-year contract with the club option for another year. On July 26, 2021, the Reign exercised the contract option and sent Morché to Division 1 Féminine club GPSO 92 Issy on a season-long loan. On March 3, 2022, the loan was made permanent.

On June 28, 2022, Morché signed with Liga F club Valencia on a two-year contract.

On July 7, 2023, she returned to the Division 1 Féminine and signed with Montpellier. She was the second American goalkeeper to play for the club after Casey Murphy.

On June 13, 2024, Morché came back stateside and signed with USL Super League club Fort Lauderdale United before the league's inaugural season.

On August 6, 2025, she returned to the NWSL and signed with the Orlando Pride.

== Honors ==
Texas A&M Aggies

- SEC women's soccer tournament: 2017
