= ASUN women's soccer tournament =

American college soccer tournament

- Atlantic Sun Conference women's soccer championship
- Sport: College soccer
- Conference: Atlantic Sun Conference
- Number of teams: 8
- Format: Single-elimination
- Current stadium: Campus sites
- Played: 1994–present
- Last contest: 2026
- Current champion: Lipscomb (6th title)
- Most championships: Florida Gulf Coast & UCF (8)
- TV partner: ESPN+
- Official website: asunsports.org/wsoc

The ASUN Women's Soccer Tournament is the conference championship tournament in college soccer for the Atlantic Sun Conference (previously the Trans America Athletic Conference). The tournament has been held every year since 1994. It is a single-elimination tournament and seeding is based on regular season records.

The winner, declared conference champion, receives the conference's automatic bid to the NCAA Division I women's soccer championship. The tournament has had different setups in its history with only four teams qualifying for the tournament from 1994 to 1997, six teams qualifying from 1998 to 2019, to the now eight qualifying teams.

Florida Gulf Coast and UCF are the most winning teams of the competition, with 8 titles each.

== Champions ==
The following is a list of ASUN tournament winners:

=== Finals ===
Key

- (1) – Title number
- a.e.t. – Match went to extra time
- p – Match decided by a penalty shootout after extra time
- – Winning team won regular season

=== Finals ===
Ed.	Year	Champion	Score	Runner-up	Site	Most valuable player	Ref.
1	1994	UCF (1)	2–0	FIU	UCF Soccer Stadium • Orlando, Fl	Amy Geltz, UCF	
2	1995	UCF (2)	1–0	Campbell	Eakes Complex • Buies Creek, NC	Liz Shaw, UCF	
3	1996	UCF (3)	1–0	FIU	FIU Soccer Stadium • Miami, Fl	Kara Fitzgerald, Georgia State	
4	1997	Georgia State (1)	2–0	UCF	GSU Soccer Field • Atlanta, GA	Ana-Kaisa Molianen, Georgia State	
5	1998	UCF (4)	1–0	Jacksonville	UCF Soccer Stadium • Orlando, Fl	Alyssa O'Brien, UCF	
6	1999	UCF (5)	4–1	Jacksonville	UCF Soccer Stadium • Orlando, Fl	Cally Howell, UCF	
7	2000	Jacksonville (1)	2–1	FAU	FAU Soccer Stadium • Boca Raton, Fl	Karen Novak, Jacksonville	
8	2001	UCF (6)	2–1	FAU	UCF Soccer Stadium • Orlando, Fl	Michelle Anderson, UCF	
9	2002	UCF (7)	3–2	Jacksonville	Eakes Complex • Buies Creek, NC	Allison Blagriff, UCF	
10	2003	UCF (8)	2–2 (3–0 p)	FAU	FAU Soccer Stadium • Boca Raton, Fl	Allison Blagriff, UCF	
11	2004	Campbell (1)	0–0 (3–1 p)	UCF	Eakes Complex • Buies Creek, NC	Erin Switalski, Campbell	
12	2005	FAU (1)	2–0	Campbell	Greene Stadium • Boiling Springs, NC	Alicia Tirelli, FAU	
13	2006	Jacksonville (2)	1–0	Stetson	Fifth Third Stadium • Kennesaw, GA	Michelle Kmiotek, Jacksonville	
14	2007	Kennesaw State (1)	2–1	Mercer	Fifth Third Stadium • Kennesaw, GA	Caitlin Dingle, Kennesaw State	
15	2008	Belmont (1)	0–0 (2–1 p)	Mercer	Fifth Third Stadium • Kennesaw, GA	Sari Lin, Belmont	
16	2009	Kennesaw State (2)	2–1	Belmont	Fifth Third Stadium • Kennesaw, GA	Staci Pugh, Kennesaw State	
17	2010	Mercer (1)	1–0	Jacksonville	Southern Oak Stadium • Jacksonville, Fl	Olivia Tucker, Mercer	
18	2011	Florida Gulf Coast (1)	1–0 (a.e.t.)	Mercer	FGCU Complex • Fort Myers, Fl	Shannen Wacker, Florida Gulf Coast	
19	2012	Florida Gulf Coast (2)	1–0 (a.e.t.)	Mercer	FGCU Complex • Fort Myers, Fl	Ally Kasun, Florida Gulf Coast	
20	2013	Jacksonville (3)	0–0 (5–3 p)	Florida Gulf Coast	FGCU Complex • Fort Myers, Fl	Tabby Tindell, Florida Gulf Coast	
21	2014	Florida Gulf Coast (3)	3–1	Kennesaw State	FGCU Complex • Fort Myers, Fl	Tabby Tindell, Florida Gulf Coast	
22	2015	Florida Gulf Coast (4)	5–0	Lipscomb	FGCU Complex • Fort Myers, Fl	Tabby Tindell, Florida Gulf Coast	
23	2016	Florida Gulf Coast (5)	2–0	Lipscomb	FGCU Complex • Fort Myers, Fl	Ali Rogers, Florida Gulf Coast	
24	2017	Florida Gulf Coast (6)	3–2 (a.e.t.)	Lipscomb	Lipscomb Soccer Complex • Nashville, TN		
25	2018	Lipscomb (1)	3–2	North Alabama	Lipscomb Soccer Complex • Nashville, TN	Maycie McKay, Lipscomb	
26	2019	Lipscomb (2)	1–1 (4–3 p)	Kennesaw State	Lipscomb Soccer Complex • Nashville, TN	Melissa Gray, Lipscomb	
27	2020	Liberty (1)	1–0 (a.e.t.)	Kennesaw State	Fifth Third Stadium • Kennesaw, GA		
28	2021	Lipscomb (3)	1–0	Kennesaw State	Lipscomb Soccer Complex • Nashville, TN	Shelby Craft, Lipscomb	
29	2022	Florida Gulf Coast (7)	1–1 (4–3 p)	Liberty	FGCU Complex • Fort Myers, Fl	Katie Sullivan, Florida Gulf Coast	
30	2023	Florida Gulf Coast (8)	3–3 (3–2 p)	North Alabama	FGCU Complex • Fort Myers, Fl	Erika Zschuppe, Florida Gulf Coast	
31	2024	Lipscomb (4)	1–0	Eastern Kentucky	FGCU Complex • Fort Myers, Fl	Kiara Pralle, Lipscomb	
32	2025	Lipscomb (5)	3–0	North Florida	FGCU Complex • Fort Myers, Fl	Bella Carapazza, Lipscomb	
33	2026	Lipscomb (6)	1–0	Florida Gulf Coast	FGCU Complex • Fort Myers, Fl	Sunnie Woodard, Lipscomb	

=== By school ===
As of 2026 tournament

School	Apps.	Last App	W	L	T	Perc.	Finals	Titles	Title Years
Austin Peay	2	2024	0	0	2	.500	0	0	—
Bellarmine	5	2026	1	5	2	.250	0	0	—
Central Arkansas	4	2024	0	4	1	.100	0	0	—
Eastern Kentucky	5	2025	4	4	2	.500	1	0	—
Florida Gulf Coast	16	2026	20	5	5	.750	10	8	2011, 2012, 2014, 2015, 2016, 2017, 2022, 2023
Jacksonville	24	2026	17	19	8	.477	7	3	2000, 2006, 2013
Kennesaw State	17	2023	13	13	6	.500	6	2	2007, 2009
Lipscomb	14	2026	18	7	2	.704	9	6	2018, 2019, 2021; 2024, 2025, 2026
North Alabama	4	2025	3	3	1	.500	0	0	—
North Florida	14	2026	5	11	2	.333	1	0	—
Queens	2	2025	0	2	1	.167	0	0	—
Stetson	15	2020	6	14	2	.318	1	0	—
West Florida	1	2026	0	1	0	.000	0	0	—

Note: This list only includes current members of the ASUN.
