= 2022 ASUN women's soccer tournament =

American college soccer tournament

- Classification: Division I
- Teams: 8
- Matches: 7
- Attendance: 2,682
- Site: Campus Sites, higher seed
- Champions: Florida Gulf Coast (7th title)
- Winning coach: Jim Blankenship (7th title)
- MVP: Katie Sullivan (Florida Gulf Coast)
- Broadcast: ESPN+

2022 ASUN Conference women's soccer standings
| | Conf. | | | | | | Overall |
| Team | W | | L | | T | PCT | W | | L | | T | PCT |
|---|---|---|---|---|---|---|---|---|---|---|---|---|
| Liberty ‍†‍‍ | 8 | – | 0 | – | 2 | .900 | 14 | – | 3 | – | 4 | .762 |
| Florida Gulf Coast ‍‍‡‍^{y} | 8 | – | 1 | – | 1 | .850 | 12 | – | 6 | – | 2 | .650 |
| Lipscomb ‍‍‍ | 8 | – | 1 | – | 1 | .850 | 11 | – | 5 | – | 3 | .658 |
| Kennesaw St. ‍‍‍ | 5 | – | 3 | – | 2 | .600 | 7 | – | 9 | – | 3 | .447 |
| Eastern Kentucky ‍‍‍ | 4 | – | 4 | – | 2 | .500 | 9 | – | 7 | – | 2 | .556 |
| Central Arkansas ‍‍‍ | 4 | – | 4 | – | 2 | .500 | 6 | – | 9 | – | 4 | .421 |
| North Florida ‍‍‍ | 3 | – | 3 | – | 4 | .500 | 4 | – | 7 | – | 5 | .406 |
| Jacksonville ‍‍‍ | 3 | – | 4 | – | 3 | .450 | 6 | – | 5 | – | 5 | .531 |
| Queens ‍‍‍ | 3 | – | 5 | – | 2 | .400 | 3 | – | 8 | – | 5 | .344 |
| Stetson ‍‍‍ | 3 | – | 6 | – | 1 | .350 | 6 | – | 11 | – | 1 | .361 |
| Bellarmine ‍‍‍ | 1 | – | 4 | – | 5 | .350 | 1 | – | 7 | – | 9 | .324 |
| North Alabama ‍‍‍ | 2 | – | 6 | – | 2 | .300 | 5 | – | 8 | – | 5 | .417 |
| Austin Peay ‍‍‍ | 1 | – | 6 | – | 3 | .250 | 3 | – | 9 | – | 6 | .333 |
| Jacksonville State ‍‍‍ | 1 | – | 7 | – | 2 | .200 | 3 | – | 13 | – | 2 | .222 |
† – Conference champion ‡ – 2022 ASUN Tournament champion y – Invited to the NCAA Tournament; As of December 6, 2022; Rankings from United Soccer Coaches Poll; Source:Atlantic Sun Conference

The 2022 ASUN women's soccer tournament was the postseason women's soccer tournament for the ASUN Conference held from October 27 through November 4, 2022. The tournament was hosted at campus sites, with the #1 seed hosting two Quarterfinals and one Semifinal while the #2 seed hosted the other two Quarterfinals and Semifinal. The highest remaining seed hosted the final. The eight-team single-elimination tournament consisted of three rounds based on seeding from regular season conference play. The Lipscomb Bison were the defending tournament champions, and unable to defend their title, losing to Central Arkansas in a penalty-shoot out in the Quarterfinals. The Florida Gulf Coast Eagles won the tournament after defeating Liberty 4–3 in a penalty shoot-out in the final. It was Florida Gulf Coast's seventh overall title and first since 2017. All of the Eagle's titles have come under coach Jim Blankenship. As tournament champions, Florida Gulf Coast earned the ASUN's automatic berth into the 2022 NCAA Division I women's soccer tournament.

== Seeding ==
The top eight teams in the regular season earned a spot in the tournament. The top seed hosted two of the four Quarterfinals and one Semifinal, while the second seed hosted the other two Quarterfinals and Semifinal. The highest remaining seed hosted the final. Two tiebreakers were required to determine seeding for the tournament. A tiebreaker between Florida Gulf Coast and Lipscomb was required to determine the second and third seeds as both teams finished the regular season with identical 8–1–1 records. Florida Gulf Coast earned the second seed, and hosting privileges, due to a 2–1 victory over Lipscomb on October 13, 2022. A tiebreaker between Eastern Kentucky and Central Arkansas was required to determine the fifth and sixth seeds as both teams finished the regular season with identical 4–4–2 conference records. Eastern Kentucky earned the fifth seed by virtue of their 3–2 regular season win versus Central Arkansas on September 18, 2022.

| Seed | School | Conference Record | Points |
|---|---|---|---|
| 1 | Liberty | 8–0–2 | 26 |
| 2 | Florida Gulf Coast | 8–1–1 | 25 |
| 3 | Lipscomb | 8–1–1 | 25 |
| 4 | Kennesaw State | 5–3–2 | 17 |
| 5 | Eastern Kentucky | 4–4–2 | 14 |
| 6 | Central Arkansas | 4–4–2 | 14 |
| 7 | North Florida | 3–3–4 | 13 |
| 8 | Jacksonville | 3–4–3 | 12 |

== Bracket ==
Quarterfinals; Thursday, October 27
1 | Liberty | 3
8 | Jacksonville | 0
4 | Kennesaw State | 0
5 | Eastern Kentucky | 1
3 | Lipscomb | 1 (4)
6 | Central Arkansas (pen.) | 1 (5)
2 | Florida Gulf Coast | 1
7 | North Florida | 0

Semifinals; Sunday, October 30
1 | Liberty | 3
5 | Eastern Kentucky | 1
6 | Central Arkansas | 2
2 | Florida Gulf Coast (a.e.t.) | 3

Final; Friday, November 4
1 | Liberty | 1 (3)
2 | Florida Gulf Coast (pen.) | 1 (4)

== Schedule ==
=== Quarterfinals ===
| October 27 | #1 Liberty | 3–0 | #8 Jacksonville | Lynchburg, VA |
| 4:00 p.m. | McKinley Burkett 2'; Saydie Holland 68', 72' | Report | | Stadium: Osborne Stadium; Attendance: 0 Referee: Mike Stutt; Assistant referees: Kevin Mauer; Robert Velbis; Fourth official: Otto Leon |

| October 27 | #3 Lipscomb | 1–1 (a.e.t.) (4–5 p) | #6 Central Arkansas | Fort Myers, FL |
| 4:00 p.m. | Kelli Beiler 34'; Kendall Wade (yellow card) 67' | Report | 6' Taylor Lassiter | Stadium: FGCU Soccer Complex; Attendance: 175; Referee: Jaime Herrera; Assistant referees: Raidel Andino; Corbin Goodyear; Fourth official: Irvin Castilla-Quijano |
| | Penalties |
| | Emily Patti (penalty scored); Kelli Beiler (penalty scored); Emanuela Schurch (penalty missed); Faith Adams (penalty scored); Kendall Wade (penalty scored); Alivia Carapazza (penalty missed); Kale'a Perry (penalty missed); Grace Oliver (penalty missed) | | (penalty scored) Taylor Webb; (penalty missed) Abby Gibson; (penalty scored) Kelly Van Gundy; (penalty scored) Lea Duus Madsen; (penalty scored) Emily Wissel-Littmann; (penalty missed) Maria Vanegas; (penalty missed) Taylor Lassiter; (penalty scored) Nina Mazzola |

| October 27 | #2 Florida Gulf Coast | 1–0 | #7 North Florida | Fort Myers, FL |
| 7:00 p.m. | Margaret Berry 74'; Nellie Nygren (yellow card) 90' | Report | | Stadium: FGCU Soccer Complex; Attendance: 456; Referee: Wesley Costa; Assistant referees: Kevin Klinger; Jonathan Stone; Fourth official: Sergio Cabrera |

| October 27 | #4 Kennesaw State | 0–1 | #5 Eastern Kentucky | Lynchburg, VA |
| 7:00 p.m. | | Report | 24' Maddy Lemery; (yellow card) 57' Celia Lopez | Stadium: Osborne Stadium; Attendance: 386; Referee: Otto Leon; Assistant referees: John Seibold; Rick Rogers; Fourth official: Mike Stutt |

=== Semifinals ===
| October 30 | #1 Liberty | 3–1 | #5 Eastern Kentucky | Lynchburg, VA |
| 1:00 p.m. | Chloe Marr 33', 34'; Rachel DeRuby 63' | Report | 6' Gretta Gunn; (yellow card) 54' Maia Ransom | Stadium: Osborne Stadium; Attendance: 438; Referee: JC Griggs; Assistant referees: Kevin Uitto; Caleb Perry; Fourth official: Richard Crowgey |

| October 30 | #2 Florida Gulf Coast | 3–2 (a.e.t.) | #6 Central Arkansas | Fort Myers, FL |
| 2:00 p.m. | Marla Gaudlitz 56'; Leah Scarpelli 84'; Libby Helverson (yellow card) 94'; Erika Zschuppe 104' | Report | 64' Anna Kerr; 86' Tristyn Pavatt | Stadium: FGCU Soccer Complex; Attendance: 263; Referee: Daniel Radford; Assistant referees: Marcus Garcia; Jose Arana; Fourth official: Victor Borges |

=== Final ===
| November 4 | #1 Liberty | 1–1 (a.e.t.) (3–4 p) | #2 Florida Gulf Coast | Lynchburg, VA |
| 6:00 p.m. | Chloe Marr 37' | Report | (yellow card) 53', (goal) 85' Margaret Berry | Stadium: Osborne Stadium; Attendance: 964; Referee: Amin Hadzic; Assistant referees: Jordan Davis; Otto Leon; Fourth official: Nickrod Fateh |
| | Penalties |
| | Saydie Holland (penalty scored); McKinley Burkett (penalty missed); Rachel DeRuby (penalty scored); Halle Engle (penalty scored); Rebekah Earnest (penalty missed) | | (penalty missed) Leah Scarpelli; (penalty scored) Louise Lillback; (penalty scored) Ashley Labbe; (penalty scored) Erika Zschuppe; (penalty scored) Nellie Nygren |

== Statistics ==
=== Goalscorers ===
There were 18 goals scored in 7 matches, for an average of 2.57 goals per match (as of November 4, 2022).

3 goals

- Chloe Marr – Liberty

2 goals

- Margaret Berry – Florida Gulf Coast
- Saydie Holland – Liberty

1 goal

- Anna Kerr – Central Arkansas
- Taylor Lassiter – Central Arkansas
- Tristyn Pavatt – Central Arkansas
- Gretta Gunn – Eastern Kentucky
- Maddy Lemery – Eastern Kentucky
- Marla Gaudlitz – Florida Gulf Coast
- Leah Scarpelli – Florida Gulf Coast
- Erika Zschuppe – Florida Gulf Coast
- McKinley Burkett – Liberty
- Rachel DeRuby – Liberty
- Kelli Beiler – Lipscomb

== All-Tournament team ==
| Player | Team |
|---|---|
| Taylor Lassiter | Central Arkansas |
| Keyla Perez | Central Arkansas |
| Gretta Gunn | Eastern Kentucky |
| Maddy Lemery | Eastern Kentucky |
| **Katie Sullivan** | Florida Gulf Coast |
| Louise Lillback | Florida Gulf Coast |
| Leah Scarpelli | Florida Gulf Coast |
| Erika Zschuppe | Florida Gulf Coast |
| Saydie Holland | Liberty |
| Bridie Herman | Liberty |
| Chloe Marr | Liberty |

MVP in bold
