= Erika Zschuppe =

American soccer player (born 2003)

Personal information
- Full name: Erika Vrban Zschuppe
- Date of birth: September 10, 2003 (age 23)
- Height: 5 ft 4 in (1.63 m)
- Positions: Midfielder; forward

Team information
- Current team: Tampa Bay Sun
- Number: 13

Youth career
- 2018–2021: Kirtland Hornets
- 2020–2022: Internationals SC

College career
| Years | Team | Apps | (Gls) |
| 2022–2025 | Florida Gulf Coast Eagles | 78 | (46) |

Senior career*
| Years | Team | Apps | (Gls) |
| 2026– | Tampa Bay Sun | 7 | (0) |

International career^{‡}
| 2026– | Croatia | 2 | (0) |
- * Club domestic league appearances and goals as of 00:45, 7 November 2026 (UTC) ‡ National team caps and goals as of 00:53, 13 October 2026 (UTC)

Erika Vrban Zschuppe (born September 10, 2003) is a professional soccer player who plays as a midfielder or forward for USL Super League club Tampa Bay Sun. Born in the United States, she plays for the Croatia national team. She played college soccer for the Florida Gulf Coast Eagles and was named the ASUN Player of the Year after leading the nation in goals per game in 2025.

== Early life ==
Zschuppe grew up in Kirtland, Ohio. She was coached by her father in her early years. She played four seasons for Kirtland High School, setting a program record with 170 career goals and providing 39 career assists. She helped the team reach the OHSAA Division III state title game as a freshman in 2018. After another semifinal appearance, she led Kirtland to their first state championship in her junior year in 2020, scoring a hat trick in the final. She joined ECNL club Internationals SC that year and helped the under-18/19 team finish runner-up at the ECNL national finals in 2021. That performance led to her recruitment to Florida Gulf Coast. She was named United Soccer Coaches high school All-American twice, the Ohio DIII Player of the Year twice, and Ms. Soccer Ohio in 2021.

== College career ==
Zschuppe was an immediate starter for the Florida Gulf Coast Eagles as a freshman in 2022, scoring 3 goals in 20 games and earning third-team All-Atlantic Sun (ASUN) honors. She helped the Eagles win their seventh ASUN tournament, scoring the overtime winner in the semifinals and converting a penalty in the final shootout. She led the team with 10 goals in 22 games as a sophomore in 2023, earning first-team All-ASUN honors. She helped FGCU repeat in the ASUN tournament, scoring a second-half hat trick to erase a 3–0 deficit in the final, and was named tournament MVP. In her junior year in 2024, she again led the team with 12 goals in 19 games and was again named first-team All-ASUN, helping the Eagles win the ASUN regular-season championship.

Previously a striker or winger, Zschuppe moved to attacking midfielder for her senior season in 2025. The move paid off when she scored a program record 21 goals in 17 games, winning the NCAA Division I's statistical scoring championship with 1.27 goals per game. FGCU won their second consecutive ASUN regular-season title but were upset in the ASUN tournament quarterfinals, snapping Zschuppe's ten-game scoring streak. She was named the ASUN Player of the Year and ASUN Midfielder of the Year and named third-team Best XI by TopDrawerSoccer. She finished her college career trailing only Tabby Tindell (66) for the most goals in program history (46).

== Club career ==
Zschuppe attended the NWSL Combine in December 2025. On July 2, 2026, it was officially announced that Zschuppe had joined USL Super League club Tampa Bay Sun, signing her first professional contract.

== International career ==
Zschuppe received her first call-up to the Croatia national team in February 2026, being named to the roster for FIFA Women's World Cup qualifiers against Bulgaria and Kosovo. On June 5, she made her international debut away against Kosovo, playing 33 minutes as a starter in a 1–0 victory.

== Personal life ==
Zschuppe is the daughter of Lucy and Hans Zschuppe Jr. and has a sister. Her father played college soccer for Lakeland Community College, and her grandfather Hans Sr. played professionally in Germany. Zschuppe excelled academically at Florida Gulf Coast University, graduating with a 3.96 grade point average (GPA) and being named the ASUN Women's Soccer Scholar-Athlete of the Year in 2025.

== Honors and awards ==
Florida Gulf Coast Eagles

- Atlantic Sun Conference: 2024, 2025
- ASUN tournament: 2022, 2023

Individual

- NCAA goals per game leader: 2025
- ASUN Player of the Year: 2025
- ASUN Midfielder of the Year: 2025
- First-team All-ASUN: 2023, 2024, 2025
- Third-team All-ASUN: 2022
- ASUN tournament MVP: 2023
- ASUN tournament all-tournament team: 2022, 2023, 2024
