= 2021 ASUN women's soccer tournament =

- Classification: Division I
- Teams: 8
- Matches: 7
- Attendance: 1,573
- Site: Campus Sites, #1 seeds
- Champions: Lipscomb (3rd title)
- Winning coach: Kevin O'Brien (3rd title)
- MVP: Shelby Craft (Lipscomb)
- Broadcast: ESPN+

2021 ASUN Conference women's soccer standings
	Conf.						Overall
Team	W		L		T	PCT	W		L		T	PCT
East
Florida Gulf Coast ‍†‍‍	7	–	2	–	0	.778	10	–	7	–	1	.583
Liberty ‍‍‍	6	–	3	–	0	.667	11	–	7	–	1	.605
Kennesaw State ‍‍‍	4	–	3	–	2	.556	9	–	8	–	2	.526
Jacksonville ‍‍‍	2	–	6	–	1	.278	7	–	8	–	3	.472
North Florida ‍‍‍	4	–	3	–	2	.556	9	–	4	–	3	.656
Stetson ‍‍‍	3	–	5	–	1	.389	6	–	10	–	2	.389
West
Lipscomb ‍†‍‡‍^{y}	7	–	2	–	0	.778	15	–	5	–	1	.738
Central Arkansas ‍‍‍	6	–	3	–	0	.667	9	–	9	–	0	.500
Eastern Kentucky ‍‍‍	4	–	5	–	0	.444	9	–	10	–	0	.474
Bellarmine ‍‍‍	2	–	5	–	2	.333	4	–	7	–	8	.421
Jacksonville State ‍‍‍	3	–	5	–	1	.389	7	–	10	–	2	.421
North Alabama ‍‍‍	1	–	7	–	1	.167	2	–	13	–	3	.194
† – Conference champion ‡ – 2021 ASUN tournament champion y – Invited to the NCAA tournament As of December 7, 2021; Rankings from United Soccer Coaches poll Source:ASUN Conference

The 2021 ASUN women's soccer tournament was the postseason women's soccer tournament for the ASUN Conference held from October 29 through November 6, 2021. All rounds of the tournament were hosted at the Western Division champions and Eastern Division champions home stadiums. The eight-team single-elimination tournament consisted of three rounds based on seeding from regular season conference play. The Liberty Flames were the defending tournament champions, and unable to defend their title, losing to Eastern Kentucky in the Quarterfinals. The Lipscomb Bisons won the tournament after defeating Kennesaw State 1–0 in the final. It was their third title in four years, and third title in program history for Lipscomb and coach Kevin O'Brien. As tournament champions, Lipscomb earned the ASUN's automatic berth into the 2021 NCAA Division I Women's Soccer Tournament.

== Bracket ==
Quarterfinals; Sunday, October 29
1E	Florida Gulf Coast	1 (3)
4W	Bellarmine (pen.)	1 (4)
2W	Central Arkansas	3
3E	Kennesaw State (a.e.t.)	4
1W	Lipscomb	6
5W	Jacksonville State	0
2E	Liberty	0
3W	Eastern Kentucky	1

Semifinals; Friday, October 31
4W	Bellarmine	0
3E	Kennesaw State	1
1W	Lipscomb	4
3W	Eastern Kentucky	0

Final; Sunday, November 6
3E	Kennesaw State	0
1W	Lipscomb	1

== Schedule ==
=== Quarterfinals ===
October 29, 2021	Lipscomb	6–0	Jacksonville State	Nashville, TN
2:00 p.m. CT	Cami Rogers 10', 25'; Kammy McGee 14'; Molly Grant 60'; Noa Ganthier 84'; Shadia Valenzuela 88'	Report		Stadium: Lipscomb Soccer Complex; Attendance: 135; Referee: Kayla Polonksy; Assistant referees: Jarred Mosher; Tarik Veleder; Fourth official: Shane Butler

October 29, 2021	Central Arkansas	3–4 (a.e.t.)	Kennesaw State	Fort Myers, FL
4:00 p.m. ET	Emma Hawkins 59', 62'; Abby Gibson 67'; Alyssa Fason (yellow card) 80'	Report	45', 58', 81' Macie Rainwater; (yellow card) 72' Ebony Clarke; (yellow card) 81' Aila Swinton; 93' Tianna Rivera	Stadium: FGCU Soccer Complex; Attendance: 103; Referee: Richonne Clark; Assistant referees: Edson Carvajal; Ivan Cid Cruz; Fourth official: John Ocampo

October 29, 2021	Liberty	0–1	Eastern Kentucky	Nashville, TN
6:00 p.m. CT		Report	87' Maddy Lemery	Stadium: Lipscomb Soccer Complex; Attendance: 115; Referee: Shane Butler; Assistant referees: Carmelo LoFaro; Justin Higgins; Fourth official: Kayla Polonsky

October 29, 2021	Florida Gulf Coast	1–1 (a.e.t.) (3–4 p)	Bellarmine	Fort Myers, FL
7:00 p.m. ET	Malaya Melancon 31'	Report	89' Lauren Mackey	Stadium: FGCU Soccer Complex; Attendance: 291; Referee: Andres Pfefferkorn; Assistant referees: John Ocampo; Sergio Cabrera; Fourth official: Richonne Clark
	Penalties
	Alyssa Abbondandolo (penalty missed); Olivia Lindstedt (penalty scored); Leah Scarpelli (penalty scored); Louise Lillback (penalty scored); Ashlee Brentlinger (penalty missed)		(penalty scored) Elise Markley; (penalty scored) Sarah Buse; (penalty scored) Sophie Bish; (penalty scored) Lauren Mackey

=== Semifinals ===
October 31, 2021	Kennesaw State	1–0	Bellarmine	Fort Myers, FL
1:00 p.m. ET	Macie Rainwater 74'	Report		Stadium: FGCU Soccer Complex; Attendance: 56; Referee: Jaime Herrera; Assistant referees: Irvin Castilla-Ouijana; Raidel Toledo Andino; Fourth official: Amiel Aleman

October 31, 2021	Lipscomb	4–0	Eastern Kentucky	Nashville, TN
1:00 p.m. CT	Molly Grant 51', 89'; Logan McFadden 67'; Emanuela Schurch 75'	Report	(yellow card) 69' Maddy Lemery	Stadium: Lipscomb Soccer Complex; Attendance: 250; Referee: Kyle Johnston; Assistant referees: Esteban Eordogh; Gerson Castellanos; Fourth official: Matthew Drew

=== Final ===
November 6, 2021	Lipscomb	1–0	Kennesaw State	Nashville, TN
6:00 p.m. CT	Kammy McGee 22'; Emanuela Schurch (yellow card) 25'	Report	(yellow card) 34' Team; (yellow card) 34' Kendall Higgs	Stadium: Lipscomb Soccer Complex; Attendance: 623; Referee: Esteban Rosano; Assistant referees: Christopher Kloc; Esteban Eordogh; Fourth official: Kiah Haslett

== Statistics ==
=== Goalscorers ===
There were 22 goals scored in 7 matches, for an average of 3.14 goals per match (as of November 6, 2021).

4 goals

- Macie Rainwater – Kennesaw State

3 goals

- Molly Grant – Lipscomb

2 goals

- Emma Hawkins – Central Arkansas
- Kammy McGee – Lipscomb
- Cami Rogers – Lipscomb

1 goal

- Lauren Mackey – Bellarmine
- Abby Gibson – Central Arkansas
- Maddy Lemery – Eastern Kentucky
- Malaya Melancon – Florida Gulf Coast
- Tianna Rivera – Kennesaw State
- Noa Ganthier – Lipscomb
- Logan McFadden – Lipscomb
- Emanuela Schurch – Lipscomb
- Shadia Valenzuela – Lipscomb

== All-Tournament team ==
Player	Team
**Shelby Craft**	Lipscomb
CJ Graham	Lipscomb
Logan McFadden	Lipscomb
Kammy McGee	Lipscomb
Aila Swinton	Kennesaw State
Dylan Pixton	Kennesaw State
Macie Rainwater	Kennesaw State
Elyssa Francis	Bellarmine
Sarah Kraus	Bellarmine
Nerea de Diego	Eastern Kentucky
Lucy Ream	Eastern Kentucky

MVP in bold
