= 2025 ASUN women's soccer tournament =

American college soccer tournament

- Classification: Division I
- Teams: 8
- Matches: 7
- Attendance: 907
- Quarterfinals site: FGCU Soccer Complex, Fort Myers; Lipscomb Soccer Complex, Nashville
- Semifinals site: FGCU Soccer Complex; Lipscomb Soccer Complex
- Finals site: Lipscomb Soccer Complex
- Champions: Lipscomb (5th title)
- Winning coach: Kevin O'Brien (5th title)
- MVP: Bella Carapazza (Lipscomb)
- Broadcast: ESPN+

2025 ASUN Conference women's soccer standings
	Conf.						Overall
Team	W		L		T	PCT	W		L		T	PCT
Gold
Lipscomb ‍†‍‡‍^{y}	7	–	2	–	1	.750	15	–	6	–	2	.696
Eastern Kentucky ‍‍‍	5	–	2	–	3	.650	10	–	4	–	5	.658
North Alabama ‍‍‍	4	–	3	–	3	.550	8	–	5	–	6	.579
Bellarmine ‍‍‍	4	–	5	–	1	.450	11	–	6	–	3	.625
Central Arkansas ‍‍‍	3	–	5	–	2	.400	6	–	9	–	2	.412
Austin Peay ‍‍‍	0	–	6	–	4	.200	0	–	11	–	7	.194
Graphite
Florida Gulf Coast ‍†‍‍	8	–	1	–	1	.850	11	–	5	–	2	.667
Jacksonville ‍‍‍	6	–	1	–	3	.750	9	–	5	–	5	.605
North Florida ‍‍‍	5	–	3	–	2	.600	9	–	9	–	4	.500
Queens ‍‍‍	2	–	6	–	2	.300	3	–	11	–	5	.289
West Georgia ^{#} ‍‍‍	2	–	6	–	2	.300	4	–	13	–	2	.263
Stetson ‍‍‍	2	–	8	–	0	.200	5	–	14	–	0	.263
† – Conference champion ‡ – 2025 ASUN Tournament champion y – Invited to the NCAA Tournament^{#} – Ineligible for post-season (In transition); As of December 9, 2025; Rankings from United Soccer Coaches Poll; Source:Atlantic Sun Conference

The 2025 ASUN women's soccer tournament was the postseason women's soccer tournament for the ASUN Conference that was held from October 30 to November 9, 2025. The seven-match tournament had the quarterfinals and semifinals hosted by the #1 seeds of the Gold and Graphite Divisions, while the final was hosted by the highest remaining seed. The eight-team single-elimination tournament consisted of three rounds based on seeding from regular season conference play. The defending champions were Lipscomb, who won their fourth title in the previous season. Lipscomb successfully defended their title by defeating North Florida 3–0 in the final, winning their fifth overall title.

As tournament champions, Lipscomb earned the ASUN's automatic berth into the 2025 NCAA Division I women's soccer tournament.

== Seeding ==
The top four teams of the Gold and Graphite Divisions in the regular season earned a spot in the tournament. Teams were seeded based on their regular season conference records.

=== Gold Division ===
No tiebreakers were required for the Gold Division, as each team finished with a unique regular season record.

Seed	School	Conference Record	Points
1	Lipscomb	7–2–1	22
2	Eastern Kentucky	5–2–3	18
3	North Alabama	4–3–3	15
4	Bellarmine	4–5–1	13

=== Graphite Division ===
A tiebreaker was required in the Graphite Division to determine whether Queens or West Georgia would take the fourth seed, as both teams finished the regular season with a 2–6–2 record. Queens secured the final seed thanks to their 3–0 victory over West Georgia on October 5, 2025.

Seed	School	Conference Record	Points
1	Florida Gulf Coast	8–1–1	25
2	Jacksonville	6–1–3	21
3	North Florida	5–3–2	17
4	Queens	2–6–2	8

== Bracket ==
Quarterfinals; Thursday, Oct. 30
GO1	Lipscomb	2
GR4	Queens	0
GR2	Jacksonville (pen.)	0 (4)
GO3	North Alabama	0 (3)
GR1	Florida Gulf Coast	1
GO4	Bellarmine	3
GO2	Eastern Kentucky	0
GR3	North Florida	1

Semifinals; Sunday, Nov. 2
GO1	Lipscomb	1
GR2	Jacksonville	0
GO4	Bellarmine	0
GR3	North Florida	2

Final; Sunday, Nov. 9
GO1	Lipscomb	3
GR3	North Florida	0

== Schedule ==
=== Quarterfinals ===
October 30, 2025	GO#1 Lipscomb	2–0	GR#4 Queens	Nashville, TN
13:00 CST	Skylar Cole 50'; Bella Carapazza 76'	Report		Stadium: Lipscomb Soccer Complex; Attendance: 95; Referee: Celeste Roberts

October 30, 2025	GO#2 Eastern Kentucky	0–1	GR#3 North Florida	Fort Myers, FL
15:00 EST	Ana Manning (yellow card) 83'	Report	Emery Scerbo (yellow card) 59'; Allie Fekany 85'	Stadium: FGCU Soccer Complex; Attendance: 110; Referee: Andres Pfefferkorn

October 30, 2025	GR#2 Jacksonville	0–0 (a.e.t.) (4–3 p)	GO#3 North Alabama	Nashville, TN
18:00 CST	Frida Johansson (yellow card) 57'	Report	Lilly Ford (yellow card) 87'; Alice Bussey (yellow card) 90'	Stadium: Lipscomb Soccer Complex; Attendance: 132; Referee: Dorian Del Toro Urueta
	Penalties
	Alicia Rey Perez (penalty scored); Laura Di Mascio (penalty scored); Paula Herranz (penalty scored); Claudia Perez Avila (penalty scored); Olivia Peal (penalty missed)		(penalty scored) Alice Bussey; (penalty missed) Gizelle El Assal; (penalty scored) Charlotte Sobotka; (penalty scored) Adelyn Speight; (penalty missed) Lilly Ford

October 30, 2025	GR#1 Florida Gulf Coast	1–3	GO#4 Bellarmine	Fort Myers, FL
19:00 EST	Lauren Dwyer (yellow card) 84'; Kendal Gargiula 86'	Report	Brynn Severance 14'; Lucy von Stefenelli 30'; McKenzie Carle 64'	Stadium: FGCU Soccer Complex; Attendance: 208; Referee: Famel Restrepo

=== Semifinals ===
November 2, 2025	GR#3 North Florida	2–0	GO#4 Bellarmine	Fort Myers, FL
13:00 EST	Chloe Lynch 5'; Marisa Ocasek (yellow card) 74'; Paige McSwigan 82'; Allison Souers (yellow card) 84'	Report	Abigail Fike (yellow card) 79'	Stadium: FGCU Soccer Complex; Attendance: 75; Referee: John Tamayo

November 2, 2025	GR#2 Jacksonville	0–1 (a.e.t.)	GO#1 Lipscomb	Nashville, TN
13:00 CST	Millie Urquhart (yellow card) 68'; Alicia Rey Perez (yellow card) 77'; Laura Di Mascio (yellow card) 82'; Samantha Sharrocks (yellow card) 84'; Lina Ballmann (yellow card) 91'	Report	London De Fini (yellow card) 56'; Bella Carapazza (yellow card) 69'; Hailey Johnson (yellow card) 70'; Maddy Rhodes 92'	Stadium: Lipscomb Soccer Complex; Attendance: 134; Referee: Rhiannon Daugs

=== Final ===
November 9, 2025	GO#1 Lipscomb	3–0	GR#3 North Florida	Nashville, TN
13:00 CST	Maddy Rhodes 21'; Lucy Hurst 41'; Chloe Iliff (yellow card) 53'; Hailey Johnson 79'	Report	Allie Fekany (yellow card) 63'	Stadium: Lipscomb Soccer Complex; Attendance: 153; Referee: Dorian Del Toro Urueta

== Statistics ==
=== Goalscorers ===
There were 13 goals scored in 7 matches, for an average of 1.86 goals per match (as of November 9, 2025).

2 goals

- Maddy Rhodes – Lipscomb

1 goal

- Bella Carapazza – Lipscomb
- McKenzie Carle – Bellarmine
- Skylar Cole – Lipscomb
- Allie Fekany – North Florida
- Kendal Gargiula – Florida Gulf Coast
- Lucy Hurst – Lipscomb
- Hailey Johnson – Lipscomb
- Chloe Lynch – North Florida
- Paige McSwigan – North Florida
- Brynn Severance – Bellarmine
- Lucy von Stefenelli – Bellarmine
