= 2023 ASUN women's soccer tournament =

American college soccer tournament

- Classification: Division I
- Teams: 8
- Matches: 7
- Attendance: 1,905
- Site: Campus Sites, higher seed
- Champions: Florida Gulf Coast (8th title)
- Winning coach: Jim Blankenship (8th title)
- MVP: Erika Zschuppe (Florida Gulf Coast)
- Broadcast: ESPN+

2023 ASUN Conference women's soccer standings
	Conf.						Overall
Team	W		L		T	PCT	W		L		T	PCT
Lipscomb ‍†‍‍	10	–	0	–	1	.955	14	–	5	–	1	.725
Central Arkansas ‍‍‍	7	–	1	–	3	.773	8	–	7	–	5	.525
Florida Gulf Coast ‍‍‡‍^{y}	7	–	1	–	3	.773	12	–	5	–	5	.659
North Alabama ‍‍‍	5	–	3	–	3	.591	11	–	5	–	6	.636
Eastern Kentucky ‍‍‍	4	–	3	–	4	.545	5	–	8	–	6	.421
Queens ‍‍‍	2	–	3	–	6	.455	4	–	7	–	8	.421
Austin Peay ‍‍‍	3	–	5	–	3	.409	5	–	11	–	5	.357
Kennesaw State ‍‍‍	3	–	5	–	3	.409	4	–	8	–	7	.395
Stetson ‍‍‍	3	–	6	–	2	.364	3	–	12	–	3	.250
North Florida ‍‍‍	2	–	6	–	3	.318	4	–	9	–	5	.361
Bellarmine ‍‍‍	1	–	7	–	3	.227	4	–	9	–	5	.361
Jacksonville ‍‍‍	1	–	8	–	2	.182	3	–	11	–	4	.278
† – Conference champion ‡ – 2023 ASUN Tournament champion y – Invited to the NCAA Tournament; As of December 5, 2023; Rankings from United Soccer Coaches Poll; Source: Atlantic Sun Conference

The 2023 ASUN women's soccer tournament was the postseason women's soccer tournament for the ASUN Conference held from October 26 through November 5, 2023. The tournament was hosted at campus sites, with the #3 and #6 seed hosting the First Round and Quarterfinals while the #1 seed hosted the Semifinals and Final. The eight-team single-elimination tournament consisted of four rounds based on seeding from regular season conference play. The Florida Gulf Coast Eagles were the defending tournament champions. The Eagles successfully defended their tile, defeating North Alabama in a penalty-shoot out in the Final. It was Florida Gulf Coast's eighth overall title. All of the Eagle's titles have come under coach Jim Blankenship. As tournament champions, Florida Gulf Coast earned the ASUN's automatic berth into the 2023 NCAA Division I women's soccer tournament.

== Seeding ==
The top eight teams in the regular season earned a spot in the tournament. The top seed earned the right to host the Final and Semifinals. The #3 seed and #4 seed hosted a First Round game and a Quarterfinal each. A tiebreaker was required to determine the second and third seeds for the tournament as Central Arkansas and Florida Gulf Coast both finished with a 7–1–3 record and 24 conference points. Central Arkansas was awarded the second seed by virtue of their 2–1 regular season victory over Florida Gulf Coast on September 21. There was a three-way tie for the sixth, seventh, and eight seeds between Kennesaw State, Austin Peay and Queens as all teams finished with 12 conference points. Kennesaw State earned the sixth seed by defeating Queens and drawing with Austin Peay during the regular season. Austin Peay was the seventh seed after drawing with both Queens and Kennesaw State. Queens was the eighth and final seed after losing to Kennessaw State and drawing with Austin Peay during the regular season.

Seed	School	Conference Record	Points
1	Lipscomb	10–0–1	31
2	Central Arkansas	7–1–3	24
3	Florida Gulf Coast	7–1–3	24
4	North Alabama	5–3–3	18
5	Eastern Kentucky	4–3–4	16
6	Kennesaw State	3–5–3	12
7	Austin Peay	3–5–3	12
8	Queens	2–3–6	12

== Bracket ==
First Round; Thursday, October 26
5	Eastern Kentucky	0 (2)
8	Queens (pen.)	0 (4)
6	Kennesaw State (pen.)	1 (3)
7	Austin Peay	1 (2)

Quarterfinals; Sunday, October 29
4	North Alabama	1
8	Queens	0
3	Florida Gulf Coast	3
6	Kennesaw State	2

Semifinals; Thursday, November 2
1	Lipscomb	0
4	North Alabama	1
2	Central Arkansas	0
3	Florida Gulf Coast	2

Final; Sunday, November 5
4	North Alabama	3 (2)
3	Florida Gulf Coast (pen.)	3 (3)

== Schedule ==
=== First Round ===
October 26	#6 Kennesaw State	1–1 (a.e.t.) (2–3 p)	#7 Austin Peay	Fort Myers, FL
5:00 p.m.	Tianna Rivera 79'	Report	80' Ellie Dreas	Stadium: FGCU Soccer Complex; Attendance: 77
	Penalties
	Maddy Baucom (penalty missed); Tianna Rivera (penalty scored); Aila Swinton (penalty missed); Stella Allen (penalty scored); Jade Barkett (penalty missed); Mackenzie Anuska (penalty missed)		(penalty missed) Alec Baumgardt; (penalty scored) Katie Bahn; (penalty scored) Hannah Zahn; (penalty missed) Tori Case; (penalty missed) Maddy Bellisari; (penalty scored) Alexis Shuster

October 26	#5 Eastern Kentucky	0–0 (a.e.t.) (2–4 p)	#8 Queens	Florence, AL
7:00 p.m.		Report	(red card) 11' Laney Newnam	Stadium: Bill Jones Athletic Complex; Attendance: 187; Referee: Christopher Heintzman; Assistant referees: Sarah Gaddes; Ethan Wilson; Fourth official: Nicole Steiner
	Penalties
	Carly Dean (penalty scored); Gretta Gunn (penalty missed); Kylie Fitzgerald (penalty missed); Kaia Griffin (penalty scored)		(penalty scored) Hilda Svensson; (penalty scored) Amy Hare; (penalty scored) Maddy Leone; (penalty scored) Lucie Platt

=== Quarterfinals ===
October 29	#3 Florida Gulf Coast	3–2	#7 Austin Peay	Fort Myers, FL
1:00 p.m.	Maya Henley Buisan 66'; Erika Zschuppe 71' (pen.); Ashley Labbe 72'	Report	15' Alec Baumgardt; 82' Alana Owens	Stadium: FGCU Soccer Complex; Attendance: 260

October 29	#4 North Alabama	1–0	#8 Queens	Florence, AL
1:00 p.m.	Kellie Hovis 72'	Report		Stadium: Bill Jones Athletic Complex; Attendance: 655; Referee: Melenda Sopka; Assistant referees: Dorian Del Toro Urueta; Lucy Bell; Fourth official: Celeste Roberts

=== Semifinals ===
November 2	#1 Lipscomb	0–1	#4 North Alabama	Nashville, TN
2:00 p.m.		Report	(yellow card) 19' Briana Eads; 69' Adelyn Speight; (yellow card) 74' Hope Lensing; (yellow card) 74' Goose Andrews; (yellow card) 79' Alice Bussey	Stadium: Lipscomb Soccer Complex; Attendance: 313; Referee: Leland Grace; Assistant referees: Rachel Casey; Amir Torkamani; Fourth official: Don Eubank

November 2	#2 Central Arkansas	0–2	#3 Florida Gulf Coast	Nashville, TN
6:00 p.m.		Report	23' Kendal Gargiula; 76' Ashley Labbe	Stadium: Lipscomb Soccer Complex; Attendance: 107; Referee: Benjamin Meyer; Assistant referees: Isaac Martinez; Lauren Gray; Fourth official: Matt Drew

=== Final ===
November 5	#3 Florida Gulf Coast	3–3 (a.e.t.) (3–2 p)	#4 North Alabama	Nashville, TN
1:00 p.m.	Erika Zschuppe 65', 67', 79'; Grace Paradis (yellow card) 83'	Report	30' Izzi Gurney-Harper; 31' Juila Murdoch; 40' Kellie Hovis; (yellow card) 109' Montana Merkle	Stadium: Lipscomb Soccer Complex; Attendance: 306; Referee: Lila Remache; Assistant referees: Sarah Gaddes; Maggie Burkett; Fourth official: Ariel Mays
	Penalties
	Erika Zschuppe (penalty scored); Ashley Labbe (penalty scored); Courtney Corcoran (penalty missed); Katelyn Kauffman (penalty scored)		(penalty missed) Alice Bussey; (penalty scored) Goose Andrews; (penalty missed) Hannah Guthrie; (penalty scored) Briana Eads; (penalty missed) Izzi Gurney-Harper

== Statistics ==
=== Goalscorers ===
There were 17 goals scored in 7 matches, for an average of 2.43 goals per match (as of November 5, 2022).

4 goals

- Erika Zschuppe – Florida Gulf Coast

2 goals

- Ashley Labbe – Florida Gulf Coast
- Kellie Hovis – North Alabama

1 goal

- Alec Baumgardt – Austin Peay
- Ellie Dreas – Austin Peay
- Alana Owens – Austin Peay
- Maya Henley Buisan – Florida Gulf Coast
- Kendal Gargiula – Florida Gulf Coast
- Tianna Rivera – Kennesaw State
- Izzi Gurney-Harper – North Alabama
- Juila Murdoch – North Alabama
- Adelyn Speight – North Alabama

== All-Tournament team ==
Player	Team
**Erika Zschuppe**	Florida Gulf Coast
Kendal Gargiula	Florida Gulf Coast
Ashley Labbe	Florida Gulf Coast
Olivia Molina	Florida Gulf Coast
Briana Eads	North Alabama
Molly Parham	North Alabama
Adriana Wright	North Alabama
Kelli Beiler	Lipscomb
Shelby Craft	Lipscomb
Sydney Brough	Central Arkansas
Emily Wissel-Littmann	Central Arkansas

MVP in bold
