= 2019 ASUN women's soccer tournament =

2019 Women's soccer tournament

- Classification: Division I
- Teams: 6
- Matches: 5
- Attendance: 1,221
- Site: Campus Sites, higher seed
- Champions: Lipscomb (2nd title)
- Winning coach: Kevin O'Brien (2nd title)
- MVP: Melissa Gray (Lipscomb)
- Broadcast: ESPN+

2019 Atlantic Sun Conference women's soccer standings
| | Conf. | | | | | | Overall |
| Team | W | | L | | T | PCT | W | | L | | T | PCT |
|---|---|---|---|---|---|---|---|---|---|---|---|---|
| Florida Gulf Coast ‍†‍‍ | 6 | – | 1 | – | 1 | .813 | 11 | – | 4 | – | 2 | .706 |
| Lipscomb ‍†‍‡‍^{y} | 6 | – | 1 | – | 1 | .813 | 13 | – | 6 | – | 2 | .667 |
| Liberty ‍‍‍ | 6 | – | 2 | – | 0 | .750 | 10 | – | 7 | – | 2 | .579 |
| North Florida ‍‍‍ | 5 | – | 2 | – | 1 | .688 | 11 | – | 6 | – | 2 | .632 |
| Kennesaw St. ‍‍‍ | 5 | – | 3 | – | 0 | .625 | 11 | – | 7 | – | 2 | .600 |
| NJIT ‍‍‍ | 3 | – | 4 | – | 1 | .438 | 7 | – | 8 | – | 3 | .472 |
| North Alabama ‍‍‍ | 2 | – | 6 | – | 0 | .250 | 6 | – | 11 | – | 0 | .353 |
| Stetson ‍‍‍ | 0 | – | 7 | – | 1 | .063 | 2 | – | 13 | – | 2 | .176 |
| Jacksonville ‍‍‍ | 0 | – | 7 | – | 1 | .063 | 0 | – | 13 | – | 3 | .094 |
† – Conference champion ‡ – 2019 ASUN Tournament champion y – Invited to the NCAA tournament As of December 9, 2019; Rankings from United Soccer Coaches Poll; Source:Atlantic Sun Conference

The 2019 ASUN women's soccer tournament was the postseason women's soccer tournament for the ASUN Conference held from November 1 through November 9, 2019. The first round of the tournament was hosted at the first and second seed's home stadium. Then the remaining rounds of the tournament were hosted by the higher seed. The six-team single-elimination tournament consisted of three rounds based on seeding from regular season conference play. The Lipscomb Bison were the defending tournament champions, and successfully defended their crown, defeating Florida Gulf Coast in the final. It was the second consecutive title, and second title in program history for Lipscomb and coach Kevin O'Brien.

== Bracket ==
First round November 1
4 | North Florida | 1
5 | Kennesaw St. | 3
3 | Liberty | 1
6 | NJIT | 2

Semifinals; November 3
1 | FL Gulf Coast | 2 (1)
5 | Kennesaw St. | 2 (2)
2 | Lipscomb | 1
6 | NJIT | 0

Final; November 9
5 | Kennesaw St. | 1 (3)
2 | Lipscomb | 1 (4)

== Schedule ==
=== First Round ===
| November 1, 2019 | #4 North Florida | 1–3 | #5 Kennesaw St. | Fort Myers, FL |
| 5:00 p.m. EST | Thais Reiss 74' | Report | 7' Erin Harris; (yellow card) 20', (goal) 82' Isabella Contreras; 25' Morgan Harrison | Stadium: FGCU Soccer Complex; Referee: Esteban Rosano; Assistant referees: Lyubomir Sapundzhiev; Hayden Oscanoa; Fourth official: Jorge Taborda |

| November 1, 2019 | #3 Liberty | 1–2 | #6 NJIT | Nashville, TN |
| 6:00 p.m. CT | Avery Belk 71' | Report | 78' Lauren Chamberlain; 80' Fiona Wright | Stadium: Lipscomb Soccer Complex; Attendance: 350 |

=== Semifinals ===
| November 3, 2019 | #1 FL Gulf Coast | 2–2 (a.e.t.) (1–2 p) | #5 Kennesaw St. | Fort Myers, FL |
| 1:00 p.m. EST | Kara Kyramarios 9'; Cassidy Morgan (yellow card) 26'; Evdokia Popadinova 43'; Syniah Clark (yellow card) 47' | Report | (yellow card) 9' (goal) 58' Carly Pressgrove; (yellow card) 48' Team; 52', (yellow card) 98' Becky Contreras; (yellow card) 82' Sydney Sauer; (yellow card) 109' Erin Harris | Stadium: FGCU Soccer Complex; Attendance: 271; Referee: Jonathan Weiner; Assistant referees: Matthew Schwartz; Cyril Madukanya; Fourth official: Amiel Aleman |
| | Penalties |
| | Evdokia Popadinova (penalty missed); Lindsey Patton (penalty missed); Alyssa Abbondandolo (penalty scored); Kara Kyramarios (penalty missed); Marjorie Boilesen (penalty missed) | | (penalty missed) Jenna Vollrath; (penalty scored) Isabella Contreras; (penalty scored) Becky Contreras; (penalty missed) Kendall Hart |

| November 3, 2019 | #2 Lipscomb | 1–0 | #6 NJIT | Nashville, TN |
| 1:00 p.m. CT | Danielle Van Liere 86' | Report | | Stadium: Lipscomb Soccer Complex; Attendance: 200 |

=== Final ===
| November 9, 2019 | #2 Lipscomb | 1–1 (a.e.t.) (4–3 p) | #5 Kennesaw St. | Nashville, TN |
| 7:00 p.m. CT | Olivia Doak 14'; Emily Patti (yellow card) 102' | Report | 68' Erin Harris; (yellow card) 93' Kendall Hart | Stadium: Lipscomb Soccer Complex; Attendance: 400 |
| | Penalties |
| | Leah Cernicky (penalty missed); Maycie McKay (penalty missed); Macy Douglas (penalty scored); Hailey Eck (penalty scored); Audrey Ann Beck (penalty scored); Emily Patti (penalty scored) | | (penalty scored) Sydney Crowley; (penalty scored) Carly Pressgrove; (penalty scored) Emely Sosa; (penalty missed) Becky Contreras; (penalty missed) Isabella Contreras; (penalty missed) Sydney Sauer |

== Statistics ==
=== Goalscorers ===
2 Goals

- Erin Harris (Kennesaw State)

1 Goal

- Avery Belk (Liberty)
- Lauren Chamberlain (NJIT)
- Becky Contreras (Kennesaw State)
- Isabella Contreras (Kennesaw State)
- Olivia Doak (Lipscomb)
- Morgan Harrison (Kennesaw State)
- Kara Kyramarios (Florida Gulf Coast)
- Evdokia Popadinova (Florida Gulf Coast)
- Carly Pressgrove (Kennesaw State)
- Thais Reiss (North Florida)
- Danielle Van Liere (Lipscomb)

== All-Tournament team ==
| Player | Team |
|---|---|
| **Melissa Gray** | Lipscomb |
| Olivia Doak | Lipscomb |
| Dominique Diller | Lipscomb |
| Hailey Eck | Lipscomb |
| Lindsey Patton | Florida Gulf Coast |
| Evdokia Popadinova | Florida Gulf Coast |
| Molly Saylor | NJIT |
| Nicole Loehle | NJIT |
| Becky Contreras | Kennesaw State |
| Carly Pressgrove | Kennesaw State |
| Tiffany Sornpao | Kennesaw State |

MVP in bold
