= 2024 ASUN women's soccer tournament =

American college soccer tournament

- Classification: Division I
- Teams: 8
- Matches: 7
- Attendance: 1,628
- First round site: Lipscomb Soccer Complex; Hodges Stadium; Nashville, Tennessee; Jacksonville, Florida
- Quarterfinals site: Lipscomb Soccer Complex; Hodges Stadium; Nashville, Tennessee; Jacksonville, Florida
- Semifinals site: FGCU Soccer Complex; Fort Myers, Florida
- Finals site: FGCU Soccer Complex; Fort Myers, Florida
- Champions: Lipscomb (4th title)
- Winning coach: Kevin O'Brien (4th title)
- MVP: Kiara Pralle (Lipscomb)
- Broadcast: ESPN+

2024 ASUN Conference women's soccer standings
	Conf.						Overall
Team	W		L		T	PCT	W		L		T	PCT
Florida Gulf Coast ‍†‍‍	9	–	1	–	1	.864	11	–	6	–	2	.632
Central Arkansas ‍‍‍	8	–	1	–	2	.818	9	–	7	–	2	.556
Lipscomb ‍‍‡‍^{y}	7	–	1	–	3	.773	14	–	4	–	4	.727
Eastern Kentucky ‍‍‍	7	–	3	–	1	.682	12	–	8	–	3	.587
North Florida ‍‍‍	6	–	1	–	4	.727	9	–	4	–	7	.625
Austin Peay ‍‍‍	5	–	3	–	3	.591	7	–	6	–	6	.526
Bellarmine ‍‍‍	4	–	6	–	1	.409	5	–	12	–	3	.325
Jacksonville ‍‍‍	3	–	6	–	2	.364	4	–	10	–	4	.333
Stetson ‍‍‍	3	–	8	–	0	.273	8	–	11	–	0	.421
Queens ‍‍‍	1	–	6	–	4	.273	5	–	10	–	4	.368
West Georgia ‍‍‍	1	–	9	–	1	.136	2	–	14	–	1	.147
North Alabama ‍‍‍	1	–	10	–	0	.091	3	–	14	–	0	.176
† – Conference champion ‡ – 2024 ASUN Tournament champion y – Invited to the NCAA Tournament; As of December 10, 2024; Rankings from United Soccer Coaches Poll; Source:Atlantic Sun Conference

The 2024 ASUN women's soccer tournament was the postseason women's soccer tournament for the ASUN Conference held from October 31 through November 10, 2024. The tournament was hosted at campus sites, with the #3 and #6 seed hosting the First Round and Quarterfinals while the #1 seed hosted the Semifinals and Final. The eight-team single-elimination tournament consisted of four rounds based on seeding from regular season conference play. The Florida Gulf Coast Eagles were the defending tournament champions. The Eagles were unable to defend their title, falling to Eastern Kentucky in the Semifinals. Eastern Kentucky went on to lose the final to Lipscomb 1–0. It was Lipscomb's fourth overall title. All of the Bison's titles have come under head coach Kevin O'Brien. As tournament champions, Lipscomb earned the ASUN's automatic berth into the 2024 NCAA Division I women's soccer tournament.

== Seeding ==
The top eight teams in the regular season earned a spot in the tournament. The top seed earned the right to host the Final and Semifinals. The #3 seed and #4 seed hosted a First Round game and a Quarterfinal each. Teams were seeded based on regular season conference records. A tiebreaker was required to determine the fourth and fifth seeds as Eastern Kentucky and North Florida both tied with twenty-two regular season conference points. North Florida earned the fourth seed, and the right to host, by virtue of their 2–1 win over Eastern Kentucky on October 20.

Seed	School	Conference Record	Points
1	Florida Gulf Coast	9–1–1	28
2	Central Arkansas	8–1–2	26
3	Lipscomb	7–1–3	24
4	North Florida	6–1–4	22
5	Eastern Kentucky	7–3–1	22
6	Austin Peay	5–3–3	18
7	Bellarmine	4–6–1	13
8	Jacksonville	3–6–2	11

== Bracket ==
First Round; Thursday, October 31
5	Eastern Kentucky (pen.)	1 (5)
8	Jacksonville	1 (4)
6	Austin Peay	1 (3)
7	Bellarmine (pen.)	1 (4)

Quarterfinals; Sunday, November 3
4	North Florida	0
5	Eastern Kentucky	1
3	Lipscomb (a.e.t.)	2
7	Bellarmine	1

Semifinals; Thursday, November 7
1	Florida Gulf Coast	1
5	Eastern Kentucky (a.e.t.)	2
2	Central Arkansas	0
3	Lipscomb	7

Final; Sunday, November 10
5	Eastern Kentucky	0
3	Lipscomb	1

== Schedule ==
=== First Round ===
October 31, 2024	#6 Austin Peay	1–1 (a.e.t.) (3–4 p)	#7 Bellarmine	Nashville, TN
2:00 p.m. CST	Ellie Dreas 50'; Kylie Wells (yellow card) 68'	Report	83' (pen.) Lucy von Stefenelli	Stadium: Lipscomb Soccer Complex; Attendance: 127; Referee: Christopher Heintzman; Assistant referees: Rebecca Luther; Matt Drew
	Penalties
	Hannah Zahn (penalty scored); Haley Lindquist (penalty scored); Katie Bahn (penalty missed); Vivian Burke (penalty scored); Kiley Reese (penalty missed)		(penalty scored) Alexa Orozco; (penalty scored) Campbell Tippey; (penalty scored) Lauren Bingham; (penalty scored) McKenzie Price

October 31, 2024	#5 Eastern Kentucky	1–1 (a.e.t.) (5–4 p)	#8 Jacksonville	Jacksonville, FL
7:00 p.m. EST	Rachel Robinson 87'	Report	33' Laura Di Mascio; (yellow card) 109' Madelyn Radtke	Stadium: Hodges Stadium; Attendance: 227
	Penalties
	Chiara Premoli (penalty scored); Kaitlyn Rowlett (penalty scored); Sydney Taylor (penalty scored); Paula Herranz (penalty scored); Kylie Fitzgerald (penalty scored)		(penalty scored) Laura Di Mascio; (penalty scored) Andrea Zwinkles; (penalty scored) Ines Martin; (penalty missed) Makala Woodford; (penalty scored) Georgina Spraggon

=== Quarterfinals ===
November 3, 2024	#3 Lipscomb	2–1 (a.e.t.)	#7 Bellarmine	Nashville, TN
1:00 p.m. CST	Paige Archbold 74'; Alivia Carapazza (yellow card) 78'; Lucy Hurst (yellow card) 92'; Hailey Johnson 107'	Report	9' Emma Nicholson; (yellow card) 61' Emily Passini; (yellow card) 80' Alexa Orozco; (yellow card) 96' Sidney Rigsby	Stadium: Lipscomb Soccer Complex; Attendance: 217; Referee: Christopher Heintzman; Assistant referees: Rebecca Luther; Matt Drew

November 3, 2024	#4 North Florida	0–1	#5 Eastern Kentucky	Jacksonville, FL
6:00 p.m. EST		Report	23' Gretta Gunn	Stadium: Hodges Stadium; Attendance: 349; Referee: Elvis Osmanovic; Assistant referees: Matthew Osterhouse; Bartosz Cieslak; Fourth official: Kenan Mehmedic

=== Semifinals ===
November 7, 2024	#2 Central Arkansas	0–7	#3 Lipscomb	Fort Myers, FL
3:00 p.m. EST	Team (yellow card) 52'	Report	7', 54', 65' Kiara Pralle; 10' Hailey Johnson; 27' Tatum Ahlemeyer; 43', 70' Taylor James	Stadium: FGCU Soccer Complex; Attendance: 96; Referee: Elvis Osmanovic; Assistant referees: Kevin Klinger; Jorge Pedemonte; Fourth official: John Tamayo

November 7, 2024	#1 Florida Gulf Coast	1–2 (a.e.t.)	#5 Eastern Kentucky	Fort Myers, FL
7:00 p.m. EST	Erika Zschuppe 35'; Lauren Dwyer (yellow card) 42'	Report	53' Ella Grode; (yellow card) 66' Maddie Murphy; 99' Anna Manning	Stadium: FGCU Soccer Complex; Attendance: 408; Referee: Kyle Cividanes; Assistant referees: Miguel Martes; Hayden Oscanoa; Fourth official: Reid Hammil

=== Final ===
November 10, 2024	#3 Lipscomb	1–0	#5 Eastern Kentucky	Fort Myers, FL
1:00 p.m. EST	Tatum Ahlemeyer 7'; Kiara Pralle (yellow card) 88'	Report	(yellow card) 47' Ella Grode	Stadium: FGCU Soccer Complex; Attendance: 204; Referee: Jonathan Weiner; Assistant referees: Kendall McCardell; Carlos Morales-Lastra; Fourth official: Jorge Pedemonte

== Statistics ==
=== Goalscorers ===
There were 19 goals scored in 7 matches, for an average of 2.71 goals per match (as of November 10, 2024).

3 goals

- Kiara Pralle – Lipscomb

2 goals

- Tatum Ahlemeyer – Lipscomb
- Taylor James – Lipscomb
- Hailey Johnson – Lipscomb

1 goal

- Paige Archbold – Lipscomb
- Laura Di Mascio – Jacksonville
- Ellie Dreas – Austin Peay
- Gretta Gunn – Eastern Kentucky
- Ella Grode – Eastern Kentucky
- Anna Manning – Eastern Kentucky
- Emma Nicholson – Bellarmine
- Rachel Robinson – Eastern Kentucky
- Lucy von Stefenelli – Bellarmine
- Erika Zschuppe – Florida Gulf Coast

== All-Tournament team ==
Player	Team
Nina Mazzola	Central Arkansas
Kelly Van Gundy	Central Arkansas
Marah Krick	Eastern Kentucky
Chiara Premoli	Eastern Kentucky
Rachel Robinson	Eastern Kentucky
Olivia Molina	Florida Gulf Coast
Erika Zschuppe	Florida Gulf Coast
Paige Archbold	Lipscomb
Lucy Hurst	Lipscomb
Hailey Johnson	Lipscomb
**Kiara Pralle**	Lipscomb

MVP in bold
