= 2016 ASUN women's soccer tournament =

- Classification: Division I
- Teams: 6
- Matches: 5
- Site: FGCU Soccer Complex; Fort Myers, Florida (Semifinals and Final)
- Champions: Florida Gulf Coast (5th title)
- Winning coach: Jim Blankenship (5th title)

2016 Atlantic Sun Conference women's soccer standings
	Conf.						Overall
Team	W		L		T	PCT	W		L		T	PCT
Florida Gulf Coast ‍†‍‡‍^{y}	6	–	0	–	1	.929	14	–	5	–	1	.725
Lipscomb ‍‍‍	5	–	1	–	1	.786	12	–	5	–	2	.684
Stetson ‍‍‍	5	–	2	–	0	.714	9	–	7	–	2	.556
Kennesaw State ‍‍‍	4	–	3	–	0	.571	10	–	8	–	1	.553
Jacksonville ‍‍‍	2	–	4	–	1	.357	4	–	11	–	1	.281
North Florida ‍‍‍	2	–	5	–	0	.286	6	–	9	–	2	.412
NJIT ‍‍‍	2	–	5	–	0	.286	6	–	9	–	3	.417
USC Upstate ‍‍‍	0	–	6	–	1	.071	0	–	14	–	3	.088
† – Conference champion ‡ – 2016 Atlantic Sun Tournament champion y – Invited to the NCAA tournament As of November 17, 2016; Rankings from NSCAA

The 2016 ASUN women's soccer tournament was a postseason women's soccer tournament that ended the 2016 season of the ASUN Conference. It was held from October 29 to November 6, 2016 and consisted of five matches at campus sites, with the higher seed hosting. The six team single-elimination tournament consisted of three rounds based on seeding from regular season conference play. The FGCU Eagles were the defending tournament champions, after defeating the Lipscomb Bisons 5–0 in the championship match for the program's fourth league title.

This was the first tournament held under the conference's current branding as the ASUN Conference. The league had been known as the Atlantic Sun Conference since 2002.

== Bracket ==
First round Saturday, Oct. 29
4	Kennesaw State	4
5	Jacksonville	1
3	Stetson	5
6	North Florida	2

Semifinals; Friday, Nov. 4
1	FGCU	2
4	Kennesaw State	1
2	Lipscomb	2^{2OT}
3	Stetson	1

Final; Sunday, Nov. 6
1	FGCU	2
2	Lipscomb	0

== Schedule ==
=== First round ===
October 29, 2016	#3 Stetson	5–2	#6 North Florida	DeLand, Florida
3:00 p.m. EST	Sarah Collins 11', 18'; Briana Camargo 46'; Lily Ammon 66'; Hailey Williams 69'	Report	Brandi Walker 33'; Alexis Bredeau 48'	Stadium: Athletic Training Center

October 29, 2016	#4 Kennesaw State	4–1	#5 Jacksonville	Kennesaw, Georgia
7:00 p.m. EST	Kim Fincher 59'; Abby Roth 64'; Brittney Reed 72'; Ashtah Das 78'	Report	Sope Akindoju 87'	Stadium: Fifth Third Bank Stadium; Referee: Chris Heintzman

=== Semi-finals ===
November 4, 2016	#2 Lipscomb	2–1 (a.e.t.)	#3 Stetson	Fort Myers, Florida
4:00 p.m. EST	Ellen Lundy 86'; Niamh Rawlins 110'	Report	Riana Metzger 71'	Stadium: FGCU Soccer Complex; Referee: Ted Unkel

November 4, 2016	#1 Florida Gulf Coast	2–1	#4 Kennesaw State	Fort Myers, Florida
7:00 p.m. EST	Emilie Olsen 22'; Tabby Tindell 47'	Report	Emely Sosa 83'	Stadium: FGCU Soccer Complex; Referee: Shane Butler

=== Final ===
November 6, 2016	#1 Florida Gulf Coast	2–0	#2 Lipscomb	Fort Myers, Florida
1:00 p.m. EST	Ali Rogers 33', 80'	Report		Stadium: FGCU Soccer Complex; Referee: Randy Cook
