= John Shafer =

Playing career
- 1966–1969: Auburn

Coaching career (HC unless noted)
- ?–?: Auburn (assistant)

Administrative career (AD unless noted)
- 1977–1981: Auburn (administrative assistant)
- 1981–1982: Vanderbilt (assistant AD)
- 1982–1998: Georgia (associate AD)
- 1998–2002: Ole Miss
- 2003–2004: Eastern Kentucky
- 2008–2011: Southeast Missouri State

John Shafer is a former American college athletics administrator. He served as athletic director at the University of Mississippi from 1998 to 2002, at Eastern Kentucky University from 2003 to 2004, and at Southeast Missouri State University from 2008 to 2011. Shafer attended college at Auburn University, where he played on the school's baseball team. Shafer announced his retirement from collegiate athletic administration on June 16, 2011.
