= 2018 ASUN women's soccer tournament =

- Classification: Division I
- Teams: 6
- Matches: 5
- Attendance: 1,339
- Site: Campus Sites, higher seed
- Champions: Lipscomb (1st title)
- Winning coach: Kevin O'Brien (1st title)
- MVP: Maycie McKay (Lipscomb)
- Broadcast: ESPN+

2018 Atlantic Sun Conference women's soccer standings
	Conf.						Overall
Team	W		L		T	PCT	W		L		T	PCT
Lipscomb ‍†‍‡‍^{y}	7	–	1	–	0	.875	14	–	4	–	2	.750
NJIT ‍‍‍	5	–	2	–	1	.688	11	–	5	–	2	.667
Kennesaw St. ‍‍‍	5	–	3	–	0	.625	12	–	6	–	1	.658
Florida Gulf Coast ‍‍‍	5	–	3	–	0	.625	13	–	4	–	2	.737
Liberty ‍‍‍	5	–	3	–	0	.625	6	–	11	–	0	.353
North Alabama ‍‍‍	3	–	4	–	1	.438	11	–	9	–	1	.548
North Florida ‍‍‍	2	–	5	–	1	.313	7	–	8	–	1	.469
Stetson ‍‍‍	1	–	6	–	1	.188	4	–	10	–	3	.324
Jacksonville ‍‍‍	1	–	7	–	0	.125	1	–	14	–	1	.094
† – Conference champion ‡ – 2018 ASUN Tournament champion y – Invited to the NCAA tournament As of November 7, 2018; Rankings from United Soccer Coaches Poll; Source:Atlantic Sun Conference

The 2018 ASUN women's soccer tournament was the postseason women's soccer tournament for the ASUN Conference held from October 26 through November 3, 2018. The first round of the tournament was hosted at the #1 and #2 seed's home stadium. Then the remaining rounds of the tournament were hosted by the higher seed. The six-team single-elimination tournament consisted of three rounds based on seeding from regular season conference play. The Florida Gulf Coast Eagles were the defending tournament champions. However, they were unable to defend their crown, as they lost to the Lipscomb Bisons in the semifinals. Lipscomb went on to win the tournament, beating North Alabama in the final.

== Bracket ==
First round October 26
4	Florida Gulf Coast	2
5	Liberty	1
3	Kennesaw St.	1
6	North Alabama	2

Semifinals; October 28
1	Lipscomb	1
4	Florida Gulf Coast	0
2	NJIT	0
6	North Alabama	3

Final; November 3
1	Lipscomb	3
6	North Alabama	2

== Schedule ==
=== First round ===
October 26, 2018	#3 Kennesaw St.	1–2	#6 North Alabama	Hillside, NJ
2:00 p.m.	Erin Harris 61'	Report	Anna Bové 28'; Kylie Huey 61'	Stadium: Kean U East Campus Stadium; Attendance: 102; Referee: Ronny Castillo; Assistant referees: Jamie Dominguez; Jorge Ramirez

October 26, 2018	#4 Florida Gulf Coast	2–1	#5 Liberty	Nashville, TN
7:00 p.m.	Evdokia Popadinova 27'; Cassidy Morgan 57'	Report	Cora Duininck 82'	Stadium: Lipscomb Soccer Comp; Attendance: 136

=== Semifinals ===
October 28, 2018	#1 Lipscomb	1–0	#4 Florida Gulf Coast	Nashville, TN
2:00 p.m.	Logan McFadden 69'	Report		Stadium: Lipscomb Soccer Comp; Attendance: 387

October 28, 2018	#2 NJIT	0–3	#6 North Alabama	Hillside, NJ
2:30 p.m.	Nicole Loehle (yellow card) 12'; Noelle Batista (yellow card) 78'; Nicole Baldassini (yellow card) 89'	Report	Tay Cavett 21'; NJIT Own Goal 73'; Anna Bové 84'	Stadium: Kean U East Campus Stadium; Attendance: 299

=== Final ===
November 3, 2018	#1 Lipscomb	3–2	#6 North Alabama	Nashville, TN
7:00 p.m.	Olivia Doak 15', 50'; Maycie McKay 38'	Report	Margarida Sousa 42'; Shelby Wall 53'	Stadium: Lipscomb Soccer Complex; Attendance: 415

== Statistics ==
=== Goalscorers ===
2 goals

- Anna Bove - North Alabama
- Olivia Doak - Lipscomb

1 Goal

- Tay Cavett - North Alabama
- Cora Duininck - Liberty
- Erin Harris - Kennesaw State
- Kyle Huey - North Alabama
- Logan McFadden - Lipscomb
- Maycie McKay - Lipscomb
- Cassidy Morgan - Florida Gulf Coast
- Evdokia Popadinvoa - Florida Gulf Goast
- Margarida Sousa - North Alabama
- Shelby Wall - North Alabama

Own Goals

- NJIT vs. North Alabama

== All-Tournament team ==
Player	Team
Lindsey Patton	FGCU
Evdokia Popadinova	FGCU
Jessica Aseng	NJIT
Arianna Gerber	NJIT
Anna Bové	North Alabama
Margarida Sousa	North Alabama
Shelby Wall	North Alabama
Brooke Brenner	Lipscomb
Olivia Doak	Lipscomb
Kate Mason	Lipscomb
Maycie McKay	Lipscomb (MVP)
