= Florida Gulf Coast =

Florida Gulf Coast may refer to:

- the portion of the Gulf Coast of the United States in the state of Florida
- Florida Gulf Coast University, in Fort Myers, Florida
  - Florida Gulf Coast Eagles, athletic teams of the University
