= Emily Dolan =

American soccer player

Personal information
- Full name: Emily Rebecca Dolan
- Date of birth: July 22, 1994 (age 32)
- Place of birth: Wilmington, Delaware, United States
- Position: Goalkeeper

Team information
- Current team: Nantes
- Number: 16

College career
Years	Team	Apps	(Gls)
2013–2015	Florida Gulf Coast Eagles	6	(0)

Senior career*
Years	Team	Apps	(Gls)
2014–2016	Lancaster Inferno		
2016–2017	Ravenna	9	(0)
2017–2018	Medyk Konin	27	(0)
2018–2021	Betis	10	(0)
2021–2022	Sporting de Huelva	7	(0)
2022–2024	Espanyol	10	(0)
2024	Nantes	0	(0)
2025–	SF Damaiense	0	(0)
- * Club domestic league appearances and goals as of June 27, 2025

Emily Rebecca Dolan (born July 22, 1994) is an American professional soccer player who plays as a goalkeeper for Première Ligue club Nantes.

== Career ==
In 2016, Dolan signed for Italian side Ravenna. In 2017, she signed for Medyk Konin in Poland. In 2021, she signed for Spanish club Sporting de Huelva. On September 5, 2021, she debuted for Sporting de Huelva during a 0–0 draw with Villarreal.
