= 2017 ASUN women's soccer tournament =

- Classification: Division I
- Teams: 6
- Matches: 5
- Attendance: 1,509
- Site: Lipscomb Soccer Complex; Nashville, Tennessee (Semifinals and Final)
- Champions: Florida Gulf Coast (6th title)
- Winning coach: Jim Blankenship (6th title)

2017 Atlantic Sun Conference women's soccer standings
	Conf.						Overall
Team	W		L		T	PCT	W		L		T	PCT
Lipscomb ‍†‍‍	5	–	1	–	1	.786	9	–	7	–	3	.553
Florida Gulf Coast †‡^{y} ‍‍‍	5	–	1	–	1	.786	14	–	4	–	1	.763
Stetson ‍‍‍	4	–	1	–	2	.714	9	–	4	–	3	.656
Kennesaw State ‍‍‍	3	–	3	–	1	.500	8	–	7	–	4	.526
North Florida ‍‍‍	3	–	4	–	0	.429	9	–	6	–	1	.594
Jacksonville ‍‍‍	2	–	5	–	0	.286	5	–	11	–	0	.313
NJIT ‍‍‍	2	–	5	–	0	.286	9	–	8	–	0	.529
USC Upstate ‍‍‍	1	–	5	–	1	.214	6	–	10	–	1	.382
† – Conference champion ‡ – 2017 ASUN Tournament champion y – Invited to the NCAA tournament As of November 11, 2017; Rankings from United Soccer Coaches Poll; Source:Atlantic Sun Conference

The 2017 ASUN women's soccer tournament was the postseason women's soccer tournament for the ASUN Conference held from October 28 through November 5, 2017. The first round of the tournament was held at campus sites, with the higher seed hosting. The semifinals and final took place at Lipscomb Soccer Complex in Nashville, Tennessee, home of the Lipscomb Bisons, the regular season co-champions and tournament #1 seed. The six-team single-elimination tournament consisted of three rounds based on seeding from regular season conference play. The Florida Gulf Coast Eagles were the defending tournament champions and successfully defended their title, defeating the Lipscomb Bisons in double overtime in the final. The conference tournament title was the sixth for the Florida Gulf Coast women's soccer program, all of which came under the direction of head coach Jim Blankenship.

== Bracket ==
First round October 28–29
4	Kennesaw State	0 (4)
5	North Florida	0 (3)
3	Stetson	0
6	Jacksonville	2

Semifinals; November 3
1	Lipscomb	1
4	Kennesaw State	0
2	Florida Gulf Coast	2
6	Jacksonville	0

Final; November 5
1	Lipscomb	2
2	Florida Gulf Coast	3^{2OT}

== Schedule ==
=== First Round ===
October 28, 2017	#3 Stetson	0–2	#6 Jacksonville	DeLand, Florida
7:00 p.m. EDT		Report	49', 59' Sope Akindoju	Stadium: Athletic Training Center; Attendance: 300; Referee: Elvis Osmanovic; Assistant referees: Cyril Madukaya; Jamie Willis; Fourth official: Trent Vanhaitsma

October 29, 2017	#4 Kennesaw State	0–0 (a.e.t.) (4–3 p)	#5 North Florida	Kennesaw, Georgia
1:00 p.m. EDT		Report		Stadium: Fifth Third Bank Stadium; Attendance: 303; Referee: Rubiel Vazquez; Assistant referees: Larry Pachon; Sergii Demianchuk; Fourth official: Alek Zhelyazkov
	Penalties
	Isabella Contreras (penalty scored); Sydney Crowley (penalty scored); Abby Roth (penalty scored); Morgan Harrison (penalty missed); Carly Pressgrove (penalty scored)		(penalty missed) Sarah Wasser; (penalty scored) Kelli Crowley; (penalty scored) Thais Reiss; (penalty missed) Haley Cook; (penalty scored) Brandi Walker

=== Semifinals ===
November 3, 2017	#2 Florida Gulf Coast	2–0	#6 Jacksonville	Nashville, Tennessee
4:00 p.m. CDT	Cassidy Morgan 29'; Varin Ness 57'	Report		Stadium: Lipscomb Soccer Complex; Attendance: 215

November 3, 2017	#1 Lipscomb	1–0	#4 Kennesaw State	Nashville, Tennessee
7:00 p.m. CDT	Justis Bailey 10'	Report		Stadium: Lipscomb Soccer Complex; Attendance: 376

=== Final ===
November 5, 2017	#1 Lipscomb	2–3 (a.e.t.)	#2 Florida Gulf Coast	Nashville, Tennessee
1:00 p.m. CST	Hannah Torbett 27'; Ellen Lundy 38'	Report	61' Holly Fritz; 74' Camille Knudstrup; 106' Varin Ness	Stadium: Lipscomb Soccer Complex; Attendance: 315; Referee: Skye Arthur-Banning; Assistant referees: Christopher Heintzman; Kevin Huet; Fourth official: James Sherer

== Statistics ==
=== Goalscorers ===
2 Goals

- Sope Akindoju – Jacksonville
- Varin Ness – Florida Gulf Coast

1 Goal

- Justis Bailey – Lipscomb
- Holly Fritz – Florida Gulf Coast
- Camille Knudstrup – Florida Gulf Coast
- Ellen Lundy – Lipscomb
- Cassidy Morgan – Florida Gulf Coast
- Hannah Torbett – Lipscomb

== See also ==
- 2017 ASUN Men's Soccer Tournament
