= Florida Gulf Coast Eagles =

Group of university sports teams

- University: Florida Gulf Coast University
- Nickname: Eagles
- NCAA: Division I
- Conference: Atlantic Sun Conference
- Athletic director: Colin Hargis
- Location: Fort Myers, Florida
- Varsity teams: 15 (6 men's, 9 women's)
- Basketball arena: Alico Arena
- Baseball stadium: Swanson Stadium
- Softball stadium: FGCU Softball Complex
- Soccer stadium: FGCU Soccer Complex
- Aquatics center: Aquatics Center
- Tennis venue: FGCU Tennis Complex
- Colors: Cobalt blue and emerald green
- Mascot: Azul the Eagle
- Fight song: Hail to the Eagles
- Website: fgcuathletics.com
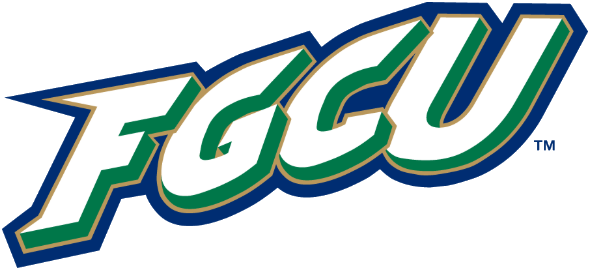

The Florida Gulf Coast Eagles refer to the fifteen intercollegiate athletic teams that represent Florida Gulf Coast University, located in unincorporated Lee County, Florida near Fort Myers, in intercollegiate athletics, including men and women's basketball, cross country, golf, soccer, and tennis; women's-only: softball, swimming and diving, indoor volleyball, and beach volleyball; and men's-only: baseball. The Eagles compete in the NCAA Division I and are members of the ASUN Conference (ASUN). FGCU is also notable as the youngest institution competing in NCAA Division I, having been officially founded in 1991 and started classes in 1997. (Note: Two Division I members were formally founded after FGCU, but both inherited their athletic programs from predecessor institutions that were Division I members.: The University of Texas Rio Grande Valley (UTRGV) was founded in 2013 and began operation in 2015, but inherited its athletic program from one of its predecessor institutions, the University of Texas–Pan American, a Division I member that traced its history to a junior college that opened in 1927.; Purdue University Fort Wayne (PFW) was founded in 2018 when the Indiana University and Purdue University systems dissolved Indiana University – Purdue University Fort Wayne (IPFW), an institution that had been jointly operated by both systems since 1964. The IPFW athletic program was transferred to PFW.) Their mascot is Azul the Eagle.

FGCU athletics began in the NAIA. In 2002, Florida Gulf Coast became an independent member of NCAA Division II. In 2006, Florida Gulf Coast applied for NCAA Division I status and became a transitory Division I effective in the 2007–08 season. Florida Gulf Coast became a full Division I member on August 11, 2011.

In the 2013 NCAA Division I men's basketball tournament, FGCU became the first number 15 seed to advance to the Sweet 16.

== Revenues ==
FGCU Athletics earned $4.5 million in revenue for the 2015 fiscal year, with revenue from ticket sales earning over $800,000 for FY 2015. Men's basketball is the athletic department's "cash cow." Men's and women's basketball account for over $600,000, and baseball draws $28,000 in ticket revenue.

== Conference affiliations ==
NCAA

- ASUN Conference (2007–present)

== Varsity teams ==
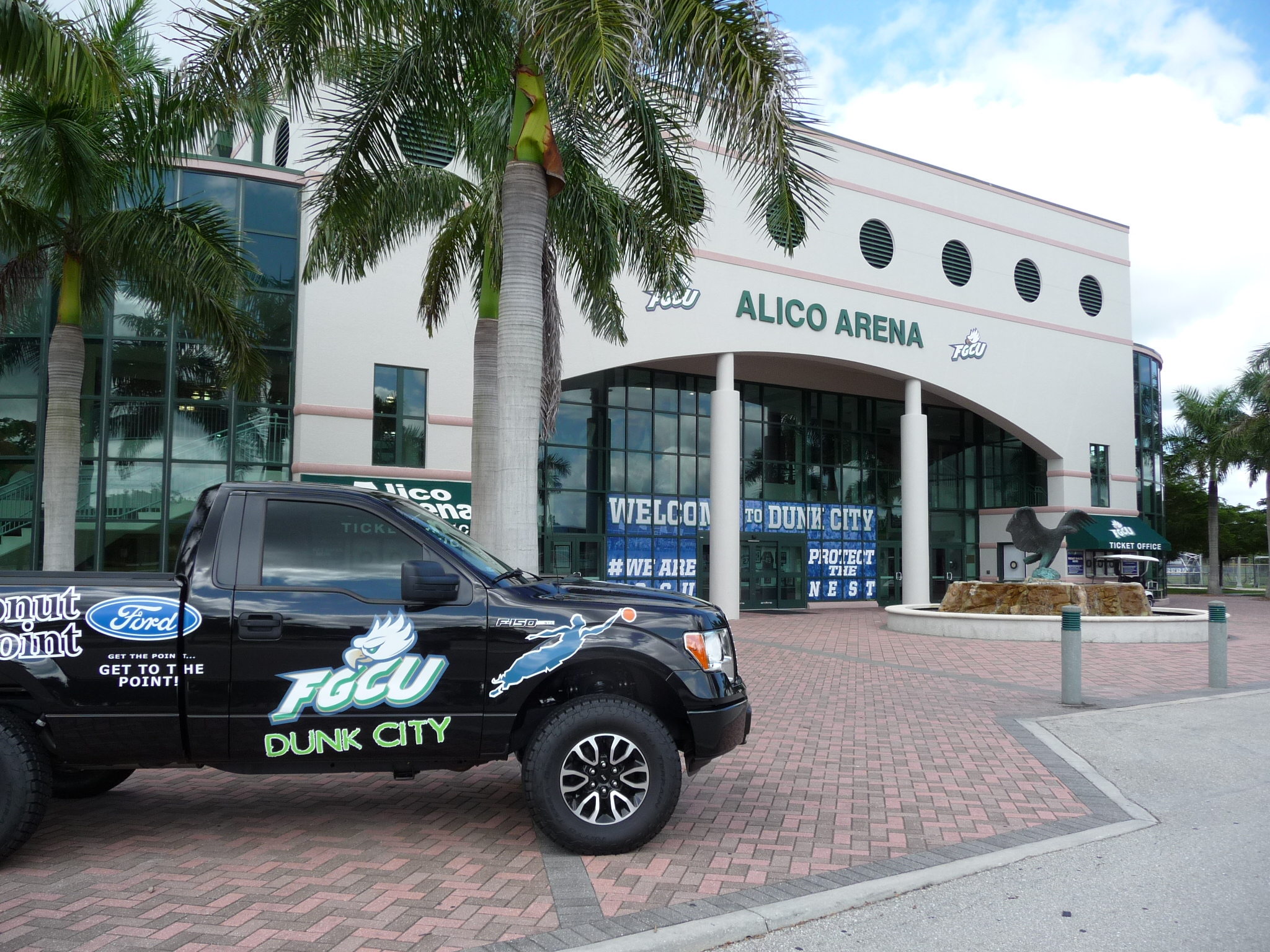
The front of Alico Arena on the campus of FGCU

Men's sports	Women's sports
Baseball	Basketball
Basketball	Cross Country
Cross Country	Golf
Golf	Soccer
Soccer	Softball
Tennis	Swimming and diving
	Tennis
	Volleyball
	Beach Volleyball

=== Baseball ===
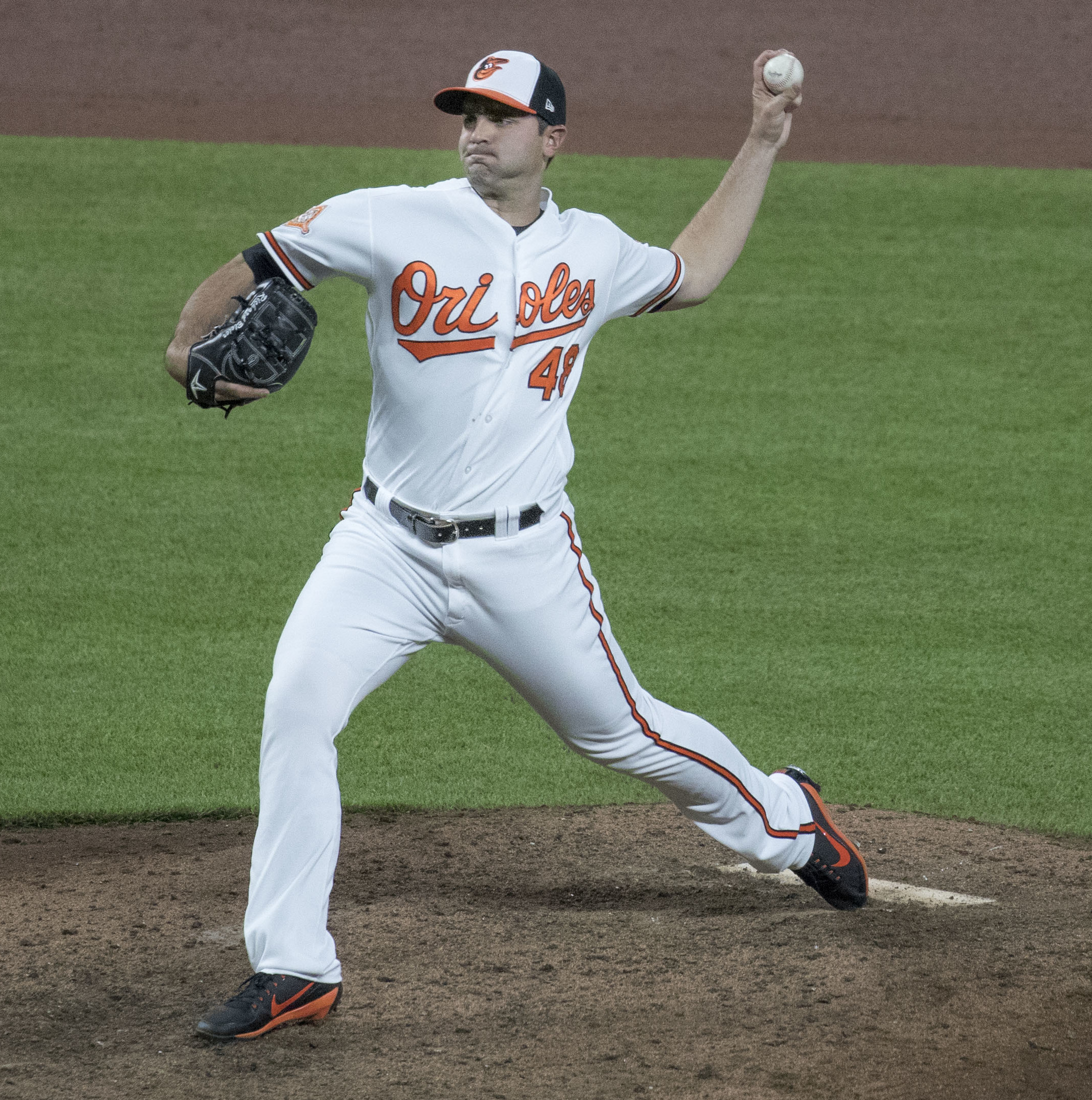
Richard Bleier in 2017

The FGCU baseball team became eligible to compete in the NCAA post season in the 2010 season after the two-year NCAA reclassifying period. FGCU has several former baseball players playing in the minor leagues, and has three MLB pitchers: Chris Sale (Boston Red Sox), Richard Bleier (Boston Red Sox and Team Israel), and Jacob Barnes (Los Angeles Angels).

In 2017, the Green and Blue appeared in the NCAA tournament for the first time in school history. FGCU defeated Michigan in the first game 10–6 before falling in the next two contests of the double-elimination regional to Davidson and UNC, respectively.

=== Men's basketball ===
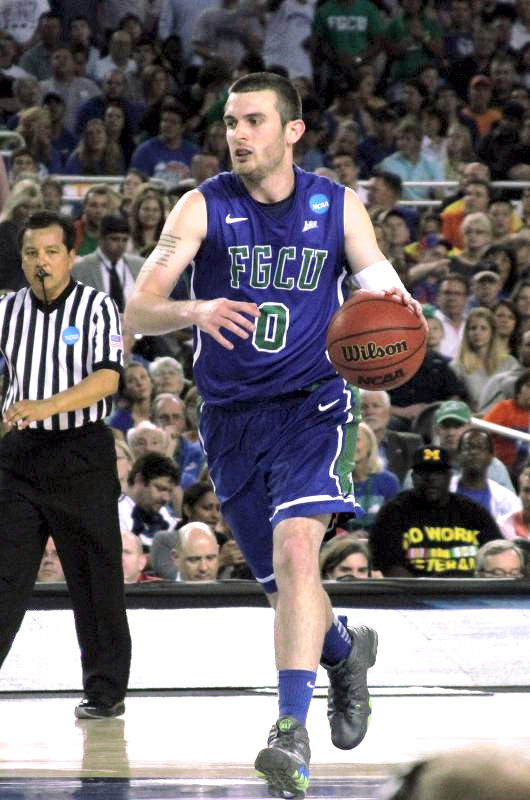
Brett Comer in 2013

In 2012, FGCU's first year of full Division I post-season eligibility, the men's team played in the Atlantic Sun Championship final, losing to Belmont.

In 2013, the team won the Atlantic Sun championship, beating top-seeded Mercer in the conference tournament final. That earned the team an automatic invitation to the 2013 NCAA Division I men's basketball tournament. In its first-ever tournament appearance, the No. 15 seeded Eagles upset the No. 2 seeded Georgetown Hoyas in the first round of the tournament, and the No. 7 seeded San Diego State Aztecs in the second round. The Eagles became the seventh No. 15 seed to advance to the round of 32 and the first to advance to the Sweet 16.

=== Women's basketball ===
On March 24, 2007, FGCU women's basketball team ended their 35–1 season with a loss in the Division II National Championship to Southern Connecticut State University.

One year later, in 2008, the Women's Basketball team qualified for the WNIT, becoming the first team to qualify for the WNIT in its first season of Division I sports. During the 2008 WNIT Tourney, the team became the first Atlantic Sun conference team to win a post-season game since 1998, when Florida International University won in the Women's NCAA tourney. The Women's team won the Atlantic Sun Conference regular season championship with a conference record of 17–3 but was ineligible to compete in the conference tourney, as the team was in transition from Division II to Division I athletics.

In the 2010–11 season, the FGCU woman's basketball team won the Atlantic Sun Conference again. In the 2011–12 Season, the Women's team won both the Atlantic Sun Conference's regular season and conference tourney titles, earning its first berth into the NCAA Women's Basketball Championship. The Eagles lost to St. Bonaventure University in the first round of the tournament 72–65 in Tallahassee, FL.

=== Men's soccer ===
The Florida Gulf Coast Eagles men's soccer team represents Florida Gulf Coast University in all NCAA Division I men's soccer competitions. Founded in 2007, the Eagles are one of the youngest men's soccer programs in the country. The team made the NCAA tournament in the first year of eligibility, in 2011, and returned in 2012. They most recently returned to the NCAA tournament in 2014 where they lost to Coastal Carolina 1–0. The men's soccer team plays its home games at the FGCU Soccer Complex.

=== Women's soccer ===
The Florida Gulf Coast Eagles women's soccer team represents Florida Gulf Coast University in all NCAA Division I women's soccer competitions. The Green and Blue have competed in the NCAA tournament 8 times and advanced to the round of 32 in 2015 after defeating South Florida. The women's team played their first home NCAA tournament game in 2014, before a record crowd of 2,014 at the FGCU Soccer Complex. The team has won 11 ASUN regular season championships and 8 ASUN tournament championships.

== Non-varsity teams ==
=== Men's ice hockey ===
FGCU has a successful men's hockey program. Part of the ACHA, FGCU fields a hockey team at the D2 and D3 levels and often qualifies for the national championship tournaments.
