= Eastern Kentucky Colonels =

Eastern Kentucky University athletic teams

- University: Eastern Kentucky University
- Nickname: Colonels
- NCAA: Division I (FCS)
- Conference: UAC
- Athletic director: Kyle Moats
- Location: Richmond, Kentucky
- Varsity teams: 16 (7 men's, 9 women's)
- Football stadium: Roy Kidd Stadium
- Basketball arena: Baptist Health Arena
- Baseball stadium: Turkey Hughes Field
- Softball stadium: Gertrude Hood Field
- Soccer stadium: EKU Soccer Field
- Tennis venue: Tom Higgins Outdoor Courts
- Colors: Maroon and white
- Mascot: The Colonel
- Fight song: Yea Eastern & Hail, Hail Eastern Maroons
- Website: ekusports.com/index.aspx
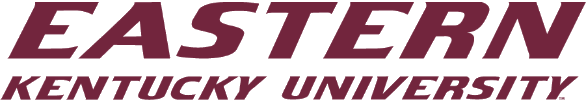

The Eastern Kentucky Colonels are the intercollegiate athletic teams of Eastern Kentucky University (EKU), located in Richmond, Kentucky, in intercollegiate sports as a member of the NCAA Division I ranks, primarily competing in the United Athletic Conference (UAC) since the 2026–27 academic year. Its football team competed in the United Athletic Conference (UAC), which started play in 2023 as a football-only merger of the ASUN and the Western Athletic Conference (WAC). In July 2026, the UAC will become an all-sports conference as a rebranded WAC, with EKU as a member. The Colonels previously competed in the Ohio Valley Conference (OVC) from 1948–49 to 2020–21.

== Overview ==
The Colonels athletic program competes in NCAA Division I as a member of the Atlantic Sun Conference (ASUN). The football team plays in the second level of Division I football, the Football Championship Subdivision (FCS). Before joining the ASUN in July 2021, EKU had spent the previous 73 years as a charter member of the Ohio Valley Conference (OVC). The EKU mascot is The Colonel, and the school colors are maroon and white. While the women's teams were formerly known as the Lady Colonels, the school now emphasizes that all teams are now Colonels.

The ASUN did not officially sponsor football until the 2022 season. In 2021, EKU football competed as a de facto associate member of the Western Athletic Conference (WAC), competing in a football partnership between the two leagues officially branded as the "ASUN–WAC Challenge". The ASUN–WAC alliance was renewed for the 2022 season, and the two conferences fully merged their football leagues after that season, announcing the football league's new branding of United Athletic Conference in April 2023.

== Conference affiliations ==
NCAA

- Ohio Valley Conference (1948–2021)
- Atlantic Sun Conference (Note: The conference officially branded itself as the "ASUN Conference" from 2016 to 2023.) (2021–2026)
- United Athletic Conference (2026–present)

== Varsity teams ==
EKU's intercollegiate athletics teams are nicknamed the Colonels. Maroon has been the official color of Eastern athletics since the school was begun as the Eastern Kentucky State Normal School in 1906, and the school's official team nickname was the "Maroons" from the start of intercollegiate competition in 1909–10 until 1963, when then-president Robert Martin changed the nickname to the "Colonels".

An ASUN member since July 2021, Eastern Kentucky University sponsors teams in eight men's and nine women's NCAA sanctioned sports.

EKU competes in 18 intercollegiate varsity sports: Men's sports include baseball, basketball, cross country, football, golf, tennis and track & field; while women's sports include basketball, beach volleyball, cross country, golf, soccer, softball, tennis, track & field and volleyball.

Men's sports	Women's sports
Baseball	Basketball
Basketball	Beach volleyball
Cross country	Cross country
Football	Golf
Golf	Soccer
Tennis	Softball
Track and field^{1}	Tennis
	Track and field^{1}
	Volleyball
^{1} – includes both indoor and outdoor.

=== Football ===
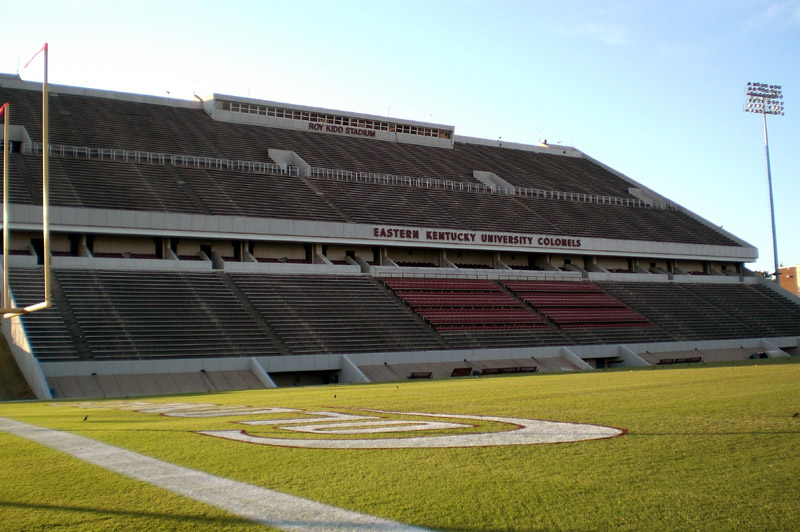
Roy Kidd Stadium, home to EKU Football

Eastern has traditionally been quite successful on the football field, having won 20 OVC titles and two Division I-AA National Championships in 1979 and 1982. Much of the success came during the long tenure of head coach Roy Kidd from 1964 to 2002. In 1990, Eastern honored Kidd by naming the school's football stadium Roy Kidd Stadium. With their win over Southeast Missouri State University in 2008, Eastern's football team secured their 31st consecutive winning season. The team is currently coached by Walt Wells, former assistant head coach at Eastern and most recently a quality control assistant at the University of Kentucky.

In September 2013, the Lexington Herald-Leader, the daily newspaper of nearby Lexington, reported that EKU was considering moving its program to the top-level Football Bowl Subdivision. However, under NCAA rules, such a move would require that EKU first receive an all-sports invitation from an existing FBS conference. In the end, no such move was made.

As noted previously, EKU football now plays in the UAC.

==== Conference championships ====
Year	Conference	Overall Record	Conference Record	Coach
1954	Ohio Valley	8–1–1	5–0	Glenn Presnell
1962	Ohio Valley	6–3	4–2	Glenn Presnell
1967	Ohio Valley	8–1–2	5–0–2	Roy Kidd
1968	Ohio Valley	8–2	7–0	Roy Kidd
1974	Ohio Valley	8–2	6–1	Roy Kidd
1976	Ohio Valley	8–3	6–1	Roy Kidd
1981	Ohio Valley	12–2	8–0	Roy Kidd
1982	Ohio Valley	13–0	7–0	Roy Kidd
1983	Ohio Valley	7–3–1	6–1	Roy Kidd
1984	Ohio Valley	8–4	6–1	Roy Kidd
1986	Ohio Valley	10–3–1	6–1	Roy Kidd
1987	Ohio Valley	9–3	5–1	Roy Kidd
1988	Ohio Valley	11–3	6–0	Roy Kidd
1990	Ohio Valley	10–2	5–1	Roy Kidd
1991	Ohio Valley	12–2	7–0	Roy Kidd
1993	Ohio Valley	8–4	8–0	Roy Kidd
1994	Ohio Valley	10–3	8–0	Roy Kidd
1997	Ohio Valley	8–4	7–0	Roy Kidd
2007	Ohio Valley	9–3	8–0	Danny Hope
2008	Ohio Valley	8–4	7–1	Dean Hood
2011	Ohio Valley	7-5	6-2	Dean Hood
2022	Atlantic Sun	7-5	3-2	Walt Wells
Total		22		

=== Men's basketball ===
The current head coach of the Colonels is A. W. Hamilton.

The Colonels have appeared in the NCAA tournament eight times. The Colonels play their home basketball games at Alumni Coliseum, located on EKU's campus.

=== Men's golf ===
The men's golf team has won 12 Ohio Valley Conference championships: 1975, 1980, 1982–86, 1992, 1997, 2006, 2008, 2015.

== Rivalries ==
Historically, the Western Kentucky Hilltoppers and Lady Toppers served as the primary rival to EKU, especially in football. Their matchups, known as the "Battle of the Bluegrass," date back to 1914, with Western leading the overall series 34–47–3. With WKU's recent move up to the Football Bowl Subdivision, any future games between the two teams are uncertain.

Outside of Western, EKU has maintained rivalries with the only remaining in-state OVC member, Morehead State, and Murray State, which left the OVC in 2022 for the Missouri Valley Conference.

== Facilities ==
Facility	Sport(s)	Capacity
Roy Kidd Stadium	Football	20,000
Baptist Health Arena	Basketball	6,500
Gertrude Hood Field	Softball	400
Turkey Hughes Field	Baseball	900
Arlington	Golf	n/a
Tom Samuels Track	Outdoor Track and Field	n/a
