= FGCU Soccer Complex =

Home field for the Florida Gulf Coast Eagles men & women soccer teams

Coordinates: 26°28′09″N 81°45′48″W

Southern Oak Stadium
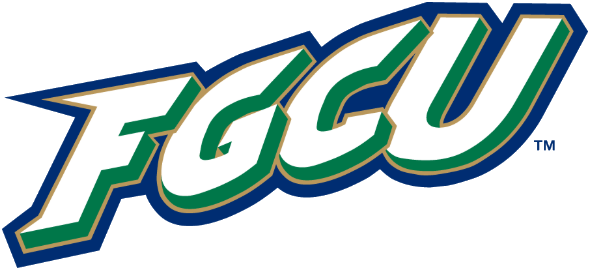

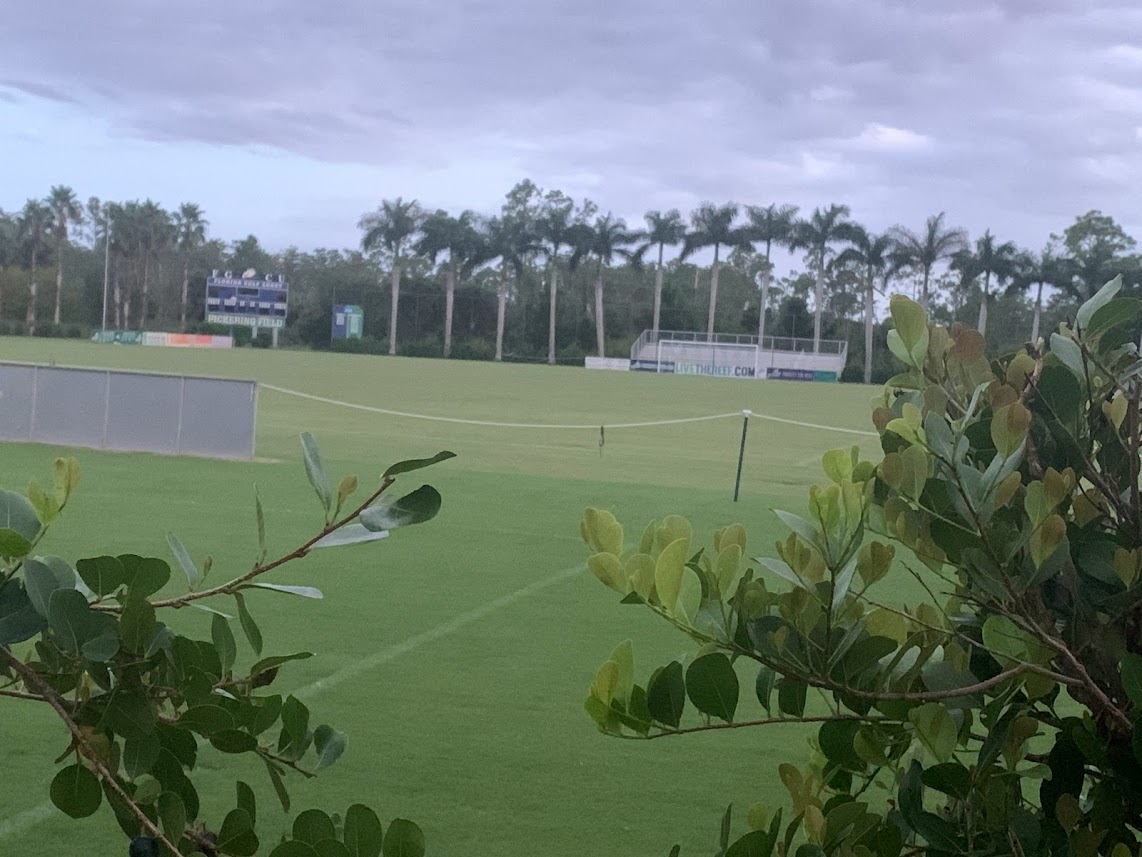
- The field as seen in 2023
- Interactive map of Southern Oak Stadium
- Address: Lee County, FL; United States
- Owner: Florida Gulf Coast University
- Operator: FGCU Athletics
- Type: Stadium
- Current use: Soccer

Construction
- Opened: August 17, 2008; 18 years ago

Tenants
- Florida Gulf Coast Eagles (NCAA) teams: men's and women's soccer; ASUN women's soccer tournament (2011–present)

Website
- fgcuathletics.com/fgcu-soccer-complex

The FGCU Soccer Complex is a soccer-specific stadium located on the campus of Florida Gulf Coast University, a public university in Lee County, Florida. The stadium serves as home venue to the Florida Gulf Coast Eagles men's and women's soccer teams. The FGCU men's soccer team has played at the complex since the team's home debut against UNLV on September 9, 2007.

Starting in 2011, the stadium has been a frequent venue of the ASUN women's soccer tournament finals.

The record crowd for the stadium and for the women's soccer team is 2,014, which was set when the stadium for the first time hosted a 2014 NCAA tournament women's soccer match. The record crowd for the men's soccer team is 1,574 in a 2014 match against Akron.
