= Lipscomb Bisons women's soccer =

American college soccer team

- University: Lipscomb University
- Head coach: Kathleen Paulsen
- Nickname: Bisons
- Colors: Purple and gold

NCAA tournament Round of 32
- 2018, 2025

NCAA tournament appearances
- 2018, 2019, 2021, 2024, 2025

Conference tournament championships
- 2018, 2019, 2021, 2024, 2025

The Lipscomb Bisons women's soccer team represents Lipscomb University in NCAA Division I college soccer. Lipscomb competes in the ASUN. The Bisons are currently led by head coach Kathleen Paulsen.

== History ==
Under the leadership of head coach Kevin O'Brien, the Lipscomb women's soccer program has experienced great success. O'Brien became head coach beginning with the 2012 season.

In 2018, the Bisons were ASUN tournament champions and appeared in the NCAA tournament. In the NCAA tournament they defeated Mississippi State 1–0. In the Round of 32, they lost to Duke 3–0.

In 2019, Lipscomb repeated as ASUN champions and returned to the NCAA tournament. In the NCAA tournament, the Bisons lost round 1 to Louisville.

In 2021, the Bisons won the ASUN tournament and appeared in the NCAA tournament. In the NCAA first round they lost to Tennessee 3–0.

In 2024, Lipscomb won the ASUN championship and qualified for the NCAA tournament. In the NCAA first round they lost to Vanderbilt 4–1.

The Bisons repeated as ASUN champions in 2025 with a 3–0 win over North Florida, earning the ASUN’s automatic NCAA tournament bid. Lipscomb defeated Mississippi State 1–0 in the 2025 NCAA first round to advance to their second Round of 32 appearance in program history. Bella Carapazza's first-half game winner led the Bisons to the 1–0 first round win. In the Round of 32, the Bisons lost to Florida State 1-0.

In December 2025, Lipscomb named Kathleen Paulsen as the new head coach of the women's soccer team.

== Current squad ==
As of November 2026

Note: Flags indicate national team as defined under FIFA eligibility rules; some limited exceptions apply. Players may hold more than one non-FIFA nationality.

No.	Pos.	Nation	Player
0	GK	USA	Sunnie Woodard
1	GK	USA	Audrey Tucker
2	FW	USA	Katie Brightwell
3	FW	USA	Haylee Dean
4	FW	USA	Kinsley Whitecavage
5	MF	USA	Tatum Ahlemeyer
6	MF	USA	Keely O'Brien
7	MF	USA	Teah Vloedman
8	MF	USA	Chloe Iliff
9	FW	USA	Annalise Cannada
11	DF	USA	Colby Cook
12	FW	USA	Addison Millo
13	FW	USA	Amaya Boarman

No.	Pos.	Nation	Player
14	MF	USA	Katie Stefanovski
16	FW	USA	Reygan Ropero
17	MF	USA	Maryn Brown
18	DF	USA	Brianna Bartsch
19	DF	USA	Natalia Carapazza
20	FW	USA	Sadie Wilkinson
21	FW	USA	Skylar Cole
22	FW	USA	Jaide-Simone Prejean
24	MF	USA	Abigail Ross
25	MF	USA	Olivia Strong
26	DF	USA	Naomi Hochgesang
30	GK	USA	Greer Kice
