= North Alabama Lions =

Collegiate sports teams in Florence, Alabama

Coordinates: 34.81°N 87.68°W

- University: University of North Alabama
- Nickname: Lions
- NCAA: Division I (FCS)
- Conference: UAC
- Athletic director: Josh Looney
- Location: Florence, Alabama
- Varsity teams: 14 (6 men's, 8 women's)
- Football stadium: Bobby Wallace Field at Bank Independent Stadium
- Basketball arena: CB&S Bank Arena at Flowers Hall
- Baseball stadium: Mike D. Lane Field at Bank Independent Stadium
- Softball stadium: Hilda B. Anderson Softball Stadium
- Soccer stadium: Cox Creek Sports Complex
- Tennis venue: Cox Creek Park
- Colors: Purple and gold
- Mascot: Leo & Una
- Website: www.roarlions.com/index.aspx

Team NCAA championships
- 7

The North Alabama Lions are the athletic teams of the University of North Alabama (UNA), located in Florence, Alabama. The Lions are a member of the National Collegiate Athletic Association (NCAA) Division I and compete within the United Athletic Conference (UAC). The university has a total of 14 varsity sports teams, seven men's teams and ten women's teams.

Significant changes came to the athletic program on July 1, 2026. On that date, the Western Athletic Conference rebranded as the United Athletic Conference (UAC) and continued operations as an NCAA Division I all-sports league. North Alabama was among five Atlantic Sun Conference members to join the rebranded UAC as part of a strategic alliance with the ASUN. Also, UNA added five sports—women's flag football, men's and women's indoor track & field, and men's and women's outdoor track & field. The new track & field teams will initially be distance-focused, building on UNA's existing cross country teams.

The fall of 2018 marked the Lions' first year of their transition into Division I. They have a storied tradition in Division II and have earned numerous national titles competing in NCAA Division II's Gulf South Conference.

== Conference affiliations ==
NCAA

- Gulf South Conference (1971–2018)
- Atlantic Sun Conference (2018–2026)
- United Athletic Conference (2026–present)

== Sponsored sports ==
The UNA Athletic Department sponsors the following sports. Women's indoor and outdoor track and field was sponsored from the 2015-16 to 2017-18 seasons. In 2026–27, women's track & field will be reinstated, and men's track & field and women's flag football will be added.

Men's sports	Women's sports
Baseball	Basketball
Basketball	Beach volleyball
Cross country	Cross country
Football	Flag football (2026–27)
Golf	Golf
Tennis	Soccer
Track & field (2026–27)^{1}	Softball
	Tennis
	Track & field (2026–27)^{1}
	Volleyball
^{1} – includes both indoor and outdoor

=== Baseball ===
In his first 10 seasons as head baseball coach at the University of North Alabama, Mike Keehn helped lead the Lions back into the regional and national spotlight on the NCAA Division II level with a combined 308 wins and back-to-back trips to the NCAA Division II South Regional Tournament in 2011 and 2012. The Lions 2011 appearance was the first by the Lions in 12 years.

Keehn then led the Lions to another level in 2019 with the move to NCAA Division I status as a member of the ASUN Conference.

The Lions finished their first Division I season at 16–38, facing a rugged schedule, but UNA remained in the hunt for a possible ASUN Tournament berth until the final series of the series. It was just UNA's second losing season in the last 36 years. The Lions had a streak of 30 consecutive winning seasons from 1984 to 2013.

Included in 2019 was a 10-6 road win at then-18th-ranked Ole Miss. It was UNA's first win over a Southeastern Conference opponent in 22 years.

UNA was 3–13 in 2020 in a season cut short by the COVID-19 virus.

A longtime assistant with the Lions, Keehn became head coach in 2009, beginning a new era at the school after 25 seasons under

The 2008 season was a historic one for UNA as Mike Lane stepped down as head coach after 25 straight winning seasons at the school. A major renovation of the school's University Field also resulted in a renaming of the facility in Lane's honor as the facility is now known as Mike D. Lane Field.

==== Early years ====
The baseball program at UNA started in 1932 under coach Eddie Flowers, but it wasn't until Mike Lane arrived in 1984 that the Lions program reached the national prominence it enjoys today.

Flowers was not only the first baseball coach for the Lions, but he was also the athletic director, a teacher for the physical education department, and the first basketball and tennis coach. His most successful year as the baseball coach came in his last season (1948) when the Lions went 15–3. His contributions to the University of North Alabama athletic program led to the naming of the school's basketball arena, which is Flowers Hall.

George Weeks was the baseball head coach from 1949 to 1971. Week's had numerous successful teams during his coaching career, including wins over Division I powers like the University of Alabama. From 1972 to 1975 the Lions were coached by Jackie Pedigo, Ricky Lindsey, and Mike Dean. Mike Knight was the head coach from 1976 to 1978. Gary Elliott coached the Lions to an 18–17 record in 1979. From 1980 to 1983 the Lions were led by Mike Galloway and had a record of 72–87.

==== Mike Lane Arrives ====
It was not until 1984, under Coach Mike Lane that the Lions became recognized as a standout in Division II and Gulf South Conference baseball. In 25 seasons, Lane's teams won 908 games, averaged 36 wins per season, won 40 games or more six times, won five Gulf South Conference championships, and went to one Division II World Series.

Lane's success at UNA began during his first season when the Lions won their first Gulf South Conference baseball championship in school history. In 1985, the Lions finished 46-11-1 and were ranked 2nd in the nation. A 40-13-1 season in 1987 led the Lions to the second-most wins in school history at that time. Another winning season for the Lions in 1988 led to a successful year in 1989 that resulted in a second GSC championship and put them back in the NCAA playoffs. In 1990, UNA was 37–9, which included wins over Division I schools Middle Tennessee State and Mississippi State. The Lions earned their fifth NCAA playoff berth in eight years during 1991. Another successful year came in 1992 when the Lions had their third straight appearance in the NCAA playoffs. UNA won the GSC title again in 1993 by defeating rival Jacksonville State 7–6 in the championship game. The Lions earned another bid to the playoffs and ended the regular season at No. 2 nationally. In 1994 and 1995 the Lions won the GSC East Division title and made another regional appearance in 1995. The Lions finished 1996 with a 37–11 record and 1997 at 40-15-1, winning a fourth Gulf South Conference championship and playing in their ninth NCAA regional tournament in 14 years. The Lions finished the 1998 season 38-12 and were 24–4 at home. Lane's most successful year came in 1999 when he led the Lions to their first Division II World Series in Montgomery after winning the GSC and Division II South Central Regional championships. UNA finished the season with a 45–12 record and finished in the championship tournament.

Five players under Lane have gone on to play Major League baseball. Cedric Landrum debuted in the majors with the Chicago Cubs and played for the New York Mets in 1993. Jim Czajkowshi made it to the majors to play with the Colorado Rockies in 1994. Terry Jones played for the Montreal Expos and Colorado Rockies during his five-year career in the Major League from 1996 to 2001. In 2004, Josh Willingham made his major league debut with the Florida Marlins and he had a break-out season as a starting outfielder for the Marlins in 2006, followed by impressive seasons in 2007 and 2008. He was traded to the Washington Nationals where he played in 2009 and 2010. He played for the Oakland A's in 2010 and has spent the last two seasons with the Minnesota Twins inAlso, former Lion pitcher Sergio Romo has played in the Major Leagues with the San Francisco Giants as a reliever for the last six years, including pitching on World Championship teams in 2010 and 2012.

Under Lane, 17 different Lions were selected All-American by the American Baseball Coaches Association, and six Lions won NCAA statistical national championships. Most recently, James Barksdale earned All- American honors and led Division II in stolen bases in 2006.

==== Mike Keehn Takes the Helm ====
In his 12 seasons as head coach, Mike Keehn has won 327 games and led UNA to six Gulf South Conference Tournament appearances and two NCAA playoff berths.

In 2019, he led the Lions through their first season in Division I. Keehn is the second-winningest coach in UNA baseball history behind Mike Lane.

=== Men's basketball ===
The men's basketball program at the University of North Alabama is one of the most successful in collegiate basketball, having claimed two national championships, made five Final Four appearances and played in 14 NCAA championship tournaments.

The foundation for UNA's success in basketball, and its entire athletic program, was put in place by Eddie Flowers. After coming to UNA (then Florence State Teachers College) in 1929, Flowers began the school's athletic program in 1932 and coached the first basketball team that season. He remained as basketball coach until 1948 and as athletic director until 1969. When the Lions' new basketball facility was opened in 1972, it was only fitting that it be named for the founder of Lion athletics - Eddie Flowers - and was named Flowers Hall.

Ed Billingham was hired as the school's second men's basketball coach in 1948 and he directed the Lions for the next 24 years, winning 249 games. He also led the Lions to the NAIA National Tournament in 1960 and 1962.

UNA's fourth head coach, Gary Elliott, continued the Lion's success story, taking his teams to a 252–140 record overall and a 148–49 record at home. In Elliott's 15 seasons, he led the Lions to their second national championship in 1991, four NCAA appearances in 1991, 1994, 1995, and 1996 and an average of better than 19 wins per season. The Lions have won 20 or more games five times under Elliott. Elliott, who retired at the end of the 2002–03 season, helped place UNA among the division's elite.

Bobby Champagne took over the Lions Basketball program for the 2003-04 campaign, leading the Lions to a 12-16 overall record his first season and a 14–14 mark the following year. UNA advanced to the first round of the GSC Tournament in each of Champagne's seasons at the helm of the program. On Nov. 20, 2004, the Lions knocked off top-ranked Southern Indiana 78–75 at home on its way to a 10–4 record at Flowers Hall.

In 2006, the Lions returned to the NCAA tournament for the first time in 10 seasons finishing with an 18–11 record. Two years later, UNA was back in the Elite Eight. The Lions went 27-9 during the 2007-08 campaign and won the South Region Tournament before falling to top-ranked Bentley at the Mass Mutual Building in Springfield, Massachusetts.

On April 2, 2018, Tony Pujol was announced as the new head coach to lead the program through the transition to Division I. The Lions earned a berth in the ASUN Tournament Championship game in 2021 before falling to Liberty 79-75.

=== Women's basketball ===
The women's basketball program began at the University of North Alabama in the late 1960s as part of the physical education department, but has grown into a nationally respected program that has made four trips to the NCAA Division II national tournament since 1984. Initially competing against other schools in competition known as extramurals, the UNA women's basketball began competing under the Association of Intercollegiate Athletics for Women (AIAW) in 1975, with Susan Phillips as head coach. Phillips coached the Lions from 1975 to 1977 and was followed for one year by Sharron Perkins.

Then, in 1978, the Lions made their first move to regional and national prominence with the hiring of Gary Elliott as head coach. Over the next four seasons, Elliott compiled a 75–42 record that included the 1979-80 Alabama Association of Intercollegiate Athletics for Women (AAIAW) State Championship and the 1981-82 AAIAW Northern Division championship. Those years also produced the school's first women's basketball All-American in Wanda Beckham, who was a second-team AIAW selection in 1980.

Major change came in 1982 when women's sports were included for the first time as championships under both the Gulf South Conference and the NCAA. It was also the year that Wayne Byrd was hired to succeed Elliott as the fourth women's basketball coach in school history. Byrd directed the UNA women's program for the next 16 years, winning 232 games while leading the Lions to one Gulf South Conference championship and four NCAA Division II regionals.

The UNA women's basketball program received its first NCAA Division II Top 20 ranking on January 16, 1984, when the Lions debuted in the poll at No. 20. The 1983-84 Lions were ranked in the Top 20 for eight straight weeks and advanced to the championship game of the Division II South Regional. In 1993–94, Byrd led the Lions an NCAA South Regional championship and a third-place finish at the Division II Elite Eight in Fargo, N.D. The Wayne Byrd era at UNA also included three All-Americans, with LaConger Cohran and Brenda Mayes earning national awards in 1985, and Serita Gauldin becoming the school's first, first-team All-America pick in women's basketball in 1998. In 1997–98, UNA guard Becky Mauck led the NCAA Division II in both free throw percentage and three-point field goal percentage, becoming the first player in Division II women's basketball history to lead the nation in two shooting categories in the same season. Mauck also established an NCAA Division II National Record for three-point percentage in a season at 56.25.

With Byrd's retirement in 1998, Jeri Porter became the fifth head women's basketball coach in school history.

Jeri Porter resigned as women's head coach at the end of the 2001–02 season to take a job with Radford.

Flora Willie led the Lady Lions to a 16–12 record in the 2002–03 season and served as the UNA coach through the 2005–06 season.

Terry Fowler became the sixth head women's basketball coach in UNA history in 2006 and took the first step in rebuilding the winning tradition with a solid 14–14 mark in his inaugural season. UNA's Amber Rutherford led Division II in free throw percentage at 93.7, and the Lions returned to the Gulf South Conference Tournament for the first time since 2003.

Following an NCAA Tournament appearance in 2013, Fowler left to become the head coach at the University of South Alabama. UNA then hired Missy Tiber, who coached for five seasons before leading the program as the school began its transition to NCAA Division I basketball in the 2018–19 season.

The Lions posted a 21–9 record during its first Division I season, earning a No. 4 seed in the ASUN Tournament with a 10-6 league record after being picked to finish eighth in the preseason coaches' poll. The following season, the Lions posted a 21–9 mark, giving UNA three straight 20-win seasons for the first time in program history.

Following a successful debut at the Division I level, Tiber's second Division I team at UNA continued to reach new heights. Led by a senior class that won a school-record 85 games and included the top two scorers in program history, the Lions set 14 school records at the single-season and career levels.

=== Beach Volleyball ===
In 2019, North Alabama added a beach volleyball program to its sports offering as they made the transition to Division I. They play their home matches at a facility adjacent to the Hilda B. Anderson Softball Complex.

In 2023, the Lions found great success under first-year head coach Kaleb VanDePerre as they earned their first 20-win season. The year also saw the team's first All-ASUN First Team selection with the pair of Paula Klemperer and Taylor Seney.

In 2024, the team won their first ever matches against Power 5 programs. The Lions sweep the Oregon Ducks 5-0 in the Green Wave Invitational in New Orleans. They would also go on to sweep the Nebraska Cornhuskers in the Tiger Beach Classic in Baton Rouge.

=== Football ===
Since the rebirth of football at the University of North Alabama in 1949, UNA has been one of the most consistently successful programs in the state of Alabama and on a regional and national level.

As an NCAA Division II member, UNA was nationally ranked in the Top 25 of the final Division II poll 21 times from 1980 to 2017, with 15 Top Ten Rankings. UNA's 21 all-time playoff appearances are the second most in Division II history. In addition, UNA's 35 playoff wins are the second most in DII history and the Lions' 12 Gulf South Conference football crowns are by far the most in league history.

In 2018, the Lions began a new chapter with a transition to Division I and Football Championship Subdivision (FCS) status. The Lions played as an independent in the FCS in 2018 and finished with a 7–3 record. In 2019, UNA played its first season as a member of the Big South Conference and went 4-7 overall, losing three games by a touchdown or less. The Lions were not eligible to rank in the conference standings due to the transition but would have finished fourth with a 3-4 league mark. During the season, the Lions faced four nationally ranked FCS teams, all on the road.

The University of North Alabama fielded football teams from 1912 to 1928 but with little or no success.

Following a miserable showing in 1928, football was dropped at the university. For the next 21 years, there were several efforts made to return football to the Florence campus by writing letters to the administration and gathering names on petitions. Those efforts finally proved successful on March 30, 1949, when President Dr. E.B. Norton held a student assembly to announce that football would return to campus that September.

Since that September day, the university has reaped 67 years' worth of benefits from a football program that has helped put UNA on the map as one of the nation's premier collegiate powers. As an example, North Alabama boasts the highest winningest percentage since 1990 of any collegiate football program from the football tradition-rich state of Alabama at 72.29.

UNA's football success has come through the combined efforts of eight different head coaches, more than 80 assistant coaches and more than 1,200 student-athletes.

Since Hal Self guided the first Lion squad onto the field on Sept. 29, 1949, through UNA's playoff loss that ended the 2009 season, the North Alabama program has made a name for itself like few others in the nation.

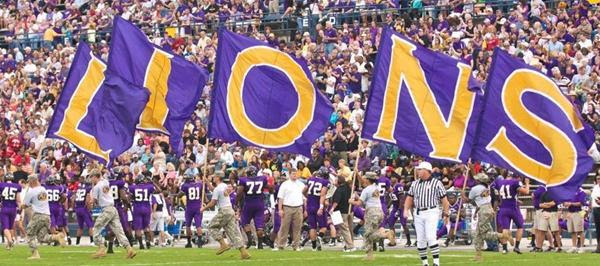
Schools colors and nickname displayed during a football game in 2008

The 2008 season, UNA's 60th since football returned to campus, was emblematic of the Lions’ current position in college football. The Lions posted a 12–2 record and came within one game of playing for the Division II National Championship on its home field. That's because UNA had served as the host for the Division II Football Championship since 1986, and is the only school to have had the chance to claim a Division II title on its home field. Following a record-setting season of his own, North Alabama quarterback A.J. Milwee was the runner-up for the Division II National Player of the Year Award. That award is the Harlon Hill Trophy, named for the former Lion standout end whose name has been on the Player of the Year award since its creation in 1986.

Then in 2009, another historic chapter was written when nationally renowned coach Terry Bowden came to Florence and led the Lions to an 11–2 record, a Gulf South Conference championship, a spot in the quarterfinals of the Division II playoffs, and a No. 6 national ranking in the final poll. It was UNA's fifth straight season with 10 or more wins and fifth straight playoff appearance. It was UNA's 15th overall playoff appearance and the Lions' 27 NCAA playoff wins are also the second most by any current Division II institution. North Alabama's Michael Johnson was named National Defensive Player of the Year by Daktronics and D2Football.com, lineman Montrell Craft was a national finalist for the Gene Upshaw Award as Division II's top lineman and quarterback Harrison Beck was a national finalist for the Harlon Hill Trophy as Division II Player of the Year.

In 2010 the Lions made their sixth consecutive NCAA playoff appearance and finished with a 9–4 record and followed that with a seventh straight post-season appearance in 2011.

In 2013 the Lions made their ninth post-season appearance in the last 11 years and reached the quarterfinals of the Division II playoffs and followed that with a 9–2 record and 19th NCAA post-season appearance in 2014 and a 9–3 record and 20th playoff trip in 2015. In 2016, North Alabama won an unprecedented fourth straight Gulf South Conference Championship, advanced to the Division II Playoffs for the 21st time and advanced to the Division II National Championship Game for the fifth time in school history.

But the Lions can trace their success much further back. The first 30 years after the rebirth of the Lion football program established a strong foundation for the program. Under the direction of Hal Self, the early Lion football teams were a model of consistency, enjoying 12 winning seasons in the first 14 years or the program. The Lions dominated other state institutions, going 12 years from 1952 to 1964 without losing a game to another school from Alabama (31-0-2). The Lions’ first conference title came in 1960 with the formation of the Alabama Collegiate Conference, and UNA would win four straight league titles. The first African American football players also joined the program during the Self era.

Upon Self's retirement from coaching in 1969, Durell Mock became the first, and so far only, former Lion player to become the Lions’ head football coach. During Mock's third and final season as head coach, the university became a charter member of the Gulf South Conference. Three years later Mickey Andrews came to Florence and stayed four years before giving way to Wayne Grubb as the school's fourth head coach.

Grubb would lead UNA to 84 wins, three Gulf South Conference titles, and its first three NCAA playoff appearances in an 11-year stint in Florence.

Following Grubb's departure, UNA turned to Bobby Wallace to continue the Lion tradition and he was more than up for the challenge. In his 10 years in Florence, Wallace led UNA to 82 wins, three GSC titles, six playoff appearances, and three NCAA Division II National Championships in 1993, 1994, and 1995.

North Alabama became the first school in the history of NCAA scholarship football to win three consecutive national championships, and UNA is still the only NCAA Division II institution to have won three straight crowns. Following that 1995 season, the Lions also became the first Division II squad invited to the White House, as the UNA squad met with President Bill Clinton, Vice President Al Gore, and members of Congress.

From 1993 to 1995 the Lions went 41-1 and set a Division II record by ranking No. 1 in the nation in 27 straight polls, UNA also tied a Division II record by winning 28 consecutive home games at Braly Stadium.

Wallace left UNA following another playoff run in 1997 and the Lions elevated longtime defensive coordinator Bill Hyde to the head coaching position. Hyde retired following the 2001 season and Mark Hudspeth became the seventh head coach in UNA history.

Hudspeth spent seven seasons in Florence and put the Lion program back at the top of Division II, winning 64 games and making five playoff appearances. Under Hudspeth's direction, the Lions reached the NCAA semifinals three times, the quarterfinals twice, and had five seasons with 10 or more wins.

With six decades of success already on the books, even more excitement was brought to the Lion football program on December 31, 2008, with the hiring of Terry Bowden as UNA's eighth head football coach.

Bringing a former Division I National Coach of the Year to Florence generated interest for year number 61 of Lion football and Bowden's first team UNA went 11-2 and won the Gulf South Conference championship. In three years in Florence Bowden compiled a 29–10 record with three NCAA playoff appearances.

Bobby Wallace returned to UNA prior to the 2012 season and led the Lions to a 5–5 record before his 2013 squad went 10–3, won a share of the GSC Championship, and fought its way to the quarterfinals of the NCAA Division II Playoffs. Wallace and the Lions followed that with a 9–2 record, co-GSC Championship, and another NCAA Playoff bid in 2014, a 9–3 record, third straight GSC title and NCAA Playoff appearance in 2015, and an unprecedented fourth straight GSC title, an 11–2 record and a trip to the Division II National Championship Game in 2016. Wallace retired at the conclusion of the season as the winningest coach in UNA history with a 126-51-1 record and as the winningest coach in Gulf South Conference history at 152-81-1.

After 15 seasons as an assistant coach on the UNA staff, Chris Willis became the Lions' tenth head coach in 2017, leading the Lions in their final season of Division II competition as well as into the transition as an FCS program. Wilis led the Lions to a solid 7-3 finish in their first season in the FCS in 2018.

With the team's successes have come a remarkable amount of individual accolades. Since 1949, 63 different Lion players have earned first or second-team All-American honors. Wallace was selected as the Division II Coach of the Quarter Century and the 1995 UNA squad was chosen as Division II's Best Team of the Quarter Century (1972–97).

Two Lion players, linebacker Ronald McKinnon (1995) and quarterback Will Hall (2003) won the Harlon Hill Trophy. Center Lance Ancar won the Division II Rimington Trophy as the division's top center in 2005.

McKinnon and quarterback Cody Gross have been inducted into the Division II Football Hall of Fame and McKinnon received the ultimate honor when he was enshrined into the College Football Hall of Fame in 2008. Wallace was also inducted as part of the first class of coaches to enter the Division II Football Hall of Fame in 2010.

On a professional level, the Lions have produced an NFL Rookie of the Year and Most Valuable Player in Harlon Hill, and five other Lions have played on Super Bowl squads. A total of 24 Lions have been drafted by professional teams and 35 more have signed free-agent NFL contracts. Numerous others have played in a variety of professional leagues in the United States, Canada, and Europe.

=== Softball ===
The Lions won the 2016 NCAA Division II Softball National Championship Tournament and finished the season ranked No. 1 with a 60–7 record. The 2016 season was a historical one at UNA that saw many record-setting performances for the program. Aside from winning the school's first-ever national title in softball, the Lions also broke or tied 30 team and individual records at the single-season and career levels. UNA also broke or tied four Gulf South Conference records and also set a new attendance mark for the year. Among the records set during the 2016 season were most wins (60), most games played (67), highest batting average (.353), most at bats (1,825), most runs (488), most hits (645), most RBI (445), most doubles (122), most home runs (90), most walks (183), most stolen bases (93), most complete games by a pitching staff (48), most walks allowed (179) and most innings pitched (426.2). During the regular season, the Lions also won 18 consecutive games to break the previous mark of 13 straight set during the 2005 season. The team's head coach in 2016 was Ashley Cozart who is the sixth coach in the school's history after taking over the helm of the program in July 2013.

=== Women's soccer ===
The women's soccer program at the University of North Alabama began in 1996 as a club sport and moved quickly into the Gulf South Conference and the NCAA Division II in 1997. Since that inaugural season the Lions have won 233 games through 2019, including four straight banner seasons from 2009 to 2012 that saw UNA make four straight appearances in the NCAA Division II South Regional Tournament. The Lions then went 14-4-1 in 2014 and again advanced to the Division II Regionals. Then in 2015, the Lions went 15-3-2, won both the regular-season and Gulf South Conference Tournament titles and advanced to the NCAA Tournament for the sixth time in seven years. In 2017, UNA was 13-4-2 and made its seventh NCAA appearance. UNA advanced to the NCAA post-season tournament seven times in the program's final nine years in Division II.

In 2018, UNA began its first season of NCAA Division I competition as a member of the ASUN Conference and the Lions advanced to the league's tournament championship game in its inaugural season. The women's soccer team's 5–1 win over Alabama State on August 17, 2018, was the first win by any UNA athletic team of the Division I era. The Lions won their first five matches and went on to finish 11-9-1 overall. After earning a spot in the ASUN Tournament, UNA defeated Kennesaw State 2-1 and NJIT 3–0 to advance to the championship match. The Lions fell 3–2 to Lipscomb in the finals in Nashville.

==== Early years ====
The Lions had a solid 6-4-2 record as a club team in 1996 and followed that with a 7–11 record in their first season in the GSC, advancing to the conference championship tournament. In 1998, in the team's second season in the GSC, the team was devastated by major injuries and finished with a 4–14 record. In 1999, the Lions finished with a record of 11-7-1. The Lions finished the season tied for 3rd in the GSC. In 2000, the team managed to finish the season with a solid 11–6 record. UNA's season included a five-game winning streak at one point in the season, but the Lions 4-4 conference record wasn't good enough to put them in to the Gulf South Conference Tournament. The Lions finished fifth overall in the GSC, with the top four teams playing in the league tournament.

Former Alabama-Huntsville standout Aston Rhoden coached the UNA women's soccer teams from 1996 until 2001. Cory Tanzer coached the Lions to an 8-9-1 record in 2002.

Graham Winkworth took over the Lions for the 2003 season, leading them to an 8-11-0 record in his inaugural season.

==== Winkworth Leads Lions to Next Level of Success ====
UNA emerged on the national soccer scene for the first time in 2009 with a 19-4-1 record that included the school's first appearance in the Gulf South Conference Tournament since 1999, the first-ever appearance in an NCAA Tournament, and the program's first post-season win in the regional. That turnaround of 11 wins over the 2008 record of 8-11-1 made the UNA the most improved women's soccer team in the country in 2009.

North Alabama enjoyed another marquee season in 2010, going 16-4-1, finishing second in the GSC and advancing to the GSC Championship Game. The Lions also made their second NCAA Tournament appearance, losing 2–1 to Tampa in overtime. The Lions finished among the Division II national scoring leaders.

In 2011 UNA went 17-4 and claimed the school's first Gulf South Conference women's soccer championship. The Lions defeated West Florida, ending the Argonauts 54-match conference winning streak and later defeated Valdosta State in the GSC Tournament final. UNA again advanced to the regional but lost 1–0 to Tampa in two overtimes.

The 2012 season saw UNA to 13-6-1, advancing to the GSC Tournament championship match for a fourth straight year and to the NCAA regionals for the fourth time. The Lions lost to West Florida in both the GSC final and in the semifinal of the South Regional.

The four-year span from 2009 to 2012 was highlighted by the play of Chloe Roberts, Nikki Brown and Jo Chubb, who were all four-time All-Gulf South Conference selections. Roberts set the UNA career scoring record with 93 goals and she and Brown tied each other for the school record for career assists with 51. Roberts goal, assists and career points (236) all rank among the best in GSC and NCAA Division II history. She became just the 25th player in Division II history to have at least 40 career goals and 40 career assists.

Winkworth's final record with the Lions for his ten-year tenure from 2003 to 2012 was 111-81-8.

==== Chris Walker Era ====
Chris Walker became the fourth women's soccer coach in UNA history prior to the 2013 season and led UNA to a solid 8-8-2 record. In his second season the Lions went 14-4-1, reached the championship match of the GSC Tournament and advanced to the Division II South Regional. That effort earned Walker GSC Coach of the Year honors. UNA was led by junior Chloe Richards who was named GSC, South Region and Division II National Player of the Year after leading the nation in four categories, including most goals scored (26) and most points (57). In 2015, Walker's Lions went 15-3-2, won the Gulf South Conference regular-season and post-season titles and hosted an NCAA Regional event for the first time. In 2017, UNA was 13-4-2 and again hosted an NCAA South Regional contest.

In 2018, Walker led a successful transition into Division I as the Lions went 11-9-1 and advanced to the championship match of the ASUN Conference Tournament. The Lions followed with a 6–11 mark in 2019.

=== Women's volleyball ===
The University of North Alabama women's volleyball program holds numerous conference and regional titles and one Division II national championship, earned in 2003.

For the Lion's volleyball team, 2003 was a year marked with irony. While the team failed to win a GSC title for the first time in eight years, it excelled in the NCAA South Central Regional, Elite Eight and Final Four to secure the first national championship ever claimed by a UNA women's athletic team.

== National championships ==
The Lions have won seven team NCAA national championships, all at the Division II level.

Association	Division	Sport	Year	Opponent/runner-up	Score
NCAA (7)	Division II (7)	Men's basketball (2)	1979	Wisconsin–Green Bay	64–50
NCAA (7)	Division II (7)	Men's basketball (2)	1991	Bridgeport	79–72
NCAA (7)	Division II (7)	Football (3)	1993	Indiana (PA)	41–34
NCAA (7)	Division II (7)	Football (3)	1994	Texas A&M–Kingsville	16–10
NCAA (7)	Division II (7)	Football (3)	1995	Pittsburg State	27–7
NCAA (7)	Division II (7)	Softball (1)	2016	Humboldt State	4–1
NCAA (7)	Division II (7)	Women's volleyball (1)	2003	Concordia–St. Paul	3–1
