= Florida Gulf Coast Eagles women's soccer =

American college soccer team

Florida Gulf Coast Eagles Women’s Soccer
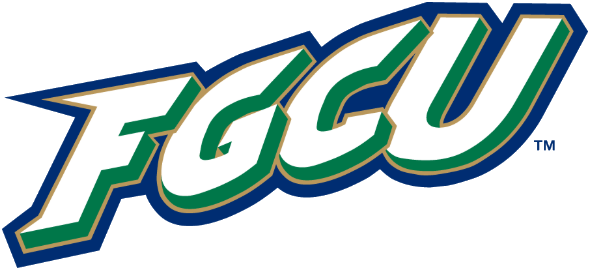
- Founded: 2007
- University: Florida Gulf Coast University
- Head coach: Jim Blankenship (19th season)
- Conference: ASUN
- Location: Fort Myers, Florida, US
- Stadium: FGCU Soccer Complex
- Nickname: FGCU Eagles
- Colors: Cobalt Blue and Emerald Green
Home	Away

NCAA tournament Round of 32
- 2015

NCAA tournament appearances
- 2011, 2012, 2014, 2015, 2016, 2017, 2022, 2023

Conference tournament championships
- 2011, 2012, 2014, 2015, 2016, 2017, 2022, 2023

Conference regular season championships
- 2010, 2011, 2012, 2013, 2014, 2015, 2016, 2017, 2019, 2021, 2024

The Florida Gulf Coast Eagles women's soccer team represents Florida Gulf Coast University (FGCU) in Fort Myers, Florida in all NCAA Division I women's soccer competitions. The Eagles compete in the Atlantic Sun Conference. The soccer team is one of several varsity sports teams that represent the Florida Gulf Coast Eagles.

The team made the NCAA tournament in the first year of eligibility in 2011, and returned in 2012, 2014, 2015, 2016, 2017, 2022, and 2023.

== History ==
The women’s soccer program was formed in 2007 as a result of FGCU athletics phasing into NCAA division 1 status. The team competed in their first match on August 31 in a 10-0 win against Alabama State.

Due to FGCU athletics transition into Division I competition, the Eagles had to wait out a four-year probationary period before becoming eligible for postseason play. In 2011, their first year of eligibility, the team clinched its first conference tournament title and advanced to the first round of the NCAA tournament.

Since 2011, the Eagles have won 8 ASUN Conference tournament championships, 11 ASUN regular season championships, and have made 8 NCAA Tournament appearances.

The FGCU Eagles and UCF Knights currently share the record for most tournament titles (8).

== Stadium ==
The Eagles currently play their home matches at the FGCU Soccer Complex, also known as Pickering Field. The field is 120x80 yards and is Natural Celebration Bermuda grass. The stadium holds 1,500 permanent seats.

On November 15, 2014, Pickering Field became the first FGCU venue to host an NCAA Division I Tournament match. The Eagles faced Auburn in the first round of the tournament with a record of 2,014 in attendance.

== Players ==
=== Current roster ===
As of 26 June 2025

Note: Flags indicate national team as defined under FIFA eligibility rules; some limited exceptions apply. Players may hold more than one non-FIFA nationality.

No.	Pos.	Nation	Player
0	GK	USA	Danyelle Dorn
00	GK	USA	Haley Slouka
1	GK	LVA	Madara Matrevica
2	FW	USA	Sophia Holtzman
3	FW	USA	Megan Morgan
4	DF	SWE	Nellie Nygren
5	FW	USA	Keira Morgan
6	DF	SWE	Ida Nordgren
7	DF	USA	Ariana Cintron
8	FW	USA	Lily Borders
9	MF	USA	Tessa Brooks
10	FW	ESP	Maya Henley Buisan
11	FW	USA	Kendal Gargiula
12	MF	USA	Lyla Bell

No.	Pos.	Nation	Player
13	MF	USA	Erika Zschuppe
14	MF	USA	Lindsey Saad
15	MF	USA	Ryanne Robinson
16	DF	USA	Hanna Phillips
17	MF	USA	Kate Friday
19	FW	USA	Kaitlin Gabelman
20	DF	USA	Lauren Dwyer
21	DF	USA	Elena Hinkson
22	MF	USA	Ava Russell
23	DF	USA	Laina Dayhuff
24	DF	USA	Emma Badger
30	MF	USA	Lexie Bennett
31	FW	USA	Ava Boyd
34	MF	USA	Camryn Bliss

=== Current Professional Players ===
As of June 27, 2025

- (Sweden) Louise Lillbäck (2019–2022) – Currently with Brommapojkarna
- (United States) Leah Scarpelli (2020–2022) – Currently with Brooklyn FC
- (United States) Katie Sullivan (2021–2021) – Currently with Fjölnir FC
- (Sweden) Julia Roddar (2012-2014) – Currently with London City Lionesses
- (United States) Tabby Tindell (2013-2016) – Currently with BK Häken
- (Bulgaria) Evdokia Popadinova (2018-2019) – Currently with Brisbane Roar
- (United States) Emily Dolan (2013-2015) – Currently with SF Damaiense
- (United States) Ali Rogers (2012-2016) – Currently with Fort Lauderdale United (Coach)
- (Republic of Ireland) Jamie Finn (2016) – Currently with Birmingham City

== Coaching staff ==
Position	Staff
Head coach	Jim Blankenship
Associate Head Coach	Alex Ng
Assistant Coach	Nicole Burke
Assistant Coach	Sydney Blomquist

Last updated: August 8, 2025

Jim Blankenship has served as the head coach of the Florida Gulf Coast Eagles women’s soccer program since its inception in 2007. Blankenship has guided the Eagles to a 208-80-35 overall record over the first 17 seasons of the program. Upon entering the 2024 season, Blankenship’s 448 career wins rank 8th among active NCAA Division 1 coaches.

== Seasons ==
List of FGCU Eagles women's soccer seasons
Season	Head coach	Regular season					Postseason	
Season	Head coach	Overall	Conference				Conference	NCAA
Season	Head coach	Overall	Conference	Division	Finish	Results	Conference	NCAA
2007	Jim Blankenship	11-7-0	ASUN	-	3rd	7-4-0	Not Eligible	Not Eligible
2008	Jim Blankenship	10-4-3	ASUN	-	4th	5-2-3	Not Eligible	Not Eligible
2009	Jim Blankenship	11-5-2	ASUN	-	3rd	6-2-2	Not Eligible	Not Eligible
2010	Jim Blankenship	11-4-2	ASUN	-	1st	8–0-2	Not Eligible	Not Eligible
2011	Jim Blankenship	14-5-2	ASUN	-	1st	7-1-1	Champions	NCAA First Round
2012	Jim Blankenship	14-4-3	ASUN	-	1st	7-1-1	Champions	NCAA First Round
2013	Jim Blankenship	13-3-4	ASUN	-	1st	7-0-2	Finalists	-
2014	Jim Blankenship	17-4-0	ASUN	-	1st	7-0-0	Champions	NCAA First Round
2015	Jim Blankenship	14-6-2	ASUN	-	1st	6-0-1	Champions	NCAA Round of 32
2016	Jim Blankenship	14-5-1	ASUN	-	1st	6-0-1	Champions	NCAA First Round
2017	Jim Blankenship	14-4-1	ASUN	-	1st	5-1-1	Champions	NCAA First Round
2018	Jim Blankenship	13-4-2	ASUN	-	3rd	5-3-0	Semi-Finals	-
2019	Jim Blankenship	11-4-2	ASUN	-	1st	6-1-1	Semi-Finals	-
2020	Jim Blankenship	7-3-2	ASUN	South Division	2nd	4-2-0	Semi-Finals	-
2021	Jim Blankenship	10-7-1	ASUN	East Division	1st	7-2-0	Finalist	-
2022	Jim Blankenship	12-6-2	ASUN	-	2nd	8-1-1	Champions	NCAA First Round
2023	Jim Blankenship	12-5-5	ASUN	-	3rd	7-1-3	Champions	NCAA First Round
2024	Jim Blankenship	12-5-5	ASUN	-	1st	7-1-3	Quarterfinals	-

As of 27 June 2025
