= 2026 Tampa Bay Sun FC fall season =

Tampa Bay Sun FC
2026 season
- President: Christina Unkel
- Head coach: Denise Schilte-Brown
- Stadium: Suncoast Credit Union Field
- USL Super League: 7th
- USL Super League playoffs: TBD
- Top goalscorer: Shea Connors (5 goals)
- Highest home attendance: 1,904
- Lowest home attendance: 1,627
- Average home league attendance: 1,685
- Biggest win: CAR 1–2 TAM (8/29; TAM 2–1 FTL (9/12)
- Biggest defeat: TAM 0–3 CAR (10/10)
| Home colors | Away colors |
- All statistics correct as of 23:25, November 6, 2026 (UTC).

The 2026 Fall Tampa Bay Sun FC season is the third season for Tampa Bay Sun FC in the USL Super League. On June 5, 2026, the USL Super League announced the league would hold a shortened 2026 Fall season to set up for a calendar change in 2027 to a Spring to Fall schedule. The goal of the change will allow for better support player movement, roster development and long–term growth.

== Players ==
=== Roster ===
As of September 1, 2026

Note: Flags indicate national team as defined under FIFA eligibility rules; some limited exceptions apply. Players may hold more than one non-FIFA nationality.

| No. | Pos. | Nation | Player |
|---|---|---|---|
| 1 | GK | PUR | Cristina Roque (on loan from Racing Louisville) |
| 3 | MF | USA | Samantha Kroeger |
| 4 | DF | CAN | Vivianne Bessette |
| 5 | MF | CAN | Jordyn Listro |
| 6 | DF | CAN | Sabrina McNeill |
| 7 | DF | USA | Leah Scarpelli |
| 8 | FW | USA | Reagan Raabe |
| 9 | FW | USA | Shea Connors |
| 10 | FW | ENG | Eleanor Dale |
| 11 | DF | USA | Kelsey Hill |
| 13 | MF | CRO | Erika Zschuppe |
| 14 | MF | USA | Alexis Theoret |

| No. | Pos. | Nation | Player |
|---|---|---|---|
| 15 | DF | USA | Brooke Hendrix |
| 17 | GK | USA | Liz Beardsley (on loan from the Houston Dash) |
| 18 | MF | USA | Dasia Torbert |
| 19 | FW | USA | Tori Waldeck |
| 22 | FW | USA | Parker Goins |
| 23 | FW | ENG | Millie Ravening |
| 24 | FW | USA | Kennedy White |
| 26 | DF | USA | Taylor Chism |
| 27 | DF | USA | Samar Guidry |
| 35 | FW | USA | Sydny Nasello |
| 37 | DF | USA | Jordan Zade |
| 44 | GK | USA | Emory Wegener |

Amateur agreement

== Transfers ==
=== In ===
| Date | Pos. | Player | Transferred from | Fee | Ref. |
|---|---|---|---|---|---|
| August 16, 2026 | DF | (United States) Jazmin Ferguson | (United States) LSU | Free | |
| August 16, 2026 | DF | (United States) Leah Scarpelli | (United States) Brooklyn FC | Free | |
| August 16, 2026 | DF | (United States) Kelsey Hill | (United States) Brooklyn FC | Free | |
| August 16, 2026 | MF | (United States) Samantha Kroeger | (United States) Brooklyn FC | Free | |
| August 16, 2026 | MF | (Croatia) Erika Zschuppe | (United States) Florida Gulf Coast | Free | |
| August 16, 2026 | MF | (United States) Alexis Theoret | (United States) DC Power FC | Free | |
| August 16, 2026 | MF | (United States) Dasia Torbert | (United States) DC Power FC | Free | |
| August 16, 2026 | FW | (England) Eleanor Dale | (England) Sunderland | Free | |
| August 16, 2026 | FW | (United States) Tori Zierenberg | (United States) Spokane Zephyr FC | Free | |
| August 16, 2026 | FW | (England) Millie Ravening | (England) Burnley | Free | |
| August 16, 2026 | FW | (United States) Kennedy White | (Australia) Melbourne Victory FC | Free | |
| September 2, 2026 | DF | (United States) Samar Guidry | (United States) Dallas Trinity | Free | |

=== Out ===
| Date | Pos. | Player | Notes | New Club | Fee | Ref. |
|---|---|---|---|---|---|---|
| May 31, 2026 | GK | (Jamaica) Sydney Schneider | Released from club | | N/A | |
| May 31, 2026 | MF | (United States) Gabby Provenzano | Released from club | | N/A | |
| May 31, 2026 | MF | (Switzerland) Sandrine Gaillard | Released from club | (Switzerland) FC Yverdon Féminin | N/A | |
| May 31, 2026 | FW | (Switzerland) Hannah Keane | Released from club | | N/A | |
| May 31, 2026 | FW | (Japan) Yuki Watari | Released from club | (United States) West Florida Flames | N/A | |
| May 31, 2026 | FW | (United States) Jilly Shimkin | Released from club | (United States) Brooklyn FC | N/A | |
| May 31, 2026 | FW | (United States) Madi Parsons | Released from club | | N/A | |
| May 31, 2026 | MF | (United States) Carlee Giammona | Released from club | (United States) Brooklyn FC | N/A | |
| May 31, 2026 | DF | (United States) Victoria Haugen | Released from club | | N/A | |
| May 31, 2026 | FW | (United States) Peyton Parsons | Released from club | (United States) Houston Dash | N/A | |
| May 31, 2026 | FW | (United States) Farrah Walters | Released from club | (United States) Fort Lauderdale United FC | N/A | |
| May 31, 2026 | GK | (Scotland) Braelynn Galt | Released from club | | N/A | |
| May 31, 2026 | GK | (Australia) Isabella Kresche | Retirement | | N/A | |
| May 31, 2026 | DF | (United States) Anna Heilferty | Released from club | (Canada) Montreal Roses FC | N/A | |
| August 13, 2026 | DF | (United States) Jazmin Ferguson | Mutual agreement | | N/A | |

=== Loan in ===
| Pos. | Player | Loaned from | Start | End | Source |
|---|---|---|---|---|---|
| GK | (United States) Liz Beardsley | (United States) Houston Dash | January 28, 2026 | December 31, 2026 | |
| GK | (United States) Darya Rajaee | (United States) Lexington SC | August 11, 2026 | September 3, 2026 | |
| GK | (Puerto Rico) Cristina Roque | (United States) Racing Louisville FC | August 12, 2026 | December 31, 2026 | |

=== Academy player ===
| Pos. | Player | Source |
|---|---|---|
| DF | (United States) Kallie Bleistein | |
| MF | (United States) Jaeda Russell | |
| MF | (United States) Addison Jericho | |

== Competitions ==
=== Results summary ===
| Overall | | | | | | | | Home | | | | | | Away | | | | | |
| Pld | W | D | L | GF | GA | GD | Pts | W | D | L | GF | GA | GD | W | D | L | GF | GA | GD |
|---|---|---|---|---|---|---|---|---|---|---|---|---|---|---|---|---|---|---|---|
| 10 | 2 | 3 | 5 | 11 | 16 | −5 | 9 | 1 | 1 | 2 | 4 | 7 | −3 | 1 | 2 | 3 | 7 | 9 | −2 |

Last updated: November 1, 2026.
Source: GainbridgesSuperLeague.com

=== Regular season standings ===
| Pos | Team | Pld | W | L | T | GF | GA | GD | Pts | Qualification |
|---|---|---|---|---|---|---|---|---|---|---|
| 4 | DC Power FC | 9 | 4 | 3 | 2 | 12 | 9 | +3 | 14 | Playoffs |
| 5 | Dallas Trinity FC | 9 | 3 | 4 | 2 | 10 | 13 | −3 | 11 | |
| 6 | Brooklyn FC | 9 | 3 | 5 | 1 | 7 | 15 | −8 | 10 | |
| 7 | Tampa Bay Sun FC | 9 | 2 | 4 | 3 | 10 | 14 | −4 | 9 | |
| 8 | Fort Lauderdale United FC | 10 | 2 | 7 | 1 | 7 | 16 | −9 | 7 | |

Updated to match(es) played on October 26, 2026. Source: USL Super League
Rules for classification: 1) head-to-head points; 2) total goal differential; 3) total goals scored; 4) disciplinary points; 5) drawing of lots.

=== USL Super League ===
| Win | Draw | Loss |

| Matchday | Date | Opponent | Venue | Location | Result (Note: Tampa Bay's score written first) | Scorers | Attendance | Referee | Position |
|---|---|---|---|---|---|---|---|---|---|
| 1 | August 15 | Dallas Trinity FC | Cotton Bowl Stadium | Dallas, Texas | 1–1 | Waldeck 90+3' | 2,041 | Laadi Issaka | 4th |
| 2 | August 22 | Sporting Club Jacksonville | Hodges Stadium | Jacksonville, Florida | 2–3 | Connors 35'; Zade 76' | 908 | Gloria Martinez | 4th |
| 3 | August 29 | Carolina Ascent FC | American Legion Memorial Stadium | Charlotte, North Carolina | 2–1 | Connors 24' (p); Nasello 75' | 5,907 | Danielle Chesky | 4th |
| 4 | September 12 | Fort Lauderdale United FC | Suncoast Credit Union Field | Tampa, Florida | 2–1 | Waldeck 65'; Connors 81' | 1,745 | Iryna Petrunok | 4th |
| 5 | September 18 | DC Power FC | Audi Field | Washington, D.C. | 1–1 | Connors 62' | 1,399 | Kelsey Harms | 4th |
| 6 | October 4 | Lexington SC | Suncoast Credit Union Field | Tampa, Florida | 1–1 | Connors 31' | 1,904 | Lauren Aldrich | 4th |
| 7 | October 10 | Carolina Ascent FC | Suncoast Credit Union Field | Tampa, Florida | 0–3 | | 1,627 | Marie Durr | 6th |
| 8 | October 17 | Lexington SC | Lexington SC Stadium | Lexington, Kentucky | 1–2 | Dale 15' | 3,918 | Laura Rodriguez | 6th |
| 9 | October 24 | Brooklyn FC | Maimonides Park | Brooklyn, New York | 0–1 | | 733 | Kelsey Harms | 7th |
| 10 | November 1 | DC Power FC | Suncoast Credit Union Field | Tampa, Florida | 1–2 | Waldeck 83' | 1,465 | José Lara | 7th |
| 11 | November 6 | Fort Lauderdale United FC | Beyond Bancard Field | Davie, Florida | | | | | |
| 12 | November 14 | Dallas Trinity FC | Suncoast Credit Union Field | Tampa, Florida | | | | | |
| 13 | November 21 | Brooklyn FC | Suncoast Credit Union Field | Tampa, Florida | | | | | |
| 14 | November 28 | Sporting Club Jacksonville | Suncoast Credit Union Field | Tampa, Florida | | | | | |

== Statistics ==
=== Appearances ===
| No. | Pos | Nat | Player | Total | | USLS | |
| No. | Pos | Nat | Player | Apps | Goals | Apps | Goals |
|---|---|---|---|---|---|---|---|
| 1 | GK | (Puerto Rico) PUR | Cristina Roque | 8 | 0 | 8+0 | 0 |
| 3 | MF | (United States) USA | Samantha Kroeger | 7 | 0 | 6+1 | 0 |
| 4 | DF | (Canada) CAN | Vivianne Bessette | 10 | 0 | 10+0 | 0 |
| 5 | MF | (Canada) CAN | Jordyn Listro | 9 | 0 | 9+0 | 0 |
| 6 | DF | (Canada) CAN | Sabrina McNeill | 8 | 0 | 4+4 | 0 |
| 7 | DF | (United States) USA | Leah Scarpelli | 6 | 0 | 4+2 | 0 |
| 8 | FW | (United States) USA | Reagan Raabe | 3 | 0 | 1+2 | 0 |
| 9 | FW | (United States) USA | Shea Connors | 10 | 5 | 10+0 | 5 |
| 10 | FW | (England) ENG | Eleanor Dale | 4 | 1 | 3+1 | 1 |
| 11 | DF | (United States) USA | Kelsey Hill | 10 | 0 | 10+0 | 0 |
| 13 | MF | (Croatia) CRO | Erika Zschuppe | 8 | 0 | 3+5 | 0 |
| 14 | MF | (United States) USA | Alexis Theoret | 2 | 0 | 1+1 | 0 |
| 15 | DF | (United States) USA | Brooke Hendrix | 8 | 0 | 2+6 | 0 |
| 17 | GK | (United States) USA | Liz Beardsley | 2 | 0 | 2+0 | 0 |
| 18 | MF | (United States) USA | Dasia Torbert | 2 | 0 | 0+2 | 0 |
| 19 | FW | (United States) USA | Tori Zierenberg | 9 | 3 | 3+6 | 3 |
| 22 | FW | (United States) USA | Parker Goins | 8 | 0 | 1+7 | 0 |
| 23 | FW | (England) ENG | Millie Ravening | 0 | 0 | 0+0 | 0 |
| 24 | FW | (United States) USA | Kennedy White | 6 | 0 | 2+4 | 0 |
| 26 | DF | (United States) USA | Taylor Chism | 9 | 0 | 8+1 | 0 |
| 27 | DF | (United States) USA | Samar Guidry | 7 | 0 | 5+2 | 0 |
| 35 | FW | (United States) USA | Sydny Nasello | 10 | 1 | 10+0 | 1 |
| 37 | DF | (United States) USA | Jordan Zade | 10 | 1 | 6+4 | 1 |
| 44 | GK | (United States) USA | Emory Wegener | 0 | 0 | 0+0 | 0 |
| | DF | (United States) USA | Jazmin Ferguson | 0 | 0 | 0+0 | 0 |
| | MF | (United States) USA | Darya Rajaee | 3 | 0 | 1+2 | 0 |

- Last updated: November 1, 2026
- Source: https://www.austinfc.com/stats/

=== Goalscorers ===
As of November 1, 2026

| Rank | No. | Nat. | Name | USLS | Playoffs | Total |
|---|---|---|---|---|---|---|
| 1 | 9 | (United States) | Shea Connors | 5 | 0 | 5 |
| 2 | 19 | (United States) | Tori Waldeck | 3 | 0 | 3 |
| 3 | 10 | (England) | Eleanor Dale | 1 | 0 | 1 |
| 3 | 35 | (United States) | Sydny Nasello | 1 | 0 | 1 |
| 3 | 37 | (United States) | Jordan Zade | 1 | 0 | 1 |
| Own goals | | | | 0 | 0 | 0 |
| Total | | | | 12 | 0 | 12 |

=== Assists ===
As of November 1, 2026

| Rank | No. | Nat. | Name | USLS | Playoffs | Total |
|---|---|---|---|---|---|---|
| 1 | 35 | (United States) | Sydny Nasello | 2 | 0 | 2 |
| 1 | 37 | (United States) | Jordan Zade | 2 | 0 | 2 |
| 3 | 4 | (Canada) | Vivianne Bessette | 1 | 0 | 1 |
| 3 | 6 | (Canada) | Jordyn Listro | 1 | 0 | 1 |
| 3 | 6 | (Canada) | Sabrina McNeill | 1 | 0 | 1 |
| 3 | 19 | (United States) | Tori Waldeck | 1 | 0 | 1 |
| 3 | | (United States) | Darya Rajaee | 1 | 0 | 1 |
| Total | | | | 8 | 0 | 8 |

=== Disciplinary record ===
As of November 1, 2026

| Player | | | Regular Season | | | Playoffs | | | Total | | |
| No. | Nat. | Name | Yellow card | (yellow card) (yellow-red card) | Red card | Yellow card | (yellow card) (yellow-red card) | Red card | Yellow card | (yellow card) (yellow-red card) | Red card |
|---|---|---|---|---|---|---|---|---|---|---|---|
| 5 | (Canada) | Jordyn Listro | 1 | 0 | 0 | 0 | 0 | 0 | 1 | 0 | 0 |
| 6 | (Canada) | Sabrina McNeill | 2 | 0 | 0 | 0 | 0 | 0 | 2 | 0 | 0 |
| 7 | (United States) | Leah Scarpelli | 1 | 0 | 0 | 0 | 0 | 0 | 1 | 0 | 0 |
| 9 | (United States) | Shea Connors | 4 | 0 | 0 | 0 | 0 | 0 | 4 | 0 | 0 |
| 11 | (United States) | Kelsey Hill | 3 | 0 | 0 | 0 | 0 | 0 | 3 | 0 | 0 |
| 15 | (United States) | Brooke Hendrix | 1 | 0 | 0 | 0 | 0 | 0 | 1 | 0 | 0 |
| 18 | (United States) | Dasia Torbert | 1 | 0 | 0 | 0 | 0 | 0 | 1 | 0 | 0 |
| 35 | (United States) | Sydny Nasello | 2 | 0 | 0 | 0 | 0 | 0 | 2 | 0 | 0 |
| | (United States) | Darya Rajaee | 1 | 0 | 0 | 0 | 0 | 0 | 1 | 0 | 0 |
| Total | | | 15 | 0 | 0 | 0 | 0 | 0 | 15 | 0 | 0 |
