= List of Tampa Bay Sun FC players =

Tampa Bay Sun FC is an American professional women's soccer club which began play in the inaugural season of the USL Super League. All players who have made a competitive appearance for Tampa Bay Sun FC are listed below.

== Key ==
- The list is ordered alphabetically.
- Appearances as a substitute are included.
- Statistics are correct as of May 16, 2026, the end of the 2025–26 USL Super League season, and are updated once a year after the conclusion of the USL Super League season.
- Players whose names are highlighted in **bold** were active players on the Sun FC roster as of the list's most recent update.

Positions key
GK	Goalkeeper
DF	Defender
MF	Midfielder
FW	Forward

Nationality
Unless otherwise noted, the nationality of a player is determined by the country they most recently represented in international play, or if said player has not played international football then by their country of birth.
Position
Playing positions are listed according to the player's roster designation as of the list's most recent update.
Years
Years are defined as the first and last calendar years in which the player was rostered for the club in any of the competitions listed below.
Appearances and goals
This list counts appearances and goals in the USL Super League and USL Super League playoffs.

== Players ==
Yrs	No.	Pos	Nat	Player	Total		USL Super League		Playoffs	
Yrs	No.	Pos	Nat	Player	Apps	Goals	Apps	Goals	Apps	Goals
2024–2025	22	DF	(United States) USA	Paige Almendariz	17	2	15	2	2	0
2025–	23	MF	(United States) USA	McKenna Battilla	5	0	5	0	0	0
2026–	33	GK	(United States) USA	Liz Beardsley	7	0	7	0	0	0
2024–	4	DF	(Canada) CAN	Vivianne Bessette	57	1	55	1	2	0
2024–	16	DF	(United States) USA	Siena Bryan	11	0	11	0	0	0
2026–	26	DF	(United States) USA	Taylor Chism	14	0	14	0	0	0
2024–2025	24	FW	(United States) USA	Ashley Clark	17	1	16	1	1	0
2026–	39	FW	(United States) USA	Shea Connors	4	1	4	1	0	0
2024–2025	23	DF	(United States) USA	Brooke Denesik	1	0	1	0	0	0
2024–2025	6	FW	(Ghana) GHA	Wasila Diwura-Soale	11	0	11	0	0	0
2024	11	DF	(United States) USA	Kristen Edmonds	13	0	13	0	0	0
2025	14	DF	(United States) USA	Emerson Elgin	2	0	2	0	0	0
2024	3	DF	(Mexico) MEX	Jazmín Enrigue	1	0	1	0	0	0
2024–2026	9	FW	(England) ENG	Natasha Flint	33	11	31	10	2	1
2024–2025	13	FW	(Denmark) DEN	Cecilie Fløe	24	12	22	11	2	1
2025–2026	28	MF	(United States) USA	Jordan Fusco	4	2	4	2	0	0
2025–	7	MF	(Switzerland) SUI	Sandrine Gaillard	24	1	24	1	0	0
2025	13	FW	(United States) USA	Emma Gaines-Ramos	11	0	11	0	0	0
2024–	19	MF	(United States) USA	Carlee Giammona	56	13	54	12	2	1
2025–	11, 22	FW	(United States) USA	Parker Goins	17	2	15	2	2	0
2025–	20	DF	(Norway) NOR	Victoria Haugen	33	1	31	1	2	0
2026–	77	DF	(United States) USA	Anna Heilferty	6	0	6	0	0	0
2024–	15	DF	(United States) USA	Brooke Hendrix (Note: Hendrix scored the Sun's inaugural goal, which came against Dallas Trinity FC on August 22, 2024.)	57	1	55	1	2	0
2024–	8	FW	(United States) USA	Hannah Keane	15	2	13	2	2	0
2024	99	GK	(United States) USA	Lauren Kozal	5	0	5	0	0	0
2025–	31	GK	(Austria) AUT	Isabella Kresche	2	0	2	0	0	0
2024–	5	MF	(Canada) CAN	Jordyn Listro (Note: Erika Tymrak, Jordyn Listro, and Domi Richardson were the Sun's inaugural signings, announced on April 23, 2024.)	57	1	55	1	2	0
2024–2025	18	GK	(United States) USA	Kaylan Marckese	1	0	1	0	0	0
2024–2025	20	FW	(Colombia) COL	Ella Martínez	2	0	2	0	0	0
2025	2	DF	(Australia) AUS	Charlotte McLean	4	0	4	0	0	0
2025–	6	DF	(Canada) CAN	Sabrina McNeill	26	2	26	2	0	0
2024–2025	12	MF	(England) ENG	Jade Moore	24	1	22	1	2	0
2024–	35	FW	(United States) USA	Sydny Nasello	58	10	56	10	2	0
2024–2025	28	GK	(United States) USA	Ashley Orkus	21	0	19	0	2	0
2024	31	FW	(United States) USA	Riley Parker	10	0	10	0	0	0
2025	32	MF	(United States) USA	Alyssa Parsons	1	0	1	0	0	0
2025–	18	FW	(United States) USA	Madi Parsons	15	2	15	2	0	0
2026–	25	FW	(United States) USA	Peyton Parsons	7	0	7	0	0	0
2024–2025	32	MF	(United States) USA	Aaliyah Pitts	2	0	2	0	0	0
2025	24	MF	(United States) USA	Mackenzie Pluck	13	0	13	0	0	0
2026–	12	MF	(United States) USA	Maddie Pokorny	11	0	11	0	0	0
2025–	3	MF	(United States) USA	Gabby Provenzano	30	1	28	1	2	0
2024–2025	21	MF	(United States) USA	Domi Richardson	5	0	5	0	0	0
2025–	31, 1	GK	(Jamaica) JAM	Sydney Schneider	16	0	16	0	0	0
2025–	11	MF	(United States) USA	Jilly Shimkin	23	1	23	1	0	0
2024–2025	2	DF	(United States) USA	Jackie Simpson	6	0	6	0	0	0
2024–2025	29	MF	(Iceland) ISL	Andrea Rán Snæfeld Hauksdóttir	15	0	15	0	0	0
2024	33	DF	(United States) USA	Talia Staude	12	1	12	1	0	0
2025	45, 21	FW	(United States) USA	Ava Tankersley	13	2	13	2	0	0
2024–2025	7	MF	(United States) USA	Erika Tymrak	1	0	1	0	0	0
2026–	27	FW	(United States) USA	Farrah Walters	1	0	1	0	0	0
2026–	42	FW	(United States) USA	Faith Webber	14	2	14	2	0	0
2025–	44	GK	(United States) USA	Emory Wegener	8	0	8	0	0	0
2025–	37	DF	(United States) USA	Jordan Zade	34	0	32	0	2	0

== By nationality ==
In total, 53 players representing 13 different countries have appeared for Tampa Bay Sun FC.

Note: Countries indicate national team as defined under FIFA eligibility rules. Players may hold more than one non-FIFA nationality.

Country	Total players
Australia	1
Austria	1
Canada	3
Colombia	1
Denmark	1
England	2
Ghana	1
Iceland	1
Jamaica	1
Mexico	1
Norway	1
Switzerland	1
United States	31

== See also ==
- List of top-division football clubs in CONCACAF countries
- List of professional sports teams in the United States and Canada
