= 2025–26 Tampa Bay Sun FC season =

Tampa Bay Sun FC
2025–26 season
- President: Christina Unkel
- Head coach: Denise Schilte-Brown
- Stadium: Suncoast Credit Union Field
- USL Super League: 8th
- USL Super League playoffs: Did not qualify
- Top goalscorer: Sydny Nasello (8 goals)
- Highest home attendance: 2,896
- Lowest home attendance: 1,468
- Average home league attendance: 1,936
- Biggest win: TAM 3–0 FTL (2/21)
- Biggest defeat: LEX 4–0 TAM (4/18)
Home colors	Away colors
- All statistics correct as of 00:41, July 17, 2026 (UTC).

The 2025–26 Tampa Bay Sun FC season is the second season for Tampa Bay Sun FC in the USL Super League. Tampa Bay won the inaugural USL Super League championship, 1–0 against Fort Lauderdale United FC.

== Players ==
=== Roster ===
As of March 17, 2026

Note: Flags indicate national team as defined under FIFA eligibility rules; some limited exceptions apply. Players may hold more than one non-FIFA nationality.

No.	Pos.	Nation	Player
1	GK	JAM	Sydney Schneider
3	MF	USA	Gabby Provenzano
4	DF	CAN	Vivianne Bessette
5	MF	CAN	Jordyn Listro
6	DF	CAN	Sabrina McNeill
7	MF	SUI	Sandrine Gaillard
8	FW	USA	Hannah Keane
10	MF	JPN	Yuki Watari
11	MF	USA	Jilly Shimkin
12	MF	USA	Maddie Pokorny (on loan from Racing Louisville FC)
15	DF	USA	Brooke Hendrix
16	DF	USA	Siena Bryan
17	FW	COD	Olga Massombo
18	FW	USA	Madi Parsons
19	MF	USA	Carlee Giammona
20	DF	NOR	Victoria Haugen

No.	Pos.	Nation	Player
22	FW	USA	Parker Goins
23	MF	USA	McKenna Batilla
25	FW	USA	Peyton Parsons
26	DF	USA	Taylor Chism
27	FW	USA	Farrah Walters
28	MF	USA	Jordan Fusco
29	FW	USA	Maci Tucker
30	GK	SCO	Braelynn Galt
31	GK	AUT	Bella Kresche
33	GK	USA	Liz Beardsley (on loan from Houston Dash)
35	FW	USA	Sydny Nasello
37	DF	USA	Jordan Zade
39	FW	USA	Shea Connors
42	FW	USA	Faith Webber
44	GK	USA	Emory Wegener
77	DF	USA	Anna Heilferty

Amateur agreement

== Transfers ==
=== In ===
Date	Pos.	Player	Transferred from	Fee	Ref.
June 29, 2025	MF	(Switzerland) Sandrine Mauron	(Switzerland) Servette		
July 16, 2025	FW	(Democratic Republic of the Congo) Olga Massombo	(Mexico) Mazatlán		
July 17, 2025	MF/FW	(United States) Jilly Shimkin	(United States) Texas	Free	
July 18, 2025	GK	(United States) Emory Wegener	(United States) Maryland	Free	
July 18, 2025	DF	(United States) Sabrina McNeill	(United States) Fort Lauderdale United FC		
July 21, 2025	GK	(Austria) Isabella Kresche	(Italy) Roma		
August 8, 2025	MF	(United States) Mackenzie Pluck	(United States) Brooklyn FC		
November 7, 2025	FW	(United States) Madi Parsons	(United States) Lexington SC		
January 29, 2026	DF	(United States) Taylor Chism	(United States) Auburn		
March 16, 2026	FW	(United States) Peyton Parsons	(United States) Texas Tech		
March 17, 2026	FW	(United States) Farrah Walters	(United States) Duke		
April 2, 2026	DF	(United States) Anna Heilferty	(United States) Houston Dash	free agent	
April 21, 2026	FW	(United States) Shea Connors	(Australia) Sydney FC	free agent	

=== Out ===
Date	Pos.	Player	Notes	Transferred to	Fee	Ref.
June 29, 2025	MF	(England) Jade Moore	Retirement			
June 29, 2025	MF	(United States) Erika Tymrak	Retirement			
June 29, 2025	DF	(United States) Paige Almendariz	Released from club	(United States) DC Power FC	N/A	
June 29, 2025	FW	(United States) Ashley Clark	Released from club	(Iceland) Víkingur Reykjavík	N/A	
June 29, 2025	DF	(United States) Brooke Denesik	Released from club		N/A	
June 29, 2025	MF	(Ghana) Wasila Diwura-Soale	Released from club		N/A	
June 29, 2025	MF	(Iceland) Andrea Hauksdóttir	Released from club	(Iceland) FH	N/A	
June 29, 2025	GK	(United States) Kaylan Marckese	Released from club		N/A	
June 29, 2025	GK	(United States) Ashley Orkus	Released from club	(Iceland) Fram	N/A	
June 29, 2025	DF	(United States) Domi Richardson	Released from club		N/A	
June 29, 2025	DF	(United States) Jackie Simpson	Released from club		N/A	
July 18, 2025	DF	(Denmark) Cecilie Fløe	Transfer	(Italy) Napoli		
January 7, 2026	MF	(United States) Alyssa Parsons	Started college	(United States) USC	N/A	
January 15, 2026	FW	(Democratic Republic of the Congo) Olga Massombo	Mutual agreement	(Turkey) Fenerbahçe	N/A	
January 16, 2026	MF	(United States) Mackenzie Pluck	Retirement			
January 23, 2026	FW	(United States) Ava Tankersley	Retirement			
April 16, 2026	FW	(England) Natasha Flint	Transfer	(United States) Denver Summit FC		

=== Loan in ===
Pos.	Player	Loaned from	Start	End	Source
DF	(Australia) Charlotte McLean	(United States) North Carolina Courage	July 15, 2025	January 9, 2026	
MF	(United States) Emerson Elgin	(United States) Boston Legacy FC	July 18, 2025	December 31, 2025	
FW	(United States) Emma Gaines-Ramos	(United States) Washington Spirit	July 22, 2025	January 21, 2026	
MF	(United States) Jordan Fusco	(United States) San Diego Wave FC	December 17, 2025	June 30, 2026	
MF	(United States) Maddie Pokorny	(United States) Racing Louisville FC	January 23, 2026	June 30, 2026	
GK	(United States) Liz Beardsley	(United States) Houston Dash	January 28, 2026	December 31, 2026	
FW	(United States) Faith Webber	(United States) Denver Summit FC	January 28, 2026	June 30, 2026	

=== Loan out ===
Pos.	Player	Loaned from	Start	End	Source
FW	(England) Natasha Flint	(United States) Denver Summit FC	January 30, 2026	April 17, 2026	

=== Academy player ===
Pos.	Player	Source
DF	(United States) Siena Bryan	
MF	(United States) McKenna Batilla	
GK	(Scotland) Braelynn Galt	
FW	(United States) Maci Tucker	

== Competitions ==
=== Results summary ===
Overall								Home						Away					
Pld	W	D	L	GF	GA	GD	Pts	W	D	L	GF	GA	GD	W	D	L	GF	GA	GD
28	4	9	15	25	47	−22	21	2	5	8	14	24	−10	2	4	7	11	23	−12

Last updated: May 16, 2026.
Source: GainbridgesSuperLeague.com

=== Regular season standings ===
Pos	Team	Pld	W	L	T	GF	GA	GD	Pts
5	Spokane Zephyr	28	10	9	9	34	28	+6	39
6	DC Power	28	8	11	9	34	32	+2	33
7	Brooklyn	28	6	14	8	31	44	−13	26
8	Tampa Bay Sun	28	5	14	9	27	46	−19	24
9	Fort Lauderdale United	28	5	15	8	30	62	−32	23

Updated to match(es) played on May 16, 2026. Source: Gainbridge Super League
Rules for classification: 1) head-to-head points; 2) total goal differential; 3) total goals scored; 4) disciplinary points; 5) drawing of lots.

=== USL Super League ===
Win	Draw	Loss

Matchday	Date	Opponent	Venue	Location	Result (Note: Tampa Bay's score written first)	Scorers	Attendance	Referee	Position
1	August 23, 2025	Brooklyn FC	Maimonides Park	Brooklyn, New York	1–2	Giammona 90+4'	1,275	Kaitlyn Trowbridge	8th
2	August 30, 2025	Sporting JAX	Suncoast Credit Union Field	Tampa Bay, Florida	2–3	Gaillard 70'; Giammona 72'	1,682	Rachel Swett	9th
3	September 6, 2025	Carolina Ascent FC	American Legion Memorial Stadium	Charlotte, North Carolina	2–2	Nasello 74'; Provenzano 81'	4,150	Marie Durr	9th
4	September 13, 2025	Spokane Zephyr FC	One Spokane Stadium	Spokane, Washington	0–2		1,903	Kelsey Harms	9th
5	September 20, 2025	Dallas Trinity FC	Suncoast Credit Union Field	Tampa Bay, Florida	1–1	Giammona 68'	1,507	Gloria Resendiz	9th
6	October 4, 2025	Fort Lauderdale United FC	Suncoast Credit Union Field	Tampa Bay, Florida	0–0		1,468	Benjamin Meyer	9th
7	October 11, 2025	Brooklyn FC	Maimonides Park	Brooklyn, New York	2–2	Flint 38'; Tankersley 80'		Lauren Aldrich	9th
8	October 18, 2025	Sporting JAX	Hodges Stadium	Jacksonville, Florida	1–1	Nasello 18'	8,391	Jamie Padilla	9th
9	November 9, 2025	Spokane Zephyr FC	One Spokane Stadium	Spokane, Washington	1–0	Bessette 19'		Brad Jensen	9th
10	November 15, 2025	Fort Lauderdale United FC	Beyond Bancard Field	Fort Lauderdale, Florida	1–1	Nasello 73'pen	1,378	Marie Durr	9th
11	November 22, 2025	Lexington SC	Suncoast Credit Union Field	Tampa Bay, Florida	1–1	McNeill 14'	2,135	Danielle Chesky	9th
12	December 6, 2025	Sporting JAX	Suncoast Credit Union Field	Tampa Bay, Florida	0–3		2,231	Calin Radosav	9th
13	December 13, 2025	Brooklyn FC	Suncoast Credit Union Field	Tampa Bay, Florida	0–3		1,757	Elvis Osmanovic	9th
14	December 20, 2025	Sporting JAX	Hodges Stadium	Jacksonville, Florida	1–3	Fusco 65'	8,272	Iryna Petrunok	9th
15	January 31, 2026	Spokane Zephyr FC	Suncoast Credit Union Field	Tampa Bay, Florida	2–2	Nasello 27'; Parsons 71'	1,631	Richonne Clark	9th
16	February 14, 2026	DC Power FC	Suncoast Credit Union Field	Tampa Bay, Florida	1–1	Fusco 23'	2,050	Lauren Aldrich	9th
17	February 21, 2025	Fort Lauderdale United FC	Suncoast Credit Union Field	Tampa Bay, Florida	2–0	Nasello 12', 58' (p); Webber 83'	1,343	Natalie Simon	9th
18	March 13, 2026	Carolina Ascent FC	American Legion Memorial Stadium	Charlotte, North Carolina	0–1		2,156	Kevin Broadley	9th
19	March 18, 2026	Brooklyn FC	Suncoast Credit Union Field	Tampa Bay, Florida	0–3		2,896	Alejo Calume	9th
20	March 26, 2026	DC Power FC	Audi Field	Washington, D.C.	2–0	Webber 10'; Shimkin 62'	856	Danielle Chesky	9th
21	March 31, 2026	Dallas Trinity FC	Cotton Bowl	Dallas, Texas	2–1	McNeill 29'; Giammona 85'	2,321	Shawn Tehini	8th
22	April 5, 2026	Carolina Ascent FC	Suncoast Credit Union Field	Tampa Bay, Florida	1–2	Parsons 89'	1,482	Kaitlyn Trowbridge	8th
23	April 11, 2026	DC Power FC	Suncoast Credit Union Field	Tampa Bay, Florida	0–2		1,731	Laura Rodriguez	8th
24	April 18, 2026	Lexington SC	Lexington SC Stadium	Lexington, Kentucky	0–4		2,611	Lauren Aldrich	8th
25	April 25, 2026	Carolina Ascent FC	Suncoast Credit Union Field	Tampa Bay, Florida	1–2	Connors 87'	2,274	Jamie Padilla	ith
26	May 2, 2026	Fort Lauderdale United FC	Beyond Bancard Field	Fort Lauderdale, Florida	2–1	Webber 68' (p); Giammona 77'	3,000	John Tamayo	8th
27	May 9, 2026	Dallas Trinity FC	Suncoast Credit Union Field	Tampa Bay, Florida	0–2		2,642	Marie Durr	8th
28	May 16, 2026	Lexington SC (women)	Lexington SC Stadium	Lexington, Kentucky	0–1		5,187	Alejo Calume	8th

== Statistics ==
=== Appearances ===
As of match played May 16, 2026

Players with no appearances are not included on the list, italics indicate a loaned in player

No.	Player	Nat.	Total		Regular Season		Playoffs	
No.	Player	Nat.	Apps	Starts	Apps	Starts	Apps	Starts
Goalkeepers
1	Sydney Schneider	(Jamaica)	11	11	11	11	0	0
31	Bella Kresche	(Austria)	2	2	2	2	0	0
33	Liz Beardsley	(United States)	7	7	7	7	0	0
44	Emory Wegener	(United States)	8	8	8	8	0	0
Defenders
4	Vivianne Bessette	(Canada)	27	27	27	27	0	0
6	Sabrina McNeill	(Canada)	26	23	26	23	0	0
12	Maddie Pokorny	(United States)	11	6	11	6	0	0
15	Brooke Hendrix	(United States)	26	23	26	23	0	0
16	Siena Bryan	(United States)	11	4	12	4	0	0
20	Victoria Haugen	(Norway)	16	10	16	10	0	0
26	Taylor Chism	(United States)	14	14	14	14	0	0
37	Jordan Zade	(United States)	18	5	18	5	0	0
77	Anna Heilferty	(United States)	5	3	5	3	0	0
	Alyssa Parsons	(United States)	1	0	1	0	0	0
	Charlotte McLean	(Australia)	4	2	4	2	0	0
	Emerson Elgin	(United States)	2	1	2	1	0	0
Midfielders
3	Gabby Provenzano	(Canada)	24	14	24	14	0	0
5	Jordyn Listro	(Canada)	27	26	27	26	0	0
7	Sandrine Gaillard	(Switzerland)	25	13	25	13	0	0
11	Jilly Shimkin	(United States)	24	12	24	12	0	0
19	Carlee Giammona	(United States)	26	19	26	19	0	0
23	McKenna Batilla	(United States)	4	0	4	0	0	0
28	Jordan Fusco	(United States)	4	4	4	4	0	0
	Mackenzie Pluck	(United States)	13	12	13	12	0	0
Forwards
8	Hannah Keane	(United States)	5	2	5	2	0	0
18	Madi Parsons	(United States)	15	6	15	6	0	0
25	Peyton Parsons	(United States)	7	1	7	1	0	0
27	Farrah Walters	(United States)	1	0	1	0	0	0
35	Sydny Nasello	(United States)	28	28	28	28	0	0
39	Shea Connors	(United States)	3	2	3	2	0	0
42	Faith Webber	(United States)	14	9	14	9	0	0
	Emma Gaines-Ramos	(United States)	11	2	11	2	0	0
	Ava Tankersley	(United States)	6	5	6	5	0	0
	Natasha Flint	(England)	8	5	8	5	0	0

=== Goalscorers ===
As of May 16, 2026

Rank	No.	Nat.	Name	USLS	Playoffs	Total
1	35	(United States)	Sydny Nasello	6	0	6
2	19	(United States)	Carlee Giammona	5	0	5
3	42	(United States)	Faith Webber	3	0	3
4	6	(Canada)	Sabrina McNeill	2	0	2
4	18	(United States)	Madi Parsons	2	0	2
4	28	(United States)	Jordan Fusco	2	0	2
7
7	3	(United States)	Gabby Provenzano	1	0	1
7	4	(Canada)	Vivianne Bessette	1	0	1
7	7	(Switzerland)	Sandrine Gaillard	1	0	1
7	11	(United States)	Jilly Shimkin	1	0	1
7	39	(United States)	Shea Connors	1	0	1
7		(United States)	Ava Tankersley	1	0	1
7		(England)	Natasha Flint	1	0	1
Own goals				0	0	0
Total				27	0	27

=== Assists ===
As of May 16, 2026

Rank	No.	Nat.	Name	USLS	Playoffs	Total
1	6	(Canada)	Sabrina McNeill	4	0	4
2	35	(United States)	Sydny Nasello	3	0	3
3	11	(United States)	Jilly Shimkin	2	0	2
4	3	(Canada)	Vivianne Bessette	1	0	1
4	5	(Canada)	Jordyn Listro	1	0	1
4	42	(United States)	Faith Webber	1	0	1
4		(Switzerland)	Sandrine Gaillard	1	0	1
4		(United States)	Mackenzie Pluck	1	0	1
4		(United States)	Ava Tankersley	1	0	1
4		(United States)	Emma Gaines-Ramos	1	0	1
Total				16	0	16

=== Clean sheets ===
As of May 16, 2026

Rank	No.	Nat.	Name	USLS	Playoffs	Total
1	1	(Jamaica)	Sydney Schneider	2	0	2
1	44	(United States)	Emory Wegener	2	0	2
Total				4	0	4

=== Disciplinary record ===
As of May 16, 2026

Player			Regular Season			Playoffs			Total		
No.	Nat.	Name	Booked	(yellow card) (yellow-red card)	Sent off (straight red)	Booked	(yellow card) (yellow-red card)	Sent off (straight red)	Booked	(yellow card) (yellow-red card)	Sent off (straight red)
3	(United States)	Gabby Provenzano	1	0	0	0	0	0	1	0	0
4	(Canada)	Vivianne Bessette	5	0	0	0	0	0	5	0	0
5	(Canada)	Jordyn Listro	9	0	0	0	0	0	9	0	0
6	(Canada)	Sabrina McNeill	1	0	0	0	0	0	1	0	0
7	(Switzerland)	Sandrine Gaillard	5	0	0	0	0	0	5	0	0
11	(United States)	Jilly Shimkin	1	0	1	0	0	0	1	0	1
12	(United States)	Maddie Pokorny	3	0	0	0	0	0	3	0	0
15	(United States)	Brooke Hendrix	5	0	0	0	0	0	5	0	0
16	(United States)	Siena Bryan	2	0	0	0	0	0	2	0	0
19	(United States)	Carlee Giammona	2	0	0	0	0	0	2	0	0
20	(Norway)	Victoria Haugen	4	0	0	0	0	0	4	0	0
23	(United States)	Parker Goins	1	0	0	0	0	0	1	0	0
26	(United States)	Taylor Chism	2	0	0	0	0	0	2	0	0
28	(United States)	Jordan Fusco	1	0	0	0	0	0	1	0	0
33	(United States)	Liz Beardsley	1	0	0	0	0	0	1	0	0
35	(United States)	Sydny Nasello	5	0	0	0	0	0	5	0	0
37	(United States)	Jordan Zade	1	0	0	0	0	0	1	0	0
39	(United States)	Shea Connors	1	0	0	0	0	0	1	0	0
77	(United States)	Anna Heilferty	1	0	0	0	0	0	1	0	0
	(United States)	Mackenzie Pluck	1	0	0	0	0	0	1	0	0
	(United States)	Emerson Elgin	1	0	0	0	0	0	1	0	0
	(United States)	Ava Tankersley	1	0	0	0	0	0	1	0	0
	(England)	Natasha Flint	4	0	0	0	0	0	4	0	0
Total			54	0	1	0	0	0	54	0	1

== Awards and honors ==
=== USL Super League All League Team ===
Player	Position	Ref
(United States) Sydny Nasello	FW	

=== USL Super League Team of the Month ===
Month	Player	Position	Ref
September	(United States) Sydny Nasello	Bench	
October	(United States) Sydny Nasello (2)	MF	
November	(Canada) Sabrina McNeill	DF	
November	(Canada) Vivianne Bessette	Bench	
November	(Jamaica) Sydney Schneider	Bench	
February	(United States) Sydny Nasello (3)	FW	
February	(Canada) Sabrina McNeill (2)	Bench	
March	(United States) Faith Webber	FW	
March	(United States) Taylor Chism	DF	

=== USL Super League Save of the Month ===
Month	Player	Ref
April	(United States) Liz Beardsley	
