= Isabella Kresche =

Austrian footballer

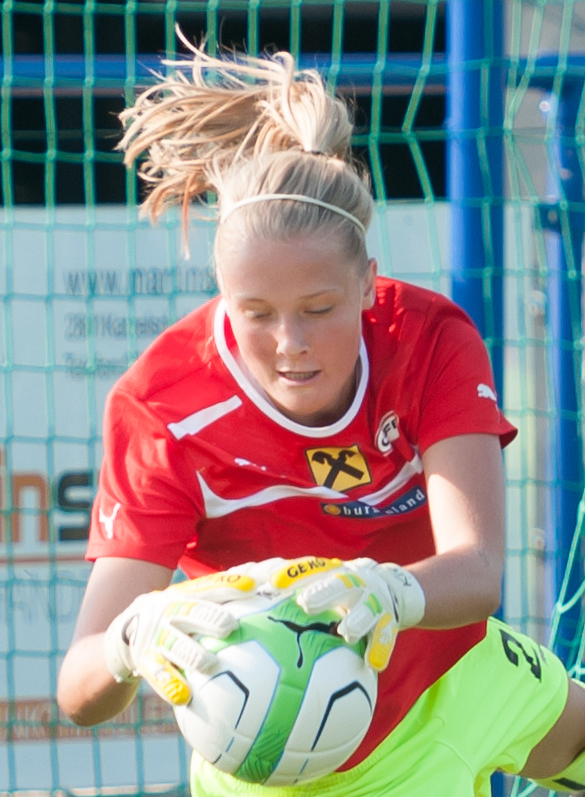
- Kresche with Austria U19 in 2015

Personal information
- Date of birth: 28 November 1998 (age 27)
- Place of birth: Graz, Austria
- Height: 1.83 m (6 ft 0 in)
- Position: Goalkeeper

Senior career*
Years	Team	Apps	(Gls)
2014–2015	SV Neulengbach	2	(0)
2015–2016	LUV Graz Damen	17	(0)
2016–2022	SKN St. Pölten	34	(0)
2022–2024	Sassuolo	20	(0)
2024–2025	AS Roma	8	(0)
2025–2026	Tampa Bay Sun	2	(0)
Total		83	(0)

International career^{‡}
2013–2015	Austria U17	6	(0)
2015–2016	Austria U19	3	(0)
2022–2023	Austria	6	(0)
- * Club domestic league appearances and goals as of 17:22, 2 July 2026 (UTC) ‡ National team caps and goals as of 17:22, 2 July 2026 (UTC)

Isabella Kresche (born 28 November 1998) is an Austrian former professional footballer who played as a goalkeeper. She started her career domestically with SV Neulengbach, LUV Graz Damen, and SKN St. Pölten before joining Italian Serie A clubs Sassuolo and AS Roma. She finished her career in the United States with USL Super League club Tampa Bay Sun FC. Kresche also played for the Austria national team, earning six caps and participating in the UEFA Euro 2022.

== Early life ==
Kresche was born in Graz in 1998. She began learning about goalkeeping at Roland Goriupp's camps, and then at the National Center for Women's Football, where she learned from former goalkeeper Reinhard Dietl. After graduating from high school in 2017, she studied business administration at the Vienna University of Economics and Business and graduated with a bachelor's degree.

== Club career ==
Kresche came through the ranks at SV Neulengbach in her teens, and spent a season at LUV Graz Damen before making her name domestically at SKN St. Pölten, playing there for six years from 2016 to 2022, competing in the UEFA Women's Champions League each season there.

She was brought to Italy by Serie A Femminile club Sassuolo in 2022, and made an instant impact, saving two penalties against Parma in a 1–0 away win in March 2023. However, she saw her first season there finish early due to a shoulder injury.

Kresche spent two seasons at Sassuolo, finishing sixth in 2023 and fourth in 2024, before moving the capital to join champions AS Roma in September 2024.

In July 2025, Tampa Bay Sun FC announced they had signed Kresche for the 2025-26 USL Super League season. Kresche made 2 appearances for Tampa Bay as Liz Beardsley, Emory Wegener, and Sydney Schneider took up the majority of minutes in goal. On 12 June 2026, the Sun announced that Kresche would not be returning for a second season.

In July 2026, Kresche announced her retirement from professional football.

== International career ==
Kresche was first called up to the senior Austrian national team in 2022, making her debut in a friendly match against Romania in February where the team won 6–1. She was named in the squad for UEFA Euro 2022 by coach Irene Fuhrmann, as third goalkeeper behind Manuela Zinsberger and Jasmin Pal.

With Zinsberger as first-choice, Kresche was a non-playing substitute for all four games at the tournament as Austria went out in the quarter-finals to Germany.
