= Emma Gaines-Ramos =

American soccer player (born 2002)

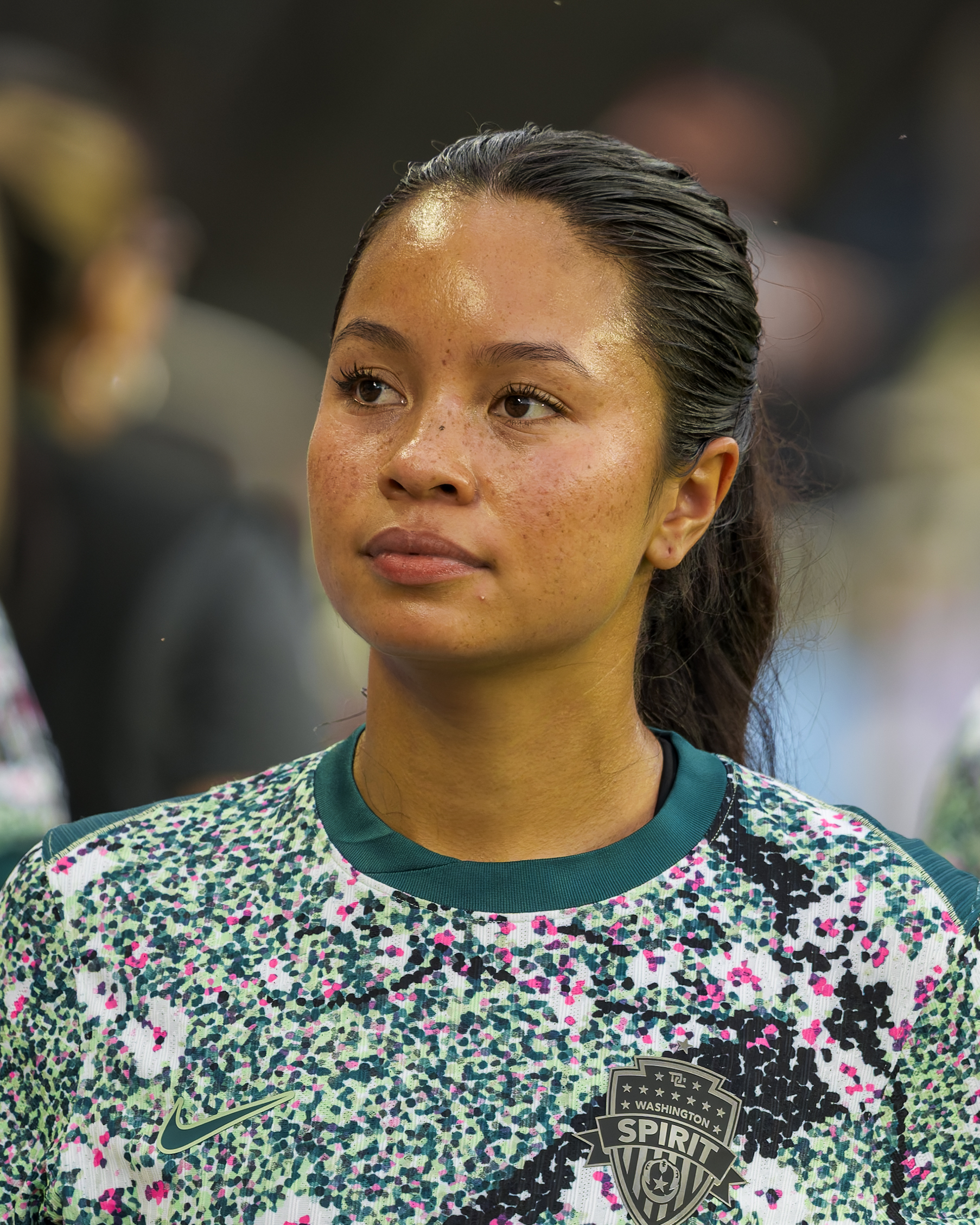
- Gaines-Ramos with the Washington Spirit in 2026

Personal information
- Full name: Emma Shaye Gaines-Ramos
- Date of birth: March 18, 2002 (age 24)
- Height: 5 ft 7 in (1.70 m)
- Position: Forward

Team information
- Current team: Washington Spirit
- Number: 29

Youth career
- Rebels SC
- 2017–2020: Otay Ranch Mustangs

College career
Years	Team	Apps	(Gls)
2021–2024	San Diego State Aztecs	91	(19)

Senior career*
Years	Team	Apps	(Gls)
2023	San Diego Surf		
2025–	Washington Spirit	0	(0)
2025	→ Tampa Bay Sun (loan)	11	(0)
- * Club domestic league appearances and goals as of 01:11, December 22, 2025 (UTC)

Emma Shaye Gaines-Ramos (born March 18, 2002) is an American professional soccer player who plays as a forward for the Washington Spirit of the National Women's Soccer League (NWSL). She played college soccer for the San Diego State Aztecs.

== Early life ==
Gaines-Ramos grew up in Chula Vista, California, and attended Otay Ranch High School, where she competed on the soccer and track teams. She helped the soccer team to the CIF Southern Section Division III title game as a freshman in 2017 before leading the team to its first Division III title victory as a senior in 2020. She played club soccer for Rebels SC, where she won the USYS national under-18 championship in 2018, providing the winning assist in stoppage time of the 1–0 final victory.

== College career ==
Gaines-Ramos played five seasons for the San Diego State Aztecs, scoring 19 goals and providing 25 assists in 91 appearances. Her shortened freshman season took place in the spring of 2021 due to the COVID-19 pandemic. In her senior year in 2023, she helped lead the Aztecs to the Mountain West Conference regular-season title. She received All-Mountain West recognition four times, including first-team all-conference selections in 2020 and 2022.

== Club career ==
National Women's Soccer League club Washington Spirit announced on January 6, 2025, that they had signed Gaines-Ramos to her first professional contract on a two-year deal with options to extend an additional two years. After starting the season on the season-ending injury list with a knee injury, she was taken off the injury list on July 23 and immediately loaned to USL Super League club Tampa Bay Sun for the 2025–26 season. She made her professional debut as a second-half substitute for Victoria Haugen in the Sun's season-opening 2–1 loss to Brooklyn FC on August 23.

On January 21, 2026, after making 11 appearances on loan in Tampa Bay, Gaines-Ramos was recalled for preseason with her parent club.

== Honors and awards ==
San Diego State Aztecs

- Mountain West Conference: 2023

Individual

- First-team All-Mountain West: 2020, 2022
- Second-team All-Mountain West: 2023, 2024
