= Jackie Simpson (soccer) =

American soccer player (born 1994)

Personal information
- Full name: Jacqueline Simpson
- Date of birth: October 14, 1994 (age 32)
- Place of birth: Lithia, Florida, U.S.
- Position: Defender

Youth career
- West Florida Flames

College career
Years	Team	Apps	(Gls)
2012–2015	South Florida Bulls	78	(8)

Senior career*
Years	Team	Apps	(Gls)
2016–2019	UDG Tenerife		
2019	Glentoran		
2019–2020	Sparta Prague		
2020–2021	UDG Tenerife	23	(0)
2025	Tampa Bay Sun	6	(0)
- * Club domestic league appearances and goals as of June 30, 2025

Jackie Simpson (born October 14, 1994) is an American soccer player.

== College career ==
Simpson played four years of college soccer for the University of South Florida, where she played mostly as a center back. Simpson was named to the All-American Athletic Conference Second Team in her junior season, and in her senior year was named the Conference Defensive Player of the Year.

== Club career ==
In early 2016, Simpson was a part of the first-ever preseason roster for the Orlando Pride in the National Women's Soccer League, but ultimately did not sign with the club.

In September 2016, Simpson signed her first professional contract with Spanish club UD Tenerife. Simpson renewed her contract with the club in May 2017.

Simpson signed with Glentoran W.F.C. in June 2019.

After a season spent with Sparta Prague, Simpson returned to Tenerife in May 2020.

Simpson joined the first-team roster of USL Super League club Tampa Bay Sun on February 5, 2025, after having trained with the team during the first half of their season. The move reunites her with former South Florida Bulls teammate Jordyn Listro, and coach Denise Schilte-Brown. Simpson suffered an ACL tear on April 6, 2025, during a match against Fort Lauderdalel United.

== Honors ==
Tampa Bay Sun

- USL Super League: 2024–25
