= Millie Ravening =

English footballer (born 2001)

Personal information
- Full name: Millie Grace Ravening
- Date of birth: 23 October 2001 (age 25)
- Positions: Forward; midfielder

Team information
- Current team: Tampa Bay Sun
- Number: 23

Youth career
- Manchester United
- Manchester City

Senior career*
Years	Team	Apps	(Gls)
2021–2024	Burnley	66	(39)
2024–2025	Stoke City	22	(14)
2025–2026	Burnley	22	(19)
2026–	Tampa Bay Sun	0	(0)
- * Club domestic league appearances and goals as of 13:47, 17 August 2026 (UTC)

Millie Grace Ravening (born 23 October 2001) is an English professional footballer who plays as a forward or midfielder for USL Super League club Tampa Bay Sun FC. She has previously been a member of FA Women's National League clubs Burnley and Stoke City, helping Burnley win the FA Women's National League North title in 2026.

== Youth career ==
Ravening started playing football for the boys team of local club Chadderton End. At the age of 7, she was scouted by Manchester United and spent the next six years in United's academy. However, with Manchester United lacking a development squad, Ravening later chose to switch clubs; she then spent the remaining five years of her youth career with cross-town rivals Manchester City.

== Club career ==
Ahead of the 2021–22 FA Women's National League season, Ravening signed for Burnley. She helped the team reach a fourth-place finish in her first season and scored 17 total goals. One of her goals came in Burnley's county title match victory. The following year, Ravening was the FA WNL North's joint top goalscorer, netting 30 times over 31 games. She also was promoted to the role of Burnley's vice-captain and was named Player of the Season. In her third season at Burnley, Ravening had a slight dip from her heights the previous year, ultimately netting 14 goals across the campaign. She finished her first stint with the club having scored 60 goals.

On 3 August 2024, Ravening was announced to have signed for Stoke City. In her sole season with Stoke City, she registered 26 goals in 31 appearances across all competitions. One of Ravening's goals was a long-range free-kick conversion in Stoke City's 1–0 win over her former club, Burnley, in the FA Women's National League Cup quarterfinals.

Ravening returned to Burnley in August 2025. She continued to find offensive success, finding the back of the net in both league and cup competitions to win the FA WNL North's joint Golden Boot award for the second time in her career. In November 2025, she recorded a brace against her former side, Stoke City, in a 2–1 Burnley victory. Later that month, she scored her 68th goal in her 100th Burnley appearance in a victory against Derby County. In the final match of the season, Ravening scored twice in a 3–0 win, once again versus Stoke City, to help Burnley finish the season atop the table with a one-point advantage over runners-up Wolverhampton Wanderers. The first-place finish following an undefeated season earned Burnley promotion to the Women's Super League 2 for the first time in history. Ravening was offered a new Burnley contract at the end of the season, but she opted not to return.

American club Tampa Bay Sun FC announced on 8 August 2026 that they had signed Ravening ahead of the team's third season in the USL Super League.

== Personal life ==
Ravening is a native of Middleton, Greater Manchester. While playing for Stoke City, she also worked as a full-time PE teacher.

== Honours ==
Burnley

- FA Women's National League North: 2025–26
