= Alexis Theoret =

American soccer player (born 2002)

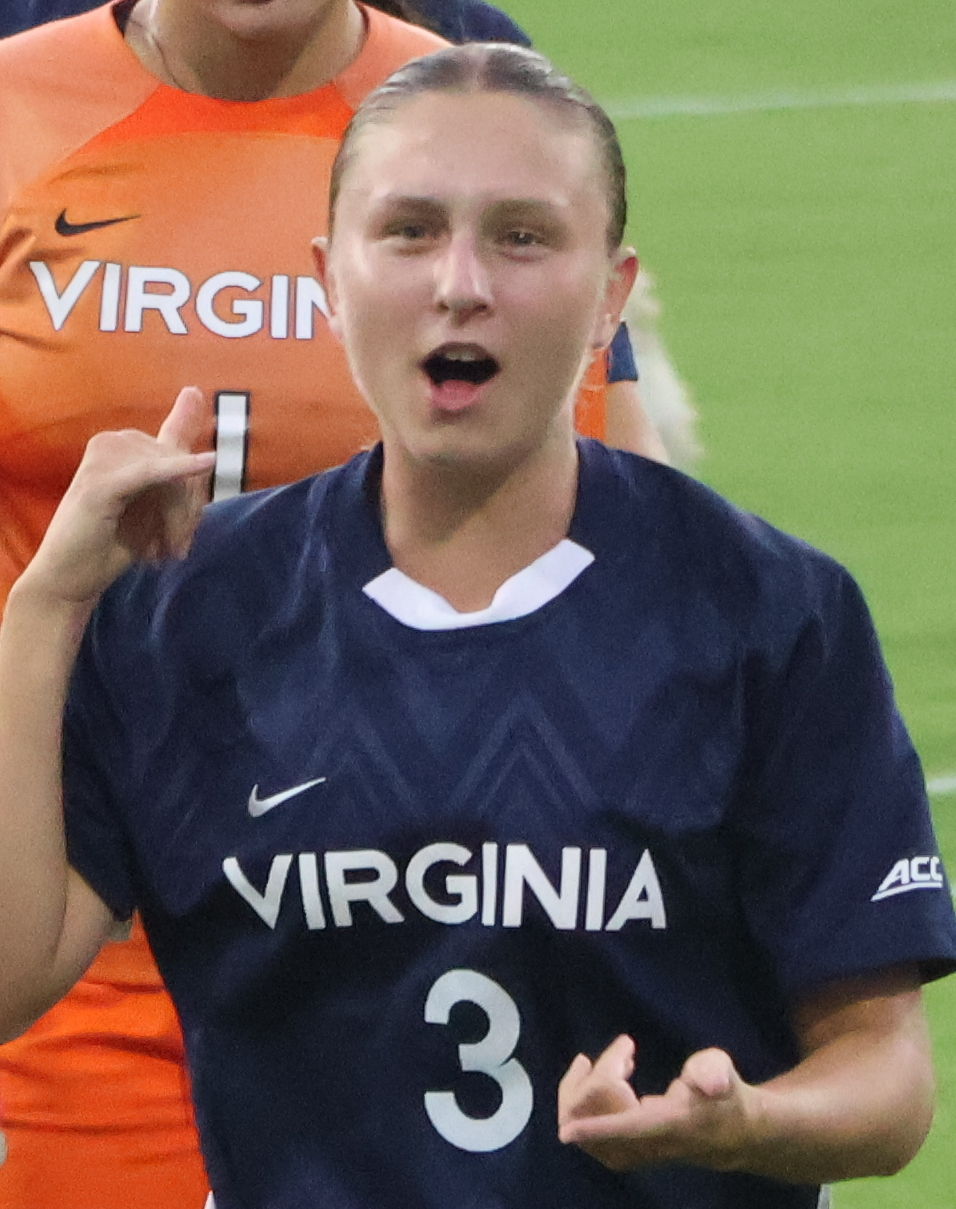
- Theoret with Virginia in 2024

Personal information
- Full name: Alexis Jordan Theoret
- Date of birth: April 4, 2002 (age 24)
- Place of birth: Haymarket, Virginia, U.S.
- Height: 5 ft 4 in (1.63 m)
- Position: Midfielder

Team information
- Current team: Tampa Bay Sun
- Number: 14

Youth career
- FC Virginia Developmental Academy
- 2016–2020: Oakton Cougars

College career
Years	Team	Apps	(Gls)
2020–2024	Virginia Cavaliers	91	(4)

Senior career*
Years	Team	Apps	(Gls)
2025–2026	DC Power FC	22	(0)
2026–	Tampa Bay Sun	2	(0)

International career
2018	United States U16		
2018–2019	United States U18		
2023	United States U23	2	(0)
- * Club domestic league appearances and goals as of 22:08, September 27, 2026 (UTC)

Alexis Jordan Theoret (born April 4, 2002) is an American professional soccer player who plays as a midfielder for USL Super League club Tampa Bay Sun FC. She played college soccer for the Virginia Cavaliers before joining DC Power FC.

== Early life ==
Theoret was born on April 4, 2002 in Haymarket, Virginia. She attended Oakton High School in Vienna, Virginia, and was active academically, earning membership in the National Honor Society and National Society of High School Scholars. She developed as a youth player with the FC Virginia Development Academy in Woodbridge, Virginia. During her youth career, she earned recognition in regional and national youth competitions, including selection to The Washington Post All-Met second team in 2017.

== College career ==
Theoret played soccer for the University of Virginia from 2020 to 2024. As a freshman, she appeared in all 16 matches, making her debut in the Cavaliers’ home opener on September 12 against the Virginia Tech Hokies. During her sophomore season in 2021–22, she scored two goals and recorded three assists across 23 appearances.

In 2022–23, Theoret scored a goal in a 2–0 victory over the Louisville Cardinals on September 25, 2022. As a junior in 2023–24, she made 17 starts, contributing three assists. Prior to her senior season in 2024, Theoret was named team captain. She appeared in 12 matches, before another injury curtailed her season.

== Club career ==
On June 19, 2025, Theoret signed with DC Power FC ahead of the 2025–26 USL Super League season. She made her professional debut in the season-opening match on August 30 against Spokane Zephyr FC, registering her first assist in the 2–2 draw. Theoret went on to total 22 appearances for DC as the team failed to qualify for the playoffs for the second year in a row. In June 2026, Power FC opted to decline Theoret's contract option, releasing her after one season.

Fellow USL Super League club Tampa Bay Sun FC announced the signing of Theoret on July 3, 2026.

== International career ==
Theoret appeared for the United States U-16 team in 2018 and subsequently played for the United States U-18 team. She played with the United States U-23 team team in two fixtures with one start.

== Personal life ==
She is the daughter of Todd and Rhonda Theoret and has four older siblings. Her older sisters, Lauren and Cortlyn, played collegiate soccer at the University of Mary Washington and College of William & Mary, respectively.

== Honors and awards ==
Individual

- USL Super League Team of the Month: September 2025, October 2025
