= Samar Guidry =

American professional soccer player

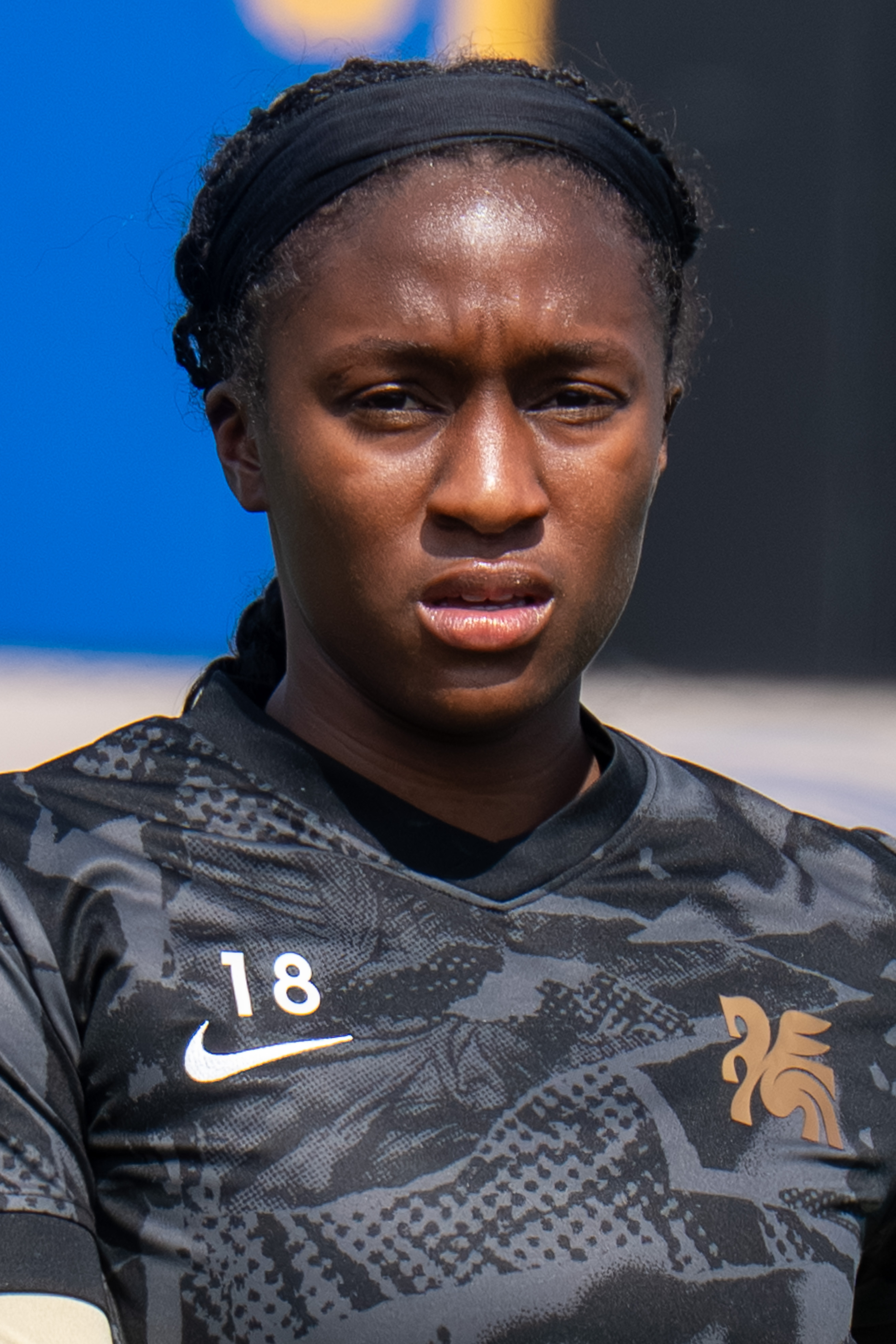
- Guidry with the Dallas Trinity in 2026

Personal information
- Full name: Samar Anise Guidry
- Date of birth: January 18, 2002 (age 24)
- Place of birth: McKinney, Texas, United States
- Height: 5 ft 4 in (1.63 m)
- Position: Defender

Team information
- Current team: Tampa Bay Sun
- Number: 27

Youth career
- 2016–2020: FC Dallas

College career
Years	Team	Apps	(Gls)
2020–2024	Virginia Cavaliers	96	(2)

Senior career*
Years	Team	Apps	(Gls)
2025–2026	Dallas Trinity	25	(1)
2026–	Tampa Bay Sun	7	(0)

International career^{‡}
2018	United States U17	2	(0)
2019–2022	United States U20	13	(0)
2020	United States U19	2	(0)
- * Club domestic league appearances and goals as of 00:49, November 7, 2026 (UTC) ‡ National team caps and goals as of 05:11, March 31, 2026 (UTC)

Samar Anise Guidry (born January 18, 2002) is an American professional soccer player who plays as a defender for USL Super League club Tampa Bay Sun FC. She played college soccer for the Virginia Cavaliers, earning All-ACC second team honors in 2021. She has previously been a member of Dallas Trinity FC.

== Early life ==
Guidry was born and raised in McKinney, Texas, where she attended McKinney Boyd High School. She developed her soccer through the FC Dallas Girls Academy from 2017 to 2020, earning multiple youth national team call-ups during her time in the academy. In 2019, she was recognized as a high school All-American.

== College career ==
Guidry enrolled at the University of Virginia in 2020 and played for the Virginia Cavaliers from the 2020–21 season onward. In her freshman season, she started all 19 matches she played, logging 1,516 minutes, and was named to the Freshman All-ACC team. She also tallied two assists, including one on a game-winning goal at No. 12 West Virginia and one on a game-winning goal against Milwaukee in the NCAA second-round.

In her sophomore season of 2021, Guidry was named to the All-ACC second team, playing 21 games with 18 starts and logging 1,232 minutes en route to the Cavaliers' third ACC regular-season title in program history. She contributed a goal and three assists, including an assist on the game-winning goal at No. 3 Florida State that helped secure the ACC regular-season title, and assisted on a game-winning goal vs. Milwaukee in the NCAA Tournament second round. In 2022, she started all 20 matches, logging 1,239 minutes, and recorded two assists — both against Oregon State. Her junior and senior seasons also saw her named to the ACC Women's Soccer All-Academic Team and ACC Academic Honor Roll.

Across her collegiate career at Virginia, Guidry played over 60 games and was a consistent presence on the back line, helping the Cavaliers post 13 shutouts in the 2022 season alone.

== Club career ==
=== Dallas Trinity ===
Following her five-year collegiate career at Virginia, Guidry signed with Dallas Trinity FC ahead of the 2025–26 Gainbridge Super League season. A local product from the Dallas–Fort Worth area, she was part of a deliberate effort by the club to strengthen its defensive unit heading into its second season. Guidry primarily plays as a left back, though she also featured at right back during preseason. She made her professional debut on August 23, 2025, earning the start in a season-opening victory over the Spokane Zephyr. On September 26, Guidry received her first career red card, getting sent off in the 58th minute of an eventual 6–1 loss to Lexington SC. She went on to total 25 league appearances in her lone season with Dallas, helping the Trinity qualify for the playoffs for the second consecutive season. On June 4, 2026, Dallas announced Guidry's departure from the club.

=== Tampa Bay Sun ===
On September 1, 2026, Guidry was announced to have joined Tampa Bay Sun FC on a one-year contract with a club option.

== International career ==
Guidry represented the United States at the U-17 level. Guidry was named to the squad that competed at the 2018 FIFA U-17 Women's World Cup in Uruguay, but did not make any appearances in the tournament. She also received U-16 national team camp call-ups in 2018 and earned multiple call-ups to the U-20 national team, including for the 2022 CONCACAF U-20 Championship.

== Honors ==
Virginia Cavaliers

- Atlantic Coast Conference: 2021

Individual

- Freshman All-ACC Team: 2020
- All-ACC Second Team: 2021
- United Soccer Coaches Youth Girls All-America: 2019
- United Soccer Coaches Youth Girls All-Central Region: 2018
