= Peyton Parsons =

American soccer player (born 2003)

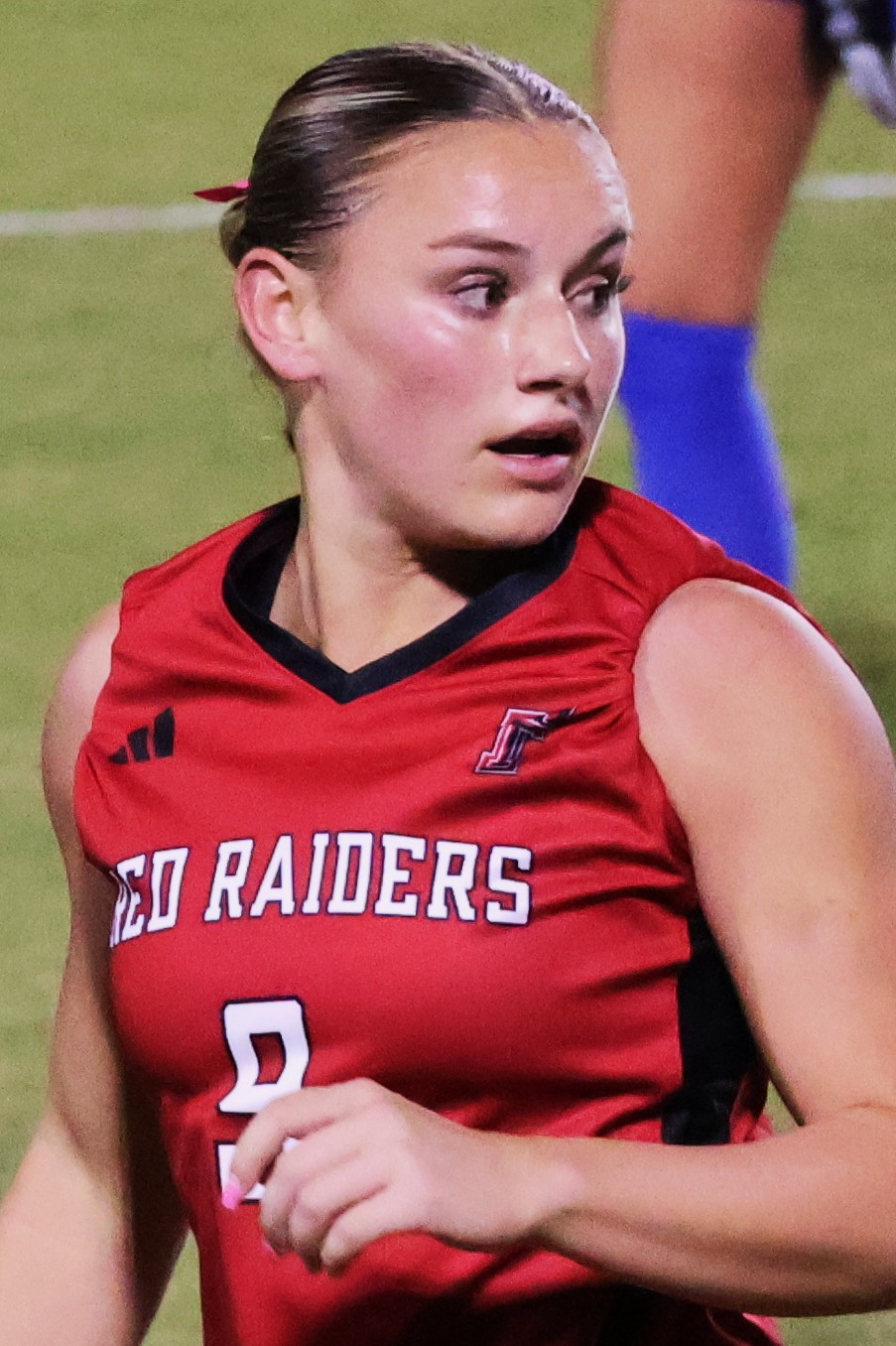
- Parsons with Texas Tech in 2024

Personal information
- Full name: Peyton Brady Parsons
- Date of birth: December 6, 2003 (age 22)
- Height: 5 ft 4 in (1.63 m)
- Positions: Forward; midfielder

Youth career
- Real Colorado

College career
Years	Team	Apps	(Gls)
2022–2025	Texas Tech Red Raiders	83	(17)

Senior career*
Years	Team	Apps	(Gls)
2026	Tampa Bay Sun	7	(0)
2026	Houston Dash	0	(0)
- * Club domestic league appearances and goals as of 03:45, May 18, 2026 (UTC)

Peyton Brady Parsons (born December 6, 2003) is an American professional soccer player who plays as a forward or midfielder. She played college soccer for the Texas Tech Red Raiders before starting her professional career with USL Super League club Tampa Bay Sun FC and the Houston Dash of the National Women's Soccer League (NWSL).

== Early life ==
Parsons grew up in Denver, Colorado. She played club soccer for Elite Clubs National League team Real Colorado, winning one ECNL first-team all-conference honor. She attended Valor Christian High School, where she was named first-team all-state and all-conference after making key offensive contributions throughout her high school career.

== College career ==
As a freshman for the Texas Tech Red Raiders, Parsons started in 8 of her 19 appearances. She scored her first collegiate goal on September 8, 2022, opening a 3–0 victory over Houston. The following year, she came on as a substitute in all of the Red Raiders' matches, racking up 21 appearances from the bench. She contributed 2 assists as Texas Tech finished as 2023 Big 12 regular season champions and advanced to the NCAA tournament. In the Red Raiders' NCAA second round match against Princeton, Parsons converted the deciding spot-kick as Texas Tech advanced on penalties.

In 2024, Parsons stepped up as a team leader following multiple teammate injuries and graduations. Over the next two seasons, she would go on to start 43 straight games to round out her college career. As a junior, she scored 9 goals, 7 of which came in the opening 6 matches of the season. In September 2025, she was named the Big 12 Conference Offensive Player of the Week and earned a spot on the TopDrawerSoccer Team of the Week. At the end of the season, she was named first-team All-Big 12. As a senior in 2025, Parsons recorded 7 goals and 6 assists. She was named to the All-Big 12 first team for the second year in a row. In the NCAA tournament, she scored and assisted in Texas Tech's first-round win over UTSA, and then registered an assist in the Red Raiders' second-round loss to reigning titleholders North Carolina.

== Club career ==
In the 2026 NWSL preseason, Parsons joined Seattle Reign FC for a trial stint. She was ultimately not signed by the club.

On March 16, 2026, USL Super League club Tampa Bay Sun FC announced that they had signed Parsons to her first professional contract, through the end of the Super League season. Parsons made her pro debut two days later, coming on as a halftime substitute for Jilly Shimkin in a 3–0 defeat to Brooklyn FC. She departed from Tampa Bay at the end of season after having made 7 appearances for the Sun.

In September 2026, Parsons joined the Houston Dash of the NWSL on a short-term deal. She did not make any appearances for the Dash during her brief stint.

== Honors and awards ==
Texas Tech Red Raiders

- Big 12 Conference: 2023

Individual

- First-team All-Big 12: 2024, 2025
