= Reagan Raabe =

American soccer player (born 2001)

Personal information
- Full name: Reagan Grace Raabe
- Date of birth: September 27, 2001 (age 25)
- Height: 5 ft 5 in (1.65 m)
- Position: Winger

Team information
- Current team: Tampa Bay Sun
- Number: 8

Youth career
- Elite Girls Academy
- 2017–2019: Millard West Wildcats

College career
Years	Team	Apps	(Gls)
2020–2025	Nebraska Cornhuskers	61	(14)

Senior career*
Years	Team	Apps	(Gls)
2026	Orlando Pride	2	(0)
2026–	Tampa Bay Sun	3	(0)
- * Club domestic league appearances and goals as of 00:27, November 7, 2026 (UTC)

Reagan Grace Raabe (born September 27, 2001) is an American professional soccer player who plays as a winger for USL Super League club Tampa Bay Sun FC. She played college soccer for the Nebraska Cornhuskers before starting her professional career with the Orlando Pride of the National Women's Soccer League (NWSL).

== Early life ==
Raabe grew up in Omaha, Nebraska, one of three daughters born to Chris and Melanie Raabe. She played high school soccer at Millard West High School. During her sophomore year, she tore the anterior cruciate ligament (ACL) in her right knee. Despite the injury, she committed that year to play college soccer for the Nebraska Cornhuskers. She then captained Millard West to the NSAA Class A state championship in her junior year in 2019, scoring 21 goals and tallying 11 assists, and was named the Nebraska Gatorade Player of the Year. She played ECNL club soccer for Elite Girls Academy.

== College career ==
Raabe enrolled at the University of Nebraska–Lincoln in the spring of 2020. She played and started in 8 games and scored 1 goal as a freshman in the spring of 2021. She started all 18 games as a sophomore in the fall of 2021, leading the team with 7 goals and adding 3 assists, and earned third-team All-Big Ten honors. In her junior year in 2022, she started 17 games and scored 2 goals with 4 assists, being named third-team All-Big Ten for the second time. Shortly before the Big Ten tournament, she tore her medial collateral ligament (MCL) and missed the rest of the season.

In the spring of 2023, Raabe tore the ACL in her right knee during a preseason match and missed what would have been her senior season. Without her, the Huskers won the Big Ten regular-season title and reached the NCAA tournament quarterfinals. In the spring of 2024, she tore the ACL in her left knee less than ten minutes into her return in a preseason match, forcing her to miss a second consecutive season. She considered retiring from soccer after her third ACL injury before deciding to return for her sixth and final season in 2025. That year, she started all 18 games and scored 4 goals while leading the team with 6 assists.

== Club career ==
After attending the NWSL Combine in December 2025, Raabe joined the Orlando Pride as a non-roster trialist in the 2026 preseason. On March 5, the Pride announced that they had signed Raabe to her first professional contract on a short-term deal through June. She made her professional debut later that month as a substitute in the season opener, a 2–1 defeat to the Seattle Reign. She appeared for the Pride once more before departing from Orlando upon the expiration of her rookie contract.

On August 8, 2026, Raabe was announced to have signed for USL Super League club Tampa Bay Sun FC.

== Honors and awards ==
Nebraska Cornhuskers

- Big Ten Conference: 2023

Individual

- Third-team All-Big Ten: 2021, 2022
