= Jordan Zade =

American soccer player (born 2003)

Personal information
- Date of birth: January 18, 2003 (age 23)
- Height: 5 ft 7 in (1.70 m)
- Positions: Defender; winger

Team information
- Current team: Tampa Bay Sun
- Number: 37

Youth career
- KC Fusion Academy

College career
Years	Team	Apps	(Gls)
2021–2024	Nebraska Cornhuskers	74	(1)

Senior career*
Years	Team	Apps	(Gls)
2025–	Tampa Bay Sun	41	(1)
- * Club domestic league appearances and goals as of 00:53, November 7, 2026 (UTC)

Jordan Zade (born January 18, 2003) is an American professional soccer player who plays as a defender or winger for Tampa Bay Sun FC of the USL Super League. She played college soccer for the Nebraska Cornhuskers.

== Early life ==
Zade is a native of Olathe, Kansas. She grew up playing soccer with the KC Fusion Academy, captaining the team for four years and contributing to one NPL Central States Championship. Zade also did gymnastics competitively for seven years. She attended De Soto High School, where she was a four-year starter on the soccer team. During her high school career, Zade helped the team reach a Frontier League Championship and individually won spots on two All-Conference first teams and one All-State second team.

== College career ==
In August 2019, Zade verbally committed to the University of Nebraska–Lincoln. She began playing with the Cornhuskers in 2021, making 18 appearances (11 starts) as a freshman. She scored her first (and only) college goal on September 5, 2021, netting the final tally in a 3–0 win over Loyola Chicago.

Over the next two years, Zade was a mainstay on the Cornhuskers' backline, starting all of Nebraska's matches in that timeframe. She received several accolades in her junior season, including places on the All-Region Third Team and All-Big Ten Second Team. That year, she also helped the Cornhuskers' defense record 7 shutouts along the way to a Big Ten regular season title and third-ever Elite 8 trip. Zade was named a Big 12 preseason player to watch ahead of her senior season, but she was sidelined with an injury after 12 matches. Despite missing time due to her injury, Zade was able to amass 74 appearances and over 5000 total minutes of action across her four seasons of college.

== Club career ==
On January 8, 2025, Zade signed her first professional contract with Tampa Bay Sun FC through the remainder of the team's inaugural season in the USL Super League. She made her club debut on February 8, 2025, in a 2–2 draw with Floridian rivals Fort Lauderdale United FC. She made 14 regular season appearances and came on as a sub in both of Tampa Bay's playoff games as the Sun won the inaugural Super League title.

The following year, Zade continued to appear for Tampa Bay largely as a substitute; she made 5 starts in her 18 appearances across the season. She recorded her first professional goal contribution on October 19, 2025, assisting Ava Tankersley in a 2–2 draw with Brooklyn FC. The Sun finished their second season of play in a less successful fashion, finishing second-to-last in the standings and failing to qualify for the playoffs.

== Style of play ==
Zade is capable of executing flip throws on throw-ins. She developed the skill in high school and cultivated it further as a college player at the University of Nebraska. Zade cites her background in competitive gymnastics as an experience that has developed her style of throw-ins.

== Career statistics ==
=== Club ===
As of November 1, 2026

Appearances and goals by club, season, and competition
Club	Season	League			Cup		Playoffs		Total	
Club	Season	Division	Apps	Goals	Apps	Goals	Apps	Goals	Apps	Goals
Tampa Bay Sun FC	2024–25	USL Super League	16	0	—		2	0	18	0
Tampa Bay Sun FC	2025–26	USL Super League	18	0	—		0	0	18	0
Tampa Bay Sun FC	2026	USL Super League	9	1	—		0	0	9	1
Career total			43	1	0	0	2	0	45	1

== Honors and awards ==
Nebraska Cornhuskers

- Big Ten Conference: 2023

Tampa Bay Sun

- USL Super League: 2024–25

Individual

- Second-team All-Big Ten: 2023
