= Denise Schilte-Brown =

Canadian soccer coach (born 1974)

Personal information
- Date of birth: 14 February 1974 (age 52)
- Place of birth: Halifax, Nova Scotia, Canada

Managerial career
- Years: Team
- 1997: Eckerd Tritons (assistant)
- 1998: Tampa Spartans (assistant)
- 1998–1999: UMBC Retrievers
- 2000–2006: VCU Rams
- 2007–2023: South Florida Bulls
- 2024–: Tampa Bay Sun

Denise Schilte-Brown (née Schilte; born 14 February 1974) is a Canadian soccer coach and former player who manages Tampa Bay Sun FC in the USL Super League.

== Managerial career ==
In 1998, Schilte-Brown was appointed head coach of the women's soccer team of American university University of Maryland, Baltimore County, the UMBC Retrievers. Two years later, she was appointed head coach of the women's soccer team of American university Virginia Commonwealth University, the VCU Rams.

Following her stint there, she was appointed head coach of the women's soccer team of American university University of South Florida, the South Florida Bulls, helping the team reach the third round of the 2019 NCAA Division I women's soccer tournament. Ahead of the 2024–25 season, she was appointed head coach of American side Tampa Bay Sun FC, helping the club win the inaugural USL Super League championship.

== Personal life ==
Schilte-Brown was born on 4 January 1978 in Halifax, Nova Scotia, Canada and is a native of the city. The mother of Canada youth international Ethan Schilte-Brown and Kenza Brown, she has been married to American soccer player and coach Chris Brown.
