= Liz Beardsley =

American soccer player (born 2003)

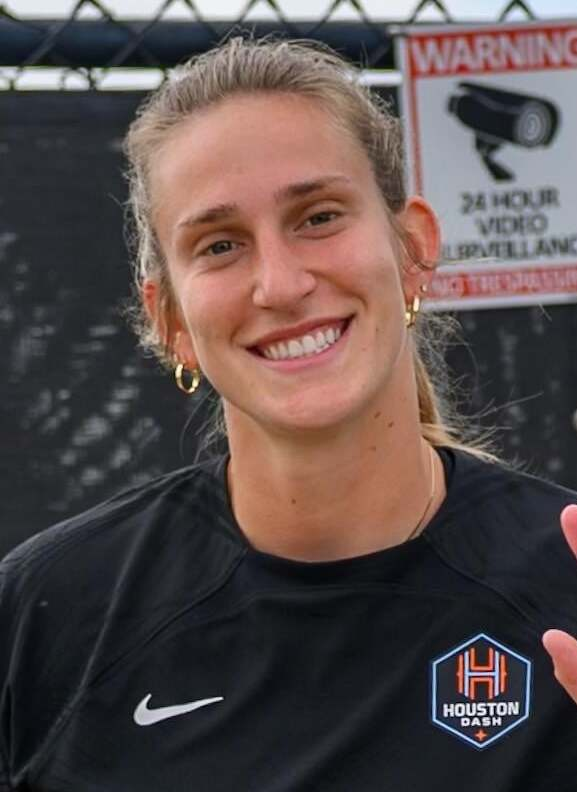
- Beardsley with the Houston Dash in 2025

Personal information
- Full name: Elizabeth Kay Beardsley
- Date of birth: April 21, 2003 (age 23)
- Height: 5 ft 8 in (1.73 m)
- Position: Goalkeeper

Team information
- Current team: Tampa Bay Sun (on loan from the Houston Dash)
- Number: 17

Youth career
- West Florida Flames

College career
Years	Team	Apps	(Gls)
2020–2022	Georgia Bulldogs	15	(0)
2023–2024	Maryland Terrapins	37	(0)

Senior career*
Years	Team	Apps	(Gls)
2025–	Houston Dash	0	(0)
2026–	→ Tampa Bay Sun (loan)	9	(0)

International career^{‡}
2025	United States U23	1	(0)
- * Club domestic league appearances and goals as of 00:48, August 26, 2026 (UTC) ‡ National team caps and goals as of December 2, 2025

Elizabeth Kay Beardsley (born April 21, 2003) is an American professional soccer player who plays as a goalkeeper for USL Super League club Tampa Bay Sun, on loan from the Houston Dash. She played college soccer for the Georgia Bulldogs and the Maryland Terrapins.

== Early life ==
A native of Lakeland, Florida, Beardsley was born to parents Josh and Tiffany Beardsley. She participated in both soccer and cross country before dedicating herself entirely to soccer. Beardsley played club soccer for the West Florida Flames, where she was a starting goalkeeper and club captain. She also played soccer for Lakeland Senior High School while receiving an education.

== College career ==
=== Georgia Bulldogs ===
At the start of her career with the Georgia Bulldogs, Beardsley saw little playing time and instead learned from starting goalkeeper Emory Wegener. She was named to the 2021 SEC Academic Honor Roll while in a backup role. Then, as a sophomore, Beardsley was able to rise to a starting position following Wegener's departure and ended up playing in 14 of Georgia's matches before being benched for Jordan Brown. She allowed 12 goals and recorded 7 clean sheets.

=== Maryland Terrapins ===
Leading up to the 2023 season, Beardsley transferred to the University of Maryland. In her first year with the Maryland Terrapins, she led the team in minutes and started all 18 games. She became the first Terrapin to record 6 shutouts in a single season since 2014, and was also named to the CSC Academic All-District Team. The following year, Beardsley once again started every single match. She registered 74 saves, 5 shutouts, and captained the team as her college career came to a close.

== Club career ==
Beardsley joined the Houston Dash's preseason squad as a non-rostered invitee ahead of the 2025 NWSL season. On March 11, 2025, Beardsley signed a short-term contract with the Dash, which, two months later, was upgraded to a permanent contract through the end of the season. On June 30, 2025, she signed a new deal with Houston through 2027 with a mutual option for an additional year; the very same month, she was placed on the Dash's 45-day injury list and forced to miss a portion of her rookie season.

In January 2026, Beardsley joined USL Super League club Tampa Bay Sun on loan for the entire year. She made her professional debut on January 31, starting in a 2–2 draw with Spokane Zephyr FC to open the second half of Tampa Bay's season.

== International career ==
Beardsley was called up to the United States under-23 team, for a training camp concurrent with the senior national team, in October 2025.

== Career statistics ==
=== Club ===
As of August 22, 2026, 2026

Appearances and goals by club, season and competition
Club	Season	League			Cup		Playoffs		Total	
Club	Season	Division	Apps	Goals	Apps	Goals	Apps	Goals	Apps	Goals
Houston Dash	2025	NWSL	0	0	—		—		0	0
Tampa Bay Sun FC (loan)	2025–26	USL Super League	7	0	—		—		7	0
Tampa Bay Sun FC (loan)	2026	USL Super League	2	0	—		—		2	0
Career total			9	0	0	0	0	0	9	0
