= Sandrine Gaillard =

Swiss footballer (born 1996)

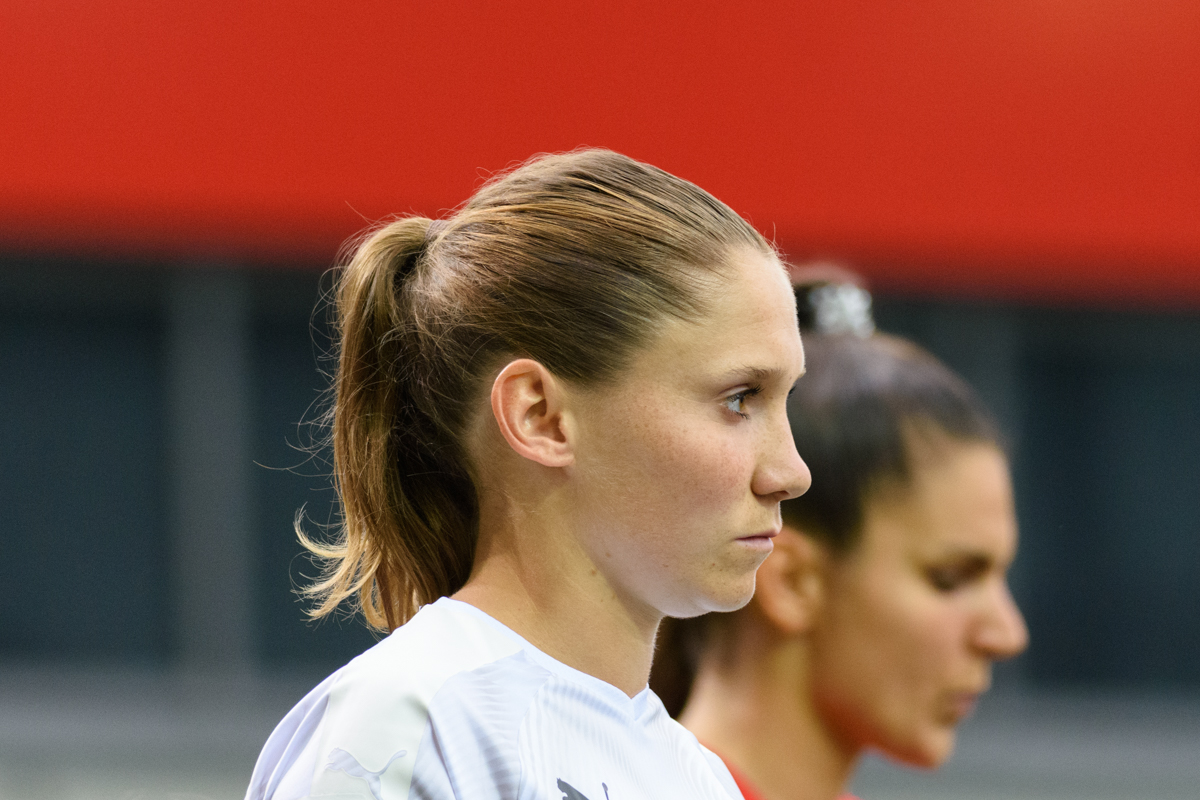

Personal information
- Full name: Sandrine Gaillard
- Birth name: Sandrine Mauron
- Date of birth: 19 December 1996 (age 29)
- Place of birth: Yverdon-les-Bains, Switzerland
- Height: 1.63 m (5 ft 4 in)
- Position: Midfielder

Team information
- Current team: FC Yverdon

Youth career
- 2005–2010: FC Grandson-Tuileries
- 2010–2011: FC Yverdon Féminin

Senior career*
Years	Team	Apps	(Gls)
2011	FC Grandson-Tuileries		
2011–2012	FC Yverdon Féminin		
2012	FC Grandson-Tuileries		
2012–2014	FC Yverdon Féminin		
2014–2019	FC Zürich		
2019–2022	Eintracht Frankfurt	59	(2)
2022–2025	Servette Chênois	49	(9)
2025–2026	Tampa Bay Sun	24	(1)
2026–	FC Yverdon Féminin	0	(0)

International career
2012–2013	Switzerland U17	6	(2)
2014–2015	Switzerland U19	9	(1)
2016–	Switzerland	43	(2)
- * Club domestic league appearances and goals as of 03:41, 18 May 2026 (UTC)

Sandrine Gaillard (née Mauron; born 19 December 1996) is a Swiss footballer who plays as a midfielder for Swiss Women's Super League club FC Yverdon and the Switzerland national team.

== Club career ==
Gaillard started her professional career at FC Yverdon Féminin, a team playing in the Nationalliga A, the highest-level league competition for women's football clubs in Switzerland.

In 2014, Gaillard moved to Swiss traditional club FC Zürich. With the team, she was twice national champions and won two national cups. She also played in four consecutive editions of the UEFA Champions League.

On 29 June 2025, Gaillard signed a contract with USL Super League champions Tampa Bay Sun FC. She made 24 appearances and racked up 1,148 minutes for the Sun before departing from the club after one season.

On 7 July 2026, Gillard returned to FC Yverdon Féminin on a one-year contract.

== International career ==
=== Youth ===
Gaillard was part of the squad that represented Switzerland at 2013 UEFA Women's Under-17 Championship qualification when she played six matches and scored two goals. With the U19 team, Gaillard played in the 2015 UEFA Women's Under-19 Championship qualification and the 2016 UEFA Women's Under-19 Championship qualification. In the 2016 edition, Switzerland was able to qualify for the final tournament reaching the semi-finals when they were defeated by France, that would eventually win the tournament.

=== Senior ===
In 2015, Gaillard was called for Swiss Senior Team for the first time. In 2016, she made her debut for the team. On 23 October 2016, in a friendly match against United States, she scored her first international goal. On 3 July 2017 Gaillard was called by coach Martina Voss-Tecklenburg to represent Switzerland at the UEFA Women's Euro 2017, but she didn't play any matches as Switzerland was eliminated in the tournament's group stage.

In 2022, she took part in the Euros in England with another defeat in the group stage and a year later she was selected as part of the final squad that went to Australia and New Zealand to play in the 2023 World Cup. Switzerland made it to the last 16, where they lost to the eventual champion Spain.

On 23 June 2025, Gaillard was called up to the Switzerland squad for the UEFA Women's Euro 2025.

== International goals ==
No.	Date	Venue	Opponent	Score	Result	Competition
1.	23 October 2016	U.S. Bank Stadium, Minneapolis, United States	United States	1–0	1–5	Friendly
2.	9 March 2016	Stadion Woudestein, Rotterdam, Netherlands	Norway	1–1	2–1	2016 UEFA Women's Olympic Qualifying Tournament

== Awards ==
Yverdon

- Swiss Cup Winner: 2010, 2011

FC Zurich

- Swiss Champion: 2015, 2016, 2018, 2019
- Swiss Cup Winner: 2015, 2016, 2018, 2019

Servette FC Chênois Féminin

- Swiss Champion: 2024
- Swiss Cup winner: 2023, 2024

Personal awards

- Swiss All Star Team: 2015, 2016, 2017
