= Jordyn Listro =

Canadian soccer player (born 1995)

Personal information
- Birth name: Jordyn Nicole Listro
- Date of birth: August 10, 1995 (age 31)
- Place of birth: Toronto, Ontario, Canada
- Height: 1.65 m (5 ft 5 in)
- Position: Midfielder

Team information
- Current team: Tampa Bay Sun
- Number: 5

Youth career
- Wexford SC
- Brams United
- Ontario Soccer NTC

College career
Years	Team	Apps	(Gls)
2013–2016	South Florida Bulls	82	(0)

Senior career*
Years	Team	Apps	(Gls)
2011–2014	Toronto Lady Lynx		
2015	Sanjaxx Lions		
2017	UDG Tenerife	5	(0)
2020	Orlando Pride	0	(0)
2021	Kansas City Current	7	(0)
2022–2023	Orlando Pride	34	(0)
2024–	Tampa Bay Sun	64	(1)

International career^{‡}
2012	Canada U17	1	(0)
2021–	Canada	2	(0)
- * Club domestic league appearances and goals as of 00:51, 7 November 2026 (UTC) ‡ National team caps and goals as of February 24, 2021

Jordyn Nicole Listro DiMarco (née Listro; born August 10, 1995) is a Canadian professional soccer player who plays as a midfielder for Tampa Bay Sun FC of the USL Super League and the Canada national team.

== Early life ==
Born in Toronto, Canada, Listro was a standout soccer player at Bayview Glen School and was awarded team MVP 2009–11. She played club soccer for Wexford SC and the Ontario Soccer National Training Centre as a youth, later playing for Toronto Lady Lynx in the USL W-League and Sanjaxx Lions in League1 Ontario.

== College career ==
Listro played college soccer at the University of South Florida while majoring in health sciences. She was a four-year starter for the South Florida Bulls between 2013 and 2016, becoming the program's record appearance maker with 82. As a senior she was named to the AAC All-Conference Second Team.

== Club career ==
=== UDG Tenerife ===
Listro entered the 2017 NWSL College Draft but was not selected. In June 2017, she signed with Spanish Primera División team UDG Tenerife. Listro made her professional debut starting in a 1–1 with Rayo Vallecano on September 3, 2017. She made a total of five appearances for the team before departing in November 2017, returning to Canada for personal reasons.

=== Orlando Pride ===
After a spell working as a medical sales representative, Listro attempted to make a return to professional soccer and was a trialist with Orlando Pride during 2020 preseason. With the season disrupted by the COVID-19 pandemic, Listro was one of seven players signed to a short-term contract with Orlando in order to compete in the Fall Series in September following the team's decision to loan out 11 senior players to play regularly overseas. She made her debut on September 19, 2020, in the first fall series match, starting in a 0–0 draw with North Carolina Courage. She started in three of the four Fall Series matches for a combined 262 minutes. Ahead of the 2021 season, Listro re-signed with the club on a one-year deal with an option for an additional season.

=== Kansas City Current ===
On March 30, 2021, Listro was traded to expansion side Kansas City NWSL (later renamed Kansas City Current) in exchange for a third-round pick in 2022 NWSL Draft, changing to a second-round pick should certain conditions be met. On December 8, 2021, it was announced Listro had been released as part of the team's offseason roster moves.

On December 14, 2021, Listro was selected off the waiver wire by the North Carolina Courage. In March 2022, she was released prior to the start of the season having not been named to the final roster.

=== Orlando Pride ===
On May 7, 2022, it was announced Listro had rejoined Orlando Pride for the remainder of the 2022 season. Listro was designated as a restricted free agent upon the expiry of her contract at the end of the 2023 season.

=== Tampa Bay Sun ===
On April 23, 2024, Listro was announced as one of the first-ever signings for Tampa Bay Sun, who began play in the USL Super League in August 2024. She was joined by fellow NWSL alumni Domi Richardson and Erika Tymrak. Listro was also named captain of the 2024–2025 team. During a match against Dallas Trinity on May 3, 2025, Listro became the first player to receive a red card in the history of the USL Super League.

== International career ==
In addition to Canada, Listro was eligible to represent Italy at the international level; her grandparents were born there. In 2012, Listro was named to the Canada under-17 squad for the 2012 FIFA U-17 Women's World Cup held in Azerbaijan. She made one appearance at the tournament, as a substitute in the opening game against Nigeria.

After Canada Soccer had dropped contact with Listro when she went to college, she received her first senior national team call-up in January 2021 for a training camp ahead of the 2021 SheBelieves Cup. She was one of six uncapped players named to incoming head coach Bev Priestman's first squad. Listro made her senior international debut on February 21, starting in the second game of the tournament and playing 61 minutes of a 1–0 win over Argentina.

== Personal life ==
In November 2021, Listro got engaged to fellow University of South Florida alumnus and professional golfer Cristian DiMarco; they were married in January 2023. The pair had started dating in March 2017.

== Career statistics ==
=== Club ===
As of matches played 1 November 2026.

Club	Season	League			Cup (Note: NWSL Challenge Cup)		Playoffs		Other		Total	
Club	Season	Division	Apps	Goals	Apps	Goals	Apps	Goals	Apps	Goals	Apps	Goals
UDG Tenerife	2017–18	Primera División	5	0	0	0	—		—		5	0
Orlando Pride	2020	NWSL	—		—		—		3 (Note: Includes the NWSL Fall Series)	0	3	0
Kansas City Current	2021	NWSL	7	0	2	0	—		—		9	0
Orlando Pride	2022	NWSL	19	0	0	0	—		—		19	0
Orlando Pride	2023	NWSL	15	0	5	0	—		—		20	0
Tampa Bay Sun FC	2024–25	USL Super League	27	1	—		2	0	0	0	29	1
Tampa Bay Sun FC	2025–26	USL Super League	28	0	—		0	0	0	0	28	0
2026	8	0	—		0	0	0	0	8	0		
Career total			109	1	7	0	2	0	3	0	122	1

=== International ===
As of February 24, 2021

Canada
Year	Apps	Goals
2021	2	0
Total	2	0

== Honors ==
Tampa Bay Sun

- USL Super League: 2024–25
