= Jilly Shimkin =

American soccer player (born 2003)

- Shimkin with Texas in 2024

Personal information
- Full name: Jillian Alexandra Shimkin
- Date of birth: February 21, 2003 (age 23)
- Place of birth: Rockville Centre, New York, U.S.
- Height: 5 ft 3 in (1.60 m)
- Positions: Attacking midfielder; forward

Team information
- Current team: Brooklyn FC
- Number: 17

Youth career
- Albertson Fury
- New York SC

College career
Years	Team	Apps	(Gls)
2021	Penn State Nittany Lions	19	(0)
2022–2024	Texas Longhorns	69	(15)

Senior career*
Years	Team	Apps	(Gls)
2021–2022	Downtown United	–	(–)
2024	Tampa Bay United	4	(3)
2025–2026	Tampa Bay Sun	23	(1)
2026–	Brooklyn FC	12	(0)

International career
2017–2018	United States U-15		
2017	United States U-16		
2019	United States U-17		
- * Club domestic league appearances and goals as of November 12, 2026

Jillian Alexandra Shimkin (born February 21, 2003) is an American professional soccer player who plays as an attacking midfielder for USL Super League club Brooklyn FC. She played college soccer for the Penn State Nittany Lions and the Texas Longhorns. She began her professional career with the Tampa Bay Sun in 2025.

== Early life ==
Shimkin was born in Rockville Centre, New York, one of four children born to Jodie and Pete Shimkin. Her younger sister Chloe played with her at Texas for one season. Shimkin began playing soccer at age four. She attended South Side High School but did not play high school soccer. She played club soccer for Albertson Fury and New York Soccer Club, earning United Soccer Coaches All-American honors three times. She was ranked by TopDrawerSoccer as the seventh-best recruit of the 2021 class. She committed to Penn State as a freshman.

== College career ==
Shimkin played one season for the Penn State Nittany Lions in 2021, starting in 15 games. She then transferred to the Texas Longhorns in 2022. She started all 22 games and scored 7 goals with 7 assists, earning second-team All-Big 12 Conference honors. She opened scoring in the game that clinched the Big 12 regular-season title for Texas and did the same in the first round of the NCAA tournament. In her junior season in 2023, she recorded 12 assists and added 4 goals in 24 games. She assisted Lexi Missimo's winning goal to advance to the third round of the NCAA tournament, where they lost to eventual champions Florida State. She finished her senior season in 2024 with 4 goals and 6 assists in 23 games, winning the SEC tournament in Texas's first season in the conference and assisting in both of the team's games in the NCAA tournament.

During college, Shimkin played in the summer with Women's Premier Soccer League club Downtown United and USL W League club Tampa Bay United.

== Club career ==
Shimkin joined the North Carolina Courage as a non-roster trialist in the 2025 preseason. In June, she played for Austin Rise FC at the Soccer Tournament 2025, a seven-a-side tournament. The following month, she signed her first professional contract with USL Super League club Tampa Bay Sun, having trained with the club the previous year.

On August 23, 2025, Shimkin made her professional debut for the Sun, replacing Ava Tankersley at halftime in a season-opening 2–1 loss to Brooklyn FC. On March 27, 2026, she scored her first professional goal in a 2–0 win over DC Power FC. Shimkin left the Sun after her rookie season having made 23 appearances and scored 1 goal.

On August 5, 2026, it was announced that Shimkin had signed with fellow USL Super League club Brooklyn FC, making a homecoming to New York. She debuted for the club in their season-opening 3–0 defeat to reigning champions Lexington SC. On October 31, she set up three goals in a 4–4 draw with Sporting JAX, becoming the first player in league history to provide three assists in a single match.

== International career ==
Shimkin began training with the United States youth national team at the under-14 level. She appeared in friendlies for the under-15, under-16, and under-17 teams between 2017 and 2019. She played for the under-23 team against NWSL teams in the 2023 preseason.

In 2024, Shimkin tried out for the United States national futsal team in advance of the inaugural 2025 FIFA Futsal Women's World Cup.

== Honors and awards ==
Texas Longhorns

- Big 12 Conference: 2022
- Big 12 Conference tournament: 2023
- SEC tournament: 2024

Individual

- Second-team All-Big 12: 2022
