= Emory Wegener =

American soccer player (born 2000)

Personal information
- Full name: Emory Ann Wegener
- Date of birth: May 4, 2000 (age 26)
- Height: 5 ft 7 in (1.70 m)
- Position: Goalkeeper

Team information
- Current team: Tampa Bay Sun
- Number: 44

Youth career
- Atlanta Fire United

College career
Years	Team	Apps	(Gls)
2018–2021	Georgia Bulldogs	66	(0)
2022	Maryland Terrapins	6	(0)

Senior career*
Years	Team	Apps	(Gls)
2022	Asheville City SC	9	(0)
2025–	Tampa Bay Sun	8	(0)

Managerial career
- 2023: Asheville City SC (assistant)
- * Club domestic league appearances and goals as of 03:47, May 18, 2026 (UTC)

Emory Ann Wegener (born May 4, 2000) is an American professional soccer player who plays as a goalkeeper for USL Super League club Tampa Bay Sun FC. She played college soccer for the Georgia Bulldogs and the Maryland Terrapins.

== Early life ==
Wegener was born to Mark and Carrie Wegener and was raised in Johns Creek, Georgia. As a young child, she dabbled in tennis as well as soccer. Wegener played club for Atlanta Fire United, although she chose to focus solely on high school soccer in her senior year.

Wegener attended St. Pius X Catholic High School, where she helped the team win three state titles. As a freshman, she made three saves in the championship-deciding penalty shoot-out victory over the Marist School. In 2017, she was named her school's Most Valuable Player. Wegener tore a ligament in her hand prior to St. Pius X's 2018 state championship game, but she still participated in the game as a forward. She scored a goal, but the Marist School claimed revenge and smothered any chance for St. Pius X to win its fourth state title in a row.

== College career ==
=== Georgia Bulldogs ===
Wegener played four seasons of college soccer with the Georgia Bulldogs, starting in 2018. In September of her rookie season, she was named the SEC Freshman of the Week after performing well in her first-ever conference game. Wegener ended up recording 17 starts in both of her first two college seasons and quickly rose to fifth in Georgia's all-time shutout leaderboard.

Wegener was named to the SEC Preseason Watchlist ahead of her junior year and soon justified the recognition, posting a season that earned her a spot on the All-SEC second team. Her 7 shutouts was second in the conference and her save percentage ranked third. Wegener played one more season at Georgia, playing 18 full matches and registering a career-high 70 saves. She finished her career with the Bulldogs having started all 66 games in which she appeared.

=== Maryland Terrapins ===
As a graduate student, Wegener transferred to the University of Maryland, College Park. She played in 6 games for the Terrapins, splitting time with senior Madeline Smith. In October 2022, Wegener made a season-high 7 saves as Michigan State extended Maryland's losing streak to 4 consecutive games.

== Club career ==
After going undrafted in the 2022 NWSL Draft, Wegener spent time as a preseason non-roster invitee with NWSL expansion club San Diego Wave FC. However, it was fellow trialist Melissa Lowder who instead won the Wave's third-string goalkeeper spot.

Wegener went on to join pre-professional club Asheville City SC ahead of the inaugural USL W League season. She made 9 appearances in 2022, posting a 1.48 goals-against average. The following season, Wegener returned to Asheville City as an assistant coach. She also spent time as the goalkeeping director for local North Carolina youth club HFC United.

On July 18, 2025, Wegener signed her first professional contract with USL Super League club Tampa Bay Sun FC. She made her pro debut on September 20, 2025, playing in a 1–1 draw with the Dallas Trinity. After spending the rest of the first half of the season on the bench, Wegener made her second appearance for Tampa Bay in February 2026, recording her first professional clean sheet against Fort Lauderdale United FC. During the match, she made a save that was later named the USL Super League's February Save of the Month.

== Career statistics ==
=== Club ===
As of matched played on March 31, 2026

Appearances and goals by club, season and competition
Club	Season	League			Cup		Playoffs		Total	
Club	Season	Division	Apps	Goals	Apps	Goals	Apps	Goals	Apps	Goals
Asheville City SC	2022	USL W League	9	0	—		—		9	0
Tampa Bay Sun FC	2025–26	USL Super League	6	0	—		—		6	0
Career total			15	0	0	0	0	0	15	0
