= Sabrina McNeill =

Canadian soccer player

Personal information
- Full name: Sabrina Angela McNeill
- Date of birth: April 24, 1998 (age 28)
- Height: 1.63 m (5 ft 4 in)
- Position: Defender

Team information
- Current team: Tampa Bay Sun FC
- Number: 6

Youth career
- Oshawa Kicks Inferno

College career
Years	Team	Apps	(Gls)
2016–2020	Eastern Michigan Eagles	70	(27)
2021–23	Auburn Tigers	18	(2)

Senior career*
Years	Team	Apps	(Gls)
2023–2024	Omonoia FC	6	(2)
2024–2025	Fort Lauderdale United FC	17	(0)
2025–	Tampa Bay Sun FC	33	(2)
- * Club domestic league appearances and goals as of 00:48, 7 November 2026 (UTC)

Sabrina Angela McNeill (born April 24, 1998) is a Canadian professional soccer player who plays as a defender for Tampa Bay Sun FC in the USL Super League. She played collegiately for Eastern Michigan and Auburn.

== Early life and education ==
McNeill began playing soccer at age four and initially played as a goalkeeper before transitioning to an outfield role due to her speed and athleticism. She played youth soccer for Oshawa Kicks Inferno and helped the squad to a L3 league title, before moving to the United States for college. McNeill attended Henry Street High School, where she played soccer and volleyball. During her tenth-grade year, she began pursuing opportunities to play collegiate soccer in the United States, ultimately earning a full athletic scholarship to Eastern Michigan University. She studied exercise science during her university career.

== College career ==
=== Eastern Michigan Eagles ===
McNeill played four seasons for the Eastern Michigan Eagles, recording 27 goals and 67 points in over 70 appearances. She was named Mid-American Conference (MAC) Freshman of the Year in 2016 and earned First Team All-MAC honors from 2018 to 2021. In 2021, she became the program's second United Soccer Coaches Scholar All-American and was selected to the Second Team of the 2021 NCAA Female All-Canadian list by FTF Canada. During her time at Eastern Michigan, McNeill served as team captain and competed in five seasons with the program.

=== Auburn Tigers ===
In 2021, she transferred to Auburn to play for the Tigers women's soccer team, joining the team as part of their 2021 signing class under head coach Karen Hoppa. McNeill transferred to Auburn University as a graduate student, joining the Auburn Tigers for the 2021 season. She made several appearances as a forward and midfielder, recording a brace against Southern Miss. Early in her tenure at Auburn, McNeill suffered an anterior cruciate ligament (ACL) tear in her second match with the program. It marked the second ACL injury of her career. She underwent reconstructive surgery and completed rehabilitation before returning to competition.

== Club career ==
=== Omonoia FC ===
Following her collegiate career, McNeill signed her first professional contract with Omonoia FC in the Cypriot First Division. She spent a season with the club before returning to North America to continue her professional career.

=== Fort Lauderdale United FC ===
After college, McNeill played professionally for Fort Lauderdale United FC, making 17 starts and helping the team reach the league final in 2024–25.

For her performances during the 2024–25 season, McNeill was named to the USL Super League Team of the Month twice — in December 2024 and May 2025.

=== Tampa Bay Sun FC ===
On July 18, 2025, McNeill signed with Tampa Bay Sun FC ahead of the club's second USL Super League season. She quickly became a regular starter in defence, noted for her composure, intelligent positioning, and ability to play both centrally and wide. In September 2025, she recorded her first assist for the club in a 2–1 away win over Carolina Ascent FC.

== Personal life ==
McNeill playing soccer at age four. She majored in communications while at Eastern Michigan and enjoys photography and traveling. She has cited her parents as her biggest inspiration and lists representing Canada internationally as a personal goal.

Her favourite TV and film series are The 100 and Divergent series. Her favourite meal consists of ribs, sweet potatoes, and cooked vegetables.

== Honours ==
USL Super League

- Team of the Month: December 2024, May 2025

Mid-American Conference

- Freshman of the Year: 2016
- First Team All-Conference: 2018, 2019, 2020–21

United Soccer Coaches

- Third Team Scholar All-America: 2021
