= Sydney Schneider =

Jamaican footballer (born 1999)

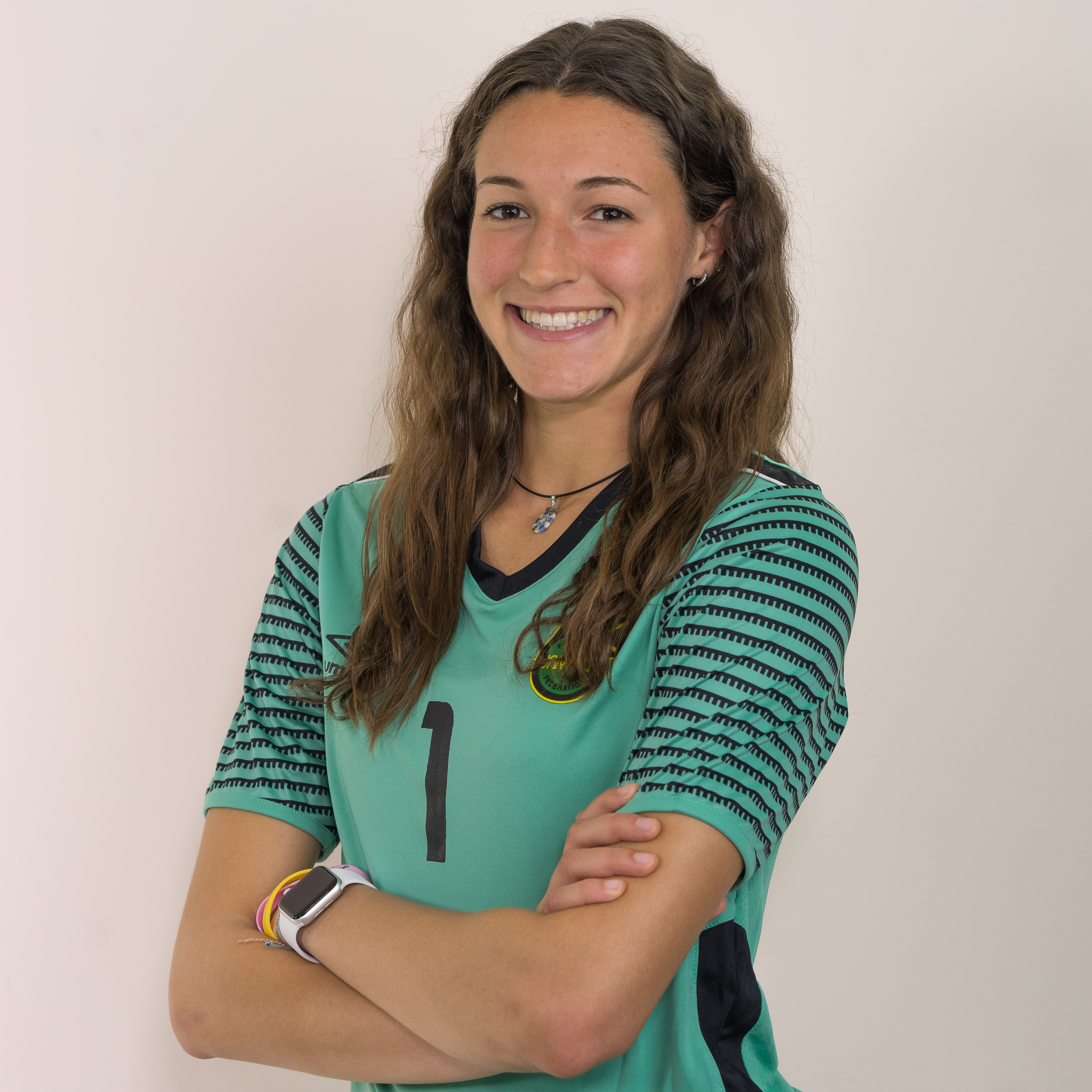
- Schneider in 2019

Personal information
- Full name: Sydney Michelle Schneider
- Date of birth: 31 August 1999 (age 27)
- Place of birth: Dayton, New Jersey, United States
- Height: 1.78 m (5 ft 10 in)
- Position: Goalkeeper

Youth career
- Match Fit Academy

College career
Years	Team	Apps	(Gls)
2017–2020	UNC Wilmington Seahawks	44	(0)

Senior career*
Years	Team	Apps	(Gls)
2021	Washington Spirit	0	(0)
2022	Kansas City Current	0	(0)
2023–2024	Sparta Prague	15	(0)
2024	Chicago Red Stars	0	(0)
2025–2026	Tampa Bay Sun	16	(0)

International career^{‡}
2016–2017	Jamaica U-17		
2017–2018	Jamaica U-20	3	(0)
2018–	Jamaica	23	(0)
Medal record
Representing Jamaica
CONCACAF W Championship
Third place	2018 United States
Third place	2022 Mexico
- * Club domestic league appearances and goals as of 03:46, 18 May 2026 (UTC) ‡ National team caps and goals as of 29 November 2025

Sydney Michelle Schneider (born 31 August 1999) is a professional footballer who plays as a goalkeeper. Born in the United States, she represents Jamaica internationally. She played college soccer for the UNC Wilmington Seahawks and was drafted by the Washington Spirit in the third round of the 2021 NWSL Draft. She has also been a member of the Kansas City Current and Chicago Red Stars and played for Sparta Prague and Tampa Bay Sun.

== Early life ==
Schneider was born and raised in the Dayton section of South Brunswick, New Jersey, to Andrea (formerly Schneider, née Wisdom) and David Kapinos (stepfather). She attended South Brunswick High School.

== College career ==
In February 2017, Schneider signed a letter of intent to join the UNC Wilmington Seahawks. In her freshman year she started all 19 games, becoming only the second goalkeeper in school history to play every minute in a season. Schneider was also named the Colonial Athletic Association (CAA) Goalkeeper of the Year in 2019.

== Club career ==
She was drafted 29th overall by Washington Spirit in the 2021 NWSL Draft. In January 2023, Schneider signed with Sparta Prague of the Czech Women's First League. In May 2023, Schneider signed a one-year extension ahead of the 2023–24 season.

On 29 January 2024, Schneider signed a one-year contract with a one-year option with National Women's Soccer League club Chicago Red Stars for an undisclosed transfer fee.

On 25 February 2025, Schneider signed with USL Super League club Tampa Bay Sun.

== International career ==
Schneider qualified to play for the United States (her birthplace and her mother's), Germany (her biological father's birthplace) or Jamaica (her maternal grandparents' birthplace). She turned down the chance to play with the Jamaica U-17 team in 2015 but accepted in 2016 and represented Jamaica at the 2016 CONCACAF Women's U-17 Championship.

At the 2018 CONCACAF Women's U-20 Championship Schneider played all three group games for Jamaica. They finished last in their group and did not qualify for the knockout round.

Schneider was named to the Jamaican squad for the 2018 CONCACAF Women's Championship. In their second group match against Costa Rica, Schneider was named player of the match as she made some key saves, helping Jamaica secure an upset 1–0 victory over the 34th ranked team.

Schneider was chosen by coach Hue Menzies as the first choice in Jamaica's goal at the 2019 FIFA Women's World Cup. In her debut against Brazil, she saved a penalty kick and had a prominent participation during the match, despite having lost it by 0–3.

== Personal life ==
Schneider comes from a multicultural family. Her biological father, Ernie, is German; her mother, Andrea, was born in the United States to a Jamaican-born father, and a Jamaican mother; and her stepfather David is of Greek descent.

== Honors ==
Washington Spirt

- NWSL Championship: 2021

Tampa Bay Sun

- USL Super League: 2024–25
