= Taylor Chism =

American soccer player (born 2003)

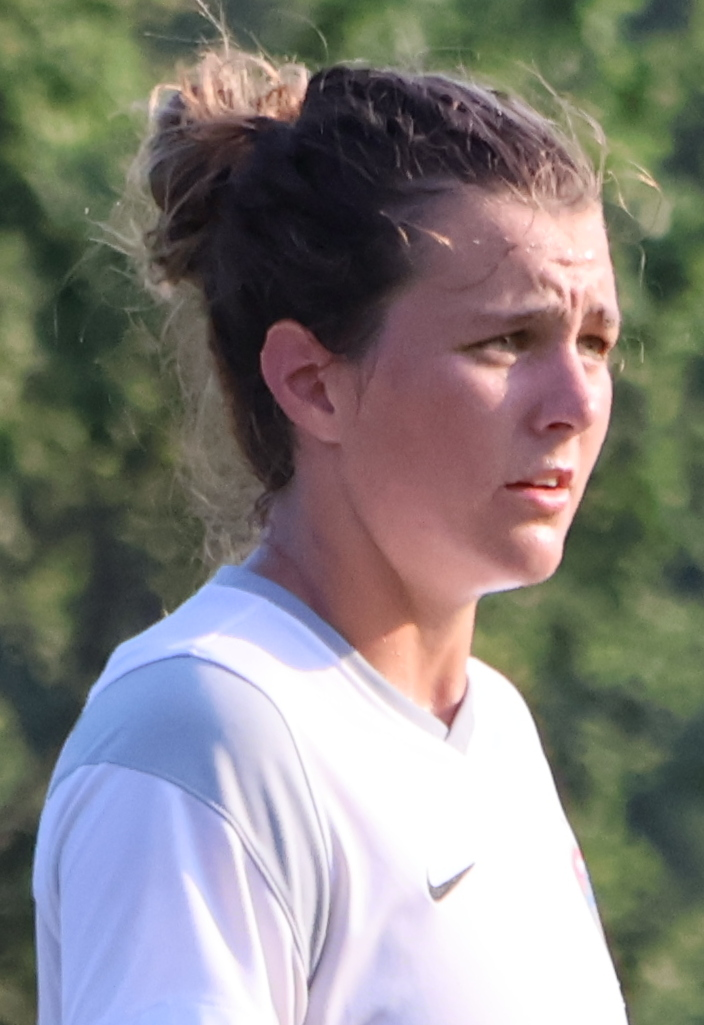
- Chism with the North Carolina Courage U23 in 2024

Personal information
- Full name: Taylor Marie Chism
- Date of birth: October 26, 2003 (age 23)
- Height: 5 ft 9 in (1.75 m)
- Position: Defender

Team information
- Current team: Tampa Bay Sun
- Number: 26

Youth career
- Wilmington Hammerheads

College career
Years	Team	Apps	(Gls)
2022–2024	NC State Wolfpack	47	(3)
2025	Auburn Tigers	18	(2)

Senior career*
Years	Team	Apps	(Gls)
2023–2024	North Carolina Courage U23	29	(3)
2026–	Tampa Bay Sun	22	(0)
- * Club domestic league appearances and goals as of 00:36, November 7, 2026 (UTC)

Taylor Marie Chism (born October 26, 2003) is an American professional soccer player who plays as a defender for USL Super League club Tampa Bay Sun FC. She played college soccer for the NC State Wolfpack and the Auburn Tigers.

== Early life ==
Chism grew up in Wilmington, North Carolina, as one of three children born to Marie Riley and Heath Chism. She played youth soccer for local club Wilmington Hammerheads. Chism attended Emsley A. Laney High School, where she was a two-time all-state and all-region honoree with the school's soccer team. She was Laney's top scorer in 2022 and ended her high school career with 50 total goals.

A two-sport athlete, Chism also played basketball in high school. In her freshman year, her defensive skills earned her a starting spot on Laney's varsity team. Her offensive presence also steadily rose over the next few seasons, and she became the team's leading scorer as a junior. Chism has credited her soccer experience as a key factor in her ability to read the game and apply effective defense in basketball.

== College career ==
Chism elected to focus fully on soccer after finishing high school. She joined the NC State Wolfpack in 2022 and made an immediate impact in her collegiate debut, scoring in a 4–0 victory over Rhode Island to help NC State kick off the season on a positive note. She went on to make 14 appearances as a freshman, including 3 starts. On November 13, 2022, she played a season-high 110 minutes in NC State's NCAA tournament first round defeat to Vanderbilt. As a sophomore, Chism became a regular starter. She played 11 complete 90-minute games and helped contribute to three clean sheets. Chism's junior year with the Wolfpack would prove to be her last; she started in all 18 of her appearances and played at least 70 minutes in each game.

In December 2024, Chism transferred from NC State to Auburn University. She, along with three other Auburn teammates, was named to the SEC preseason watchlist in August 2025. In her lone season with the Tigers, Chism was named team captain, started all 18 of Auburn's matches, contributed to 6 clean sheets, and was named the program's Iron Woman of the season. She was also an offensive threat, recording 24 shots, 2 goals, and 2 assists as a set-piece target.

== Club career ==
=== North Carolina Courage U23 ===
In the summers before her sophomore and junior years at NC State, Chism joined pre-professional USL W League team North Carolina Courage U23. In 2023, she came on as a substitute in the league's championship match and registered a shot off the post as North Carolina lost to Indy Eleven, 2–1. The following year, Chism ended up contributing to the Courage's first-ever USL W League title, playing all 90 minutes of North Carolina's championship win over the Colorado Storm. She was named to the all-league first-team after racking up over 1000 minutes of play and scoring 3 goals.

=== Tampa Bay Sun ===
On January 29, 2026, USL Super League club Tampa Bay Sun FC announced that they had signed Chism to her first professional contract. Chism made her pro debut two days later, playing the entirety of a 2–2 draw with Spokane Zephyr FC to open the second half of Tampa Bay's season. She continued to earn playing time for the Sun and was named to the March 2026 USL Super League Team of the Month after making a league-high 36 clearances across the month.

Chism started her second professional season on a positive note, earning a spot on the August 2026 Super League Team of the Month as bench player.
