= Victoria Haugen =

Norwegian-American soccer player (born 2002)

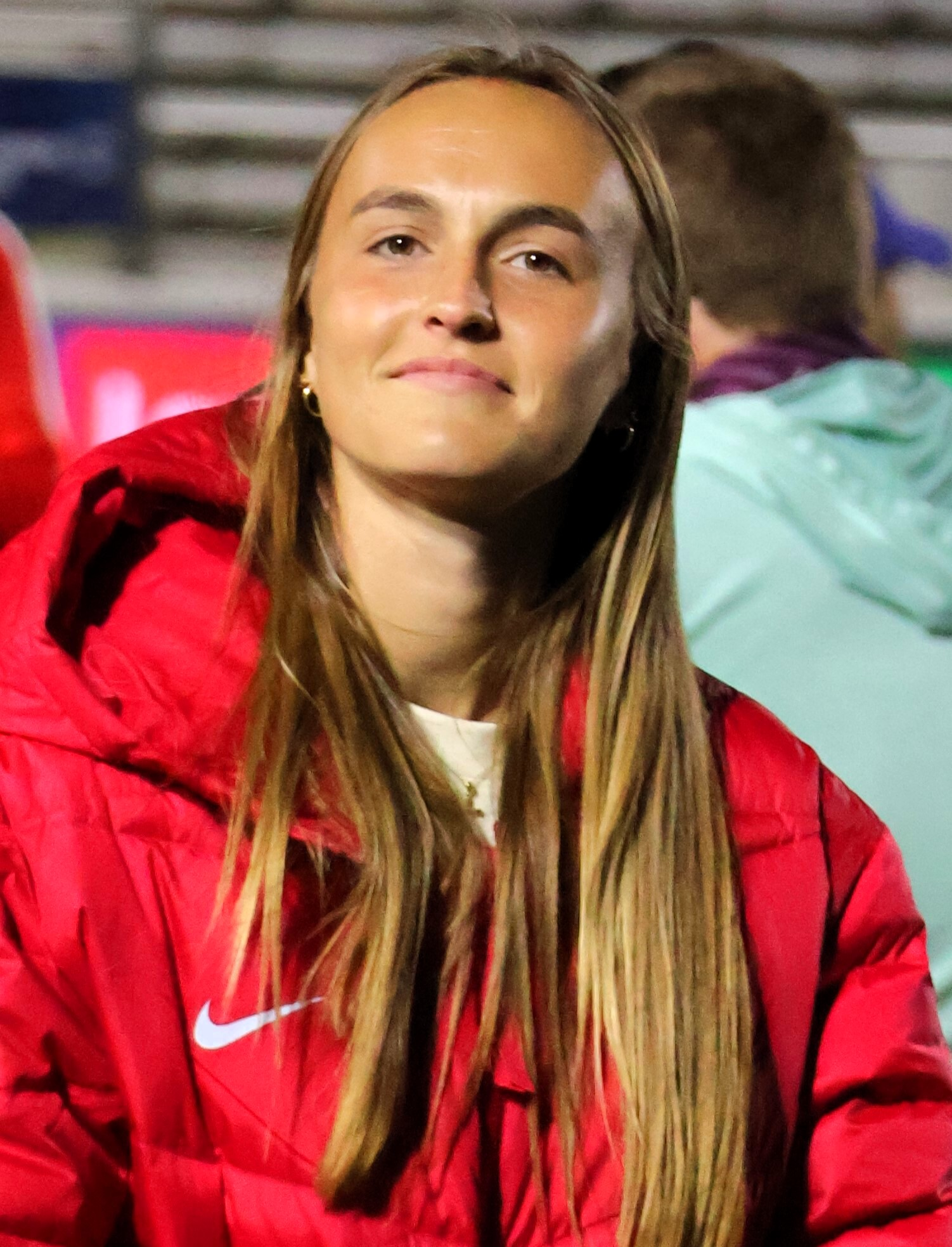
- Haugen in 2024

Personal information
- Full name: Victoria Thorp Haugen
- Date of birth: May 1, 2002 (age 24)
- Place of birth: Fairfax, Virginia, United States
- Height: 5 ft 7 in (1.70 m)
- Positions: Right back; center back

Youth career
- 2014–2019: FC Virginia

College career
Years	Team	Apps	(Gls)
2020–2023	Virginia Tech Hokies	70	(0)

Senior career*
Years	Team	Apps	(Gls)
2023	Northern Virginia FC	6	(0)
2024	North Carolina Courage	0	(0)
2025–2026	Tampa Bay Sun	31	(1)

International career^{‡}
2018	Norway U16	5	(0)
2019	Norway U17	5	(0)
2020	Norway U18	2	(0)
2019–2020	Norway U19	8	(0)
2021	Norway U23	2	(0)
- * Club domestic league appearances and goals as of 03:42, May 18, 2026 (UTC) ‡ National team caps and goals as of August 31, 2025

Victoria Thorp Haugen (born May 1, 2002) is a professional soccer player who plays as a defender. Born in the United States, she is a former youth international for Norway. Haugen played college soccer for the Virginia Tech Hokies before starting her professional career with the North Carolina Courage of the National Women's Soccer League (NWSL) and Tampa Bay Sun FC of the USL Super League.

== Early life ==
Born in Fairfax, Virginia, Haugen grew up in Bristow, Virginia. She began playing soccer when she was five and also participated in gymnastics until about age 12. She played DA club soccer for FC Virginia, captaining the team and earning conference Best XI honors in 2019. She committed to Virginia Tech during her sophomore year at Patriot High School. She had also considered the programs at Boston College, Tennessee, Georgia, Clemson, and South Carolina.

== College career ==
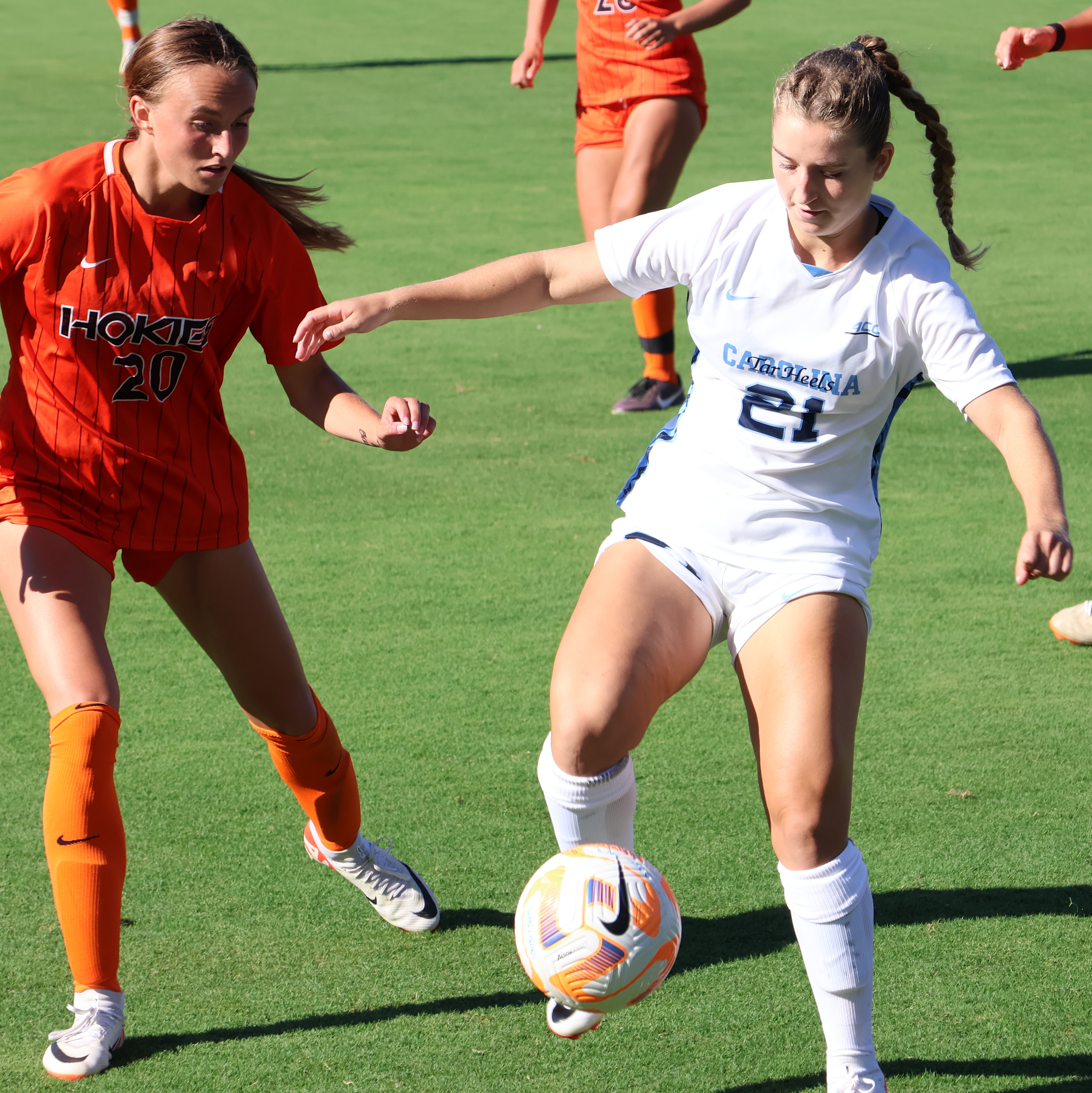
Haugen (left) marking Ally Sentnor in 2023

Haugen played and started in 70 games for the Virginia Tech Hokies, missing only four games during her four seasons in Blacksburg. In her sophomore season in 2021, she helped Virginia Tech to its first NCAA tournament match win in four years, providing an assist in the first round against Ohio State. She started every game and led the team in minutes played during her junior and senior seasons.

== Club career ==
=== North Carolina Courage ===
After going undrafted in the 2024 NWSL Draft, Haugen joined the North Carolina Courage as a non-roster invitee in the 2024 preseason. In June, she played for the Courage–sponsored team at the Soccer Tournament at WakeMed Soccer Park, helping reach the US$1 million final. On July 16, she signed her first professional contract with the Courage, a national team replacement deal for the length of the 2024 Paris Olympics. On August 27, one week after being waived, she re-signed with the team for the 2024 FIFA U-20 Women's World Cup.

=== Tampa Bay Sun ===
On February 6, 2025, USL Super League club Tampa Bay Sun announced that the club had signed Haugen ahead of the spring portion of the league's inaugural season. She made her professional debut two days later, starting and playing the full 2–2 draw against Fort Lauderdale United. On May 10, she scored her professional goal and assisted Cecilie Fløe in a 3–0 win against Lexington. On June 14, she started and played 87 minutes in the inaugural USL Super League final, which Tampa Bay won 1–0 over Fort Lauderdale United through an extra-time goal by Cecilie Fløe.

In her second season in Florida, Haugen started in 10 of her 17 appearances as Tampa Bay finished second-to-last in the Super League standings. On June 17, 2026, the Sun announced Haugen's departure from the club after one-and-a-half years of service.

== International career ==
Haugen has United States and Norwegian citizenship. She began representing Norway in youth international matches at the under-16 level. In October 2019, she was invited to training camp with the United States under-18 team but chose instead to join the Norway under-19 team for 2020 UEFA Women's Under-19 Championship qualification. She appeared in all three matches and helped hold all three opponents scoreless as Norway topped its qualification group, but the subsequent rounds of the tournament would be cancelled due to the COVID-19 pandemic. In January 2020, she captained the Norway under-18 team in a friendly tournament held in the United States. She debuted for the Norway under-23 team in a friendly in October 2021.

== Personal life ==
Haugen is the oldest of three children born to a Norwegian father and an American mother. Her father, Nils, played semi-professional soccer in his home country before moving to the United States at age 21, while her mother, Micki, played field hockey in college at Radford. Haugen often visited Norway with her family in the summer growing up.

== Honors ==
Tampa Bay Sun

- USL Super League: 2024–25
