= Tampa Bay Sun FC =

Women's soccer team in Tampa, Florida

- Founded: May 16, 2023; 3 years ago
- Stadium: Suncoast Credit Union Field; Tampa, Florida
- Capacity: 5,000
- Owner(s): Jeff Fox; David Laxer; Darryl Shaw
- President: Christina Unkel
- Head coach: Denise Schilte-Brown
- League: USL Super League
- 2025–26: USL Super League, 8th of 9
- Website: https://www.tampabaysunfc.com/
Home colors	Away colors

Tampa Bay Sun Football Club is an American professional women's soccer club based in Tampa, Florida, that competes in the USL Super League (USLS). Founded in 2023, the team played its inaugural season in the 2024–25 USLS season. Tampa Bay Sun FC is owned by real estate developer and investor Darryl Shaw, Bern's Steak House owner David Laxer, and former BluePearl executive Jeff Fox.

== History ==
=== Establishment ===
The Tampa Bay area was named as one of the initial USL Super League markets on May 16, 2023. On July 15, 2023, South Florida Bulls women's soccer head coach Denise Schilte-Brown was named as Sun's first-ever head coach, and former FIFA referee Christina Unkel was named as club president.

=== Inaugural season ===
On April 23, 2024. Erika Tymrak was the first player signed to the inaugural roster, followed by Jordyn Listro and Domi Richardson on the same day.

On May 23, 2024, the club announced their home opener would be against Dallas Trinity FC on August 18, 2024. The match was the third ever match played for the USL Super League.

On September 8, 2024, Tampa Bay earned their first win, defeating Lexington SC 3–2 on the road. On November 2, 2024, Tampa Bay earned their first home win, defeating Lexington 3–1.

In March 2025, Tampa Bay became the first USLS team to host a National Women's Soccer League team in a friendly, playing NJ/NY Gotham FC to a 1–1 draw.

Tampa Bay Sun FC defeated Fort Lauderdale United FC in the 2025 USL Super League Championship game to win the league title in their inaugural season.

== Identity ==
Club leadership ran a naming selection contest that received 2,500 naming suggestions. On November 4, 2023, the club announced that nine winners had selected Suns as the teams name and after group meetings it was decided that Tampa Bay Suns best represented the essence of the area. The Tampa Bay Sun FC name, logo, and colors were unveiled on November 4, 2023, at a ceremony in Ybor City attended by Tampa mayor Jane Castor.

=== Sponsorship ===
Period	Kit manufacturer	Shirt sponsor	Sleeve sponsor	Ref.
2024–present	Capelli Sport	Tampa General Hospital	TECO Energy	

== Stadium ==
Tampa Bay Sun FC play at Riverfront Stadium on the campus of Howard W. Blake High School, near downtown Tampa. Renovations were made to bring the stadium up to division one soccer league standards, namely increasing the capacity of the stadium from 1,800 to 5,000, installing turf, and adding a new scoreboard.

The team plans to play at Riverfront Stadium until a new stadium in Ybor City is constructed. Plans for the new stadium were unveiled on June 17, 2025. The stadium, which will have a capacity of 15,000, is to be located on a site once coveted by the Tampa Bay Rays for a new stadium, but was ruled out for baseball use.

== Club culture ==
=== Supporters ===
The first official supporters' group established for the Tampa Bay Sun is The Heatwave. The logo was created by IDC Sport Design.

== Honors ==
- USL Super League
  - Champions: 2024–25

== Players and staff ==
=== Roster ===
As of September 27, 2026

Note: Flags indicate national team as defined under FIFA eligibility rules; some limited exceptions apply. Players may hold more than one non-FIFA nationality.

No.	Pos.	Nation	Player
1	GK	PUR	Cristina Roque (on loan from Racing Louisville)
3	MF	USA	Samantha Kroeger
4	DF	CAN	Vivianne Bessette
5	MF	CAN	Jordyn Listro
6	DF	CAN	Sabrina McNeill
7	DF	USA	Leah Scarpelli
8	FW	USA	Reagan Raabe
9	FW	USA	Shea Connors
10	FW	ENG	Eleanor Dale
11	DF	USA	Kelsey Hill
13	MF	CRO	Erika Zschuppe
14	MF	USA	Alexis Theoret

No.	Pos.	Nation	Player
15	DF	USA	Brooke Hendrix
17	GK	USA	Liz Beardsley (on loan from the Houston Dash)
18	MF	USA	Dasia Torbert
19	FW	USA	Tori Zierenberg
22	FW	USA	Parker Goins
23	FW	ENG	Millie Ravening
24	FW	USA	Kennedy White
26	DF	USA	Taylor Chism
27	DF	USA	Samar Guidry
35	FW	USA	Sydny Nasello
37	DF	USA	Jordan Zade
44	GK	USA	Emory Wegener

==== Academy players ====
Note: Flags indicate national team as defined under FIFA eligibility rules; some limited exceptions apply. Players may hold more than one non-FIFA nationality.

No.	Pos.	Nation	Player
30	DF	USA	Kallie Bleistein
31	MF	USA	Jaeda Russell
32	MF	USA	Addison Jericho

=== Former players ===
For details of former players, see Category:Tampa Bay Sun FC players and List of Tampa Bay Sun FC players.

=== Staff ===
As of September 9, 2024*

Front office
Position	Name
Owners	Jeff Fox; David Laxer; Darryl Shaw
President	(United States) Christina Unkel
Technical staff
Head Coach	Denise Schilte-Brown
Assistant Coach	Erich Leite
Head of Soccer Operations	Sam Ishee

== Records ==
=== Year-by-year ===
As of November 1, 2026

Season	League	Regular season								Playoffs	Avg. attendance	Top Goalscorer	
Season	League	P	W	D	L	GF	GA	Pts	Pos	Playoffs	Avg. attendance	Name(s)	Goals
2024–25	USLS	28	12	10	6	42	28	46	2nd	Champions	3,223	(Denmark) Cecilie Fløe	12
2025–26	USLS	28	5	9	14	27	46	24	8th	Did not qualify	1,963	(United States) Sydny Nasello	6
2026 Fall	USLS	10	2	3	5	11	16	9	7th	TBD	1,685	(United States) Shea Connors	5
Total		66	19	22	25	80	90	–	–	–	–	(United States) Carlee Giammona	13

1. Top goalscorer(s) includes all goals scored in League, and USL Super Cup Playoffs, and other competitive matches.

=== Head coaching record ===
As of November 1, 2026

Only competitive matches are counted.*

All-time Tampa Bay Sun coaching records
Name	Nationality	From	To	P	W	D	L	GF	GA	Win%
Denise Schilte-Brown	Canada	July 15, 2023	present	68	21	22	25	83	91	30.88%

=== Team records ===
As of May 18, 2026. Current players in bold. Statistics are updated once a year after the conclusion of the USL Super League season.

Most appearances
Player					Appearances		
#	Name	Nat.	Pos.	Sun career	USLS	Playoffs	Total
1	**Sydny Nasello**	(United States)	FW	2024–	56	2	58
2	**Vivianne Bessette**	(Canada)	DF	2024–	55	2	57
2	**Brooke Hendrix**	(United States)	DF	2024–	55	2	57
2	**Jordyn Listro**	(Canada)	MF	2024–	55	2	57
5	**Carlee Giammona**	(United States)	MF	2024–	54	2	56
6	**Jordan Zade**	(United States)	DF	2025–	32	2	34
7	Natasha Flint	(England)	FW	2024–2026	31	2	33
7	**Victoria Haugen**	(Norway)	DF	2025–	31	2	33
9	**Gabby Provenzano**	(United States)	MF	2025–	28	2	30
10	**Sabrina McNeill**	(Canada)	DF	2025–	26	0	17

Top goalscorers
Player					Goals scored		
#	Name	Nat.	Pos.	Sun career	USLS	Playoffs	Total
1	**Carlee Giammona**	(United States)	MF	2024–	12	1	**13**
2	Cecilie Fløe	(Denmark)	FW	2024–2025	11	1	**12**
3	Natasha Flint	(England)	FW	2024–2026	10	1	**11**
4	**Sydny Nasello**	(United States)	FW	2024–	10	0	**10**
