= List of Fort Lauderdale United FC players =

Fort Lauderdale United FC is an American professional women's soccer club which began play in the inaugural season of the USL Super League. All players who have made a competitive appearance for Fort Lauderdale United FC are listed below.

== Key ==
- The list is ordered alphabetically.
- Appearances as a substitute are included.
- Statistics are correct as of May 16, 2026, the end of the 2025–26 USL Super League season, and are updated once a year after the conclusion of the USL Super League season.
- Players whose names are highlighted in **bold** were active players on the Fort Lauderdale United FC roster as of the list's most recent update.

Positions key
GK	Goalkeeper
DF	Defender
MF	Midfielder
FW	Forward

Nationality
Unless otherwise noted, the nationality of a player is determined by the country they most recently represented in international play, or if said player has not played international football then by their country of birth.
Position
Playing positions are listed according to the player's roster designation as of the list's most recent update.
Years
Years are defined as the first and last calendar years in which the player was rostered for the club in any of the competitions listed below.
Appearances and goals
This list counts appearances and goals in the USL Super League and USL Super League playoffs.

== Players ==
Yrs	No.	Pos	Nat	Player	Total		USL Super League		Playoffs	
Yrs	No.	Pos	Nat	Player	Apps	Goals	Apps	Goals	Apps	Goals
2025	16	FW	(England) ENG	Princess Ademiluyi	10	0	10	0	0	0
2024–2025	3	DF	(United States) USA	Sheyenne Allen	18	1	17	1	1	0
2025	28	DF	(United States) USA	Laurel Ansbrow	31	0	29	0	2	0
2025	19	MF	(United States) USA	Carlyn Baldwin	3	0	3	0	0	0
2025	9	FW	(United States) USA	Jorian Baucom	16	0	14	0	2	0
2024–2025	19	DF	(United States) USA	Cameron Brooks	17	0	17	0	0	0
2025–2026	34	MF	(United States) USA	Jules Cagle	4	0	4	0	0	0
2024–2026	7	FW	(Bermuda) BER	Nia Christopher	15	0	15	0	0	0
2025–	22	FW	(United States) USA	Kate Colvin	14	1	14	1	0	0
2025–	30	GK	(United States) USA	Haley Craig	12	0	12	0	0	0
2026	1	GK	(United States) USA	McKinley Crone	4	0	4	0	0	0
2024–2025	21	MF	(United States) USA	Tatiana Fung	21	0	19	0	2	0
2024–2025	4	DF	(United States) USA	Celia Gaynor	22	0	21	0	1	0
2025	24	DF	(United States) USA	Allie George	4	0	4	0	0	0
2024–2025	10	FW	(Brazil) BRA	Érica Gomes	6	0	6	0	0	0
2025–	21	MF	(Dominican Republic) DOM	Kat González	25	1	25	1	0	0
2024–	11	DF	(United States) USA	Sh'Nia Gordon	58	7	56	7	2	0
2024–2025	43	GK	(United States) USA	Makenna Gottschalk	5	0	5	0	0	0
2024–2025	14	FW	(United States) USA	Gianna Gourley	9	0	9	0	0	0
2025–	27	DF	(United States) USA	Julia Grosso	29	0	27	0	2	0
2024–2026	17	FW	(United States) USA	Jasmine Hamid	47	13	45	13	2	0
2025–	31	GK	(Guam) GUM	Bella Hara	13	0	13	0	0	0
2025–	9	FW	(Australia) AUS	Sophie Harding	14	0	14	0	0	0
2025–2026	33	MF	(United States) USA	Dakota Harrell	2	0	2	0	0	0
2024–2025	16	MF	(United States) USA	Anna Henderson	8	1	8	1	0	0
2024–2025	22	MF	(Iceland) ISL	Thelma Lóa Hermannsdóttir	9	0	8	0	1	0
2024	31	GK	(United States) USA	Heather Hinz	2	0	2	0	0	0
2026–	16	DF	(United States) USA	Abi Hugh	13	1	13	1	0	0
2024–2025	15	DF	(United States) USA	Adrienne Jordan	16	0	16	0	0	0
2024–2025	24	DF	(United States) USA	Reese Klein	6	1	6	1	0	0
2024–2025	8	MF	(United States) USA	Felicia Knox (Note: Knox was Fort Lauderdale United's inaugural signing, announced on May 14, 2024.)	26	1	26	1	0	0
2024–2025	6	MF	(South Africa) RSA	Anele Komani	13	0	11	0	2	0
2024–2025	2	DF	(United States) USA	Delaney Lindahl	13	0	12	0	1	0
2024–	20	FW	(United States) USA	Kiara Locklear	46	13	44	11	2	2
2026–	4	MF	(United States) USA	Allie Long	3	0	3	0	0	0
2026–	47	DF	(United States) USA	Maggie Mace	10	0	10	0	0	0
2024–2025	18	MF	(United States) USA	Addie McCain (Note: McCain scored Fort Lauderdale United's first-ever goal, which came against Spokane Zephyr FC on August 17, 2024.)	30	10	28	10	2	0
2025–	15	MF	(United States) USA	Lilly McCarthy	9	1	9	1	0	0
2025–2026	2	DF	(Australia) AUS	Madison McComasky	8	1	8	1	0	0
2024–2025	25	DF	(Canada) CAN	Sabrina McNeill	17	1	15	1	2	0
2024–2025	1	GK	(United States) USA	Cosette Morché	24	0	22	0	2	0
2026	8	MF	(United States) USA	Shea Moyer	6	0	6	0	0	0
2025	4	MF	(United States) USA	Lily Nabet	9	1	9	1	0	0
2025, 2026	8	MF	(Ghana) GHA	Stella Nyamekye	16	1	16	1	0	0
2024–2026	12	MF	(United States) USA	Darya Rajaee	39	1	37	1	2	0
2025–	18	DF	(United States) USA	Ella Simpson	23	4	23	4	0	0
2024–	23	MF	(United States) USA	Taylor Smith	54	0	52	0	2	0
2026–	10	FW	(United States) USA	Emily Thompson	7	1	7	1	0	0
2025–	35	DF	(Colombia) COL	Daniela Todd	11	0	11	0	0	0
2025–	29	MF	(United States) USA	Kelli Van Treeck	28	4	28	4	0	0
2024–	5	DF	(Tonga) TGA	Laveni Vaka	31	0	31	0	0	0
2026	40	FW	(Brazil) BRA	Alana Yasuda	1	0	1	0	0	0

== By nationality ==
In total, 52 players representing 13 different countries have appeared for Fort Lauderdale United FC.

Note: Countries indicate national team as defined under FIFA eligibility rules. Players may hold more than one non-FIFA nationality.

Country	Total players
Australia	2
Bermuda	1
Brazil	2
Canada	1
Colombia	1
Dominican Republic	1
England	1
Ghana	1
Guam	1
Iceland	1
South Africa	1
Tonga	1
United States	38

== See also ==
- List of top-division football clubs in CONCACAF countries
- List of professional sports teams in the United States and Canada
