= 2025–26 Fort Lauderdale United FC season =

2025-26 Fort Lauderdale United FC season

Fort Lauderdale United FC
2025–26 season
- President: Tyrone Mears
- General manager: Aly Hassan
- Head coach: Paul Jennison (interim)
- Stadium: Beyond Bancard Stadium
- USL Super League: 9th
- Top goalscorer: Kiara Locklear (6 goals)
- Highest home attendance: 3,750
- Lowest home attendance: 1,236
- Average home league attendance: 2,030
- Biggest win: FTL 4–1 DAL (9/13)
- Biggest defeat: LEX 5–1 FTL (10/16); FTL 0–4 DAL 2/7; DC 4–0 FTL (4/22); DAL 4–0 FTL (5/16
- All statistics correct as of 00:18, July 25, 2026 (UTC).

The 2025–26 Fort Lauderdale United FC season is the team's second season as a professional women's soccer team in the USL Super League (USLS), one of two leagues to be in the top tier of women's soccer in the United States. The club made it to the inaugural USL Super League final, earning their spot via a goal in stoppage time against Carolina Ascent FC in the semifinal. However, the club lost in extra time to the champions Tampa Bay Sun FC.

== Players and staff ==
=== Current roster ===
As of April 17, 2026

Note: Flags indicate national team as defined under FIFA eligibility rules; some limited exceptions apply. Players may hold more than one non-FIFA nationality.

No.	Pos.	Nation	Player
4	MF	USA	Allie Long
5	DF	TGA	Laveni Vaka
6	DF	USA	Molly McDougal
8	MF	USA	Shea Moyer
9	FW	AUS	Sophie Harding
10	FW	USA	Emily Thompson
11	FW	USA	Sh'Nia Gordon
15	MF	USA	Lilly McCarthy
16	DF	USA	Abi Hugh
17	FW	USA	Jasmine Hamid
18	DF	USA	Ella Simpson
19	MF	USA	Carlyn Baldwin
20	FW	USA	Kiara Locklear
21	MF	DOM	Kathrynn González
22	FW	USA	Kate Colvin

No.	Pos.	Nation	Player
23	MF	USA	Taylor Smith
27	DF	USA	Julia Grosso
29	MF	USA	Kelli Van Treeck
30	GK	USA	Haley Craig
31	GK	GUM	Bella Hara
32	FW	ARG	Mia Herrera
33	MF	USA	Dakota Harrell
34	MF	USA	Jules Cagle
35	DF	COL	Daniela Todd
36	DF	USA	Alexa Strickler
37	DF	USA	Blane McElroy
38	MF	USA	Sadie Zelnick
39	FW	SLV	Maya Buerger
40	FW	USA	Alana Yasuda
47	DF	USA	Maggie Mace

1. USL Academy Contract

=== Staff ===
As of September 16, 2025

Front office
Position	Name
Chairman & founder	Tommy Smith
President of Soccer	Tyrone Mears
General Manager	Aly Hassan
Technical staff
Head Coach	Paul Jennison (interim)
Goalkeeper Coach	Paul Jennison
Performance Coach	Tyler Raborn
Technical Coach	Ivan Arenas
Technical Coach	Rafael Quero
Head of Team Ops & Player Affairs	Emilia Ryjewski
Equipment Manager	Tannor Smoot

== Transfers ==
=== In ===
Date	Pos.	Player	Transferred from	Fee	Ref.
July 11, 2025	FW	(Australia) Sophie Harding	(Australia) Western Sydney Wanderers FC		
July 15, 2025	GK	(United States) Haley Craig	(United States) Stanford	Free	
July 18, 2025	FW	(United States) Kate Colvin	(United States) Texas A&M	Free	
July 22, 2025	MF	(Dominican Republic) Kat González	(United States) Carolina Ascent FC		
July 25, 2025	MF	(United States) Kelli Van Treeck	(United States) Lipscomb	Free	
July 29, 2025	DF	(Australia) Madison McComasky	(Australia) Western Sydney Wanderers FC		
August 4, 2025	MF	(United States) Lilly McCarthy	(United States) West Virginia	Free	
August 8, 2025	MF	(United States) Carlyn Baldwin	(Portugal) Torreense		
August 18, 2025	GK	(Guam) Bella Hara	(United States) Cal Poly	Free	
August 20, 2025	DF	(United States) Ella Simpson	(United States) Orlando Pride		
January 30, 2026	DF	(United States) Abi Hugh	(Cyprus) Apollon		
January 30, 2026	MF	(Colombia) Daniela Todd	(United States) Fort Lauderdale United Academy		
March 13, 2026	DF	(United States) Maggie Mace	(United States) Washington State		
March 25, 2026	DF	(United States) Molly McDougal	(United States) USC		
March 26, 2026	FW	(United States) Emily Thompson	(United States) UCF		
April 17, 2026	MF	(United States) Allie Long			

=== Out ===
Date	Pos.	Player	Notes	Transferred to	Fee	Ref.
July 7, 2025	MF	(United States) Addie McCain	Transfer	(United States) Lexington SC		
July 8, 2025	FW	(United States) Jorian Baucom	Released from club	(Canada) Calgary Wild FC		
July 8, 2025	DF	(United States) Cameron Brooks	Released from club	(Italy) Napoli	N/A	
July 8, 2025	MF	(United States) Tatiana Fung	Released from club	(United States) Lexington SC		
July 8, 2025	GK	(United States) Makenna Gottschalk	Released from club	(United States) DC Power FC		
July 8, 2025	FW	(United States) Anna Henderson	Released from club	(United States) Kansas City Current II	N/A	
July 8, 2025	DF	(Iceland) Thelma Hermansdottir	Released from club	(Iceland) Keflavík	N/A	
July 8, 2025	DF	(United States) Adrienne Jordan	Released from club		N/A	
July 8, 2025	MF	(South Africa) Anele Komani	Released from club		N/A	
July 8, 2025	MF	(United States) Felicia Knox	Released from club	(United States) Spokane Zephyr FC	N/A	
July 8, 2025	DF	(United States) Delaney Lindahl	Released from club		N/A	
July 8, 2025	MF	(United States) Addie McCain	Released from club	(United States) Lexington SC		
July 8, 2025	GK	(United States) Erin McKinney	Released from club	(United States) Portland Thorns FC	N/A	
July 8, 2025	DF	(Canada) Sabrina McNeill	Released from club	(United States) Tampa Bay Sun FC		
July 8, 2025	DF	(Tonga) Daviana Vaka	Released from club	(United States) Sporting Club Jacksonville	N/A	
August 23, 2025	GK	(United States) Cosette Morché	Transfer	(United States) Orlando Pride		
August 23, 2025	DF	(United States) Celia Gaynor		(Mexico) Pumas UNAM	N/A	
August 23, 2025	DF	(United States) Reese Klein		(United States) Clemson	N/A	
January 7, 2025	DF	(United States) Sheyenne Allen	Mutual Agreement	(Canada) Halifax Tides FC	N/A	
January 15, 2025	MF	(United States) Darya Rajaee	Mutual Agreement	(United States) Lexinton SC	N/A	
February 6, 2025	MF	(Bermuda) Nia Christopher	Mutual Agreement	(Iceland) FH	N/A	
March 26, 2025	DF	(Australia) Madison McComasky	Mutual Agreement		N/A	

=== Loan in ===
Pos.	Player	Loaned from	Start	End	Source
DF	(United States) Allie George	(United States) Racing Louisville FC	August 12, 2025	September 18, 2025	
DF	(United States) Laurel Ansbrow	(United States) Boston Legacy FC	August 23, 2025	December 31, 2025	
MF	(Ghana) Stella Nyamekye	(United States) Gotham FC	August 28, 2025	February 19, 2025	
FW	(England) Princess Ademiluyi	(United States) Gotham FC	September 9, 2025	January 9, 2025	
MF	(United States) Lily Nabet	(United States) Angel City FC	September 11, 2025	January 6, 2026	
GK	(United States) McKinley Crone	(United States) Orlando Pride	January 30, 2026	March 7, 2026	
MF	(United States) Shea Moyer	(United States) Lexington SC	April 4, 2026	May 16, 2026	

=== Academy contracts ===
Date	Pos.	No.	Player	Ref.
September 12, 2025	FW	32	(Argentina) Mia Herrera	
September 12, 2025	MF	33	(United States) Dakota Harrell	
September 12, 2025	MF	34	(United States) Jules Cagle	
September 12, 2025	MF	35	(Colombia) Daniela Todd	
September 12, 2025	DF	36	(United States) Alexa Strickler	
September 12, 2025	DF	37	(United States) Blane McElroy	
September 12, 2025	MF	38	(United States) Sadie Zelnick	
September 12, 2025	FW	39	(El Salvador) Maya Buerger	
May 15, 2026	FW	40	(United States) Alana Yasuda	

== Competitions ==
=== Regular season ===
==== Results summary ====
Overall								Home						Away					
Pld	W	D	L	GF	GA	GD	Pts	W	D	L	GF	GA	GD	W	D	L	GF	GA	GD
28	5	8	15	30	62	−32	23	2	5	7	21	33	−12	3	3	8	9	29	−20

Last updated: May 16, 2026.
Source: GainbridgesSuperLeague.com

==== Regular season standings ====
Pos	Team	Pld	W	L	T	GF	GA	GD	Pts
5	Spokane Zephyr	28	10	9	9	34	28	+6	39
6	DC Power	28	8	11	9	34	32	+2	33
7	Brooklyn	28	6	14	8	31	44	−13	26
8	Tampa Bay Sun	28	5	14	9	27	46	−19	24
9	Fort Lauderdale United	28	5	15	8	30	62	−32	23

Updated to match(es) played on May 16, 2026. Source: Gainbridge Super League
Rules for classification: 1) head-to-head points; 2) total goal differential; 3) total goals scored; 4) disciplinary points; 5) drawing of lots.

==== Matches ====
Win	Draw	Loss

Matchday	Date	Opponent	Venue	Location	Result (Note: Fort Lauderdale's score written first)	Scorers	Attendance	Referee	Position
1	August 23, 2025	Lexington SC	Beyond Bancard Field	Fort Lauderdale, Florida	3–3	Rajaee 12'; Locklear 57'; Hamid 90+1'	2,946	Lauren Aldrich	4th
2	August 30, 2025	Carolina Ascent FC	Beyond Bancard Field	Fort Lauderdale, Florida	2–2	Simpson 71'; Locklear 83'	1,400	Gloria Resendiz	5th
3	September 6, 2025	Spokane Zephyr FC	One Spokane Stadium	Spokane, Washington	1–0	Simpson 62'	2,185	Shawn Tehini	2nd
4	September 13, 2025	Dallas Trinity FC	Beyond Bancard Field	Fort Lauderdale, Florida	4–1	Van Treeck 16', 59'; Davison 40' o.g. Locklear 81	1,507	Iryna Petrunok	2nd
5	September 28, 2025	Brooklyn FC.	Maimonides Park	Brooklyn, Florida	2–1	Nyamekye 9'; Locklear 45+1'	1,268	Jaclyn Metz	1st
6	October 4, 2025	Tampa Bay Sun FC	Suncoast Credit Union Field	Tampa, Florida	0–0		1,468	Benjamin Meyer	1st
7	October 16, 2025	Lexington SC	Lexington SC Stadium	Lexington, Kentucky	1–5	McCarthy 81'	2,233	Rachel Swett	3rd
8	November 1, 2025	Brooklyn FC (2024)	Beyond Bancard Field	Fort Lauderdale, Florida	1–1	Van Treeck 39'	1,732	Edson Carvajal	4th
9	November 8, 2025	Carolina Ascent FC	American Legion Memorial Stadium	Charlotte, North Carolina	1–0	Hamid 71'	3,735	Jamie Padilla	2nd
10	November 12, 2025	DC Power FC	Audi Field	Washington, D.C.	1–3	Simpson 45+3'		Danielle Chesky	2nd
11	November 15, 2025	Tampa Bay Sun FC	Beyond Bancard Field	Fort Lauderdale, Florida	1–1	McComasky 90+1'	1,378	Marie Durr	2nd
12	November 22, 2025	Sporting Club Jacksonville	Hodges Stadium	Jacksonville, Florida	0-2		8,136	Elton García	3rd
13	December 13, 2025	Sporting Club Jacksonville	Hodges Stadium	Jacksonville, Florida	1–1	van Treeck 74'	7,834	Thomas Snyder	5th
14	December 20, 2025	Spokane Zephyr FC	Beyond Bancard Field	Fort Lauderdale, Florida	1–3	Locklear 74'	1,236	Danielle Chesky	6th
15	January 31, 2026	Lexington SC (women)	Beyond Bancard Field	Fort Lauderdale, Florida	1–3	Hamid 80'	1,684	John Tamayo	7th
16	February 7, 2025	Dallas Trinity FC	Beyond Bancard Field	Fort Lauderdale, Florida	0–4		1,525	Edson Carvajal	8th
17	February 14, 2026	Brooklyn FC (2024)	Beyond Bancard Field	Fort Lauderdale, Florida	3–3	Hugh 30'; Hamid 64'; Simpson 90'	2,026	Matthew Thompson	8th
18	February 21, 2026	Tampa Bay Sun FC	Suncoast Credit Union Field	Tampa, Florida	0–2		1,343	Natalie Simon	8th
19	March 14, 2026	Sporting Club Jacksonville (women)	Beyond Bancard Field	Fort Lauderdale, Florida	0–1		1,574	Laadi Issaka	8th
20	March 21, 2026	Lexington SC	Lexington SC Stadium	Lexington, Kentucky	0–1		2,389	Jamie Padilla	8th
21	March 28, 2026	Carolina Ascent FC	American Legion Memorial Stadium	Charlotte, North Carolina	1–1	González 82'	3,540	Lauren Aldrich	9th
22	April 4, 2026	DC Power FC	Beyond Bancard Field	Fort Lauderdale, Florida	3–1	Thompson 26' o.g. 61'; Colvin 68	1,865	Alejo Calume	9th
23	April 11, 2026	Sporting Club Jacksonville	Beyond Bancard Field	Fort Lauderdale, Florida	1–4	Gordon 46'	1,641	Amin Hadzic	9th
24	April 22, 2026	DC Power FC	Audi Field	Washington, D.C.	0–4		953	Marie Durr	9th
25	April 26, 2026	Spokane Zephyr FC	One Spokane Stadium	Spokane, Washington	1–3	Locklear 64'	1,594	Patricia McCracken	9th
26	May 2, 2026	Tampa Bay Sun FC	Beyond Bancard Field	Fort Lauderdale, Florida	1-2	Gordon 86'	3,000	John Tamayo	9th
27	May 9, 2025	Carolina Ascent FC	Beyond Bancard Field	Fort Lauderdale, Florida	0–3		3,750	Drew Klemp	9th
28	May 16, 2025	Dallas Trinity FC	Cotton Bowl	Dallas, Texas	0–4		5,682	Laura Rodriguez	9th

== Statistics ==
=== Appearances ===
As of match played May 16, 2026

No.	Player	Nat.	Total		Regular Season		Playoffs	
No.	Player	Nat.	Apps	Starts	Apps	Starts	Apps	Starts
Goalkeepers
30	Haley Craig	(United States)	12	11	12	11	0	0
31	Bella Hara	(Guam)	13	13	13	13	0	0
	McKinley Crone	(United States)	4	4	4	4	0	0
Defenders
5	Laveni Vaka	(Tonga)	13	12	13	12	0	0
6	Molly McDougal	(United States)	0	0	0	0	0	0
16	Abi Hugh	(United States)	15	14	15	14	0	0
18	Ella Simpson	(United States)	23	21	23	21	0	0
24	Allie George	(United States)	4	2	4	2	0	0
27	Julia Grosso	(United States)	22	19	22	19	0	0
47	Maggie Mace	(United States)	10	10	10	10	0	0
	Madison McComasky	(Australia)	8	8	8	8	0	0
	Lily Nabet	(United States)	9	8	9	8	0	0
	Laurel Ansbrow	(United States)	14	13	14	13	0	0
	Sheyenne Allen	(United States)	4	0	4	0	0	0
Midfielders
4	Allie Long	(United States)	3	0	3	0	0	0
8	Shea Moyer	(United States)	6	6	6	6	0	0
15	Lilly McCarthy	(United States)	8	0	8	0	0	0
19	Carlyn Baldwin	(United States)	3	0	3	0	0	0
21	Kat González	(Dominican Republic)	23	10	23	10	0	0
23	Taylor Smith	(United States)	25	22	25	22	0	0
29	Kelli Van Treeck	(United States)	26	23	26	23	0	0
33	Dakota Harrell	(United States)	2	0	2	0	0	0
34	Jules Cagle	(United States)	4	1	4	1	0	0
35	Daniela Todd	(Colombia)	10	2	10	2	0	0
	Stella Nyamekye	(Ghana)	14	12	14	12	0	0
	Darya Rajaee	(United States)	12	7	12	7	0	0
	Nia Christopher	(Bermuda)	2	0	2	0	0	0
Forwards
9	Sophie Harding	(Australia)	12	1	12	1	0	0
10	Emily Thompson	(United States)	7	7	7	7	0	0
11	Sh'Nia Gordon	(United States)	27	27	27	27	0	0
17	Jasmine Hamid	(United States)	17	14	17	14	0	0
20	Kiara Locklear	(United States)	27	26	27	26	0	0
22	Kate Colvin	(United States)	14	4	14	4	0	0
40	Alana Yasuda	(United States)	1	0	1	0	0	0
	Princess Ademiluyi	(England)	8	3	8	3	0	0

=== Goals ===
As of May 16, 2026

Rank	No.	Nat.	Name	Regular season	Playoffs	Total
1	20	(United States)	Kiara Locklear	6	0	6
2	17	(United States)	Jasmine Hamid	4	0	4
2	18	(United States)	Ella Simpson	4	0	4
2	29	(United States)	Kelli Van Treeck	4	0	4
5	11	(United States)	Sh'Nia Gordon	2	0	2
6	2	(Australia)	Madison McComasky	1	0	1
6	10	(United States)	Emily Thompson	1	0	1
6	15	(United States)	Lilly McCarthy	1	0	1
6	22	(United States)	Kate Colvin	1	0	1
6	16	(United States)	Abi Hugh	1	0	1
6	21	(Dominican Republic)	Kathrynn González	1	0	1
6		(Ghana)	Stella Nyamekye	1	0	1
6		(United States)	Darya Rajaee	1	0	1
Own goals				2	0	2
Total				30	0	30

=== Assists ===
As of July 22, 2026

Rank	No.	Nat.	Name	Regular Season	Playoffs	Total
1	20	(United States)	Kiara Locklear	5	0	5
2	29	(United States)	Kelli Van Treeck	2	0	2
2		(Ghana)	Stella Nyamekye	2	0	2
4	5	(Tonga)	Laveni Vaka	1	0	1
4	9	(Australia)	Sophie Harding	1	0	1
4	16	(United States)	Abi Hugh	1	0	1
4	17	(United States)	Jasmine Hamid	1	0	1
4	21	(Dominican Republic)	Kat González	1	0	1
4	23	(United States)	Taylor Smith	1	0	1
4	35	(Colombia)	Daniela Todd	1	0	1
4		(United States)	Lily Nabet	1	0	1
Total				16	0	16

=== Clean sheets ===
As of July 22, 2026

Rank	No.	Nat.	Name	Regular Season	Playoffs	Total
1	31	(Guam)	Bella Hara	3	0	3
Total				3	0	3

=== Disciplinary cards ===
Player			Regular Season			Playoffs			Total		
No.	Nat.	Name	Booked	(yellow card) (yellow-red card)	Sent off (straight red)	Booked	(yellow card) (yellow-red card)	Sent off (straight red)	Booked	(yellow card) (yellow-red card)	Sent off (straight red)
5	(Tonga)	Laveni Vaka	1	0	1	0	0	0	1	0	1
11	(United States)	Sh'Nia Gordon	5	0	0	0	0	0	5	0	0
16	(United States)	Abi Hugh	2	0	0	0	0	0	2	0	0
17	(United States)	Jasmine Hamid	3	0	0	0	0	0	3	0	0
18	(United States)	Ella Simpson	1	0	0	0	0	0	1	0	0
20	(United States)	Kiara Locklear	7	0	0	0	0	0	7	0	0
21	(Dominican Republic)	Kathrynn González	2	0	0	0	0	0	2	0	0
22	(United States)	Kate Colvin	1	0	0	0	0	0	1	0	0
23	(United States)	Taylor Smith	1	2	0	0	0	0	1	2	0
27	(United States)	Julia Grosso	1	0	0	0	0	0	1	0	0
29	(United States)	Kelli Van Treeck	4	0	0	0	0	0	4	0	0
31	(Guam)	Bella Hara	0	0	1	0	0	0	0	0	1
40	(United States)	Alana Yasuda	1	0	0	0	0	0	1	0	0
47	(United States)	Maggie Mace	2	0	0	0	0	0	2	0	0
MGR	(England)	Paul Jennison	1	0	0	0	0	0	1	0	0
	(United States)	Lily Nabet	3	0	0	0	0	0	3	0	0
	(United States)	Laurel Ansbrow	3	0	0	0	0	0	3	0	0
	(Ghana)	Stella Nyamekye	2	0	0	0	0	0	2	0	0
	(England)	Princess Ademiluyi	1	0	0	0	0	0	1	0	0
Total			41	2	2	0	0	0	41	2	2

== Awards and honors ==
=== USL Super League All-League Second Team ===
Player	Position	Ref
(United States) Kelli Van Treeck	MF	

=== Team of the month ===
Month	Player	Position	Ref
September	(United States) Kiara Locklear	FW	
September	(United States) Ella Simpson	DF	
September	(United States) Kelli Van Treeck	MF	
October	(United States) Jasmine Hamid	Bench	
November	(United States) Lily Nabet	Midfield	
November	(Australia) Madison McComasky	Bench	
December	(United States) Kelli Van Treeck (2)	Bench	
February	(United States) Jasmine Hamid (2)	Bench	
April	(United States) Kiara Locklear (2)	Bench	

=== Coach of the month ===
Month	Name	Ref
September	(United States) Alissa Rogers	
September	(England) Tyrone Mears	
