= 2025–26 USL Super League season =

USL Super League
- Season: 2025–26
- Dates: August 23, 2025 – May 16, 2026 (regular season)
- Matches: 78
- Goals: 214 (2.74 per match)
- Top goalscorer: Ashlyn Puerta; 11 goals
- Biggest home win: LEX 6–1 DAL (Sept. 26, 2025)
- Biggest away win: FTL 0–4 DAL (Feb. 7, 2026)
- Highest scoring: 7 goals: LEX 6–1 DAL (Sept. 26, 2025); CAR 3–4 JAX (Sept. 28, 2025)
- Longest winning run: 3 games: DAL; Aug. 23–Sept. 13, 2025; Nov. 15–Dec. 13, 2025; FTL; Sept. 6–Oct. 4, 2025; LEX; Oct. 16–Nov. 15, 2025; JAX; Nov. 8–Dec. 6, 2025
- Longest unbeaten run: 16 games: LEX; Aug. 23, 2025–Feb. 21, 2026
- Longest winless run: 9 games: BKN; Aug. 30–Nov. 1, 2025
- Longest losing run: 4 games: DAL; Sept. 26–Nov. 8, 2025; SPK; Oct. 30–Nov. 22, 2025
- Highest attendance: 9,783; JAX 1–3 DC (Aug. 23, 2025)
- Lowest attendance: 251; DC 0–1 JAX (Oct. 14, 2025)
- Total attendance: 331,842
- Average attendance: 2,634
- All statistics correct as of 21 February 2026.

The 2025–26 USL Super League (referred to as Gainbridge Super League for sponsorship reasons) is the second season of the USL Super League, a top division of women's soccer in the United States. Nine teams are competing in the season, which began on August 23, 2025. The league will pause between mid-December and late January for a winter break.

The reigning champions are the Tampa Bay Sun FC, and the reigning Players' Shield holders are the Carolina Ascent FC. One new team, Sporting Club Jacksonville, joined the league as an expansion franchise.

Lexington SC won their first title, defeating the Ascent 3–1 in the final.

== Teams ==
The 2025–26 USL Super League season featured nine teams competing in a 28-match unbalanced regular season, split into fall and spring schedules with a winter break. Each team faces the others three to four times, for a total of 28 matches. The top four teams advanced to the playoffs, culminating in three postseason matches to determine the league champion.

=== Stadiums and locations ===
Note: Table lists in alphabetical order.

Team	Location	Stadium	Capacity
Brooklyn FC	Brooklyn, New York	Maimonides Park	7,000
Carolina Ascent FC	Charlotte, North Carolina	American Legion Memorial Stadium	10,500
Dallas Trinity FC	Dallas, Texas	Cotton Bowl Stadium	90,000
DC Power FC	Washington, D.C.	Audi Field	20,000
Fort Lauderdale United FC	Davie, Florida	Beyond Bancard Field	7,000
Lexington SC	Lexington, Kentucky	Lexington SC Stadium	7,500
Spokane Zephyr FC	Spokane, Washington	One Spokane Stadium	5,100
Sporting Club Jacksonville	Jacksonville, Florida	Hodges Stadium	12,000
Tampa Bay Sun FC	Tampa, Florida	Suncoast Credit Union Field	5,000

Locations of teams for the 2025-26 USL Super League season
Current club

=== Personnel and kits ===
Team	Head coach	Captain(s)	Kit manufacturer	Shirt sponsor (front)	Shirt Sponsor (back)	Shirt sponsor (sleeve)
Brooklyn	(Portugal); Tomás Tengarrinha	(United States); Kelsey Hill	(United States) Diaza	Brooklyn; Children's Museum	None	None
Carolina Ascent	(England); Philip Poole	(United States); Taylor Porter	(United States) Capelli Sport	Nucor	Novant Health	Food Lion
Dallas Trinity	(England); Nathan Thackeray	(United States); Amber Wisner	(United States) Nike	Scottish Rite for Children (Home) UT Southwestern (Away)	Trust & Will (2025)	El Rio Grande; Latin Market
DC Power	(United States); Omid Namazi	(United States); Susanna Fitch	(United States) Capelli Sport	Agile Defense	None	None
Fort Lauderdale United	(England); Paul Jennison	(United States); Sh'Nia Gordon	(United States) Nike	Omega XL	Visit Lauderdale (top); La Croix (bottom)	All Year Cooling
Lexington	(Japan); Kosuke Kimura	(United States); Taylor Aylmer	(Denmark) Hummel	UK HealthCare; Sports Medicine	None	None
Spokane Zephyr	(United States); Nicole Lukic	(United States); Sarah McCoy	(United States) Capelli Sport	Davenport Hotel	Rosauers	Zappos
Sporting JAX	(England); Stacey Balaam	(United States); Sophie Jones	(Germany) Adidas	Ascension; St. Vincent's	PRI Productions (top); VyStar Credit Union (bottom)	Bomani; Espresso Martinis
Tampa Bay Sun	(Canada); Denise; Schilte-Brown	(Canada); Jordyn Listro	(United States) Capelli Sport	Tampa General Hospital	Vanguard Attorneys	Seminole Hard Rock; Hotel and Casino; Tampa

=== Managerial changes ===
Team	Outgoing manager	Manner of departure	Date of vacancy	Incoming manager	Date of appointment
Spokane Zephyr	(United States) Jo Johnson	Stepping down	May 31, 2025	(United States) Josh McAllister(interim)	June 21, 2025
Dallas Trinity	(Scotland) Pauline MacDonald	Relieved of duties	June 25, 2025	(United States) Chris Petrucelli (interim)	June 25, 2025
Lexington	(England) Sam Stockley (interim)	End of interim period	June 26, 2025	(Japan) Masaki Hemmi	July 7, 2025
DC Power	(Cameroon) Phil Nana (interim)	End of interim period	July 10, 2025	(United States) Omid Namazi	July 10, 2025
Brooklyn	(Brazil) Fabio Barros (interim)	End of interim period	August 5, 2025	(Portugal) Tomás Tengarrinha	August 5, 2025
Fort Lauderdale United	(England) Tyrone Mears (interim)	End of interim period	September 16, 2025	(United States) Ali Rogers	September 16, 2025
Spokane Zephyr	(United States) Josh McAllister (interim)	End of interim period	October 7, 2025	(United States) Nicole Lukic	October 7, 2025
Lexington	(Japan) Masaki Hemmi	Reassignment	December 9, 2025	(Japan) Kosuke Kimura	December 9, 2025
Dallas Trinity	(United States) Chris Petrucelli (interim)	End of interim period	January 20, 2026	(England) Nathan Thackeray	January 20, 2026
Fort Lauderdale United	(United States) Ali Rogers	Relieved of duties	February 10, 2026	(England) Paul Jennison (interim)	February 11, 2026

== League table ==
Pos	Team	Pld	W	L	T	GF	GA	GD	Pts	Qualification
1	Lexington (C, S)	28	14	3	11	50	24	+26	53	Playoffs
2	Sporting JAX	28	16	7	5	54	32	+22	53	Playoffs
3	Carolina Ascent	28	15	7	6	39	27	+12	51	Playoffs
4	Dallas Trinity	28	11	10	7	36	40	−4	40	Playoffs
5	Spokane Zephyr	28	10	9	9	34	28	+6	39	
6	DC Power	28	8	11	9	34	32	+2	33	
7	Brooklyn	28	6	14	8	31	44	−13	26	
8	Tampa Bay Sun	28	5	14	9	27	46	−19	24	
9	Fort Lauderdale United	28	5	15	8	30	62	−32	23	

Updated to match(es) played on May 16, 2026. Source: Gainbridge Super League
Rules for classification: 1) head-to-head points; 2) total goal differential; 3) total goals scored; 4) disciplinary points; 5) drawing of lots.
(C) Champions; (S) Players' Shield winner

== Attendance ==
=== Average home attendances ===
Ranked from highest to lowest average attendance.

Regular season
Rank	Team	GP	Attendance	High	Low	Average
1	Sporting JAX	14	104,910	9,783	1,120	7,494
2	Carolina Ascent	14	43,860	6,566	1,703	3,133
3	Dallas Trinity	14	42,698	5,682	1,527	3,050
4	Lexington	14	30,639	5,187	1,323	2,189
5	Fort Lauderdale United	14	27,264	3,750	1,236	1,947
6	Tampa Bay Sun	14	26,829	2,896	1,343	1,916
7	Spokane Zephyr	14	21,921	2,186	825	1,566
8	DC Power	14	19,404	4,842	251	1,386
9	Brooklyn	14	14,317	1,502	624	1,023
	Total	126	331,842	9,783	251	2,634

Updated through 17 May 2026 Note: Ranked from highest to lowest average attendance

=== Highest attendances ===
Regular season
Rank	Home team	Score	Away team	Attendance	Date	Stadium
1	Sporting JAX	1–3	DC Power	9,783	23 August 2025	Hodges Stadium
2	Sporting JAX	2–0	Brooklyn	8,978	4 April 2026	Hodges Stadium
3	Sporting JAX	2–1	Brooklyn	8,954	3 May 2026	Hodges Stadium
4	Sporting JAX	1–2	Lexington SC	8,744	25 April 2026	Hodges Stadium
5	Sporting JAX	1–1	Tampa Bay Sun	8,391	18 October 2025	Hodges Stadium
6	Sporting JAX	3–0	Spokane Zephyr	8,377	11 February 2026	Hodges Stadium
7	Sporting JAX	0–1	DC Power	8,358	7 February 2026	Hodges Stadium
8	Sporting JAX	3–1	Tampa Bay Sun	8,272	20 December 2025	Hodges Stadium
9	Sporting JAX	1–0	Carolina Ascent	8,247	31 January 2026	Hodges Stadium
10	Sporting JAX	2–0	Fort Lauderdale United	8,136	22 November 2025	Hodges Stadium

== Playoffs ==
The four-team playoffs consisted of single-legged semifinals and a final.

Semifinals
1	Lexington SC	2
4	Dallas Trinity	0
2	Sporting JAX	0
3	Carolina Ascent	1

Championship
1	Lexington SC	3
3	Carolina Ascent	1

=== Semi-finals ===
May 23, 2026
5:00 PM ET

Lexington SC	2–0	Dallas Trinity
Griffith 40'; Barry 51'	Report	Hintzen (yellow card) 32'

Lexington SC Stadium, Lexington, Kentucky
Attendance: 3,235
Referee: Lauren Aldrich
May 24, 2026
5:00 PM ET

Sporting JAX	0–1	Carolina Ascent
Hughes (yellow card) 90+2'	Report	George 9'; Corbin (yellow card) 45'

Hodges Stadium, Jacksonville, Florida
Attendance: 3,854
Referee: Matthew Thompson

=== Championship ===
May 30, 2026
7:00 PM EDT

Lexington SC	3–1 (a.e.t.)	Carolina Ascent
Weinert 72'; Stegleder 96'; McCain 104'	Report	Corbin 45+1'

Lexington SC Stadium, Lexington, Kentucky, U.S.
Attendance: 7,715
Referee: Shawn Tehini

== Season Statistics ==
As of 17 May 2026

=== Goals ===
Rank	Player	Club	Goals
1	(United States) Catherine Barry	Lexington	16
2	(United States) Baylee DeSmit	Sporting JAX	12
2	(United States) Ashlyn Puerta	Sporting JAX	12
4	(United States) Paige Kenton	Sporting JAX	10
4	(United States) McKenzie Weinert	Lexington	10
6	(Republic of Ireland) Rebecca Cooke	Brooklyn	9
6	(United States) Addie McCain	Lexington	9
8	(United States) Gianna Gourley	DC Power	8
9	(United States) Alyssa Walker	DC Power	7
9	(United States) Lena Silano	Spokane Zephyr	7
9	(Ethiopia) Loza Abera	DC Power	7
12	(United States) Catherine Zimmerman	Brooklyn	6
12	(United States) Kiara Locklear	Fort Lauderdale United	6
12	(United States) Sophia Boman	Sporting JAX	6
12	(United States) Sydny Nasello	Tampa Bay Sun	6
16	(United States) Ally Cook	Spokane Zephyr	5
16	(United States) Rylee Baisden	Carolina Ascent	5
16	(United States) Carlee Giammona	Tampa Bay Sun	5
16	(United States) Sealey Strawn	Dallas Trinity	5
22	(United States) Madison Mercado	Carolina Ascent	4
22	(United States) Tyler Lussi	Carolina Ascent	4
22	(United States) Tori Zierenberg	Spokane Zephyr	4
22	(United States) Dasia Torbert	DC Power	4
22	(United States) Ella Simpson	Fort Lauderdale United	4
22	(United States) Felicia Knox	Spokane Zephyr	4
22	(United States) Allie Thornton	Dallas Trinity	4
22	(United States) Camryn Lancaster	Dallas Trinity	4
22	(United States) Jasmine Hamid	Dallas Trinity	4
22	(United States) Emma Jaskaniec	Spokane Zephyr	4
22	(United States) Kelli Van Treeck	Fort Lauderdale United	4
22	(Puerto Rico) Jill Aguilera	Carolina Ascent	4
22	(United States) Sarah Griffith	Lexington	4
35	(United States) Bethany Bos	Dallas Trinity	3
35	(Puerto Rico) Jaydah Bedoya	DC Power	3
35	(United States) Sydney Studer	Carolina Ascent	3
35	(England) Jade Pennock	Sporting JAX	3
35	(United States) Shea Moyer	Lexington	3
35	(United States) Mia Corbin	Carolina Ascent	3
35	(United States) Hope Breslin	Brooklyn	3
35	(United States) Amber Wisner	Dallas Trinity	3
35	(United States) Mackenzie George	Carolina Ascent	3

==== Hat-tricks ====
Player	For	Against	Result	Date
(United States) Ashlyn Puerta	Sporting JAX	Carolina Ascent	4–3 (A)	September 28, 2025
(United States) Catherine Barry	Lexington	Tampa Bay Sun	4–0	April 18, 2026

==== Assists ====
Rank	Player	Club	Assists
1	(United States) Ashlyn Puerta	Sporting JAX	7
1	(United States) Meg Hughes	Sporting JAX	7
1	(United States) Paige Kenton	Sporting JAX	7
1	(United States) Samantha Kroeger	Brooklyn	7
1	(United States) Sophia Boman	Sporting JAX	7
6	(United States) Tatiana Fung	Lexington	5
6	(United States) Audrey Coleman	Carolina Ascent	5
6	(United States) Jessica Garziano	Brooklyn	5
6	(United States) Sarah Griffith	Lexington	5
10	(Bosnia and Herzegovina) Emina Ekić	Lexington	4
10	(United States) Emily Colton	DC Power	4
10	(Canada) Sabrina McNeill	Tampa Bay Sun	4
10	(England) Chioma Ubogagu	Dallas Trinity	4
10	(United States) Kiara Locklear	Fort Lauderdale United	4
10	(United States) Lena Silano	Spokane Zephyr	4
10	(United States) Mia Corbin	Carolina Ascent	4
10	(United States) Catherine Barry	Lexington	4
10	(United States) Taylor Aylmer	Lexington	4
19	(Brazil) Tamara Bolt	Dallas Trinity	3
19	(United States) Tori Zierenberg	Spokane Zephyr	3
19	(United States) Hannah Johnson	Lexington	3
19	(Republic of Ireland) Rebecca Cooke	Brooklyn	3
19	(Puerto Rico) Jill Aguilera	Carolina Ascent	3
19	(United States) Camryn Lancaster	Dallas Trinity	3
19	(United States) Sydny Nasello	Tampa Bay Sun	3
19	(United States) Addie McCain	Lexington	3
27	(Ghana) Stella Nyamekye	Fort Lauderdale United	2
27	(United States) Lexi Missimo	Dallas Trinity	2
27	(United States) Ally Cook	Spokane Zephyr	2
27	(United States) Cameron Tucker	Spokane Zephyr	2
27	(Brazil) Mylena Freitas	Brooklyn	2
27	(United States) Jessie Hunt	Sporting JAX	2
27	(United States) Julia Lester	Sporting JAX	2
27	(United States) Alexis Theoret	DC Power	2
27	(United States) Justina Gaynor	DC Power	2
27	(Canada) Wayny Balata	Dallas Trinity	2
27	(United States) Dasia Torbert	DC Power	2
27	(United States) Gianna Gourley	DC Power	2
27	(United States) Jilly Shimkin	Tampa Bay Sun	2
27	(United States) Ginger Fontenot	Spokane Zephyr	2
27	(United States) Baylee DeSmit	Sporting JAX	2
27	(United States) Hannah White	Lexington	2
27	(United States) Samar Guidry	Dallas Trinity	2
27	(United States) Allie Thornton	Dallas Trinity	2
27	(United States) Jasmine Hamid	Dallas Trinity	2
27	(Ethiopia) Loza Abera	DC Power	2
27	(United States) Kelli Van Treeck	Fort Lauderdale United	2
27	(United States) Sydney Cummings	DC Power	2
27	(United States) Alyssa Bourgeois	Lexington	2
27	(United States) Leah Scarpelli	Brooklyn	2
27	(United States) Allison Pantuso	Lexington	2
27	(United States) Cyera Hintzen	Dallas Trinity	2
27	(United States) Mackenzie George	Carolina Ascent	2

=== Clean sheets ===
Rank	Player	Club	Clean Sheets
1	(United States) Kat Asman	Lexington	11
2	(United States) Kaitlyn Parks	Sporting JAX	10
2	(United States) Hope Hisey	Spokane Zephyr	10
4	(Puerto Rico) Sydney Martinez	Carolina Ascent	7
5	(Canada) Rylee Foster	Dallas Trinity	4
5	(Australia) Morgan Aquino	DC Power	4
7	(Guam) Bella Hara	Fort Lauderdale United	3
7	(United States) Meagan McClelland	Carolina Ascent	3
7	(United States) Kelsey Daugherty	Brooklyn	3
7	(United States) Tyler McCamey	Dallas Trinity	3
11	(United States) Makenna Gottschalk	DC Power	2
11	(United States) Breanna Norris	Brooklyn	2
11	(United States) Emory Wegener	Tampa Bay Sun	2
11	(Jamaica) Sydney Schneider	Tampa Bay Sun	2
14	(United States) Sara Wojdelko	DC Power	1
14	(Germany) Jamie Gerstenberg	Sporting JAX	1

=== Discipline ===
==== Player ====
- Most yellow cards: 9
  - (Canada) Jordyn Listro
- Most red cards: 2
  - (United States) Taylor Smith

==== Team ====
- Most yellow cards: 62
  - Brooklyn
- Fewest yellow cards: 24
  - DC Power
- Most red cards: 4
  - Fort Lauderdale United
- Fewest red cards: 0
  - DC Power

== Awards ==
=== Monthly awards ===
Month	Manager of the Month		Player of the Month		Goal of the Month		Save of the Month		Ref.
Month	Manager	Club	Player	Club	Player	Club	Player	Club	Ref.
September	(England); Tyrone Mears (United States); Alissa Rogers	Fort Lauderdale United	(United States); Ashlyn Puerta	Sporting JAX	(United States); Emma Jaskaniec	Spokane Zephyr	(United States); Hope Hisey	Spokane Zephyr	
October	(England); Phillip Poole	Carolina Ascent	(United States); Audrey Harding	Carolina Ascent	(United States); Sarah; Griffith	Lexington	(United States); Kaitlyn Parks	Sporting JAX	
November	(Japan); Masaki Hemmi	Lexington	(United States); Paige Kenton	Sporting JAX	(United States); McKenzie Weinert	Lexington	(Guam); Bella Hara	Fort Lauderdale United	
December	(England); Stacey Balaam	Sporting JAX	(England); Chioma Ubogagu	Dallas Trinity	(England); Chioma Ubogagu	Dallas Trinity	(United States); Rylee Foster	Dallas Trinity	
February	(England); Stacey Balaam	Sporting JAX	(United States); Kaitlyn Parks	Sporting JAX	(United States); Felicia Knox	Spokane Zephyr	(United States); Emory Wegener	Tampa Bay Sun	
March	(England); Phillip Poole	Carolina Ascent	(United States); Tyler Lussi	Carolina Ascent	(United States); Faith Webber	Tampa Bay Sun	(United States); Haley Craig	Fort Lauderdale United	
April	(England); Phillip Poole	Carolina Ascent	(United States); Catherine Barry	Lexington					

=== Team of the Month ===
Month	Goalkeeper	Defenders	Midfielders	Forwards	Bench	Ref.
September	(United States) Hope Hisey, SPK	(United States) Kelsey Hill, BKN; (United States) Ella Simpson, FTL; (United States) Sarah McCoy, SPK	(United States) Amber Wisner, DAL; (United States) Addie McCain, LEX; (United States) Alexis Theoret, DC; (United States) Kelli Van Treeck, FTL	(United States) Catherine Barry, LEX; (United States) Ashlyn Puerta, JAX; (United States) Kiara Locklear, FTL	(Guyana) Sydney Cummings, DC (United States) Julia Lester, JAX (United States) Sydny Nasello, TB (United States) Gianna Gourley, DC (United States) Maddie Mercado, CAR (United States) Sealey Strawn, DAL (United States) Kat Asman, LEX	
October	(United States) Hope Hisey, SPK (2)	(Puerto Rico) Jill Aguilera, CAR; (United States) Sydney Studer, CAR; (United States) Hannah Sharts, LEX; (United States) Reese Tappan, SPK	(United States) Alexis Theoret, DC (2); (United States) Sydny Nasello, TB (2); (United States) Ashlyn Puerta, JAX (2)	(United States) Audrey Harding, CAR; (United States) Sarah Griffith, LEX; (Republic of Ireland) Rebecca Cooke, BKN	(United States) Leah Scarpelli, BKN; (Scotland) Georgia Brown, JAX; (United States) Addie McCain, LEX (2); (United States) Jasmine Hamid, FTL; (United States) Ally Cook, SPK; (United States) Paige Kenton, JAX; (United States) Kat Asman, LEX	
November	(United States) Kaitlyn Parks, JAX	(Canada) Sabrina McNeill, TB; (Scotland) Georgia Brown, JAX (2); (United States) Jenna Butler, CAR; (United States) Susanna Fitch, DC	(United States) Samantha Kroeger, BKN; (United States) Lily Nabet, FTL; (United States) Taylor Aylmer, LEX	(United States) Rhea Moore, DAL; (United States) McKenzie Weinert, LEX; (United States) Paige Kenton, JAX (2)	(Australia) Madison McComasky, FTL; (Canada) Vivianne Bessette, TB; (United States) Emma Jaskaniec, SPK; (Republic of Ireland) Rebecca Cooke, BKN (2); (United States) Rylee Baisden, CAR; (United States) Gianna Gourley, DC (2); (Jamaica) Sydney Schneider, TB	
December	(United States) Rylee Foster, DAL	(United States) Sydney Studer, CAR (2); (United States) Allison Pantuso, LEX; (Scotland) Georgia Brown, JAX (3)	(England) Chioma Ubogagu, DAL; (United States) Emily Colton, DC; (United States) Emma Jaskaniec, SPK; (United States) Sophia Boman, JAX	(United States) Gianna Gourley, DC (3); (United States) Lena Silano, SPK; (United States) Paige Kenton, JAX (3)	(United States) Kelli Van Treeck, FTL (2); (Ghana) Jennifer Cudjoe, BKN; (United States) Taylor Aylmer, LEX (2); (Switzerland) Sandrine Gaillard, TB; (United States) Catherine Zimmerman, BKN; (United States) Allie Thornton, DAL; (United States) Meagan McClelland, CAR	
February	(United States) Kaitlyn Parks, JAX (2)	(United States) Allison Pantuso, LEX; (Scotland) Georgia Brown, JAX (4); (United States) Sydney Studer, CAR (3); (United States) Amber Wisner, DAL (2)	(Argentina) Sophia Braun, SPK; (Canada) Wayny Balata, DAL; (United States) Ashlyn Puerta, JAX (3)	(United States) Sydny Nasello, TB (3); (United States) Lena Silano, SPK (2); (United States) Catherine Barry, LEX (2)	(Australia) Morgan Aquino, DC; (United States) McKenzie Weinert, LEX (2); (United States) Jasmine Hamid, FTL (2); (United States) Baylee DeSmit, JAX; (United States) Emily Colton, DC (2); (United States) Samantha Kroeger, BKN (2); (Canada) Sabrina McNeill, TB (2)	
March	(Puerto Rico) Sydney Martinez, CAR	(United States) Taylor Chism, TB; (United States) Maggie Illig, JAX; (United States) Ginger Fontenot, SPK; (United States) Regan Steigleder, LEX	(United States) Heather Stainbrook, DAL; (United States) Sophia Boman, JAX (2); (United States) Darya Rajaee, LEX	(United States) Tyler Lussi, CAR; (Ethiopia) Loza Abera, DC; (United States) Faith Webber, TB	(United States) Kaitlyn Parks, JAX (3); (United States) Tori Zierenberg, SPK; (United States) Catherine Barry, LEX (3); (United States) Mia Corbin, CAR; (United States) Amber Wisner, DAL (3); (United States) Emily Colton, DC (3); (United States) Jenna Butler, CAR (2)	
April	(Puerto Rico) Sydney Martinez, CAR (2)	(Puerto Rico) Jill Aguilera, CAR (2); (United States) Amber Wisner, DAL (4); (United States) Alyssa Bourgeois, LEX; (United States) Grace Phillpotts, JAX	(United States) Sophia Boman, JAX (3); (United States) Emma Jaskaniec, SPK (3); (United States) Samantha Kroeger, BKN (3)	(United States) Emily Colton, DC (4); (United States) Catherine Barry, LEX (4); (Ethiopia) Loza Abera, DC (2)	(United States) Kat Asman, LEX (2); (United States) Jenna Butler, CAR (2); (United States) Justina Gaynor, DC; (United States) McKenzie Weinert, LEX (3); (United States) Baylee DeSmit, JAX (2); (United States) Tori Zierenberg, SPK (2); (United States) Kiara Locklear, FTL (2)	

== Media ==
All regular-season games and three playoff matches will stream on Peacock. Select matches are simulcast on the free NBC Sports NOW FAST channel.

Locally, games are aired on the following networks:

Team	Network	Notes/Source
Brooklyn FC (Since 2024–25 season)	SNY	
Sporting Club Jacksonville (Since 2025–26 season)	WJXT; WTLV; WJXX; WJXX-DT2	Seven matches on WJXT, four matches on WTLV, one each on WJXX and WJXX-DT2
Fort Lauderdale United FC (Since 2025–26 season)	WPLG	
Carolina Ascent (Since 2024–25 season)	WAXN-TV/WSOC-DT2	All games selected for television air in English or WAXN, select games air in Spanish on WSOC-DT2.
