= Paul Jennison =

English football manager

Personal information
- Position: Goalkeeper

Team information
- Current team: Fort Lauderdale United (interim)

College career
| Years | Team | Apps | (Gls) |
| 2003–2004 | Parkland Cobras | | |
| 2005–2007 | Eastern Illinois Panthers | | |

Managerial career
- 2017–2019: Northwestern Wildcats (women's assistant)
- 2020: Saint Mary's Cardinals (women's)
- 2023: British Virgin Islands (men's goalkeeping coach)
- 2024–2025: South Carolina Gamecocks (men's assistant)
- 2025–2026: Fort Lauderdale United (goalkeeping coach)
- 2026: Fort Lauderdale United (interim)
- 2026: Fort Lauderdale United (goalkeeping coach)
- 2026–: Fort Lauderdale United (interim)

Paul Jennison is an English professional football manager who currently serves as the interim head coach USL Super League club Fort Lauderdale United FC. A former goalkeeper, Jennison played college soccer for the Parkland Cobras and the Eastern Illinois Panthers. He has previously served on the coaching staff of the Northwestern Wildcats women's team, the British Virgin Islands men's national team, and the South Carolina Gamecocks men's team, in addition to as the head coach of the Saint Mary's Cardinals women's team.

== College career ==
Jennison moved from England to the United States in 2003 to play college soccer. He started off with two seasons as a member of the Parkland Cobras, winning multiple accolades. He then transferred to Eastern Illinois University, where he played three seasons of NCAA Division I soccer for the Panthers.

== Managerial career ==
=== Early career ===
After graduating from college, Jennison eventually ended up working as a wellness teacher at St. Charles East High School in St. Charles, Illinois. He also coached both the high school's boys and girls varsity soccer teams. Jennison led the boys team to four conference titles, three regional titles, and one Illinois state quarterfinal appearance. He also led the girls team to four consecutive regional championships and a state runners-up finish in 2014. The Kane County Chronicle recognized Jennison as its Men's Coach of the Year award in 2009 and 2012, and then for its Women's Coach of the Year award in 2014 after the girls team's second-place state campaign.

Also in 2014, Jennison joined local youth team Campton United SC as the Director of Goalkeeping. Two years later, he was hired under the same title for the Illinois Olympic Development Program. Jennison has also worked at the United States Soccer Federation's training centers, starting his employment there in 2015.

In 2017, Jennison was hired as an assistant coach for the Northwestern Wildcats women's soccer team. He spent three seasons at Northwestern and helped the program make it to the NCAA tournament in two of his three years there. In January 2020, the Saint Mary's Cardinals women's soccer program announced that they had hired Jennison as head coach. After one season at Saint Mary's, Jennison departed and spent the next four years as Head of Goalkeeping at the IMG Academy, a multi-sport school based in Bradenton, Florida.

Jennison spent part of 2023 as British Virgin Islands men's national team's goalkeeping coach. On June 13, 2024, he was announced as a new assistant coach for the South Carolina Gamecocks men's team, a post he would hold until the following year.

=== Fort Lauderdale United ===
Jennison was hired to his first coaching job at a professional club team in 2025, joining USL Super League club Fort Lauderdale United FC ahead of the league's second season of play. He began the 2025–26 season as both the club's goalkeeping coach and head assistant coach. On February 11, 2026, Fort Lauderdale United announced the firing of head coach Ali Rogers after a stretch of poor form that included 3 successive home losses. Jennison was subsequently elevated to the role of interim head coach for Fort Lauderdale's remaining 12 games of the season. In his first game at the helm, he led the team in a 3–3 draw with Brooklyn FC. However, Jennison was not able to lead the team to any victories, piloting Fort Lauderdale to a last-place finish after losing the last seven consecutive matches of the season.

At the conclusion of the campaign, Jennison was moved back to an goalkeeping coaching position as Tyrone Mears was re-hired as main head coach. However, in October 2026, Mears was removed from his position, and Jennison was once again elevated to the role of interim coach.

== Personal life ==
Jennison is a native of Middlesbrough. He graduated from Eastern Illinois University in 2007 with a bachelor's degree in physical education. In 2014, he received a master's degree in kinesiology from Georgia Southern University. Jennison has a wife, Lauren, and two daughters.
