= 2024–25 Western Sydney Wanderers FC (women) season =

13th season in existence of Western Sydney Wanderers FC (women)

Western Sydney Wanderers
2024–25 season
- Owner: Paul Lederer, Jefferson Cheng, Glenn Duncan
- Chairman: Paul Lederer
- Manager: Robbie Hooker (until 7 January 2025); Geoff Abrahams (from 7 January 2025)
- Stadium: CommBank Stadium; Wanderers Football Park
- A-League Women: 12th
- Top goalscorer: Sienna Saveska (7)
- Highest home attendance: 2,225 vs. Western United (14 December 2024); A-League Women
- Lowest home attendance: 472 vs. Adelaide United (10 November 2024); A-League Women
- Average home league attendance: 1,349
- Biggest win: 5–1 vs. Western United (H) (14 December 2024); A-League Women
- Biggest defeat: 0–4 vs. Brisbane Roar (N) (22 November 2024); A-League Women
Home colours	Away colours
- All statistics correct as of 15 December 2024.

The 2024–25 season was the 13th in the history of Western Sydney Wanderers (A-League Women).

== Players ==
=== First-team squad ===
As of 6 April 2025

Note: Flags indicate national team as defined under FIFA eligibility rules; some limited exceptions apply. Players may hold more than one non-FIFA nationality.

No.	Pos.	Nation	Player
2	DF	AUS	Paige Hayward
3	DF	AUS	Gemma Ferris
4	DF	AUS	Madison McComasky
5	MF	AUS	Milly Bennett (scholarship)
6	MF	AUS	Amy Chessari (scholarship)
7	MF	AUS	Amy Harrison (captain)
8	MF	AUS	Olivia Price
9	FW	AUS	Sophie Harding
10	MF	AUS	Sienna Saveska
11	DF	AUS	Danika Matos
12	FW	AUS	Bronte Trew (scholarship)
13	FW	AUS	Talia Kapetanellis
14	DF	AUS	Ella Buchanan

No.	Pos.	Nation	Player
15	DF	AUS	Cushla Rue
16	FW	AUS	Anika Stajcic
17	FW	AUS	Amelia Cassar (scholarship)
18	GK	AUS	Aimee Hall
19	MF	AUS	Talia Younis
20	GK	AUS	Sham Khamis
23	DF	AUS	Maya Lobo (scholarship)
24	FW	JPN	Aya Seino
25	FW	AUS	Holly Caspers
26	MF	POR	Siena Arrarte (scholarship)
31	GK	AUS	Keely Segavcic
37	MF	JPN	Ena Harada

== Transfers ==
=== Transfers in ===
No.	Position	Player	From	Type/fee	Contract length	Date	Ref
5	MF	Milly Bennett	(Australia) Football NSW Institute	Free transfer	1 year (scholarship)	11 September 2024	
17	FW	Amelia Cassar	(Australia) Football NSW Institute	Free transfer	1 year (scholarship)	13 September 2024	
10	MF	Sienna Saveska	Sydney FC	Free transfer	1 year	11 October 2024	
13	FW	Talia Kapetanellis	(Australia) Sydney University	Free transfer	1 year	14 October 2024	
2	DF	Paige Hayward	Unattached	Free transfer	1 year	29 October 2024	
37	MF	(Japan) Ena Harada	(Australia) Bankstown City	Free transfer	1 year	30 October 2024	
12	FW	Bronte Trew	(Australia) Macarthur Rams	Free transfer	1 year (scholarship)	31 October 2024	
18	GK	Aimee Hall	(Australia) Illawarra Stingrays	Free transfer		31 October 2024	
23	DF	Maya Lobo	Unattached	Free transfer	1 year (scholarship)	31 October 2024	
24	FW	(Japan) Aya Seino	Unattached	Free transfer		31 October 2024	
26	MF	(Portugal) Siena Arrarte	Unattached	Free transfer	1 year (scholarship)	31 October 2024	
16	FW	Anika Stajcic	(Australia) Football NSW Institute	Free transfer		1 February 2025	

=== Transfers out ===
No.	Position	Player	Transferred to	Type/fee	Date	Ref
1	GK	(United States) Kaylie Collins	(United States) Orlando Pride	End of loan	16 April 2024	
2	DF	(United States) Vicky Bruce	(United States) Carolina Ascent	End of contract	1 May 2024	
21	MF	Alexia Apostolakis	Melbourne City	End of contract	1 July 2024	
16	MF	Ischia Brooking	Unattached	Mutual contract termination	12 July 2024	
18	FW	(United States) Maliah Morris	Unattached	End of contract	12 July 2024	
23	FW	Ella Abdul Massih	Unattached	Mutual contract termination	6 August 2024	
10	MF	Melissa Caceres	TBA	End of contract	29 August 2024	
17	FW	India Breier	Newcastle Jets	Mutual contract termination	29 August 2024	
32	MF	Bethany Gordon	Canberra United	End of contract	29 August 2024	
5	DF	Lauren Keir	Retired		20 September 2024	

=== Contract extensions ===
No.	Player	Position	Duration	Date	Ref.
25	Holly Caspers	Forward	2 years	15 March 2024	
15	Cushla Rue	Defender	2 years	22 March 2024	
11	Danika Matos	Defender	2 years	19 April 2024	
8	Olivia Price	Midfielder	2 years	29 April 2024	
9	Sophie Harding	Forward	2 years	23 May 2024	
3	Gemma Ferris	Defender	1 year	13 June 2024	
14	Ella Buchanan	Defender	2 years	19 July 2024	
7	Amy Harrison	Midfielder	2 years	22 July 2024	
19	Talia Younis	Midfielder	1 year	21 August 2024	
20	Sham Khamis	Goalkeeper		31 October 2024	

== Pre-season and friendlies ==
5 October 2024	Western Sydney Wanderers	1–1	(Australia) Newcastle Jets	Sydney, Australia
16:00 AEST	Harding	Report	Hammond	Stadium: Wanderers Football Park
Note: Match consisted of 3 45-minute periods

== Competitions ==
=== Overall record ===
Competition	First match	Last match	Final position	Record							
Competition	First match	Last match	Final position	Pld	W	D	L	GF	GA	GD	Win %
A-League Women	3 November 2024	20 April 2025	12th	23	4	4	15	28	46	−18	17.39
Total				23	4	4	15	28	46	−18	17.39

Last updated: 19 April 2025
Source: Competitions

=== A-League Women ===
==== League table ====
Pos	Team	Pld	W	D	L	GF	GA	GD	Pts
8	Sydney FC	23	7	4	12	23	29	−6	25
9	Wellington Phoenix (Note: Wellington Phoenix cannot qualify for the AFC Women's Champions League as they are based in New Zealand, which is part of the Oceania Football Confederation.)	23	7	3	13	25	30	−5	24
10	Perth Glory	23	6	4	13	27	43	−16	22
11	Newcastle Jets	23	5	5	13	29	53	−24	20
12	Western Sydney Wanderers	23	4	4	15	28	46	−18	16

Source: A-Leagues
Rules for classification: 1) points; 2) goal difference; 3) goals scored; 4) wins; 5) head-to-head results; 5a) head-to-head points; 5b) head-to-head goal difference; 6) Fair Play points; 7) away goal difference; 8) away goals per match; 9) home goal difference; 10) home goals per match; 11) toss of a coin in an event of a tie of two clubs.

==== Matches ====
Win Draw Loss

All times are in local time (AEST/AEDT).

3 November 2024 1	Newcastle Jets	2–2	Western Sydney Wanderers	Cessnock
16:00	Jackson 45+4'; L. Allan 61'	Report	Harding 4'; Saveska 27'	Stadium: Cessnock Sportsground (Note: Originally the match was scheduled to take place at No.2 Sportsground, but the venue was changed due to the ground being unavailable.); Attendance: 2,858; Referee: Bec Mackie

10 November 2024 2	Western Sydney Wanderers	0–2	Adelaide United	Sydney
15:00		Report	Worts 46'; Condon 51'	Stadium: CommBank Stadium; Attendance: 472; Referee: Caitlin Williams

16 November 2024 3	Sydney FC	1–0	Western Sydney Wanderers	Sydney
14:15	Tallon-Henniker 86'	Report		Stadium: Leichhardt Oval; Attendance: 3,324; Referee: Isabella Mossin

22 November 2024 4	Western Sydney Wanderers	0–4	Brisbane Roar	Sydney
20:15		Report	Hayashi 18', 45+1'; Yallop 67'; Pringle 84'	Stadium: Netstrata Jubilee Stadium (Note: Match moved from Leichhardt Oval following a pitch assessment.); Attendance: 1,398; Referee: Kelly Jones

30 November 2024 5	Melbourne City	2–0	Western Sydney Wanderers	Melbourne
14:15	Speckmaier 42'; Apostolakis 90+4'	Report		Stadium: AAMI Park; Attendance: 2,097; Referee: Caitlin Williams

14 December 2024 6	Western Sydney Wanderers	5–1	Western United	Sydney
16:50	Saveska 10', 24', 27'; Rue 38'; Matos 82'	Report	Logarzo 64' (pen.)	Stadium: CommBank Stadium; Attendance: 2,225; Referee: Casey Reibelt

20 December 2024 7	Western Sydney Wanderers	1–1	Perth Glory	Sydney
19:00	Harrison 85'	Report	Brown 90+6' (pen.)	Stadium: Wanderers Football Park; Attendance: 862; Referee: Rachael Mitchenson

27 December 2024 8	Adelaide United	1–0	Western Sydney Wanderers	Adelaide
16:50	Healy 68'	Report		Stadium: Coopers Stadium; Attendance: 3,809; Referee: Isabella Mossin

5 January 2025 10	Melbourne Victory	4–4	Western Sydney Wanderers	Melbourne
17:00	Bunge 45'; Wilson 51'; Ferris 77' (o.g.); Chidiac 87'	Report	Harding 4', 90+2'; Saveska 54'; Kapetanellis 89'	Stadium: The Home of the Matildas; Attendance: 725; Referee: Caitlin Williams

9 January 2025 9	Western Sydney Wanderers	0–3	Wellington Phoenix	Sydney
19:00		Report	Whinham 46'; Kelly 59'; Main 83'	Stadium: Wanderers Football Park; Attendance: 425; Referee: Isabella Mossin

12 January 2025 11	Western Sydney Wanderers	1–3	Central Coast Mariners	Sydney
17:00	Price 90+3'	Report	Nunn 10'; Quilligan 23'; Galic 69' (pen.)	Stadium: Wanderers Football Park; Attendance: 892; Referee: Sarah Jones

18 January 2025 12	Canberra United	1–0	Western Sydney Wanderers	Canberra
17:00	Khamis 45' (o.g.)	Report		Stadium: McKellar Park; Attendance: 1,468; Referee: Mikayla Ryan

25 January 2025 13	Western Sydney Wanderers	0–1	Melbourne City	Sydney
17:00		Report	McNamara 14'	Stadium: Wanderers Football Park; Attendance: 634; Referee: Bec Mackie

31 January 2025 14	Western United	4–1	Western Sydney Wanderers	Melbourne
19:00	Logarzo 3' (pen.); M. Taranto 7'; Eggesvik 35'; De Domizio 79'	Report	Saveska 39'	Stadium: Ironbark Fields; Attendance: 507; Referee: Izzy Cooper

9 February 2025 15	Western Sydney Wanderers	2–1	Brisbane Roar	Sydney
17:00	Saveska 7'; Caspers 88'	Report	Kruger 67'	Stadium: Wanderers Football Park; Attendance: 729; Referee: Georgia Ghirardello

14 February 2025 16	Western Sydney Wanderers	4–1	Newcastle Jets	Sydney
19:00	Trew 28'; Harada 39'; Harrison 74' (pen.); Caspers 88'	Report	Prior 7'	Stadium: Wanderers Football Park; Attendance: 925; Referee: Kelly Jones

28 February 2025 17	Central Coast Mariners	1–2	Western Sydney Wanderers	Gosford
16:50	Gomez 68'	Report	Price 80'; Caspers 90+3'	Stadium: Industree Group Stadium; Attendance: 1,346; Referee: Isabella Mossin

9 March 2025 18	Wellington Phoenix	2–1	Western Sydney Wanderers	Wellington
14:00	Tanaka 75'; Fergusson 86'	Report	Trew 22'	Stadium: Porirua Park; Attendance: 678; Referee: Isabella Mossin

22 March 2025 20	Perth Glory	1–0	Western Sydney Wanderers	Perth
20:00	Foletta 90+1'	Report		Stadium: Sam Kerr Football Centre; Attendance: 996; Referee: Bec Mackie

28 March 2025 21	Western Sydney Wanderers	0–2	Sydney FC	Sydney
19:00		Report	Hawkesby 48' (pen.); dos Santos 64'	Stadium: Marconi Stadium; Attendance: 1,409; Referee: Page Malau-Aduli

6 April 2025 19	Western Sydney Wanderers	0–1	Melbourne Victory	Sydney
17:00		Report	Matos 18' (o.g.)	Stadium: Wanderers Football Park; Attendance: 568; Referee: Molly Godsell
Note: Was originally scheduled to take place on 15 March at CommBank Stadium, but was postponed due to heat policy and rescheduled for 6 April at Wanderers Football Park.

13 April 2025 22	Brisbane Roar	4–4	Western Sydney Wanderers	Brisbane
15:00	Yallop 16', 29', 85'; Hayashi 68'	Report	Trew 37'; Caspers 73'; McComasky 85'; Harding 90+2'	Stadium: Perry Park; Attendance: 2,355; Referee: Molly Godsell

19 April 2025 23	Western Sydney Wanderers	1–3	Canberra United	Sydney
16:50	Trew 64'	Report	Malone 25'; Gordon 50'; Nathan 78'	Stadium: CommBank Stadium; Attendance: 2,958; Referee: Kelly Jones
Note: Was originally scheduled to take place on 20 April at Wanderers Football Park, but due to other changes was rescheduled for 19 April at CommBank Stadium.

== Statistics ==
=== Appearances and goals ===
Includes all competitions. Players with no appearances not included in the list.

As of match played 19 April 2025

No.	Pos	Nat	Player	Total		A-League Women	
No.	Pos	Nat	Player	Apps	Goals	Apps	Goals
2	DF	(Australia) AUS	Paige Hayward	5	0	5	0
3	DF	(Australia) AUS	Gemma Ferris	10	0	6+4	0
4	DF	(Australia) AUS	Madison McComasky	12	1	12	1
5	MF	(Australia) AUS	Milly Bennett	16	0	6+10	0
6	MF	(Australia) AUS	Amy Chessari	22	0	22	0
7	MF	(Australia) AUS	Amy Harrison	23	2	23	2
8	MF	(Australia) AUS	Olivia Price	22	2	16+6	2
9	FW	(Australia) AUS	Sophie Harding	19	4	12+7	4
10	MF	(Australia) AUS	Sienna Saveska	22	7	19+3	7
11	DF	(Australia) AUS	Danika Matos	23	1	23	1
12	FW	(Australia) AUS	Bronte Trew	19	4	7+12	4
13	FW	(Australia) AUS	Talia Kapetanellis	16	1	0+16	1
14	DF	(Australia) AUS	Ella Buchanan	19	0	18+1	0
15	DF	(Australia) AUS	Cushla Rue	23	1	21+2	1
16	FW	(Australia) AUS	Anika Stajčić	1	0	0+1	0
17	FW	(Australia) AUS	Amelia Cassar	4	0	0+4	0
18	GK	(Australia) AUS	Aimee Hall	2	0	1+1	0
19	MF	(Australia) AUS	Talia Younis	22	0	16+6	0
20	GK	(Australia) AUS	Sham Khamis	21	0	21	0
23	DF	(Australia) AUS	Maya Lobo	4	0	2+2	0
25	FW	(Australia) AUS	Holly Caspers	10	4	3+7	4
31	GK	(Australia) AUS	Keely Segavcic	2	0	1+1	0
37	MF	(Japan) JPN	Ena Harada	22	1	19+3	1
