= 2023–24 Western Sydney Wanderers FC (women) season =

12th season in existence of Western Sydney Wanderers FC (women)

Western Sydney Wanderers
2023–24 season
- Owner: Paul Lederer, Jefferson Cheng, Glenn Duncan
- Chairman: Paul Lederer
- Manager: Robbie Hooker
- Stadium: CommBank Stadium; Wanderers Football Park
- A-League Women: 7th
- A-League Women Finals: DNQ
- Top goalscorer: Sophie Harding (12)
- Highest home attendance: 9,577 vs. Sydney FC (2 March 2024); A-League Women
- Lowest home attendance: 376 vs. Canberra United (13 March 2024); A-League Women
- Average home league attendance: 2,060
- Biggest win: 3–0 vs. Central Coast Mariners (H) (8 December 2023); A-League Women; 4–1 vs. Canberra United (H) (13 March 2024); A-League Women
- Biggest defeat: 0–4 vs. Melbourne Victory (A) (16 February 2024); A-League Women
Home colours	Away colours
- All statistics correct as of 30 March 2024.

The 2023–24 season was the 12th in the history of Western Sydney Wanderers (A-League Women).

== Players ==
=== First-team squad ===
As of 22 February 2024

Note: Flags indicate national team as defined under FIFA eligibility rules; some limited exceptions apply. Players may hold more than one non-FIFA nationality.

No.	Pos.	Nation	Player
1	GK	USA	Kaylie Collins (on loan from Orlando Pride)
2	DF	USA	Vicky Bruce
3	DF	AUS	Gemma Ferris
4	DF	AUS	Madison McComasky
5	DF	AUS	Lauren Keir
6	MF	AUS	Amy Chessari (scholarship)
7	MF	AUS	Amy Harrison (captain)
8	MF	AUS	Olivia Price
9	FW	AUS	Sophie Harding
10	MF	AUS	Melissa Caceres
11	MF	AUS	Danika Matos
14	DF	AUS	Ella Buchanan (injury replacement)

No.	Pos.	Nation	Player
15	DF	AUS	Cushla Rue
16	MF	AUS	Ischia Brooking (scholarship)
17	FW	AUS	India Breier
18	FW	USA	Maliah Morris
19	MF	AUS	Talia Younis (scholarship)
20	GK	AUS	Sham Khamis
21	MF	AUS	Alexia Apostolakis
23	DF	AUS	Ella Abdul Massih
25	MF	AUS	Holly Caspers
31	GK	AUS	Keely Segavcic
32	MF	AUS	Bethany Gordon
—	MF	AUS	Angelique Hristodoulou

== Transfers ==
=== Transfers in ===
No.	Position	Player	Transferred from	Type/fee	Contract length	Date	Ref.
19	MF	Talia Younis	Unattached	Free transfer	1 year (scholarship)	6 July 2023	
14	FW	(New Zealand) Milly Clegg	Wellington Phoenix	Free transfer	1 year	11 July 2023	
4	DF	Madison McComasky	Canberra United	Free transfer	2 years	24 July 2023	
17	FW	India Breier	(Australia) Macarthur Rams	Free transfer	2 years	31 August 2023	
2	DF	(United States) Vicky Bruce	(England) Bristol City	Free transfer	1 year	4 September 2023	
1	GK	(United States) Kaylie Collins	(United States) Orlando Pride	Loan	1 year	13 September 2023	
16	MF	Ischia Brooking	(Australia) Football West NTC	Free transfer	2 years (scholarship)	25 September 2023	
18	FW	(United States) Maliah Morris	(United States) Orlando Pride	Free transfer	1 year	3 October 2023	
31	GK	Keely Segavcic	Canberra United	Free transfer		11 October 2023	
14	DF	Ella Buchanan	(Australia) NWS Spirit	Injury replacement	4 months	22 February 2024	

=== Transfers out ===
No.	Position	Player	Transferred to	Type/fee	Date	Ref.
17	FW	Sheridan Gallagher	Unattached	Mutual contract termination	4 April 2023	
30	GK	Teresa Morrissey	(Australia) Macarthur Rams	End of contract	20 May 2023	
10	MF	Sienna Saveska	Sydney FC	Free transfer	25 August 2023	
16	MF	(New Zealand) Malia Steinmetz	(Denmark) Nordsjælland	End of contract	29 August 2023	
14	DF	Clare Hunt	(France) Paris Saint-Germain	End of contract	15 September 2023	
13	MF	(Czech Republic) Jitka Chlastáková	Unattached	End of contract	11 October 2023	
19	FW	(Philippines) Sarina Bolden	Unattached	End of contract	11 October 2023	
14	FW	(New Zealand) Milly Clegg	(United States) Racing Louisville	Undisclosed	23 January 2024	

=== Contract extensions ===
No.	Position	Player	Duration	Date	Ref.
32	Bethany Gordon	Midfielder	1 year	4 April 2023	
6	Amy Chessari	Midfielder	2 years	18 May 2023	
23	Ella Abdul Massih	Defender	1 year	22 May 2023	
10	Melissa Caceres	Midfielder	1 year	23 May 2023	
3	Gemma Ferris	Defender	1 year	5 July 2023	
20	Sham Khamis	Goalkeeper	1 year	12 October 2023	

== Pre-season and friendlies ==
23 September 2023	Western Sydney Wanderers (Australia)	0–0 (5–6 p)	(Australia) Canberra United	Forbes, Australia
		Report		Stadium: Botanical Gardens Sporting Grounds

== Competitions ==
=== Overall record ===
Competition	First match	Last match	Starting round	Final position	Record							
Competition	First match	Last match	Starting round	Final position	Pld	W	D	L	GF	GA	GD	Win %
A-League Women	14 October 2023	30 March 2024	Matchday 1	7th	22	10	3	9	30	30	+0	45.45
Total					22	10	3	9	30	30	+0	45.45

Last updated: 30 March 2024
Source: Soccerway

=== A-League Women ===
==== League table ====
Pos	Team	Pld	W	D	L	GF	GA	GD	Pts	Qualification
5	Central Coast Mariners	22	10	5	7	31	24	+7	35	Qualification to Finals series
6	Newcastle Jets	22	10	3	9	43	36	+7	33	Qualification to Finals series
7	Western Sydney Wanderers	22	10	3	9	30	30	0	33	
8	Wellington Phoenix (Note: Wellington Phoenix cannot qualify for Asian Football Confederation competitions as they are based in New Zealand, which is under the Oceania Football Confederation.)	22	9	1	12	36	33	+3	28	
9	Brisbane Roar	22	7	5	10	28	35	−7	26	

Source: A-Leagues
Rules for classification: 1) points; 2) wins; 3) goal difference; 4) goals scored; 5) head-to-head results; 6) Fair Play points; 7) away head-to-head results; 8) home head-to-head results; 9) toss of a coin

==== Results summary ====
Overall								Home						Away					
Pld	W	D	L	GF	GA	GD	Pts	W	D	L	GF	GA	GD	W	D	L	GF	GA	GD
21	9	3	9	29	30	−1	30	6	0	4	16	12	+4	3	3	5	13	18	−5

Source: KEEPUP

==== Results by round ====
Round	1	2	3	4	6	7	8	9	10	11	12	13	14	15	16	17	18	19	5	20	21	22
Ground	A	H	A	A	A	H	A	H	H	A	N	A	H	A	H	A	H	A	H	H	H	A
Result	L	L	D	L	W	W	D	L	W	W	W	W	L	L	W	L	L	D	W	W	W	L
Position	11	12	12	12	10	9	9	10	8	6	4	4	6	6	4	8	8	8	6	6	5	7
Points	0	0	1	1	4	7	8	8	11	14	17	20	20	20	23	23	23	24	27	30	33	33

Source: KEEPUP
A = Away; H = Home; N = Neutral; W = Win; D = Draw; L = Loss

==== Matches ====
Win Draw Loss

14 October 2023 1	Sydney FC	2–0	Western Sydney Wanderers	Sydney
19:45 AEDT	Fenton 11'; Worts 36'	Report		Stadium: Allianz Stadium; Attendance: 11,471; Referee: Casey Reibelt

22 October 2023 2	Western Sydney Wanderers	0–3	Wellington Phoenix	Sydney
17:45 AEDT		Report	Speckmaier 68'; Fraser 83'; Elliott 87'	Stadium: CommBank Stadium; Attendance: 2,461; Referee: Isabella Libri

4 November 2023 3	Newcastle Jets	1–1	Western Sydney Wanderers	Newcastle
17:45 AEDT	Davis 90+2'	Report	Bruce 79'	Stadium: McDonald Jones Stadium; Attendance: 2,422; Referee: Caitlin Williams

12 November 2023 4	Melbourne City	4–3	Western Sydney Wanderers	Melbourne
17:45 AEDT	Pollicina 26' (pen.); McNamara 32', 58', 64'	Report	Harding 43', 74'; Bruce 69'	Stadium: AAMI Park; Attendance: 2,010; Referee: Isabella Libri

25 November 2023 6	Western United	0–2	Western Sydney Wanderers	Melbourne
16:00 AEDT		Report	Harding 82'; Rue 90+3'	Stadium: City Vista Recreation Reserve; Attendance: 925; Referee: Azusa Sugino

8 December 2023 7	Western Sydney Wanderers	3–0	Central Coast Mariners	Sydney
19:00 AEDT	Harding 45+2', 69'; King 54' (o.g.)	Report		Stadium: Wanderers Football Park; Attendance: 968; Referee: Casey Reibelt

17 December 2023 8	Brisbane Roar	1–1	Western Sydney Wanderers	Brisbane
17:00 AEST	Corbin 26'	Report	Harding 50'	Stadium: Perry Park; Attendance: 1,575; Referee: Kate Jacewicz

23 December 2023 9	Western Sydney Wanderers	0–1	Adelaide United	Sydney
18:00 AEDT		Report	Holmes 2'	Stadium: Wanderers Football Park; Attendance: 548; Referee: Bec Mackie

30 December 2023 10	Western Sydney Wanderers	2–0	Melbourne Victory	Sydney
18:00 AEDT	Harrison 38'; Apostolakis 51'	Report		Stadium: Wanderers Football Park; Attendance: 696; Referee: Isabella Libri

7 January 2024 11	Perth Glory	0–2	Western Sydney Wanderers	Perth
19:00 AWST		Report	Harding 24', 72'	Stadium: Macedonia Park; Attendance: 1,469; Referee: Isabella Mossin

14 January 2024 12	Western Sydney Wanderers	1–0	Melbourne City	Sydney
17:00 AEDT	Caspers 67'	Report		Stadium: CommBank Stadium; Attendance: 1,515; Referee: Isabella Blaess

21 January 2024 13	Central Coast Mariners	1–2	Western Sydney Wanderers	Gosford
18:00 AEDT	Gomez 48'	Report	Caspers 43'; Wardlow 54' (o.g.)	Stadium: Industree Group Stadium; Attendance: 2,733; Referee: Rebecca Durcau

27 January 2024 14	Western Sydney Wanderers	1–3	Brisbane Roar	Sydney
17:00 AEDT	Caspers 39'	Report	Stephenson 11'; Yallop 48'; Corbin 52'	Stadium: Marconi Stadium; Attendance: 852; Referee: Caitlin Williams

3 February 2024 15	Adelaide United	2–1	Western Sydney Wanderers	Adelaide
16:30 ACDT	Blake 71'; Panagaris 85'	Report	Harrison 44' (pen.)	Stadium: Coopers Stadium; Attendance: 3,844; Referee: Casey Reibelt

9 February 2024 16	Western Sydney Wanderers	2–1	Newcastle Jets	Bathurst
19:00 AEDT	Harding 43'; Bruce 79'	Report	Copus-Brown 14'	Stadium: Carrington Park; Attendance: 3,873; Referee: Isabella Mossin

16 February 2024 17	Melbourne Victory	4–0	Western Sydney Wanderers	Melbourne
19:00 AEDT	Weinert 20', 63'; Gielnik 60', 71'	Report		Stadium: The Home of the Matildas; Attendance: 818; Referee: Molly Godsell

2 March 2024 18	Western Sydney Wanderers	0–2	Sydney FC	Sydney
17:00 AEDT		Report	Hawkesby 67' (pen.); Tallon-Henniker 90+3'	Stadium: CommBank Stadium; Attendance: 9,577; Referee: Casey Reibelt

9 March 2024 19	Canberra United	1–1	Western Sydney Wanderers	Canberra
16:00 AEDT	Flannery 57'	Report	Morris 90+7'	Stadium: McKellar Park; Attendance: 1,584; Referee: Bec Mackie

13 March 2024 5	Western Sydney Wanderers	4–1	Canberra United	Sydney
19:00 AEDT	Caspers 4', 46'; Buchanan 14'; McComasky 46'	Report	Heyman 1'	Stadium: Wanderers Football Park; Attendance: 376; Referee: Kelly Jones
Note: Match originally scheduled for 18 November but postponed to 13 March due to venue unavailability at the time.

16 March 2024 20	Western Sydney Wanderers	1–0	Perth Glory	Sydney
16:00 AEDT	Harding 53'	Report		Stadium: Wanderers Football Park; Attendance: 427; Referee: Isabella Mossin

23 March 2024 21	Western Sydney Wanderers	3–1	Western United	Sydney
18:00 AEDT	Buchanan 39'; Harding 61', 82'	Report	Keane 17'	Stadium: Wanderers Football Park; Attendance: 824; Referee: Casey Reibelt

30 March 2024 22	Wellington Phoenix	2–0	Western Sydney Wanderers	Porirua
14:00 NZDT	Main 18', 55'	Report		Stadium: Jerry Collins Stadium; Attendance: 1,280; Referee: Caitlin Williams

== Statistics ==
=== Appearances and goals ===
Includes all competitions. Players with no appearances not included in the list.

As of 30 March 2024

No.	Pos.	Nat.	Name	A-League Women		Total	
No.	Pos.	Nat.	Name	Apps	Goals	Apps	Goals
1	GK	(United States)	Kaylie Collins	11	0	11	0
2	DF	(United States)	Vicky Bruce	22	3	22	3
3	DF	(Australia)	Gemma Ferris	3+10	0	13	0
4	DF	(Australia)	Madison McComasky	20	1	20	1
5	DF	(Australia)	Lauren Keir	2+4	0	6	0
6	MF	(Australia)	Amy Chessari	10+4	0	14	0
7	MF	(Australia)	Amy Harrison	21+1	2	22	2
8	MF	(Australia)	Olivia Price	18+1	0	19	0
9	FW	(Australia)	Sophie Harding	20+1	12	21	12
10	MF	(Australia)	Melissa Caceres	3+12	0	15	0
11	DF	(Australia)	Danika Matos	22	0	22	0
14	DF	(Australia)	Ella Buchanan	5+2	2	7	2
15	FW	(Australia)	Cushla Rue	19+2	2	21	2
17	MF	(Australia)	India Breier	1+5	0	6	0
18	FW	(United States)	Maliah Morris	11+8	1	19	1
19	MF	(Australia)	Talia Younis	5+10	0	15	0
20	GK	(Australia)	Sham Khamis	11	0	11	0
21	MF	(Australia)	Alexia Apostolakis	16+1	1	17	1
22	MF	(Australia)	Ischia Brooking	0+4	0	4	0
23	MF	(Australia)	Ella Abdul-Massih	0+11	0	11	0
25	MF	(Australia)	Holly Caspers	14+4	5	18	5
32	MF	(Australia)	Bethany Gordon	7	0	7	0
Player(s) transferred out but featured this season
14	FW	(New Zealand)	Milly Clegg	1+0	0	1	0

=== Disciplinary record ===
Includes all competitions. The list is sorted by squad number when total cards are equal. Players with no cards not included in the list.

As of 30 March 2024

Rank	No.	Pos.	Nat.	Name	A-League Women			Total		
Rank	No.	Pos.	Nat.	Name	Yellow card	(yellow card) (yellow-red card)	Red card	Yellow card	(yellow card) (yellow-red card)	Red card
1	2	DF	(United States)	Vicky Bruce	2	0	1	2	0	1
2	7	MF	(Australia)	Amy Harrison	4	0	0	4	0	0
3	9	FW	(Australia)	Sophie Harding	3	0	0	3	0	0
5	4	DF	(Australia)	Madison McComasky	2	0	0	2	0	0
5	25	MF	(Australia)	Holly Caspers	2	0	0	2	0	0
7	8	MF	(Australia)	Olivia Price	1	0	0	1	0	0
7	10	MF	(Australia)	Melissa Caceres	1	0	0	1	0	0
7	15	FW	(Australia)	Cushla Rue	1	0	0	1	0	0
7	23	MF	(Australia)	Ella Abdul-Massih	1	0	0	1	0	0
Total					17	0	1	17	0	1

=== Clean sheets ===
Includes all competitions. The list is sorted by squad number when total clean sheets are equal. Numbers in parentheses represent games where both goalkeepers participated and both kept a clean sheet; the number in parentheses is awarded to the goalkeeper who was substituted, whilst a full clean sheet is awarded to the goalkeeper who was on the field at the start of play. Goalkeepers with no clean sheets not included in the list.

As of 30 March 2024

Rank	No.	Nat.	Goalkeeper	A-League Women	Total
1	1	(United States)	Kaylie Collins	3	3
1	20	(Australia)	Sham Khamis	3	3
Total				6	6

== See also ==
- 2023–24 Western Sydney Wanderers FC season
