= Carlyn Baldwin =

American soccer player

Personal information
- Full name: Carlyn Elizabeth Baldwin
- Date of birth: March 17, 1996 (age 30)
- Place of birth: Reston, Virginia, USA
- Height: 1.60 m (5 ft 3 in)
- Position: Midfielder

College career
Years	Team	Apps	(Gls)
2014–2016	Tennessee Volunteers	56	(6)

Senior career*
Years	Team	Apps	(Gls)
2016	BSC YB Frauen	1	(0)
2017–2021	Sporting CP	49	(7)
2021–2022	Torreense	14	(2)
2022	Benfica	1	(0)
2022–2023	Damaiense	18	(1)
2023–2024	Braga	2	(2)
2024–2025	Torreense	9	(0)
2025	Fort Lauderdale United	3	(0)
Total		97	(12)

International career^{‡}
2014	United States U20		
2018–2019	United States U23	1	(0)
- * Club domestic league appearances and goals as of 17:36, December 21, 2025 (UTC) ‡ National team caps and goals as of 8 May 2020

Carlyn Elizabeth Baldwin (born March 17, 1996) is an American former professional soccer player who played as a midfielder. She played college soccer for the Tennessee Volunteers before starting her professional career in Switzerland with BSC YB Frauen. She then spent eight years in Portugal with Campeonato Nacional Feminino clubs Sporting CP, Torreense, Benfica, Damaiense, and Braga before ending her career back in the United States with USL Super League club Fort Lauderdale United FC.

== Early life ==
Baldwin attended National Cathedral School, where she played varsity soccer for head coach Richie Burke. She also played youth soccer for Braddock Road YC in Virginia. She was reportedly recruited in 2014 by Olympique Lyon to turn professional out of high school and participated in training camp with the club, but committed to the University of Tennessee to play collegiate soccer. She had also been invited to train with National Women's Soccer League team Washington Spirit.

== Club career ==
Baldwin played half of a season for BSC YB Frauen in 2016.

On July 11, 2017, Baldwin became the first foreign signing for Sporting CP. She played for Sporting CP until 2021, appearing for them in the 2017–18 and 2018–19 UEFA Women's Champions Leagues. She was one of nine players released by the club on June 2, 2021, including the club's captain Nevena Damjanović.

Baldwin played for Torreense from 2021 to 2022.

On July 4, 2022, Baldwin signed a contract with Benfica to 2024. She debuted for Benfica in the Lagoa Summer Cup on August 7, 2022, which Benfica won. Baldwin and Benfica mutually terminated the contract on August 28, 2022.

Baldwin played for Damaiense in 2022 and 2023. She then joined Braga before spending the 2024–25 season back with Torreense.

On August 8, 2025, Baldwin signed with Fort Lauderdale United FC ahead of its second campaign in the USL Super League. She debuted for the club on August 23, coming on as a second-half substitute for Taylor Smith in Fort Lauderdale's season-opening draw with Lexington SC.

In October 2025, Baldwin announced her retirement from professional soccer.

== International career ==
Baldwin played for the United States women's national under-20 soccer team in the 2014 FIFA U-20 Women's World Cup.

== Personal life ==
Her father, Steve Baldwin, was the primary owner of the National Women's Soccer League team Washington Spirit from 2018 to 2022.

== Honors ==
- Campeonato Nacional Feminino: 2017–18
- Taça de Portugal Feminina: 2017–18
- Supertaça de Portugal Feminina: 2017
