= Maggie Mace =

American soccer player (born 2004)

Personal information
- Full name: Margot Elizabeth Mace
- Date of birth: January 7, 2004 (age 22)
- Height: 5 ft 7 in (1.70 m)
- Position: Defender

Team information
- Current team: Fort Lauderdale United
- Number: 5

Youth career
- North Florida Soccer Academy
- Jacksonville FC

College career
| Years | Team | Apps | (Gls) |
| 2022–2023 | Coastal Carolina Chanticleers | 34 | (1) |
| 2024–2025 | Washington State Cougars | 38 | (2) |

Senior career*
| Years | Team | Apps | (Gls) |
| 2026– | Fort Lauderdale United | 10 | (0) |
- * Club domestic league appearances and goals as of 01:43, June 10, 2026 (UTC)

Margot Elizabeth Mace (born January 7, 2004) is an American professional soccer player who plays as a defender for USL Super League club Fort Lauderdale United FC. She played college soccer for the Coastal Carolina Chanticleers and the Washington State Cougars.

== Early life ==
Mace grew up in Ponte Vedra Beach, Florida, alongside two siblings. She attended Ponte Vedra High School, where she followed in the footsteps of her older sister, Lillian, by joining the school's soccer team. She went on to earn two midfielder of the year awards and one team MVP award with Ponte Vedra; she also contributed to three district championships and a state title in her junior year. Mace played soccer outside of school for North Florida Soccer Academy and Jacksonville FC.

== College career ==
=== Coastal Carolina Chanticleers ===
In her two seasons with the Coastal Carolina Chanticleers, Mace played in all 34 of her team's matches, starting in all but one. As a freshman, she operated as a midfielder and ranked third in shot attempts across the Chanticleers' squad. On October 6, 2022, she recorded her first career goal contribution, an assist against Southern Miss. As a sophomore in 2023, Mace led Coastal Carolina with 1,492 minutes played, participating in the entirety of all matches except for one. She scored her first collegiate goal on October 14, 2023, the tying goal in a 2–2 draw with Troy.

=== Washington State Cougars ===
Mace transferred to Washington State University ahead of the 2024 soccer season. In her first year with the Cougars, she played in all 19 of Washington State's matches as a defensive midfielder. She had the highest amount of minutes played out of all of the Cougars' incoming transfers that year. In the lead-up to her senior year, Mace was selected as one of the team's co-captains. Despite being the only returning WSU midfielder with starting experience, she spent much of 2025 filling in as a defender after injuries plagued Washington State's backline. She went on to receive an All-West Coast Conference Honorable Mention award after leading her team in minutes for the second time in her collegiate career. She also netted a career-high two goals, both of which were penalty kicks.

== Club career ==
On 13 March 2026, USL Super League club Fort Lauderdale United FC announced that they had signed Mace to her first professional contract in preparation for the final ten matches of the team's season. Mace made her pro debut the following day, starting and playing 74 minutes in a 1–0 loss to fellow Floridian side Sporting JAX. She ended up appearing in all of Fort Lauderdale's remaining matches in the final stretch of the season as the team finished in last place of the Super League standings.

== Career statistics ==
=== Club ===
As of July 17, 2026

Appearances and goals by club, season and competition
| Club | Season | League | | | Cup | | Playoffs | | Total | |
| Club | Season | Division | Apps | Goals | Apps | Goals | Apps | Goals | Apps | Goals |
|---|---|---|---|---|---|---|---|---|---|---|
| Fort Lauderdale United FC | 2025–26 | USL Super League | 10 | 0 | — | | — | | 10 | 0 |
| Career total | | | 10 | 0 | 0 | 0 | 0 | 0 | 10 | 0 |
