= Wellness in school =

Wellness in School is offered as a unit in some K-8 elementary schools in the United States. It is defined as the quality or state of being in good health, especially as an actively sought goal. Wellness is taught in 6 or 7 dimensions: physical, social, intellectual, emotional, occupational, spiritual and environmental. Inclusion of the latter two is controversial. While the teaching of "The Whole Child" seems to be an antiquated philosophy with public schools trending towards high-stakes testing, there are many schools such as Montessori and other philosophies/pedagogies that value this curriculum. The following isn't an expanded definition of each, but simply what the goals and objectives are for each dimension.

== Physical ==
The physical dimension focuses on three sub-categories: healthy eating, exercise, and the human body (digestive system, skeletal system and circulatory systems).

== Intellectual ==
For K-5 the focus can be on the brain controlling the body, all the way up to studying the parts of the brain. Students are expected to understand that different parts control different body functions.

== Spiritual ==
Students learn techniques to harmonize their actions with the world around them.

== Emotional ==
Students learn to identify negative and positive emotions and coping strategies.

== Occupational ==
Students learn to connect the job they want with the necessary preparation.

== Social ==
Students learn the importance and skills of communication.

== Environmental ==
Students learn to connect their own and their family's actions to the health of the environment around them.
