= Lilly McCarthy =

American soccer player (born 2002)

Personal information
- Full name: Lillian Margaret McCarthy
- Date of birth: March 25, 2002 (age 24)
- Height: 5 ft 10 in (1.78 m)
- Position: Midfielder

Youth career
- Maryland United

College career
Years	Team	Apps	(Gls)
2020–2024	West Virginia Mountaineers	91	(8)

Senior career*
Years	Team	Apps	(Gls)
2025–2026	Fort Lauderdale United	9	(1)
- * Club domestic league appearances and goals as of 03:36, May 18, 2026 (UTC)

Lillian Margaret McCarthy (born March 25, 2002) is an American professional soccer player who plays as a midfielder. She played college soccer for the West Virginia Mountaineers before starting her professional career with USL Super League club Fort Lauderdale United FC.

== Early life ==
McCarthy grew up in Baltimore, Maryland, as one of four children born to Mark and Erin McCarthy. She started playing soccer before kindergarten after her father introduced her to the sport by taking her to a Johns Hopkins women's soccer game. McCarthy attended the McDonogh School in Owings Mills, where she played four years on the varsity soccer team. She went on to lead McDonogh to three straight conference championships and recognition as the third-best school in the nation two years in a row. She was a three-time all-state and two-time all-east region honoree. In her later years at McDonogh, she was a team captain and received a spot on the 2019 high school All-American teams of five different outlets, including of the United Soccer Coaches and TopDrawerSoccer. She also played youth club soccer for Maryland United FC.

== College career ==
In her first season with the West Virginia Mountaineers, McCarthy was named to the All-Big 12 freshman team after recording 2 assists across 12 appearances. One of her assists came on April 3, 2021, after she set up the lone goal in a 1–0 victory over Virginia; her strong performance in the game earned her the honor of Big 12 Freshman of the Week. As a sophomore, she started in all 19 of her appearances and co-led West Virginia with 3 assists. She scored her first collegiate goal on September 16, 2021, the game-winner against James Madison less than two minutes after halftime. In 2022, she played a career-high 1,325 minutes en route to a Big 12 conference title.

McCarthy lost her starting spot in her senior year, coming on as a substitute in all but one of her 17 appearances as she logged 400 minutes across 2023. In August 2023, she assisted Maddie Moreau in a record-breaking 9–0 win over Saint Francis. McCarthy returned for a fifth year, in which she was named first-team All-Big 12 and second-team All-Midwest. She also shined academically, becoming the Mountaineers' first All-American scholar since Jordan Brewster two years prior.

== Club career ==
On August 4, 2025, USL Super League club Fort Lauderdale United FC announced that they had signed McCarthy to her first professional contract ahead of the Super League's second season of play. McCarthy made her pro debut on September 6, 2025, coming on as a stoppage-time substitute for Jasmine Hamid in Fort Lauderdale's first win of the season, a victory over Spokane Zephyr FC. On October 16, she scored her first professional goal, striking from outside the box in a 5–1 loss to Lexington SC. She totaled 9 appearances with Fort Lauderdale before departing from the club after one season.

== Honors and awards ==
West Virginia Mountaineers

- Big 12 Conference women's soccer tournament: 2022

Individual

- First-team All-Big 12: 2024
- All-Big 12 freshman team: 2020
