= Kat González =

American soccer player (born 2000)

Personal information
- Full name: Kathrynn M. González Sosa
- Birth name: Kathrynn M. González
- Date of birth: 12 July 2000 (age 26)
- Place of birth: Blakeslee, Pennsylvania
- Height: 1.65 m (5 ft 5 in)
- Position: Midfielder

Youth career
- 2014–2017: Pocono Mountain West Panthers

College career
Years	Team	Apps	(Gls)
2018–2019	East Carolina Pirates	25	(1)
2020–2022	Marshall Thundering Herd	43	(12)

Senior career*
Years	Team	Apps	(Gls)
2023–2024	Thy-Thisted	5	(0)
2024	Carolina Ascent (USLW)	9	(8)
2024–2025	Carolina Ascent	22	(0)
2025–2026	Fort Lauderdale United	25	(1)

International career^{‡}
2021–	Dominican Republic	11	(5)
- * Club domestic league appearances and goals as of 17 May 2026 ‡ National team caps and goals as of 14 April 2026

Kathrynn M. González Sosa (born 12 July 2000) is a professional footballer who most plays as a midfielder. Born in the United States, she plays for the Dominican Republic national team. She played college soccer for the East Carolina Pirates and the Marshall Thundering Herd.

== Early life ==
González was raised in Blakeslee, Pennsylvania. Her father is Puerto Rican and her mother is Dominican. She attended Pocono Mountain West High School in Pocono Summit, Pennsylvania; East Carolina University in Greenville, North Carolina; and Marshall University in Huntington, West Virginia.

== International career ==
González made her senior debut for the Dominican Republic on 7 July 2021 as a 65th-minute substition in a 0–1 friendly loss to Nicaragua.

== Honors ==
Carolina Ascent

- USL Super League Players' Shield: 2024–25
