= Ella Simpson =

American soccer player (born 2002)

Personal information
- Full name: Ella Grace Simpson
- Date of birth: July 21, 2002 (age 24)
- Height: 5 ft 10 in (1.78 m)
- Position: Defender

Team information
- Current team: Fort Lauderdale United
- Number: 18

Youth career
- The First Academy
- Orlando City Youth Soccer

College career
Years	Team	Apps	(Gls)
2020–2024	Samford Bulldogs	97	(21)

Senior career*
Years	Team	Apps	(Gls)
2025–	Fort Lauderdale United	23	(4)
- * Club domestic league appearances and goals as of 03:36, May 18, 2026 (UTC)

Ella Grace Simpson (born July 21, 2002) is an American soccer player who plays as a defender for Fort Lauderdale United FC of the USL Super League. She played college soccer for the Samford Bulldogs.

== Early life ==
Simpson grew up in Orlando, Florida, and began playing competitive soccer at age 10. She participated in multiple sports before choosing to focus primarily on soccer during high school. Simpson attended The First Academy, where she earned All-State and All-District honors and was named her team's Most Valuable Player. As a junior, she recorded 58 goals and 27 assists for the Royals. As a senior, she recorded 29 goals and 16 assists.

While in high school, Simpson also played for Orlando City Youth Soccer of the ECNL, appearing in seven matches over just more than a week while managing overlapping club and high school schedules. This led to her being featured in an Orlando Sentinel article about the overlap of high school and club teams. She credited ice baths, stretching, proper nutrition, and sleep for managing the workload, along with keeping up with schoolwork.

She played as an outside defender for her club team and as an offensive playmaker for her high school. She has said that club soccer provided high-level training to develop her skills, while high school soccer taught leadership and team-building.

== College career ==
Simpson signed with Samford University in Alabama, to continue her soccer career at the collegiate level. This decision made her the first member of her family not to attend Florida State University. She enrolled at Samford in 2020 during the COVID-19 pandemic, which resulted in the cancellation of the fall soccer season. The disruption granted her an additional year of eligibility, allowing her to compete across five seasons with the Bulldogs. Simpson started all 97 matches she played, recording 21 goals and 4 assists. She helped the Bulldogs win Southern Conference (SoCon) championships in 2021, 2022, and 2024, earning All‑Tournament Team honors each year.

During her sophomore season, Simpson helped Samford defeat Auburn in the first round of the 2021 NCAA tournament. The victory marked only the second time in program history that the Bulldogs advanced to the tournament's second round, the first occurring in 2005. As a senior in 2024, she was named First Team All‑SoCon after scoring five goals, including the game-winner in the conference title match against Western Carolina. Following the championship, Simpson said of the team’s upcoming NCAA tournament matchup against top-ranked Florida State, "Even as a defender, it’s going to be so exciting to get the opportunity to go against some of the best forwards in the nation. It’s just a great way to put Samford on the map."

== Club career ==
In August 2025, Simpson joined Fort Lauderdale United FC of the USL Super League ahead of the 2025–26 season. Simpson made an immediate impact at Fort Lauderdale United. In September 2025, she led all defenders in the league with two goals and was tied for third in clearances. For her contributions, she was named to the USL Super League Team of the Month alongside teammates Kiara Locklear and Kelli Van Treeck. She scored a header in the 62nd minute to give Fort Lauderdale a 1–0 road victory over Spokane Zephyr FC — the club's first win of the 2025–26 season. The club cited her as one of three rookies powering the strong start to the season, noting her as a “well-rounded and dynamic defender” who started every match and played every minute in the early campaign.

== Style of play ==
Simpson is noted for her versatility in defense—capable of playing centre-back or outside-back. Her aerial presence is marked due to her 5 ft 10 in (1.79 m) height, and she brings a scoring threat from set pieces. Additionally, she prides herself on being composed on the ball and contributing offensively when possible.

== Personal life ==
While attending Samford, Simpson was a member of Zeta Tau Alpha and attended Auburn Community Church. During her final year of eligibility, she pursued a master's degree in sports marketing while continuing to play.

== Honors and awards ==
USL Super League

- Team of the Month: September 2025

Southern Conference

- First Team All-Conference: 2024
- All-Tournament Team: 2021, 2022
- All-Freshman Team: 2020–21
