= Sophie Harding =

Australian soccer player

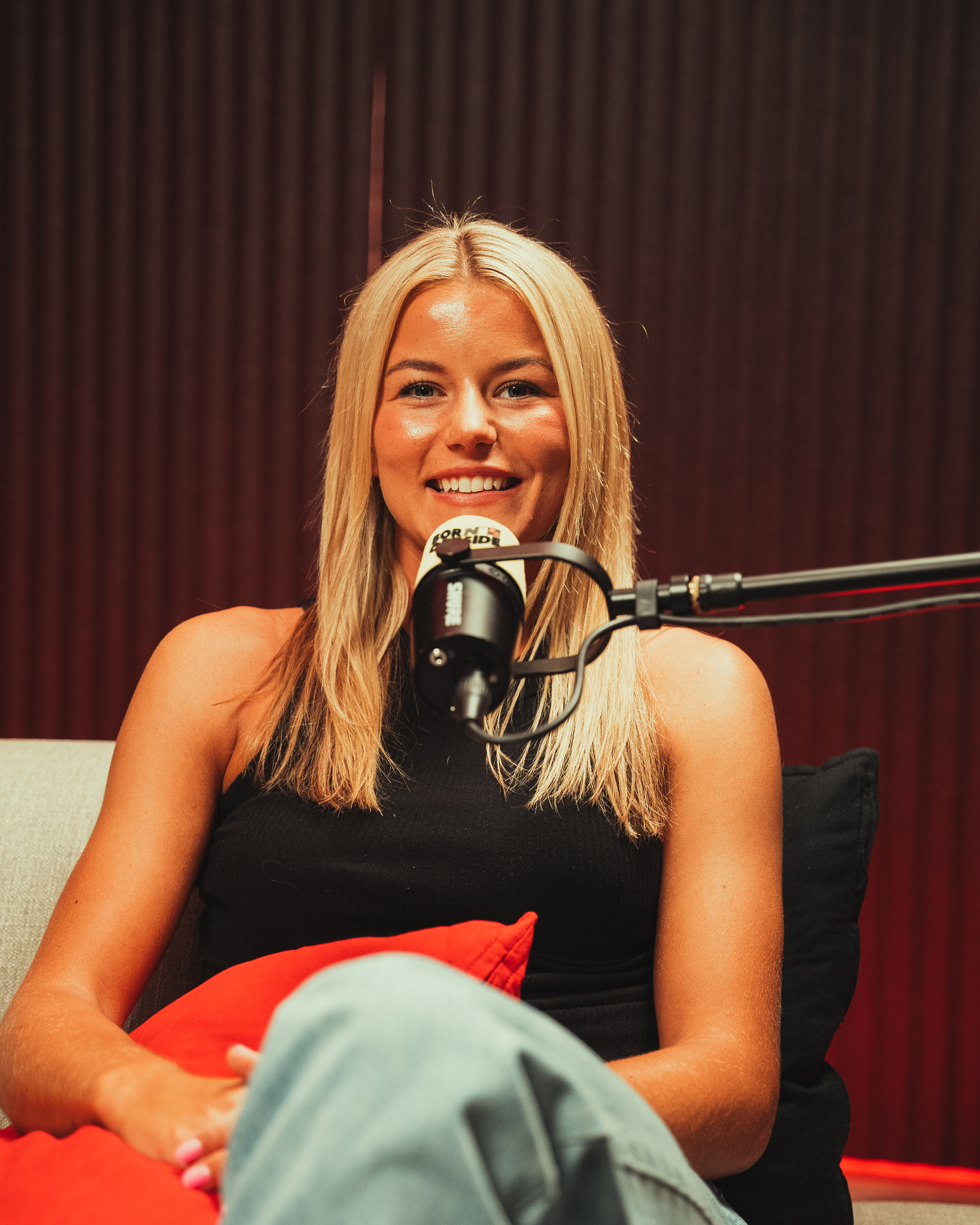
- Harding in 2023

Personal information
- Full name: Sophie Harding
- Date of birth: 10 June 1999 (age 27)
- Place of birth: England
- Position: Forward

Team information
- Current team: Melbourne Victory
- Number: 8

Youth career
- Harbord Seasiders United
- Brookvale
- Manly United

Senior career*
Years	Team	Apps	(Gls)
2015–2017	Manly United	42	(8)
2018–2021	North West Sydney Koalas	44	(19)
2020–2022	Newcastle Jets	25	(2)
2022–2025	Western Sydney Wanderers	58	(18)
2025–2026	Fort Lauderdale United	14	(0)
2026–	Melbourne Victory	0	(0)

International career
2024–	Australia	0	(0)
- * Club domestic league appearances and goals as of 03:34, 18 May 2026 (UTC)

Sophie Harding (born 6 June 1999) is an Australian professional soccer player who plays as a forward for A-League Women club Melbourne Victory. She has previously played for A-League Women clubs Newcastle Jets and Western Sydney Wanderers, in addition to USL Super League club Fort Lauderdale United.

== Early life ==
Harding was born in England before immigrating to Sydney, Australia at the age of six. She played youth football for Harbord Seasiders United, Brookvale, and Manly United. Harding began playing for Manly's U'13 team and progressed to the first team who she represented for three years.

In addition to her career as a footballer, Harding is a disability support worker, with Harding receiving the news of her first national team callup while she was in the middle of a shift.

== Club career ==
Harding made her National Premier Leagues NSW Women's debut for Manly United in 2015. After breaking through with Manly she joined fellow NSW NPLW side North West Sydney Koalas in 2019, Harding has scored 19 goals in 44 appearances across three seasons with NWS Koalas.

Harding was signed by A-League Women club Newcastle Jets ahead of the 2020–21 season. She played 11 of the Jets 12 matches and was noted for her pace. The young forward scored her first goal for Newcastle in a 5–1 win over Wellington Phoenix on Matchday 2 of the 2021–22 season, after re-signing for the season. In September 2022, the club announced she had departed, and two months later she signed a two-year contract with Western Sydney Wanderers.

In July 2025, Harding moved to American USL Super League club Fort Lauderdale United. She made 14 matches (2 starts) for the Floridian club before departing after one season.

In September 2026, Harding returned to Australia, joining Melbourne Victory.

== International career ==
As an Australian citizen born in England with Irish grandparents, Harding is eligible to represent Australia, England and the Republic of Ireland.

In February 2024, Harding received her first international call up to the Australian national team for the 2024 AFC Women's Olympic Qualifying Tournament third round against Uzbekistan.

== Career statistics ==
As of match played 21 March 2026

Appearances and goals by club, season and competition
Club	Season	League			Cup		Continental		Other		Total	
Club	Season	Division	Apps	Goals	Apps	Goals	Apps	Goals	Apps	Goals	Apps	Goals
Newcastle Jets	2020–21	A-League Women	11	0	-	-	-	-	-	-	11	0
Newcastle Jets	2021–22	A-League Women	14	2	-	-	-	-	-	-	14	2
North West Sydney Spirit FC	2022	NSW	22	6	-	-	-	-	-	-	22	6
North West Sydney Spirit FC (loan)	2023	NSW	4	0	-	-	-	-	-	-	4	0
Western Sydney Wanderers	2022–23	A-League Women	18	2	-	-	-	-	-	-	18	2
Western Sydney Wanderers	2023–24	A-League Women	21	12	-	-	-	-	-	-	21	12
Western Sydney Wanderers	2024–25	A-League Women	19	4	-	-	-	-	-	-	19	4
Fort Lauderdale United FC	2025–26	USL Super League	8	0	-	-	-	-	-	-	8	0
Career total			117	26	0	0	0	0	0	0	117	26
