= Ali Rogers (soccer) =

American soccer coach (born 1994)

Personal information
- Full name: Alissa Rogers
- Date of birth: May 25, 1994 (age 32)
- Height: 5 ft 8 in (1.73 m)
- Position: Midfielder

Youth career
- Chicago Fire
- Island Coast Soccer Alliance
- Cagliari Strike Force

College career
| Years | Team | Apps | (Gls) |
| 2012–2016 | Florida Gulf Coast Eagles | 73 | (11) |

Senior career*
| Years | Team | Apps | (Gls) |
| 2018 | Medyk Konin | – | (–) |

Managerial career
- 2019–2022: Florida Gulf Coast Eagles (assistant coach)
- 2023: Florida Gulf Coast Eagles (associate head coach)
- 2023–2024: Dartmouth Big Green (associate head coach)
- 2024–2025: Fort Lauderdale United (associate head coach)
- 2025: Fort Lauderdale United (interim head coach)
- 2025–2026: Fort Lauderdale United
- * Club domestic league appearances and goals

Alissa Rogers (born May 25, 1994) is an American soccer coach and former player. Rogers played college soccer for the Florida Gulf Coast Eagles before spending a short professional stint with Polish club KKPK Medyk Konin. She has previously served as the head coach of USL Super League club Fort Lauderdale United FC, as well as an associate head coach for the Florida Gulf Coast Eagles and the Dartmouth Big Green.

== Early life ==
Rogers grew up in Naples, Florida, as the only girl out of four children born to Ed and Marianne Rogers. She attended Gulf Coast High School, where she recorded over 80 career goals and just shy of 50 career assists. She was her team's assist leader in all four years and top goalscorer in three.

A multi-sport athlete, Rogers also lettered in football, track, and tennis. Her kicking power caught the eye of football scouts, who invited Rogers to train alongside NFL coaches and scouts at the Football University Camp in 2011. Outside of school, she played youth soccer for multiple clubs, including the Chicago Fire, Island Coast Soccer Alliance, and Cagliari Strike Force.

== College career ==
Rogers chose to attend Florida Gulf Coast University ahead of eleven other schools. After scoring two goals in her first two games with the Eagles, she suffered a season-ending ACL injury and redshirted her freshman year. She returned to the field in 2013 and managed to tally 17 appearances despite still dealing with injury problems. In her third year at FGCU, Rogers started all 21 games and contributed to an Atlantic Sun Conference title after recording an assist in the Eagles' semifinal win over Northern Kentucky. She went on to help her team win the ASUN championship twice more over the next two years. On November 14, 2015, she contributed to FGCU's first-ever NCAA tournament victory, which came against USF.

As a fifth-year player in a team composed largely of freshman, Rogers adopted a more senior role in 2016. She shined, receiving first-team all-region, third-team all-region, and ASUN Tournament MVP honors. She played a key role in the FGCU's conference tournament title, contributing an assist in the Eagles' semifinal win over Kennesaw State and scoring both of the team's goals in the championship match against Lipscomb. Rogers, a two-year captain for FGCU, departed from the program eighth in program history in goals scored. She had contributed to five ASUN regular season championships, four ASUN tournament titles, and four appearances in the NCAA tournament.

== Club career ==
In February 2018, Rogers signed her first professional contract with Polish side KKPK Medyk Konin. She spent half of a season with the club before transitioning to coaching later in 2018. As of 2022, she is one of only seven FGCU players to have played soccer professionally.

== Coaching career ==
=== Florida Gulf Coast Eagles ===
Rogers returned to the Florida Gulf Coast Eagles soccer team in 2018 as Director of Operations. In June 2019, she was promoted to the role of assistant coach. Rogers continued to collect responsibilities over the coming years, adding the role of recruiting coordinator in 2021. That season, she helped coach FGCU's conference to 7 shutouts and the fewest number of goals allowed in the conference. In 2023, she was promoted to associate head coach. In her five years as a coach for the Eagles, Rogers helped the team win two ASUN regular season championships and one tournament title.

=== Dartmouth Big Green ===
On March 3, 2023, the Dartmouth Big Green announced that they had hired Rogers as associate head coach for the upcoming season. Rogers also served as Dartmouth's recruiting coordinator, as she had done previously at FGCU. In her first season on the Big Green's coaching staff, she helped guide Dartmouth two its second-best season since 2012, including a ten-game win streak to kick off the team's 2023 campaign.

=== Fort Lauderdale United ===
Rogers joined Fort Lauderdale United FC as associate head coach and head of recruitment in June 2024, ahead of the inaugural USL Super League season. She helped Fort Lauderdale United finish reach the USL Super League final in its first season, where the team was ultimately defeated by Tampa Bay Sun FC. After the 2024–25 season concluded, Rogers took on more responsibility, adding the positions of girls academy technical director, college advisor, and liaison to Florida West FC in May 2025. She had previously spent five years in the Florida youth setup as Florida West FC's director of player development and ECNL head coach.

To begin the 2025–26 season, Rogers filled the role of acting head coach. On September 16, 2025, she was officially named as the club's head coach, replacing Tyrone Mears, who became Fort Lauderdale United's president of soccer. Rogers became the first female coach in club history. After piloting Fort Lauderdale to an unbeaten first five games, Rogers received joint recognition with Mears as the September 2025 USL Super League Coaches of the Month. From there, she led Fort Lauderdale through a seven-game winless streak that included five defeats. On February 10, 2026, Fort Lauderdale United announced that they had parted ways with Rogers.

== Coaching statistics ==
Coaching record by team and tenure
| Team | From | To | Record | | | | | | | |
| Team | From | To | G | W | D | L | GF | GA | GD | Win % |
|---|---|---|---|---|---|---|---|---|---|---|
| Fort Lauderdale United FC | September 16, 2025 | February 10, 2026 | 12 | 2 | 4 | 6 | 10 | 24 | −14 | 16.67 |
