= Taylor Smith (soccer, born 2007) =

American soccer player (born 2007)

Personal information
- Full name: Taylor Ava Smith
- Date of birth: October 14, 2007 (age 19)
- Height: 5 ft 7 in (1.70 m)
- Position: Midfielder

Team information
- Current team: Fort Lauderdale United
- Number: 3

Youth career
- 2021–2024: NSU University Sharks

Senior career*
Years	Team	Apps	(Gls)
2024–	Fort Lauderdale United	52	(0)
- * Club domestic league appearances and goals as of 03:36, May 18, 2026 (UTC)

Taylor Ava Smith (born October 14, 2007) is an American professional soccer player who plays as a midfielder for USL Super League club Fort Lauderdale United. The daughter of Fort Lauderdale United founder Tommy Smith, she debuted for the club at age 16 and signed professionally at age 17 in 2025.

== Early life ==
The daughter of Fort Lauderdale United founder and chairman Tommy Smith, Smith grew up in Fort Lauderdale, Florida. She began playing soccer around age six and often played with boys growing up. She joined the varsity team at the NSU University School in Davie, Florida, when she was in eighth grade. In her freshman season, she scored 17 goals and added 24 assists as she captained the team to the state finals in 2023. She posted 24 goals and 33 assists as a sophomore, returning to the state semifinals, and was named the Miami Herald's Broward 4A-2A Girls' Soccer Player of the Year in 2024. She played ECNL club soccer for FC Prime.

== Career ==
At age 16, Smith signed an academy contract (allowing her to retain college eligibility) with Fort Lauderdale United before the USL Super League's inaugural 2024–25 season. She was the youngest player on the team. She made her USL Super League debut as a 50th-minute substitute for Nia Christopher in the club's second game, a 2–1 loss to the Carolina Ascent, on September 6, 2024. Head coach Tyrone Mears handed Smith her first start in a 3–1 loss to Brooklyn FC on October 27. She was subsequently a regular starter in United's midfield and ranked third in minutes played in their inaugural season.

On March 20, 2025, Fort Lauderdale United announced that they had signed Smith to her first professional contract, making her the first USL Super League academy player to go pro and the youngest professional in the league at the time. After placing fourth in the standings, she started both playoff games as United won 2–1 over the top-seeded Carolina Ascent in the semifinals, then lost 1–0 to the Tampa Bay Sun in the final in extra time.

On September 6, 2025, Smith was shown the first red card in club history after earning a second yellow for obstructing the opponent's free kick in stoppage time of United's first win of the 2025–26 season, a 1–0 victory over the Spokane Zephyr. She received her second red card of the season four games later, earning a second yellow for a late challenge on Annie Williams in a 1–1 draw with Brooklyn FC on November 1.

== Honors ==
Fort Lauderdale United

- USL Super League runner-up: 2024–25
