= Nia Christopher =

Bermudian footballer

Personal information
- Full name: Nia Raisa Christopher
- Date of birth: 2 May 2001 (age 25)
- Height: 1.65 m (5 ft 5 in)
- Positions: Forward; midfielder

Team information
- Current team: FH

Youth career
- 201?–2020: The John Carroll Patriots

College career
Years	Team	Apps	(Gls)
2020–2023	Towson Tigers	66	(41)

Senior career*
Years	Team	Apps	(Gls)
2023–2024	Eagle FC	24	(15)
2024–2026	Fort Lauderdale United	15	(0)
2026–	FH	22	(12)

International career
2018	Bermuda U17	3	(0)
2020	Bermuda U20	1	(1)
2018–	Bermuda	13	(8)
- * Club domestic league appearances and goals

Nia Raisa Christopher (born 2 May 2001) is a Bermudian footballer who plays as a forward or midfielder for Besta deild kvenna club FH and the Bermuda national team. She played college soccer for the Towson Tigers before starting her professional career with USL Super League club Fort Lauderdale United FC.

== Early life and education ==
Christopher was raised in the Devonshire Parish and began playing football at age four. Her parents sent her to the United States at age 15, and she initially studied in Georgia for one year. Christopher transferred The John Carroll School in Bel Air, Maryland, where she became a two-time All-Interscholastic Athletic Association of Maryland selection.

== College career ==
Christopher attended Towson University in the United States.

== Club career ==
Christopher signed with Fort Lauderdale United FC in May 2024. Mostly a depth player, she made 15 appearances (1 start) across one and half seasons for Fort Lauderdale before departing from the club on a mutual contract termination in February 2026.

In March 2026, Christopher joined Icelandic side FH ahead of the club's 2026 Besta deild kvenna season.

== International career ==
Christopher represented Bermuda at the 2018 CONCACAF Women's U-17 Championship and the 2020 CONCACAF Women's U-20 Championship. She capped at senior level during two CONCACAF W Championship qualifications (2018 and 2022).

Christopher scored a hat-trick in a 6–0 win against the Cayman Islands on February 22, 2022.

== Personal life ==
Her father, D. Lloyd Christopher, played football at American International College and represented the Bermuda national team before becoming general secretary of the Bermuda Football Association and president of the Bermuda Referees Association.

== Career statistics ==
=== Club ===
Club	Season	Division	League		Cup		Continental		Total	
Club	Season	Division	Apps	Goals	Apps	Goals	Apps	Goals	Apps	Goals
Fort Lauderdale	2024-25	USL Super League	13	0					13	0
Fort Lauderdale	2025-26	USL Super League	2	0					2	0
Fort Lauderdale	Total		15	0					15	0
HI	2026	Besta delid kvenna	22	12	3	4	4	1	29	17
Total career			37	12	3	4	4	1	44	17

== See also ==
- List of Bermuda women's international footballers
