= Felicia Knox =

American soccer player (born 2001)

Personal information
- Full name: Felicia Marie Knox
- Date of birth: July 24, 2001 (age 25)
- Place of birth: Kansas City, Missouri, United States
- Height: 5 ft 5 in (1.65 m)
- Position: Midfielder

Team information
- Current team: Dallas Trinity
- Number: 6

Youth career
- Sporting Blue Valley

College career
Years	Team	Apps	(Gls)
2020–2023	Alabama Crimson Tide	87	(18)

Senior career*
Years	Team	Apps	(Gls)
2024–2025	Fort Lauderdale United	26	(1)
2025–2026	Spokane Zephyr	24	(4)
2026–	Dallas Trinity	0	(0)
- * Club domestic league appearances and goals as of 22:57, May 18, 2026 (UTC)

Felicia Marie Knox (born July 24, 2001) is an American professional soccer player who plays as a midfielder for USL Super League club Dallas Trinity FC. She played college soccer for the Alabama Crimson Tide and was named the SEC Midfielder of the Year in 2022. She was drafted by Angel City FC in the third round of the 2024 NWSL Draft. She has previously been a member of Fort Lauderdale United FC and Spokane Zephyr FC.

== Early life ==
Knox was born in Kansas City, Missouri, to Tom and Melissa Knox, and has three siblings. She was raised in Shawnee, Kansas, and attended Notre Dame de Sion School. She played club soccer for Sporting Blue Valley. She also played futsal growing up and was selected as captain for the first-ever United States national under-14 team in 2015.

== College career ==
Knox was a four-year starter for the Alabama Crimson Tide, recording 18 goals and 31 assists (the program assist record) in 87 appearances. She led the team with four goals in the abbreviated 2020 season, earning Southeastern Conference all-freshman honors. One of her three goals as a sophomore in 2021 was during their second-round loss to BYU in the NCAA tournament.

Knox led the country with 20 assists as a junior in 2022, most of them off corners or free kicks, and added eight goals. She helped lead her team to the final of the SEC tournament and its first semifinal at the NCAA championship, where they lost to eventual champions UCLA. She was pivotal in the third round of the NCAA tournament, scoring a brace to defeat UC Irvine. Despite playing through a hamstring injury, she was named the SEC Midfielder of the Year, third-team All-American, and NCAA all-tournament team. She was invited to play friendlies with the national under-23 team against NWSL clubs in the 2023 preseason. She became a team captain in her senior year in 2023, being named first-team All-SEC with four game-winning goals and six assists.

== Club career ==
=== Fort Lauderdale United ===
Knox was drafted by Angel City FC with the 37th overall pick in the third round of the 2024 NWSL Draft, but she was cut during preseason. On May 14, 2024, she was unveiled as the first player signed by Fort Lauderdale United before the USL Super League's inaugural season. She made her professional debut in the club's first-ever game, starting and assisting Addie McCain's equalizer in a 1–1 draw with the Spokane Zephyr. On October 27, she scored her first professional goal from a deep free kick in a 3–1 loss to Brooklyn FC. She finished her rookie season with 1 goal in 26 appearances.

=== Spokane Zephyr ===
On September 5, 2025, Knox signed with fellow USL Super League club Spokane Zephyr. The following day, she made her Zephyr debut in a 1–0 loss to her former club Fort Lauderdale United. On December 20, she scored her first goal for the Zephyr in a 3–1 win over Fort Lauderdale United. In her only season in Spokane, she played in 24 games and scored 4 goals. She scored a goal in the Zephyr's final game as they won 4–0 against Brooklyn FC but missed the playoffs by one point on the final day of the season. The club folded following the season.

=== Dallas Trinity ===
In August 2026, Knox joined Dallas Trinity FC.

== Career statistics ==
=== Club ===
As of August 4, 2026

Club	Season	League			Playoffs		Total	
Club	Season	Division	Apps	Goals	Apps	Goals	Apps	Goals
Fort Lauderdale United FC	2024–25	USL Super League	26	1	0	0	26	1
Spokane Zephyr FC	2025–26	USL Super League	24	4	—		24	4
Career total			50	5	0	0	50	15

== Honors and awards ==
Individual

- Third-team All-American: 2022
- SEC Midfielder of the Year: 2022
- First-team All-SEC: 2022, 2023
- NCAA tournament all-tournament team: 2022
- NCAA Division I assists leader: 2022
