= Madison McComasky =

Australian soccer player (born 1999)

Personal information
- Full name: Madison Daphne McComasky
- Date of birth: 25 September 1999 (age 27)
- Place of birth: Sydney, Australia
- Height: 1.80 m (5 ft 11 in)
- Position: Defender

Team information
- Current team: Durham
- Number: 4

Youth career
- Sydney City Eagles

College career
Years	Team	Apps	(Gls)
2018	Wayland Baptist Pioneers	16	(2)
2019	Northeast Texas Community College Eagles	15	(4)
2020–2021	Incarnate Word Cardinals	33	(1)

Senior career*
Years	Team	Apps	(Gls)
2022–2023	Macarthur Rams	42	(–)
2022–2023	Canberra United	6	(0)
2023–2025	Western Sydney Wanderers	32	(2)
2025–2026	Fort Lauderdale United	8	(1)
2026–	Durham	0	(0)
- * Club domestic league appearances and goals as of 18:43, 8 August 2026 (UTC)

Madison Daphne McComasky (born 25 September 1999) is an Australian professional soccer player who plays as a defender for Women's Super League 2 club Durham. She has previously been a member of Australian A-League clubs Western Sydney Wanderers FC and Canberra United FC, as well as USL Super League club Fort Lauderdale United FC.

== Early life ==
McComasky was born in Sydney, Australia and grew up in the suburb of Glenhaven. She is one of five siblings born to Keith and Glynis McComasky. She attended William Clarke College, playing futsal for both her school and club team Sydney City Eagles. After graduating from William Clarke, McComasky faced few prospects to advance her soccer career in Australia, leading her to move to the United States to play college soccer while continuing to receive an education.

== College career ==
In 2018, McComasky played her first year of college soccer for the Wayland Baptist Pioneers. She started all 16 matches of the season, scored twice, and helped the team record 5 shutouts (one short of a program record). Her performances earned her a spot on the All-Sooner second team and recognition as the Pioneers' Defensive Player of the Year. McComasky then moved to the Northeast Texas Community College. She registered 15 starts, 4 goals, and 4 assists before the college season was ended early due to the COVID-19 pandemic.

As a junior, McComasky transferred to the University of the Incarnate Word, where she played her first season of NCAA Division I soccer for the Cardinals. She made 12 appearances in the 2021 spring season before nearly doubling the figure the following campaign, playing in 21 games in the fall. In October 2021, she was included as an honorable mention for the Southland Conference Defensive Player of the Week award.

== Club career ==
=== Macarthur Rams and Canberra United ===
After finishing college, McComasky was contacted by former youth coach Stephen Peters about joining the Macarthur Rams of the National Premier Leagues. She accepted the offer and played for the Rams in the team's 2022 season, operating both as a midfielder and defender. In the NPL NSW championship match, an eventual win over the Northern Tigers on penalties, she played all 120 minutes and scored a "well-taken" penalty kick to help Macarthur claim the title.

McComasky's performances for the Rams caught the eye of top-flight Australian club Canberra United FC, who invited her to join the team on a trial period. McComasky's trial was a success, and she signed her first A-League contract with Canberra in November 2022. She made 6 appearances for the team as Canberra United fell short of the 2022–23 A-League finals series on goal difference.

Following her season with Canberra United, McComasky returned to the Macarthur Rams for a second stint. She participated in 23 games, helping the Rams win yet another Grand Final title.

=== Western Sydney Wanderers ===
On 24 July 2023, McComasky was announced to have signed a two-year contract with hometown club Western Sydney Wanderers FC. She made her Wanderers debut on 14 October, playing in Western Sydney's season-opening defeat to cross-town rivals Sydney FC. The start of McComasky's season was fraught with uncertainty due to a variety of coaching changes at the Wanderers. However, following the appointment of Robbie Hooker as head coach, McComasky gained confidence. She scored her first A-League goal on 13 March 2024, helping Western Sydney beat her former club, Canberra United, 4–1.

McComasky's second Wanderers goal instead came at the benefit of Canberra United; her tally in a 4–4 draw with the Brisbane Roar helped Canberra secure guaranteed passage to the 2024–25 Finals Series. It would prove to be her final goal and second-to-last appearance for Western Sydney, as she departed from the Wanderers at the end of the season in pursuit of playing opportunities overseas. She had made 32 appearances in her two seasons with the club.

=== Fort Lauderdale United ===
McComasky was announced to have signed for USL Super League club Fort Lauderdale United FC on 29 July 2025. Her move reunited her with former Wanderers teammate Sophie Harding, who had signed for Fort Lauderdale less than three weeks previously. On 15 November, she scored her first USLS goal, a stoppage-time equalizer, to steal a draw from Floridian rivals Tampa Bay Sun FC. McComasky's goal, combined with her defensive performances over five games, earned her a place on the Super League's November Team of the Month. She made a total of 8 appearances (7 starts) in her lone season at Fort Lauderdale.

=== Durham ===
In August 2026, McComasky joined English Women's Super League 2 club Durham, becoming the team's fifth signing of the summer.

== Honors and awards ==
Macarthur Rams

- National Premier Leagues NSW: 2022, 2023

Individual

- Second-team All-Sooner: 2018
