= Kelli Van Treeck =

American soccer player (born 2000)

Personal information
- Birth name: Kelli Elizabeth Beiler
- Date of birth: June 9, 2000 (age 26)
- Place of birth: Lancaster, Pennsylvania, U.S.
- Height: 5 ft 7 in (1.70 m)
- Position: Midfielder

Team information
- Current team: Fort Lauderdale United
- Number: 29

Youth career
- LDC United
- North Union United

College career
Years	Team	Apps	(Gls)
2018–2019	Penn State Nittany Lions	25	(0)
2020–2023	Lipscomb Bisons	51	(34)

Senior career*
Years	Team	Apps	(Gls)
2019	Cleveland Ambassadors	10	(7)
2022	Tennessee SC	1	(0)
2025–	Fort Lauderdale United	28	(4)
- * Club domestic league appearances and goals as of 03:36, May 18, 2026 (UTC)

Kelli Elizabeth Van Treeck (née Beiler; born June 9, 2000) is an American professional soccer player who plays as a midfielder for USL Super League club Fort Lauderdale United FC. She played college soccer for the Penn State Nittany Lions and the Lipscomb Bisons.

== Early life ==
Born in Lancaster, Pennsylvania, as one of five children to Jonas and Lisa Beiler, Van Treeck grew up in Mount Pleasant Mills. She played youth soccer for North Union United and LDC United. With North Union United, she was a four-time team captain and helped the U17 squad win the 2016 Club State Cup. Van Treeck attended Midd-West High School, where she played both soccer and basketball. With the soccer team, she scored 126 goals as a midfielder. She set the school's single-season goal record as a sophomore and broke it twice before graduating. She was a three-time all-state, two-time all-region, and two-time Midd-West Player of the Year honoree.

== College career ==
=== Penn State Nittany Lions ===
Van Treeck enrolled early at Pennsylvania State University, graduating from high school halfway through her senior year in order to participate in the Nittany Lions' spring training and matches. In her collegiate debut, she assisted Kerry Abello against Duquesne on August 19, 2018; although she would go on to score over 30 goals before finishing her college soccer career, it would prove to be Van Treeck's only collegiate assist. She played in 14 games, starting none of them, in her freshman season at Penn State.

In the summer before her sophomore year, Van Treeck played in the Women's Premier Soccer League for the Cleveland Ambassadors in a quest to improve her play. She scored 7 goals in 10 games. Despite also working one-on-one with Penn State head coach Erica Dambach over the offseason, Van Treeck was unable to earn a consistent role in 2019 and only played 186 total minutes. She departed from Penn State at the end of the year after having contributed to one Big Ten regular season title and one Big Ten tournament title.

=== Lipscomb Bisons ===
Van Treeck transferred to Lipscomb University ahead of her junior year. In the 2020 season, which had been postponed to the spring of 2021 due to the COVID-19 pandemic, she started 12 games and logged 9 goals, 4 of which were game-winners. 3 of her goals came in a first-half hat-trick against Kennesaw State in March 2021, the first of her college career. After suffering an injury early in the 2021 fall season, Van Treeck was forced to watch from the sidelines as Lipscomb won its third ASUN championship title in four years.

Van Treeck played her first minutes back from injury in the summer of 2022, making one appearance in the pre-professional USL W League for Tennessee SC. She had an impactful return season for Lipscomb, scoring nearly one-third of her entire team's goals (12). She was named the 2022 ASUN Scholar-Athlete of the year, becoming the fifth in Bison history. She would go on to win the same award the following year.

Van Treeck chose to exercise her extra year of NCAA eligibility to return to Lipscomb for a fourth season. Now playing as a forward, she ranked ninth in the nation for total goals (13) and fourth for game-winners. She departed from the program with three first-team All-ASUN honors, two all-region honors, and two ASUN Player of the Year awards.

== Club career ==
On July 25, 2025, USL Super League club Fort Lauderdale United FC announced that they had signed Van Treeck to her first professional contract ahead of the league's second season of play. Van Treeck scored her first pro goals on September 13, 2025, recording a brace in a 4–1 victory over the Dallas Trinity. She was later named to the USL Super League September Team of the Month after ranking second in the league in duels won and tackles won. Heading into the league's winter break, Van Treeck had become one of Fort Lauderdale United's leading goalscorers throughout the first half of the season; she was named to the USL Super League Team of the Month once again at the end of December 2025. She continued her good form past the league's winter break and ended up earning a spot on the USL Super League All-League Second Team at the end of the season.

== Personal life ==
She married Logan Van Treeck on December 9, 2023.

== Honors and awards ==
Penn State Nittany Lions

- Big Ten regular season: 2018
- Big Ten women's soccer tournament: 2019

Lipscomb Bison

- ASUN women's soccer tournament: 2021

Individual

- USL Super League All-League Second Team: 2025–26
- ASUN Player of the Year: 2022, 2023
- First-team All-ASUN: 2020, 2022, 2023
