= Fort Lauderdale United FC =

Women's soccer team in Fort Lauderdale, Florida

Fort Lauderdale United
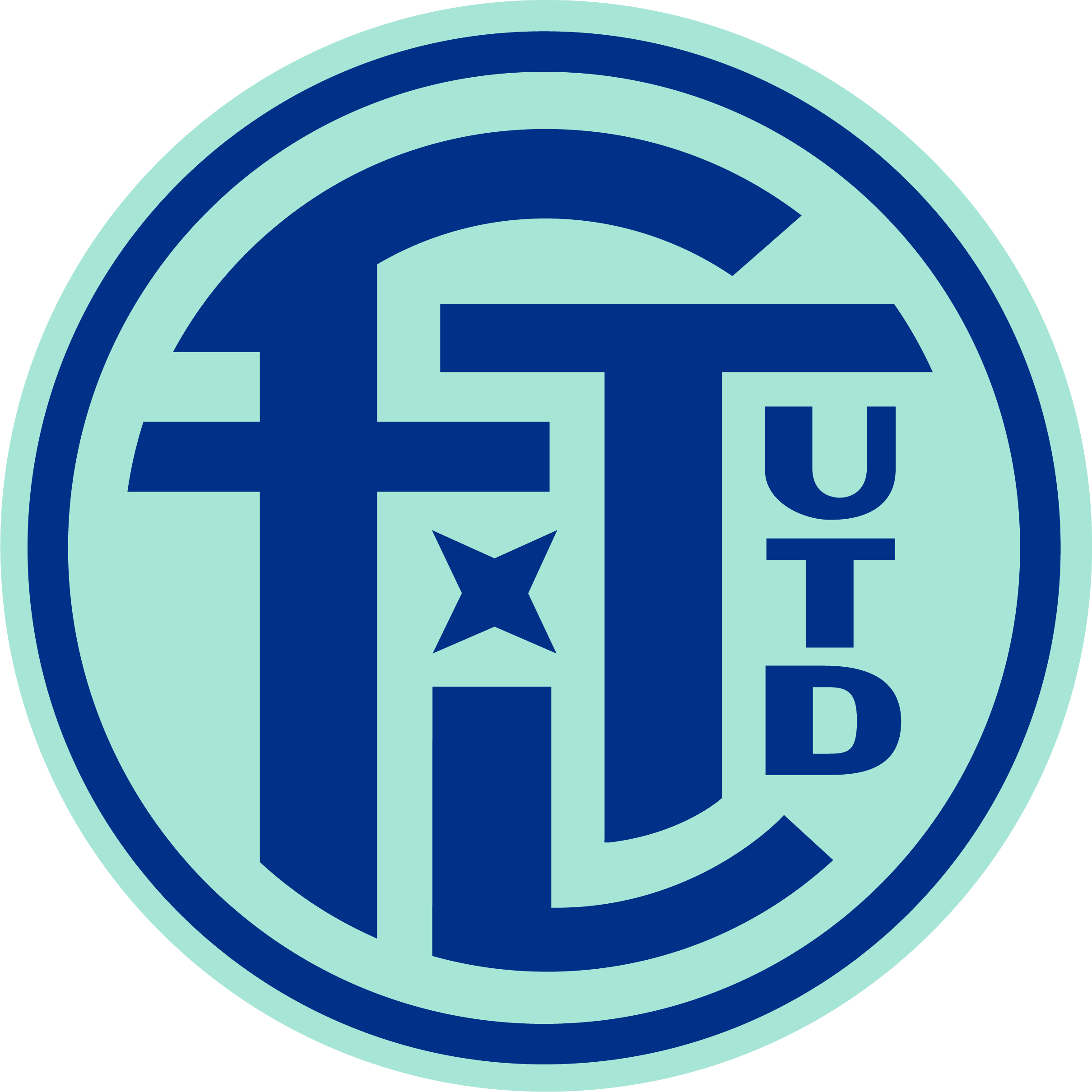
- Full name: Fort Lauderdale United Football Club
- Nickname: FTL UTD
- Founded: 21 November 2023; 2 years ago
- Stadium: Amerant Bank Field
- CEO: Tommy Smith
- Head coach: Tyrone Mears
- League: USL Super League
- 2025–26: USL Super League, 9th of 9
- Website: ftlutd.com
Home colors	Away colors	Third colors

Fort Lauderdale United FC is an American professional women's soccer club based in Broward County, Florida, that competes in the USL Super League (USLS). The team plays its home matches at a soccer-specific stadium at Nova Southeastern University.

The club is principally owned by Tommy Smith, who serves as chair and CEO.

== History ==
On November 21, 2023, the USL Super League announced that it had awarded a franchise to Fort Lauderdale, making it the first professional women's soccer team in South Florida.

On January 25, 2024, former Premier League and MLS player Tyrone Mears was announced as the team's first head coach. On May 14, 2024, Felicia Knox was revealed as the team's first ever signing after being drafted by Angel City FC in the 2024 NWSL Draft. One day later, the club welcomed defender Laveni Vaka who made history as Tonga's first female professional soccer player. On June 26, 2024, the club announced its full coaching staff, with Alissa Rogers as Associate Head Coach and former Fort Lauderdale Strikers star Aly Hassan as Director of Recruitment.

On April 29, 2025, the team announced the launch of a men's side that is set to play in USL League One in 2026.

In their inaugural season, Fort Lauderdale finished fourth in the table and qualified for the 2024–25 USL Super League playoffs. Fort Lauderdale went on to be Carolina Ascent 2–1 in extra time to advance to the Finals. Taking Tampa Bay Sun FC into extra-time in the final, Fort Lauderdale eventually fell 1–0, finishing Runners-up on the season.

== Stadium ==
In November 2024, the team's home stadium at Nova Southeastern University on the site of the former Miami Dolphins training facility was rebranded from NSU Soccer Field to Beyond Bancard Field. The $7 million project, which seats nearly 7,000 fans, is the result of a multi-year exclusive naming-rights agreement between FTL UTD and Beyond Bancard, a provider of payment-processing solutions.

In the fall of 2026, the stadium was renamed Amerant Bank Field ahead of the 2026 Gainbridge Super League Fall season.

== Identity ==
The name and crest were unveiled on February 29, 2024. The Fort Lauderdale United FC crest features the initials FTL prominently displayed, meant to intertwine like the canals of the city. The “glint” represents the vibrant sun bouncing off the waters the region is known for. The club’s colors represent Fort Lauderdale’s world-renowned beaches and shallow waters, with seafoam green contrasting the ocean blue.

== Sponsorship ==
Period	Kit manufacturer	Shirt sponsor	Sleeve sponsor	Ref.
2024–present	Nike	OMEGAXL SPORT	All Year Cooling & Heating	

== Players and staff ==
=== Current roster ===
As of November 11, 2026

Note: Flags indicate national team as defined under FIFA eligibility rules; some limited exceptions apply. Players may hold more than one non-FIFA nationality.

No.	Pos.	Nation	Player
1	GK	USA	Heather Hinz
2	DF	USA	Molly McDougal
3	MF	USA	Taylor Smith
4	DF	USA	Maggy Henschler
5	DF	USA	Maggie Mace
6	MF	USA	Amber Nguyen (on loan from Lexington SC)
7	FW	USA	Grace Cutler
8	MF	USA	Shea Moyer
9	DF	USA	Kelsey Oyler
10	FW	USA	Emily Thompson
11	FW	USA	Sh'Nia Gordon

No.	Pos.	Nation	Player
12	DF	USA	Haley Thomas
16	FW	USA	Abi Hugh
17	FW	USA	Farrah Walters
18	DF	USA	Ella Simpson
20	FW	USA	Kiara Locklear
27	DF	USA	Julia Grosso
29	MF	USA	Kelli Van Treeck
30	GK	USA	Haley Craig
31	GK	USA	Lauren Rodriguez
34	MF	USA	Jules Cagle
35	DF	COL	Daniela Todd

==== Academy players ====
Note: Flags indicate national team as defined under FIFA eligibility rules; some limited exceptions apply. Players may hold more than one non-FIFA nationality.

No.	Pos.	Nation	Player
21	MF	USA	Maya Buerger

=== Former players ===
For details of former players, see Category:Fort Lauderdale United FC players and List of Fort Lauderdale United FC players.

=== Staff ===
As of June 7, 2026

Front office
Position	Name
Founder & chairman	Tommy Smith
General manager	Aly Hassan
Chief financial officer	Stan Jansta
Technical staff
Head coach	Tyrone Mears
Goalkeeper coach	Paul Jennison
Technical coach	Ivan Arenas
Performance Analyst	Sergiu Bolboaca

== Records ==
=== Year-by-year ===
As of match played on March 28, 2026

Season	League	Regular season								Playoffs	Avg. attendance	Top Goalscorer	
Season	League	P	W	D	L	GF	GA	Pts	Pos	Playoffs	Name(s)	Goals	
2024–25	USLS	28	11	9	8	35	33	42	4th	Runners-up	2,306	(United States) Addie McCain	10
2025–26	USLS	21	4	8	9	24	41	20	9th	TBD	1,726	(United States) Kiara Locklear	5
Total		49	15	17	17	59	74	–	–	–	–	(United States) Kiara Locklear	12

=== Head coaching record ===
As of June 7, 2026

Only competitive matches are counted.*

All-time Fort Lauderdale United FC coaching records
Name	Nationality	From	To	P	W	D	L	GF	GA	Win%
Tyrone Mears	England	January 25, 2024	September 16, 2025	34	14	11	9	47	41	41.18%
Ali Rogers	United States	September 16, 2025	February 10, 2026	12	2	4	6	10	24	16.67%
Paul Jennison (interim)	England	February 11, 2026	June 6, 2026	12	0	2	10	10	32	0.00%
Tyrone Mears	England	June 6, 2026	present	0	0	0	0	0	0	0.00%

=== Team records ===
As of May 18, 2026. Current players in bold. Statistics are updated once a year after the conclusion of the USL Super League season.

Most appearances
Player					Appearances		
#	Name	Nat.	Pos.	United career	USLS	Playoffs	Total
1	**Sh'Nia Gordon**	(United States)	DF	2024–	56	2	58
2	**Taylor Smith**	(United States)	MF	2024–	52	2	54
3	Jasmine Hamid	(United States)	FW	2024–2026	45	2	47
4	**Kiara Locklear**	(United States)	FW	2024–	44	2	46
5	Darya Rajaee	(United States)	MF	2024–2026	37	2	39
6	Laurel Ansbrow	(United States)	DF	2025	29	2	31
6	**Laveni Vaka**	(Tonga)	DF	2024–	31	0	31
8	Addie McCain	(United States)	MF	2024–2025	28	2	30
9	**Julia Grosso**	(United States)	DF	2025–	27	2	29
10	**Kelli Van Treeck**	(United States)	MF	2025–	28	0	28

Top goalscorers
Player					Goals scored		
#	Name	Nat.	Pos.	United career	USLS	Playoffs	Total
1	Jasmine Hamid	(United States)	FW	2024–2026	13	0	13
1	**Kiara Locklear**	(United States)	FW	2024–	11	2	13
3	Addie McCain	(United States)	MF	2024–2025	10	0	10
4	**Sh'Nia Gordon**	(United States)	DF	2024–	7	0	7
5	**Kelli Van Treeck**	(United States)	MF	2025–	4	0	4
5	**Ella Simpson**	(United States)	DF	2025–	4	0	4
