= List of Spokane Zephyr FC players =

Spokane Zephyr FC was an American professional women's soccer club which spent two seasons in the USL Super League, beginning play in the league's inaugural season before folding after the 2025–26 season. All players who made a competitive appearance for Spokane Zephyr FC are listed below.

== Key ==
- The list is ordered alphabetically.
- Appearances as a substitute are included.
- Statistics are correct as of May 16, 2026, the end of the 2025–26 USL Super League season, and are updated once a year after the conclusion of the USL Super League season.

Positions key
GK	Goalkeeper
DF	Defender
MF	Midfielder
FW	Forward

Nationality
Unless otherwise noted, the nationality of a player is determined by the country they most recently represented in international play, or if said player has not played international football then by their country of birth.
Position
Playing positions are listed according to the player's roster designation as of the list's most recent update.
Years
Years are defined as the first and last calendar years in which the player was rostered for the club in any of the competitions listed below.
Appearances and goals
This list counts appearances and goals in the USL Super League and USL Super League playoffs.

== Players ==
Yrs	No.	Pos	Nat	Player	Total		USL Super League		Playoffs	
Yrs	No.	Pos	Nat	Player	Apps	Goals	Apps	Goals	Apps	Goals
2024–2025	2	MF	(United States) USA	Taylor Aylmer	24	4	24	4	0	0
2024–2025	25	MF	(Canada) CAN	Wayny Balata	10	0	10	0	0	0
2025–2026	22	DF	(United States) USA	Charley Boone	20	0	20	0	0	0
2024–2025	12	DF	(United States) USA	Alyssa Bourgeois	24	0	24	0	0	0
2024–2026	24	MF	(Argentina) ARG	Sophia Braun	46	0	46	0	0	0
2024–2025	23	MF	(United States) USA	Marley Canales (Note: Canales was the club's first-ever signing, announced on May 14, 2024.)	17	0	17	0	0	0
2024	9	DF	(United States) USA	Makena Carr	1	0	1	0	0	0
2025–2026	11	DF	(United States) USA	Shea Collins	11	0	11	0	0	0
2025–2026	33	FW	(United States) USA	Ally Cook	33	11	33	11	0	0
2024–2025	6	DF	(Guyana) GUY	Sydney Cummings	21	3	21	3	0	0
2025–2026	17	DF	(United States) USA	Madelyn Desiano	11	0	11	0	0	0
2024–2025	10	MF	(Bosnia and Herzegovina) BIH	Emina Ekic (Note: Ekic scored the club's first-ever goal, netting a penalty kick against Fort Lauderdale United FC on August 17, 2024.)	24	10	24	10	0	0
2025–2026	23	DF	(United States) USA	Ginger Fontenot	24	2	24	2	0	0
2026	14	FW	(United States) USA	Maya Hansen	10	1	10	1	0	0
2024–2026	0	GK	(United States) USA	Hope Hisey	49	0	49	0	0	0
2025–2026	6	FW	(Ecuador) ECU	Kaira Houser	3	0	3	0	0	0
2024–2026	3	MF	(United States) USA	Emma Jaskaniec	55	5	55	5	0	0
2025–2026	32	MF	(United States) USA	Maggie Johnston	12	0	12	0	0	0
2025–2026	16	MF	(United States) USA	Felicia Knox	24	4	24	4	0	0
2025	12	MF	(United States) USA	Aryssa Mahrt	15	0	15	0	0	0
2024–2026	5	DF	(United States) USA	Sarah McCoy	52	0	52	0	0	0
2024–2026	26	MF	(United States) USA	Katie Murray	33	3	33	3	0	0
2024–2026	1	GK	(United States) USA	Izzy Nino	7	0	7	0	0	0
2025–2026	7	DF	(United States) USA	Kelsey Oyler	27	0	27	0	0	0
2026	25	MF	(United States) USA	Catherine Rapp	9	2	9	2	0	0
2024–2026	30	FW	(Brazil) BRA	Thais Reiss	5	1	5	1	0	0
2024–2025	7	FW	(United States) USA	Taryn Ries	7	1	7	1	0	0
2024–2025	14	MF	(England) ENG	Mollie Rouse	13	1	13	1	0	0
2025–2026	8	FW	(United States) USA	Lena Silano	28	7	28	7	0	0
2024–2025	13	FW	(Panama) PAN	Riley Tanner	1	0	1	0	0	0
2025–2026	20	DF	(United States) USA	Reese Tappan	34	1	34	1	0	0
2024–2026	18	DF	(United States) USA	Haley Thomas	50	2	50	2	0	0
2025–2026	9	FW	(United States) USA	Cameron Tucker	19	1	19	1	0	0
2024–2025	8	FW	(United States) USA	Jodi Ülkekul	15	0	15	0	0	0
2024–2025	22	DF	(Canada) CAN	Julianne Vallerand	11	1	11	1	0	0
2025	21	MF	(United States) USA	Olivia Van der Jagt	4	0	4	0	0	0
2024–2025	4	FW	(United States) USA	Jenny Vetter	12	0	12	0	0	0
2024–2026	15	FW	(United States) USA	Natalie Viggiano	27	0	27	0	0	0
2025–2026	19	FW	(United States) USA	Tori Waldeck Zierenberg	20	4	20	4	0	0
2024–2025	21	FW	(United States) USA	McKenzie Weinert	25	3	25	3	0	0

== By nationality ==
In total, 40 players representing 9 different countries appeared for Spokane Zephyr FC.

Note: Countries indicate national team as defined under FIFA eligibility rules. Players may hold more than one non-FIFA nationality.

Country	Total players
Argentina	1
Bosnia and Herzegovina	1
Brazil	1
Canada	2
Ecuador	1
England	1
Guyana	1
Panama	1
United States	33

== See also ==
- List of top-division football clubs in CONCACAF countries
- List of professional sports teams in the United States and Canada
