= 2024–25 Spokane Zephyr FC season =

Current season for Spokane Zephyr professional soccer team

Spokane Zephyr FC
2024–25 season
- President: Katie Harnetiaux
- Head coach: Jo Johnson
- Stadium: ONE Spokane Stadium
- USL Super League: 5th
- Top goalscorer: League: All: Emina Ekic (10 goals)
- Highest home attendance: 5,086 vs Fort Lauderdale (August 17, 2024)
- Lowest home attendance: 2,013 vs DAL (April 12, 2025)
- Average home league attendance: 2,537
- Biggest win: 3–0 (vs DAL (H), April 12, 2025); 3–0 (vs Lexington SC (A), April 16, 2025)
- Biggest defeat: 0–3 (vs CAR (A), April 19, 2025)
- All statistics correct as of May 31, 2025.

The 2024–25 Spokane Zephyr FC season was the first season in Spokane Zephyr FC history. The team competed in the inaugural season of the USL Super League.

== Players & Staff ==
=== Staff ===
As of July 25, 2024

Spokane Zephyr FC staff
President, USL Spokane	Katie Harnetiaux
Director of Operations and Player Administration	Emma Hayes
Head coach	Jo Johnson
Assistant/Goalkeeping coach	Brian Periman
Director of Performance	Josh McAllister

=== Current roster ===
As of August 15, 2024

Note: Flags indicate national team as defined under FIFA eligibility rules; some limited exceptions apply. Players may hold more than one non-FIFA nationality.

No.	Pos.	Nation	Player
0	GK	USA	Hope Hisey
1	GK	USA	Izzy Nino
2	MF	USA	Taylor Aylmer
3	MF	USA	Emma Jaskaniec
4	FW	USA	Jenny Vetter
5	DF	USA	Sarah Clark
6	DF	GUY	Sydney Cummings
7	FW	USA	Taryn Ries
8	FW	USA	Jodi Ülkekul
9	DF	USA	Makena Carr
10	MF	BIH	Emina Ekić
11	FW	USA	Alyssa Walker
12	DF	USA	Alyssa Bourgeois

No.	Pos.	Nation	Player
13	FW	PAN	Riley Tanner
14	MF	ENG	Mollie Rouse
15	DF	USA	Natalie Viggiano
18	DF	USA	Haley Thomas
21	FW	USA	McKenzie Weinert
22	DF	CAN	Julianne Vallerand
23	MF	USA	Marley Canales
24	MF	ARG	Sophia Braun (on loan from KC Current)
25	MF	CAN	Wayny Balata
26	MF	USA	Katie Murray
30	FW	BRA	Thais Reiss
31	GK	USA	Hailey Coll
33	FW	USA	Ally Cook

== Transfers ==
=== In ===
Date	Pos.	Player	Transferred from	Fee	Ref.
May 14, 2024	MF	(United States) Marley Canales	(United States) Seattle Reign FC	Free transfer	
May 16, 2024	DF	(United States) Makena Carr	(United States) Seattle Reign FC	Free transfer	
May 16, 2024	MF	(Canada) Wayny Balata	(United States) Southern Methodist University	Free transfer	
May 21, 2024	MF	(United States) Taylor Aylmer	(United States) Racing Louisville FC	Free transfer	
May 23, 2024	MF	(United States) Emma Jaskaniec	(United States) Utah Royals	Free transfer	
May 23, 2024	DF	(Canada) Julianne Vallerand	(United States) West Virginia University	Free transfer	
May 28, 2024	DF	(United States) Sarah Clark	(Australia) Canberra United FC	Free transfer	
June 4, 2024	FW	(United States) Jodi Ülkekul	(United States) Seattle Reign FC	Free transfer	
June 7, 2024	DF	(United States) Alyssa Bourgeois	(United States) Houston Dash	Free transfer	
June 7, 2024	FW	(United States) Jenny Vetter	(Portugal) Racing Power FC	Free transfer	
June 11, 2024	MF	(England) Mollie Rouse	(England) Sunderland AFC	Free transfer	
June 13, 2024	GK	(United States) Hailey Coll	(United States) Seattle Reign FC	Free transfer	
June 13, 2024	GK	(United States) Izzy Nino	(Australia) Newcastle Jets FC	Free transfer	
June 18, 2024	FW	(Brazil) Thais Reiss	(Spain) Villarreal CF	Free transfer	
June 20, 2024	FW	(United States) Taryn Ries	(Germany) MSV Duisburg	Free transfer	
June 20, 2024	DF	(United States) Haley Thomas	(Germany) MSV Duisburg	Free transfer	
June 24, 2024	FW	(United States) Alyssa Walker	(Denmark) HB Køge	Free transfer	
June 26, 2024	FW	(Panama) Riley Tanner	(United States) Washington Spirit	Free transfer	
June 27, 2024	DF	(Guyana) Sydney Cummings	(Scotland) Celtic FC	Free transfer	
June 28, 2024	MF	(United States) Katie Murray	(Netherlands) PEC Zwolle	Free transfer	
July 17, 2024	MF	(United States) Emina Ekić	(Australia) Melbourne City FC	Free transfer	
July 19, 2024	MF	(United States) Sophia Braun	(United States) Kansas City Current	On loan	
August 14, 2024	GK	(United States) Hope Hisey	(United States) Kansas City Current	Free transfer	
August 14, 2024	FW	(United States) Natalie Viggiano	(Iceland) Íþróttabandalag Vestmannaeyja W	Free transfer	
August 15, 2024	FW	(United States) McKenzie Weinert	(United States) Seattle Reign FC	On loan	
January 17, 2025	FW	(United States) Ally Cook	(United States) Chicago Red Stars	Free Transfer	

== Competitions ==
Win Draw Loss

=== USL Super League ===
Source:

=== 2024 regular season ===
==== Results summary ====
Overall								Home						Away					
Pld	W	D	L	GF	GA	GD	Pts	W	D	L	GF	GA	GD	W	D	L	GF	GA	GD
28	11	9	8	37	32	+5	42	7	3	4	21	16	+5	4	6	4	16	16	0

Last updated: May 31, 2025.
Source: USLSuperLeague.com

==== League Table ====
Pos	Team	Pld	W	L	T	GF	GA	GD	Pts	Qualification
3	Dallas Trinity	28	12	9	7	42	30	+12	43	Playoffs
4	Fort Lauderdale United	28	11	8	9	35	33	+2	42 (Note: Head-to-head points: Fort Lauderdale 6, Spokane 3)	Playoffs
5	Spokane Zephyr	28	11	8	9	37	32	+5	42	
6	Brooklyn	28	10	9	9	30	34	−4	39	
7	DC Power	28	5	14	9	24	41	−17	24	

Source: USL Super League
Rules for classification: 1) head-to-head points; 2) total goal differential; 3) total goals scored; 4) disciplinary points; 5) drawing of lots.
Notes:

August 17, 2024 1	Spokane Zephyr FC	1–1	Fort Lauderdale United FC	Spokane
6:00 PM PDT	Ekić 17' (pen.); Aylmer (yellow card) 32'; Ekić (yellow card) 69'; Bourgeois (yellow card) 79'	Report	Allen (yellow card) 32'; McCain 72'; Mears (yellow card) 78'	Stadium: ONE Spokane Stadium; Attendance: 5,086; Referee: Rebecca Pagan

September 8, 2024 2	Spokane Zephyr FC	1–1	Brooklyn FC	Spokane
6:00 PM PDT	Ries (yellow card) 16', (goal) 35'; Canales (yellow card) 61'; Ulkekul (yellow card) 76'; Nino (yellow card) 86'	Report	Garziano 87'	Stadium: ONE Spokane Stadium; Attendance: 2,151; Referee: Adorae Monroy

September 15, 2024 3	Spokane Zephyr FC	0–2	Carolina Ascent FC	Spokane
6:00 PM PDT	Murray (yellow card) 21'; Canales (yellow card) 44'; Weinert (yellow card) 83'	Report	Corbin 30'; Studer 45+3'; Porter (yellow card) 48'; Bruce (yellow card) 48'; McGrew (yellow card) 84'	Stadium: ONE Spokane Stadium; Attendance: 2,448; Referee: Jamie Padilla

September 22, 2024 4	Spokane Zephyr FC	1–0	DC Power FC	Spokane
2:00 PM PDT	Thomas 17'; Ekić (yellow card) 25'; Diorio (yellow card) 67'; Guillou (yellow card) 69'	Report	Friedrichs (yellow card) 36'; Cudjoe (yellow card) 44'	Stadium: ONE Spokane Stadium; Attendance: 2,384; Referee: Jaclyn Metz

September 29, 2024 5	DC Power FC	2–2	Spokane Zephyr FC	Washington, D.C.
11:00 AM PDT	Wolfbauer 6', 43' (pen.), (yellow card) 86'; Guillou (yellow card) 23'; Friedrichs (yellow card) 47'; Bagley (yellow card) 50'	Report	Thomas (yellow card) 5'; Aylmer 6', (yellow card) 60'; DiOrio 70' (o.g.)	Stadium: Audi Field; Attendance: 850; Referee: Shawn Tehini

October 6, 2024 6	Spokane Zephyr FC	1–2	Dallas Trinity FC	Spokane
2:00 PM PDT	Braun (yellow card) 40'; Aylmer (yellow card) 62', (goal) 73'; bench (yellow card) 90+6'	Report	Davison 36'; Guillen (yellow card) 41'; Brian 58'	Stadium: ONE Spokane Stadium; Attendance: 2,554; Referee: Laura Rodriguez

October 13, 2024 7	Spokane Zephyr FC	2–3	Lexington SC	Spokane
2:00 PM PDT	Jaskaniec 37'; Ekić 58'; Bourgeois (yellow card) 90+7'	Report	Moyer 18'; McGuire 48'; Courtney Jones (yellow card) 59'; Shepherd 90+4'	Stadium: ONE Spokane Stadium; Attendance: 2,314; Referee: Kelsey Harms

October 27, 2024 8	Spokane Zephyr FC	1–0	Tampa Bay Sun FC	Spokane
2:00 PM PDT	Viggiano (yellow card) 14'; Canales 64'; Murray (yellow card) 76'	Report	Bessette (yellow card) 90+6'	Stadium: One Spokane Stadium; Attendance: 2,430; Referee: Danielle Chesky

October 31, 2024 9	Brooklyn FC	1–0	Spokane Zephyr FC	New York
4:30 PM PDT	Grabias 14', (yellow card) 84'; Cox (yellow card) 86'; Elmore (yellow card) 88'	Report	Ayler (yellow card) 13'; Cummings (yellow card) 55'; Weinert (yellow card) 84'	Stadium: Commisso Soccer Stadium; Attendance: 699; Referee: Ekaterina Koroleva
Note: Match originally scheduled for November 2, 2024 but changed due to field issues at Maimonides Park

November 9, 2024 10	Carolina Ascent FC	0–0	Spokane Zephyr FC	Charlotte
7:00 PM EST	Baisden (yellow card) 69'	Report		Stadium: American Legion Memorial Stadium; Attendance: 5,018; Referee: Eric Tattersall

November 13, 2024 11	Lexington SC	1–1	Spokane Zephyr FC	Lexington
7:00 PM EST	McGuire 86'	Report	Ekić 26' (pen.); Bourgeois (yellow card) 65'; Viggiano (yellow card) 71'	Stadium: Lexington SC Stadium; Attendance: 1,342; Referee: Benjamin Meyer

November 20, 2024 12	Dallas Trinity FC	0–0	Spokane Zephyr FC	Dallas
5:00 PM CST	Brian (yellow card) 21'; Dorsey (yellow card) 34'	Report		Stadium: Cotton Bowl; Attendance: 2,390; Referee: Trevor Wiseman

December 7, 2024 13	Fort Lauderdale United FC	2–1	Spokane Zephyr FC	Fort Lauderdale
4:30 PM EST	McCain 9'; Allen 84'; Locklear (yellow card) 87'	Report	Rouse 90+1'	Stadium: Nova Southeastern University soccer stadium Attendance: 1,965; Referee: Shawn Tehini

December 14, 2024 14	Tampa Bay Sun FC	3–2	Spokane Zephyr FC	Tampa
4:00 PM EST	Giammona 15'; Moore (yellow card) 39'; Flint 66', 69'; Hauksdóttir (yellow card) 89'; Edmonds (yellow card) 90+6'	Report	Thomas 22'; Weinert (yellow card) 36'; Vallerand 52'	Stadium: Riverfront Stadium; Attendance: 3,164; Referee: Edson Carvajal

February 22, 2025 15	Dallas Trinity FC	0–1	Spokane Zephyr FC	Dallas
2:00 PM PT	Walker (yellow card) 25'; Ubogagu (yellow card) 52'	Report	Murray 15'; Viggiano (yellow card) 72'; Vallerand (yellow card) 80'; Cook (yellow card) 90'	Stadium: Cotton Bowl (stadium); Attendance: 1,662; Referee: Corbyn May

March 8, 2025 16	Spokane Zephyr FC	1–2	Carolina Ascent FC	Spokane
7:00 PM PST	Cook 85' (pen.)	Report	Hutchinson 5'; Butler 30'; Troccoli (yellow card) 56'; Porter (yellow card) 69'; Bruce (yellow card) 79'	Stadium: ONE Spokane Stadium; Attendance: 2,015; Referee: Iryna Petrunok

March 15, 2025 17	Spokane Zephyr FC	3–2	DC Power FC	Spokane
2:00 PM PDT	Murray 36'; Ekic 66' (pen.) 90+3'	Report	Bagley 50'; Gourley 63'	Stadium: ONE Spokane Stadium; Attendance: 2,073; Referee: Kelsey Harms

March 19, 2025 18	Tampa Bay Sun FC	1–2	Spokane Zephyr FC	Tampa
4:00 PM EDT	Flint 89' (yellow card) 90+1'	Report	Braun (yellow card) 30'; Murray (yellow card) 38'; Aylmer 61'; Tappan (yellow card) 88'; Cook 90+3'	Stadium: Riverfront Stadium (Tampa); Attendance: 2,401; Referee: Alyssa Nichols

March 22, 2025 19	Fort Lauderdale United FC	0–0	Spokane Zephyr FC	Fort Lauderdale
4:30 PM EDT	Gaynor (yellow card) 9'; Lindahl (yellow card) 50'	Report		Stadium: FTL UTD Stadium; Attendance: 2,070; Referee: Marie Durr

April 3, 2025 20	Spokane Zephyr FC	1–0	Brooklyn FC	Spokane
6:00 PM PDT	Weinert 51'	Report		Stadium: ONE Spokane Stadium; Attendance: 2,044

April 12, 2025 21	Spokane Zephyr FC	3–0	Dallas Trinity FC	Spokane
6:00 PM PDT	Cook 55'; Cummings 58'; Jaskaniec (yellow card) 71'; Murray 84'; Bourgeois (yellow card) 86'	Report		Stadium: ONE Spokane Stadium; Attendance: 2,013; Referee: Adorae Monroy

April 16, 2025 22	Lexington SC	0–3	Spokane Zephyr FC	Lexington
4:00 PM EDT		Report	Cummings 6', (yellow card) 44'; Ekic 13' 50'	Stadium: Lexington SC Stadium; Attendance: 1,157; Referee: Matthew Thompson

April 19, 2025 23	Carolina Ascent FC	3–0	Spokane Zephyr FC	Charlotte
4:00 PM EDT	Hutchinson 17', 69'; Corbin 83'	Report	Murray (yellow card) 84'	Stadium: American Legion Memorial Stadium; Attendance: 2,565; Referee: Alejo Calume

April 26, 2025 24	Spokane Zephyr FC	3–2	Tampa Bay Sun FC	Spokane
2:00 PM PDT	Aylmer 14'; Weinert 25', 68'; Haley Thomas (yellow card) 71'; Hisey (yellow card) 81'	Report	Nasello 27'; Bessette (yellow card) 46'; Flint 78' (pen.)	Stadium: ONE Spokane Stadium; Attendance: 2,248; Referee: Gloria Martinez

May 3, 2025 25	Spokane Zephyr FC	2–0	Lexington SC	Spokane
6:00 PM PDT	Ekic 11' (pen.); Cook 50'; Weinert (yellow card) 86'	Report	López (yellow card) 59'	Stadium: ONE Spokane Stadium; Attendance: 2,158; Referee: Lauren Aldrich

May 10, 2025 26	Brooklyn FC	2–2	Spokane Zephyr FC	Brooklyn
3:00 PM EDT	Garziano 9'; Kelly 17'; Pantuso (yellow card) 45+1'; Hansen (red card) 71'	Report	Cummings 74'; Cook (yellow card) 76', (goal) 90+2'	Stadium: Maimonides Park; Attendance: 1,882; Referee: Marie Durr

May 13, 2025 27	DC Power FC	1–2	Spokane Zephyr FC	Washington, D.C.
4:30 PM EDT	Murnin (yellow card) 61'; Aquino (yellow card) 69'; Wolfbauer 74' (pen.)	Report	Ekic 65', 84'; Cummings (yellow card) 73'	Stadium: Audi Field; Attendance: 957; Referee: Alexandra Billeter

May 31, 2025 28	Spokane Zephyr FC	1–1	Fort Lauderdale United FC	Spokane
6:00 PM PDT	Cook 10'; Aylmer (yellow card) 24'; Bourgeois (yellow card) 88'	Report	Gordon 8'; Allen (yellow card) 21'; Ansbrow (yellow card) 83'; Rajaee (yellow card) 90+1'	Stadium: ONE Spokane Stadium; Attendance: 3,596; Referee: Adorae Monroy

== Statistics ==
=== Squad appearances ===
As of final match 31 May 2025

No.	Nat.	Player	Total		Regular Season		Playoffs	
No.	Nat.	Player	Apps	Starts	Apps	Starts	Apps	Starts
Goalkeepers
0	(United States)	Hope Hisey	21	21	21	21	DNQ	
1	(United States)	Izzy Nino	7	7	7	7	DNQ	
31	(United States)	Hailey Coll	0	0	0	0	DNQ	
Defenders
5	(United States)	Sarah Clark	28	28	28	28	DNQ	
6	(Guyana)	Sydney Cummings	21	21	21	21	DNQ	
9	(United States)	Makena Carr	1	1	1	1	DNQ	
12	(United States)	Alyssa Bourgeois	24	18	24	18	DNQ	
15	(United States)	Natalie Viggiano	27	12	27	12	DNQ	
18	(United States)	Haley Thomas	26	25	25	24	DNQ	
20	(United States)	Reese Tappan	6	2	6	2	DNQ	
22	(Canada)	Julianne Vallerand	11	6	11	6	DNQ	
Midfielders
2	(United States)	Taylor Aylmer	24	23	24	23	DNQ	
3	(United States)	Emma Jaskaniec	27	21	27	21	DNQ	
10	(Bosnia and Herzegovina)	Emina Ekič	24	23	24	23	DNQ	
14	(England)	Mollie Rouse	12	3	12	3	DNQ	
23	(United States)	Marley Canales	16	12	16	12	DNQ	
24	(Argentina)	Sophia Braun	22	14	22	14	DNQ	
25	(Canada)	Wayny Balata	10	3	10	3	DNQ	
26	(United States)	Katie Murray	25	21	25	21	DNQ	
Forwards
4	(United States)	Jenny Vetter	11	3	11	3	DNQ	
7	(United States)	Taryn Ries	6	6	6	5	DNQ	
8	(United States)	Jodi Ülkekul	15	0	15	0	DNQ	
11	(United States)	Alyssa Walker	1	0	1	0	DNQ	
13	(Panama)	Riley Tanner	1	0	1	0	DNQ	
21	(United States)	McKenzie Weinert	25	24	25	24	DNQ	
30	(Brazil)	Thais Reiss	1	1	1	1	DNQ	
33	(United States)	Ally Cook	15	14	15	14	DNQ	
Other players (Departed during season)

=== Goal scorers ===
As of final match 31 May 2025

Nat	Player	USLS Season	Total
(Bosnia and Herzegovina)	Emina Ekić	10	10
(United States)	Ally Cook	6	6
(United States)	Taylor Aylmer	4	4
(United States)	McKenzie Weinert	3	3
(United States)	Katie Murray	3	3
(United States)	Haley Thomas	2	2
(Guyana)	Sydney Cummings	3	3
(United States)	Marley Canales	1	1
(United States)	Emma Jaskaniec	1	1
(United States)	Taryn Ries	1	1
(England)	Mollie Rouse	1	1
(Canada)	Julianne Vallerand	1	1
Total		32	32

=== Assists ===
As of final match 31 May 2025

Nat	Player	USLS Season	Total
(Bosnia and Herzegovina)	Emina Ekić	6	6
(United States)	Emma Jaskaniec	3	3
(United States)	Haley Thomas	2	2
(United States)	Alyssa Bourgeois	2	2
(United States)	Katie Murray	2	2
(United States)	Sarah Clark	1	1
(United States)	McKenzie Weinert	1	1
(United States)	Ally Cook	1	1
(United States)	Natalie Viggiano	1	1
Total		18	18

=== Clean sheets ===
As off final match 31 May 2025

Nat	Player	USLS Season	Total
(United States)	Hope Hisey	9	9
(United States)	Izzy Nino	1	1
Total		10	10

=== Disciplinary record ===
As of final match 31 May 2025

No.	Nat.	Player	USL Super League Regular Season			Total		
No.	Nat.	Player	Booked	(yellow card) (yellow-red card)	Sent off (straight red)	Booked	(yellow card) (yellow-red card)	Sent off (straight red)
0	(United States)	Hope Hisey	1	0	0	1	0	0
1	(United States)	Izzy Nino	1	0	0	1	0	0
2	(United States)	Taylor Aylmer	5	0	0	5	0	0
3	(United States)	Emma Jaskaniec	2	0	0	2	0	0
5	(United States)	Sarah Clark	0	0	0	0	0	0
6	(Guyana)	Sydney Cummings	3	0	0	3	0	0
7	(United States)	Taryn Ries	1	0	0	1	0	0
8	(United States)	Jodi Ülkekul	1	0	0	1	0	0
9	(United States)	Makena Carr	0	0	0	0	0	0
10	(Bosnia and Herzegovina)	Emina Ekić	2	0	0	2	0	0
11	(United States)	Alyssa Walker	0	0	0	0	0	0
12	(United States)	Alyssa Bourgeois	4	0	0	4	0	0
13	(Panama)	Riley Tanner	0	0	0	0	0	0
14	(England)	Mollie Rouse	0	0	0	0	0	0
15	(United States)	Natalie Viggiano	3	0	0	3	0	0
18	(United States)	Haley Thomas	2	0	0	2	0	0
20	(United States)	Reese Tappan	1	0	0	1	0	0
21	(United States)	McKenzie Weinert	5	0	0	5	0	0
22	(Canada)	Julianne Vallerand	1	0	0	1	0	0
23	(United States)	Marley Canales	2	0	0	2	0	0
24	(Argentina)	Sophia Braun	2	0	0	2	0	0
25	(Canada)	Wayny Balata	0	0	0	0	0	0
26	(United States)	Katie Murray	4	0	0	4	0	0
30	(Brazil)	Thais Reiss	0	0	0	0	0	0
31	(United States)	Hailey Coll	0	0	0	0	0	0
33	(United States)	Ally Cook	2	0	0	2	0	0
Total			42	0	0	42	0	0
