= 2023 OL Reign season =

OL Reign
2023 season
- Majority owner: OL Groupe
- CEO: Vincent Berthillot
- Head coach: Laura Harvey
- Stadium: Lumen Field
- NWSL: 4th of 12
- Playoffs: Runners-up
- Challenge Cup: Semifinals
- Top goalscorer: League: Bethany Balcer (6); All: Bethany Balcer; Jordyn Huitema (7)
- Highest home attendance: 42,054 (vs. POR, June 3 doubleheader); 34,130 (vs. WSH, Oct. 6)
- Lowest home attendance: 3,906 (vs. LOU, Sep. 6)
- Average home league attendance: 13,609
Home colors	Away colors

The 2023 OL Reign season was the team's eleventh season of play and their eleventh season in the National Women's Soccer League (NWSL), the top division of women's soccer in the United States.

On October 6, 2023, the club set a NWSL record for standalone attendance with 34,130 spectators at Lumen Field for a regular season match against the Washington Spirit. The match was the final home game for Megan Rapinoe, who announced her intent to retire at the end of the season.

== Team ==
=== Coaching staff ===
As of August 11, 2023.

Position	Name
Head coach	Laura Harvey
Head assistant coach	Scott Parkinson
Assistant coach	Kate Norton
Goalkeeper coach	Ljupčo Kmetovski

=== Roster ===
As of September 21, 2023.

No.	Nat.	Name	Date of birth (age)	Since	Previous team	Notes (Note: denotes a season-ending injury.)
Goalkeepers
18	(United States)	Laurel Ivory	August 28, 1999 (aged 23)	2022	(United States) Virginia Cavaliers	
28	(United States)	Maia Pérez	October 19, 1999 (aged 23)	2023	(France) GPSO 92 Issy	
30	(United States)	Claudia Dickey	January 6, 2000 (aged 23)	2022	(United States) North Carolina Tar Heels	
Defenders
2	(United States)	Emily Sonnett	November 25, 1993 (aged 29)	2023	(United States) Washington Spirit	
3	(United States)	Lauren Barnes (captain)	May 31, 1989 (aged 33)	2013	(United States) Philadelphia Independence	
4	(United States)	Alana Cook	April 11, 1997 (aged 25)	2021	(France) Paris Saint-Germain	
11	(United States)	Sofia Huerta	December 14, 1992 (aged 30)	2020	(Australia) Sydney FC	
14	(Mexico)	Jimena López	January 30, 1999 (aged 24)	2021	(Spain) SD Eibar	INT, LOA
17	(United States)	Sam Hiatt	January 6, 1998 (aged 25)	2020	(United States) Stanford Cardinal	
20	(United States)	Alyssa Malonson	April 9, 1999 (aged 23)	2022	(United States) Auburn Tigers	
21	(United States)	Phoebe McClernon	December 13, 1997 (aged 25)	2022	(United States) Orlando Pride	
22	(United States)	Ryanne Brown	January 21, 1999 (aged 24)	2022	(United States) Wake Forest Demon Deacons	
25	(United States)	Shae Holmes	March 8, 2000 (aged 23)	2023	(United States) Washington Huskies	
Midfielders
5	(Canada)	Quinn	August 11, 1995 (aged 27)	2019	(France) Paris FC	
6	(Brazil)	Angelina	January 26, 2000 (aged 23)	2021	(Brazil) Palmeiras	
7	(United States)	Nikki Stanton	October 26, 1990 (aged 32)	2022	(United States) Chicago Red Stars	
10	(Wales)	Jess Fishlock	January 14, 1987 (aged 36)	2013	(England) Bristol Academy	
12	(United States)	Olivia Athens	August 1, 1998 (aged 24)	2022	(United States) UCLA Bruins	
13	(United States)	Marley Canales	November 16, 1997 (aged 25)	2022	(United States) UCLA Bruins	
16	(United States)	Rose Lavelle	May 14, 1995 (aged 27)	2021	(England) Manchester City	
19	(Brazil)	Luany	February 3, 2003 (aged 20)	2023	(Brazil) Grêmio	INT, LOA
33	(United States)	Olivia Van der Jagt	July 21, 1999 (aged 23)	2022	(United States) Washington Huskies	
Forwards
8	(United States)	Bethany Balcer	March 7, 1997 (aged 26)	2019	(United States) Spring Arbor Cougars	
9	(Canada)	Jordyn Huitema	May 8, 2001 (aged 21)	2022	(France) Paris Saint-Germain	INT
15	(United States)	Megan Rapinoe	July 5, 1985 (aged 37)	2013	(France) Lyon	
23	(United States)	Tziarra King	August 24, 1998 (aged 24)	2021	(United States) Utah Royals	
24	(United States)	Veronica Latsko	December 12, 1995 (aged 27)	2022	(United States) Houston Dash	
34	(United States)	Elyse Bennett	December 27, 1999 (aged 23)	2023	(United States) Kansas City Current	

== Competitions ==
Win Tie Loss

All times are in PT unless otherwise noted.

=== Preseason and friendlies ===
February 25, 2023	OL Reign	3–1	Club América	Tukwila, Washington
7:30 pm	King 11'; Rodríguez 45+1' (o.g.); Weinert 89'	Report	Palacios 74'	Stadium: Starfire Stadium; Attendance: 2,666; Referee: Karen Callado

==== Thorns Preseason Tournament ====
March 12, 2023	OL Reign	3–0	United States U-23	Portland, Oregon
2:30 pm	Balcer 16', 32'; Flynn 57' (o.g.); Sonnett (yellow card) 72'	Report		Stadium: Providence Park

March 15, 2023	OL Reign	0–2	Racing Louisville FC	Portland, Oregon
5:00 pm		Report	Fischer 50'; McDonald 65'	Stadium: Providence Park

March 18, 2023	Portland Thorns FC	0–1	OL Reign	Portland, Oregon
7:30 pm	Sugita (yellow card) 33'; Coffey (yellow card) 58'	Report	Fishlock 18' (yellow card) 53'	Stadium: Providence Park

=== Regular season ===
March 26, 2023 1	Washington Spirit	1–0	OL Reign	Washington, D.C.
1:00 pm	Hatch (yellow card) 20'; Sullivan (yellow card) 45+4'; Rodman 54'; Sheva (yellow card) 88'	Box; Report	Sonnett (yellow card) 42'	Stadium: Audi Field; Attendance: 11,281; Referee: Alyssa Nichols

April 1, 2023 2	NJ/NY Gotham FC	0–2	OL Reign	Harrison, New Jersey
4:30 pm	Long (yellow card) 75'; Purce (yellow card) 75'	Box; Report	Fishlock 31'; Balcer 62'	Stadium: Red Bull Arena; Attendance: 7,534; Referee: Brad Jensen

April 15, 2023 3	OL Reign	1–0	San Diego Wave FC	Seattle, Washington
7:00 pm	Van der Jagt 90+5'	Box; Report	Hill (yellow card) 90+4'	Stadium: Lumen Field; Attendance: 9,219; Referee: Tori Penso

April 22, 2023 4	OL Reign	5–2	Chicago Red Stars	Seattle, Washington
12:30 pm	Balcer 15', 20'; Rapinoe (yellow card) 21' (goal) 73'; Fishlock 45+5', 76'; Harvey (yellow card) 76'	Box; Report	Wright 32'; Schlegel 46'; Bike (yellow card) 85'; Milazzo (yellow card) 90+2'	Stadium: Lumen Field; Attendance: 6,186; Referee: JC Griggs

April 29, 2023 5	Racing Louisville FC	2–2	OL Reign	Louisville, Kentucky
4:30 pm	Monaghan 7'; DeMelo (yellow card) 35' (yellow-red card) 73' (goal) 45'; Milliet (yellow card) 46'	Box; Report	Rapinoe 69' (pen.); Huerta (yellow card) 71'; Stanton (yellow card) 87'; Huitema 90'	Stadium: Lynn Family Stadium; Attendance: 6,185; Referee: Eric Tattersall

May 6, 2023 6	OL Reign	2–0	Houston Dash	Seattle, Washington
7:00 pm	Latsko 53'; Huitema 68'; Stanton (yellow card) 90+3'	Box; Report		Stadium: Lumen Field; Attendance: 6,132; Referee: Brandon Stevis

May 14, 2023 7	North Carolina Courage	1–0	OL Reign	Cary, North Carolina
12:00 pm	Lussi 34'; Williams (yellow card) 83'	Box; Report	Huerta (yellow card) 42'; Rapinoe (yellow card) 75'	Stadium: WakeMed Soccer Park; Attendance: 4,059; Referee: Alex Billeter

May 21, 2023 8	OL Reign	1–4	NJ/NY Gotham FC	Seattle, Washington
3:00 pm	Latsko (yellow card) 71'; Huitema 77'; Fishlock (yellow card) 78'	Box; Report	Nighswonger 10'; Williams 12'; T. Smith 38'; Bruninha 73'; Ryan (yellow card) 80'	Stadium: Lumen Field; Attendance: 8,146; Referee: Katja Koroleva

May 27, 2023 9	OL Reign	4–1	Angel City FC	Seattle, Washington
12:30 pm	Bennett 34'; Latsko 52', 55'; Quinn 82'	Box; Report	Weatherholt (yellow card) 22'; Emslie 27'; Le Bihan (yellow card) 61'	Stadium: Lumen Field; Attendance: 7,620; Referee: Thomas Snyder

June 3, 2023 10	OL Reign	0–2	Portland Thorns FC	Seattle, Washington
5:00 pm	Hiatt (yellow card) 21'; Cook (yellow card) 89'	Box; Report	Smith 17'; Sinclair 87'	Stadium: Lumen Field; Attendance: 42,054 (Note: The June 3 match against Portland was part of a doubleheader with Seattle Sounders FC. The attendance figure reflects the tickets counted for the Sounders match.); Referee: Brad Jensen

June 10, 2023 11	OL Reign	2–1	Kansas City Current	Seattle, Washington
7:00 pm	Sonnett (yellow card) 16'; Cook (yellow card) 19'; Huerta 36' (pen.); Huitema 68'	Box; Report	Rodriguez 90+1'; Debinha (yellow card) 90+5'	Stadium: Lumen Field; Attendance: 8,271; Referee: Elijio Arreguin

June 17, 2023 12	Houston Dash	0–0	OL Reign	Houston, Texas
5:30 pm	Jacobs (red card) 45+1'; Laity (yellow card) 45+7'	Box; Report		Stadium: Shell Energy Stadium; Attendance: 8,128; Referee: Danielle Chesky

June 24, 2023 13	San Diego Wave FC	1–2	OL Reign	San Diego, California
7:00 pm	Shaw 47'; Sheridan (red card) 90+1'	Box; Report	Balcer 8', 77'; Barnes (yellow card) 81'; King (yellow card) 83'; Quinn (yellow card) 90+12'	Stadium: Snapdragon Stadium; Attendance: 22,682; Referee: Natalie Simon

July 1, 2023 14	OL Reign	2–2	Racing Louisville FC	Seattle, Washington
12:30 pm	McClernon (yellow card) 4'; Fishlock (yellow card) 23'; Stanton (yellow card) 53'; Latsko 82'; Bennett 87'	Box; Report	Wang 24' (pen.) (yellow card) 41'; Monaghan 76'; Pickett (yellow card) 88'	Stadium: Lumen Field; Attendance: 7,495; Referee: Alex Billeter

July 7, 2023 15	Orlando Pride	1–0	OL Reign	Orlando, Florida
4:00 pm	Bright 16'	Box; Report	Stanton (yellow card) 69'; Bennett (yellow card) 76'	Stadium: Exploria Stadium; Attendance: 6,424; Referee: JC Griggs

August 18, 2023 16	Kansas City Current	1–0	OL Reign	Kansas City, Kansas
5:00 pm	Kizer 61'; Franch (yellow card) 73'; LaBonta (yellow card) 90+11'	Box; Report	McClernon (yellow card) 49'; Quinn (yellow card) 73'	Stadium: Children's Mercy Park; Attendance: 13,455; Referee: Karen Callado

August 27, 2023 17	Angel City FC	2–1	OL Reign	Los Angeles, California
5:00 pm	Le Bihan 13'; Hammond 57'; McCaskill (yellow card) 64'; Johnson (yellow card) 90+6'	Box; Report	Hiatt (yellow card) 56'; Rapinoe 74' (pen.)	Stadium: BMO Stadium; Attendance: 22,000; Referee: Brad Jensen

September 3, 2023 18	OL Reign	1–0	Orlando Pride	Seattle, Washington
3:00 pm	Huitema 49'	Box; Report	Moorhouse (red card) 3'	Stadium: Lumen Field; Attendance: 10,106; Referee: Ricardo Fierro

September 16, 2023 19	Portland Thorns FC	2–0	OL Reign	Portland, Oregon
7:30 pm	Sugita 30'; Weaver 36'; Klingenberg (yellow card) 58'	Box; Report	Sonnett (yellow card) 29'	Stadium: Providence Park; Attendance: 25,218; Referee: Katja Koroleva

October 1, 2023 20	OL Reign	1–1	North Carolina Courage	Seattle, Washington
5:00 pm	Balcer 21'; Cook (red card) 45+7'; Stanton (yellow card) 67'; Huitema (yellow card) 90+2'	Box; Report	Kerolin 43'; Matsukubo (yellow card) 90'	Stadium: Lumen Field; Attendance: 10,345; Referee: Elton Garcia

October 6, 2023 21	OL Reign	0–0	Washington Spirit	Seattle, Washington
5:00 pm	Sonnett (yellow card) 56'; Latsko (yellow card) 84'	Box; Report	Staab (yellow card) 42'; Parsons (yellow card) 44'; Sarr (yellow card) 46'; Sullivan (yellow card) 66'; McKeown (yellow card) 90+7'	Stadium: Lumen Field; Attendance: 34,130; Referee: Thomas Snyder

October 15, 2023 22	Chicago Red Stars	0–3	OL Reign	Bridgeview, Illinois
2:00 pm	Wright (yellow card) 90+4'	Box; Report	Latsko (yellow card) 23'; Rapinoe 47', 50'; Fishlock 59'; Cook (yellow card) 89'; Balcer (yellow card) 90+3'	Stadium: SeatGeek Stadium; Attendance: 8,004; Referee: Anya Voigt

==== Regular-season standings ====
Pos	Team	Pld	W	D	L	GF	GA	GD	Pts	Qualification
1	San Diego Wave FC (S)	22	11	4	7	31	22	+9	37	NWSL Shield, Playoff semifinals, and CONCACAF W Champions Cup
2	Portland Thorns FC	22	10	5	7	42	32	+10	35	Playoff semifinals and W Champions Cup
3	North Carolina Courage	22	9	6	7	29	22	+7	33	Playoff quarterfinals
4	OL Reign	22	9	5	8	29	24	+5	32	Playoff quarterfinals
5	Angel City FC	22	8	7	7	31	30	+1	31	Playoff quarterfinals
6	NJ/NY Gotham FC (C)	22	8	7	7	25	24	+1	31	Playoff quarterfinals
7	Orlando Pride	22	10	1	11	27	28	−1	31	
8	Washington Spirit	22	7	9	6	26	29	−3	30	
9	Racing Louisville FC	22	6	9	7	25	24	+1	27	
10	Houston Dash	22	6	8	8	16	18	−2	26	
11	Kansas City Current	22	8	2	12	30	36	−6	26	
12	Chicago Red Stars	22	7	3	12	28	50	−22	24	

Source: NWSL
Rules for classification: Tiebreakers
(C) Champions and W Champions Cup; (S) NWSL Shield

===== Results summary =====
Overall								Home						Away					
Pld	W	D	L	GF	GA	GD	Pts	W	D	L	GF	GA	GD	W	D	L	GF	GA	GD
22	9	5	8	29	24	+5	32	6	3	2	19	13	+6	3	2	6	10	11	−1

Last updated: October 15, 2023.
Source: NWSLsoccer.com

===== Results by matchday =====
Matchday	1	2	3	4	5	6	7	8	9	10	11	12	13	14	15	16	17	18	19	20	21	22
Stadium	A	A	H	H	A	H	A	H	H	H	H	A	A	H	A	A	A	H	A	H	H	A
Result	L	W	W	W	D	W	L	L	W	L	W	D	W	D	L	L	L	W	L	D	D	W
Position (Note: RGN's position at the end of the day on which their match was played.)	11	5	4	2	2	1	2	5	2	5	4	2	3	3	3	4	6	4	5	6	6	4

Updated to match(es) played on October 15, 2023. Source: NWSLsoccer.com
A = Away; H = Home; W = Win; D = Draw; L = Loss

=== Playoffs ===
October 20, 2023 First round	OL Reign	1–0	Angel City FC	Seattle, Washington
7:00 pm	Latsko 87'; Huerta (yellow card) 90+5'	Box; Report	McCaskill (yellow card) 76'	Stadium: Lumen Field; Attendance: 12,152; Referee: Brad Jensen

November 5, 2023 Semifinals	San Diego Wave FC	0–1	OL Reign	San Diego, California
6:30 pm		Box; Report	Latsko 47'	Stadium: Snapdragon Stadium; Attendance: 32,262; Referee: Natalie Simon

November 11, 2023 Championship	OL Reign	1–2	NJ/NY Gotham FC	San Diego, California
2:00 pm	Lavelle 29'; Sonnett (yellow card) 87'	Box; Report	Williams 24'; Esther 45+2'; Haught (red card) 90+7'; Amorós (yellow card) 90+8'	Stadium: Snapdragon Stadium; Attendance: 25,011

=== Challenge Cup ===
==== Group stage ====
April 19, 2023	Angel City FC	0–2	OL Reign	Los Angeles, California
7:00 pm	Johnson (yellow card) 86'	Box; Report	Stanton (yellow card) 40'; Huitema 64'; Le Bihan 77' (o.g.)	Stadium: BMO Stadium; Attendance: 10,021; Referee: Anya Voigt

May 3, 2023	OL Reign	0–0	Angel City FC	Seattle, Washington
7:00 pm		Box; Report	McCaskill (yellow card) 79'	Stadium: Lumen Field; Attendance: 5,511; Referee: Adam Kilpatrick

May 31, 2023	San Diego Wave FC	0–3	OL Reign	San Diego, California
7:00 pm	Kornieck (yellow card) 19'; Gyau (yellow card) 90+2'; Colaprico (yellow card) 90+4'	Box; Report	Sonnett (yellow card) 16'; Stanton (yellow card) 21'; Holmes (yellow card) 22'; Brown 29'; Athens 54'; Huitema 60'; Malonson (yellow card) 67'	Stadium: Snapdragon Stadium; Attendance: 9,763; Referee: Anya Voigt

June 28, 2023	Portland Thorns FC	0–1	OL Reign	Portland, Oregon
7:30 pm	Nally (yellow card) 54'	Box; Report	Bennett 55'	Stadium: Providence Park; Attendance: 16,252; Referee: Matt Thompson

July 28, 2023	OL Reign	1–0	San Diego Wave FC	Seattle, Washington
7:00 pm	Balcer 71' (pen.)	Box; Report	Hill (yellow card) 56'; Pogarch (yellow card) 90+5'	Stadium: Lumen Field; Attendance: 7,513; Referee: Alyssa Nichols

August 6, 2023	OL Reign	0–0	Portland Thorns FC	Seattle, Washington
5:00 pm		Box; Report		Stadium: Lumen Field; Attendance: 12,061; Referee: Matthew Corrigan

===== Divisional standings =====
Pos	Team	Pld	W	T	L	GF	GA	GD	Pts	Qualification	RGN	LA	POR	SD
1	OL Reign	6	4	2	0	7	0	+7	14	Advance to knockout stage	—	0–0	0–0	1–0
2	Angel City FC	6	2	2	2	7	8	−1	8		0–2	—	2–1	2–1
3	Portland Thorns FC	6	2	1	3	8	7	+1	7		0–1	3–2	—	4–1
4	San Diego Wave FC	6	1	1	4	4	11	−7	4		0–3	1–1	1–0	—

Source: NWSL

==== Knockout stage ====
September 6, 2023 Semifinal	OL Reign	0–1	Racing Louisville FC	Seattle, Washington
7:00 pm		Box; Report	Davis 28'; Holloway (yellow card) 34'; Kgatlana (yellow card) 62'	Stadium: Lumen Field; Attendance: 3,906; Referee: Natalie Simon

== Appearances and goals ==
As of November 11, 2023; only players who have made appearances are listed.

No.	Pos	Nat	Player	Total		Regular season		Playoffs		Challenge Cup	
No.	Pos	Nat	Player	Apps	Goals	Apps	Goals	Apps	Goals	Apps	Goals
Goalkeepers:
18	GK	(United States) USA	Laurel Ivory	4	0	0	0	0	0	4	0
30	GK	(United States) USA	Claudia Dickey	12	0	6	0	3	0	3	0
Defenders:
2	DF	(United States) USA	Emily Sonnett	25	0	19	0	3	0	2+1	0
3	DF	(United States) USA	Lauren Barnes	29	0	22	0	3	0	0+4	0
4	DF	(United States) USA	Alana Cook	23	0	18	0	3	0	2	0
11	DF	(United States) USA	Sofia Huerta	24	1	16+1	1	3	0	2+2	0
17	DF	(United States) USA	Sam Hiatt	22	0	16	0	0	0	4+2	0
20	DF	(United States) USA	Alyssa Malonson	9	0	0+4	0	0	0	2+3	0
21	DF	(United States) USA	Phoebe McClernon	16	0	8+1	0	3	0	3+1	0
22	DF	(United States) USA	Ryanne Brown	17	1	4+7	0	0	0	5+1	1
25	DF	(United States) USA	Shae Holmes	12	0	2+3	0	0	0	7	0
Midfielders:
5	MF	(Canada) CAN	Quinn	20	1	9+6	1	1+2	0	2	0
6	MF	(Brazil) BRA	Angelina	5	0	0+4	0	0	0	1	0
7	MF	(United States) USA	Nikki Stanton	22	0	2+13	0	0+1	0	6	0
10	MF	(Wales) WAL	Jess Fishlock	23	4	16+1	4	3	0	0+3	0
12	MF	(United States) USA	Olivia Athens	12	1	1+5	0	0	0	6	1
13	MF	(United States) USA	Marley Canales	6	0	0+2	0	0	0	3+1	0
16	MF	(United States) USA	Rose Lavelle	7	1	4	0	2+1	1	0	0
33	MF	(United States) USA	Olivia Van der Jagt	24	1	12+5	1	0+2	0	3+2	0
Forwards:
8	FW	(United States) USA	Bethany Balcer	29	7	19+3	6	0+3	0	2+2	1
9	FW	(Canada) CAN	Jordyn Huitema	27	7	14+6	5	3	0	1+3	2
15	FW	(United States) USA	Megan Rapinoe	21	5	12+3	5	3	0	0+3	0
23	FW	(United States) USA	Tziarra King	20	0	9+5	0	0	0	6	0
24	FW	(United States) USA	Veronica Latsko	28	6	10+8	4	3	2	7	0
34	FW	(United States) USA	Elyse Bennett	29	3	7+14	2	0+1	0	5+2	1
Players who left the team during the season:
31	MF	(United States) USA	Natalie Viggiano	3	0	0	0	0	0	0+3	0
51	FW	(United States) USA	McKenzie Weinert	3	0	0+2	0	0	0	1	0
54	FW	(United States) USA	Jadyn Edwards	1	0	0	0	0	0	0+1	0
91	GK	(United States) USA	Phallon Tullis-Joyce	16	0	16	0	0	0	0	0
Own goals for:
	MF	(France) FRA	Clarisse Le Bihan (4/19 @ LA)	1	1	0	0	0	0	1	1

== Transfers ==
For incoming transfers, dates listed are when OL Reign officially signed the players to the roster. Transactions where only the rights to the players are acquired (e.g., draft picks) are not listed. For outgoing transfers, dates listed are when OL Reign officially removed the players from its roster, not when they signed with another team. If a player later signed with another team, her new team will be noted, but the date listed here remains the one when she was officially removed from the OL Reign roster.

=== Transfers in ===
Date	Player	Pos.	Signed From	Notes	Ref.
January 11, 2023	(United States) Elyse Bennett	FW	(United States) Kansas City Current	Acquired, along with the No. 23 pick in the 2023 NWSL Draft, in exchange for $150,000 in allocation money	
January 12, 2023	(United States) Emily Sonnett	DF	(United States) Washington Spirit	Acquired in exchange for the No. 32 pick in the 2023 NWSL Draft and the natural first-round pick in the 2024 NWSL Draft	
February 22, 2023	(Brazil) Luany	MF	(Brazil) Grêmio	Transfer	
March 25, 2023	(United States) Shae Holmes	DF	(United States) Washington Huskies	Draftee	
June 26, 2023	(United States) Jadyn Edwards	FW	(United States) New Mexico Lobos	National Team Replacement player	
June 26, 2023	(United States) Kelly Fitzgerald	MF	(Denmark) HB Køge	National Team Replacement player	
June 26, 2023	(United States) Kelly Ann Livingstone	DF	(Denmark) Fortuna Hjørring	National Team Replacement player	
June 26, 2023	(United States) Natalie Viggiano	MF	(United States) Wisconsin Badgers	National Team Replacement player	
June 26, 2023	(United States) McKenzie Weinert	FW	(United States) Washington Huskies	National Team Replacement player	
September 21, 2023	(United States) Maia Pérez	GK	(France) GPSO 92 Issy	Free	

==== Draft picks ====
Draft picks are not automatically signed to the team roster. Only those who are signed to a contract will be listed as incoming transfers.

Player	Pos.	Previous Team	Notes	Ref.
(United States) Shae Holmes	DF	(United States) Washington Huskies	No. 19 pick	
(United States) Natalie Viggiano	MF	(United States) Wisconsin Badgers	No. 46 pick	

=== Transfers out ===
Date	Player	Pos.	Destination Team	Notes	Ref.
November 15, 2022	(United States) Sinclaire Miramontez	DF		Waived	
November 15, 2022	(United States) Jodi Ulkekul	FW	(United States) Spokane Zephyr	Waived	
November 15, 2022	(United States) Tobin Heath	FW		Free	
August 23, 2023	(United States) Jadyn Edwards	FW	(Hungary) Ferencváros	National Team Replacement period concluded	
August 23, 2023	(United States) Kelly Fitzgerald	MF		National Team Replacement period concluded	
August 23, 2023	(United States) Kelly Ann Livingstone	DF	(United States) Carolina Ascent	National Team Replacement period concluded	
August 23, 2023	(United States) Natalie Viggiano	MF	(Portugal) Damaiense	National Team Replacement period concluded	
August 23, 2023	(United States) McKenzie Weinert	FW	(Australia) Melbourne Victory	National Team Replacement period concluded	
September 14, 2023	(United States) Phallon Tullis-Joyce	GK	(England) Manchester United	Undisclosed	

=== Loans out ===
Start	End	Player	Pos.	Destination Team	Notes	Ref.
March 24, 2023	June 30, 2023	(Mexico) Jimena López	DF	(Iceland) UMF Selfoss		
July 3, 2023	June 21, 2024	(Mexico) Jimena López	DF	(Spain) Valencia		
August 11, 2023	June 30, 2024	(Brazil) Luany	MF	(Spain) Madrid CFF		

=== New contracts ===
Date	Player	Pos.	Notes	Ref.
October 28, 2022	(Canada) Quinn	MF	Re-signed	
November 8, 2022	(United States) Sam Hiatt	DF	Re-signed	
November 15, 2022	(United States) Olivia Athens	MF	Option exercised	
November 15, 2022	(United States) Claudia Dickey	GK	Option exercised	
November 15, 2022	(United States) Laurel Ivory	GK	Option exercised	
November 15, 2022	(United States) Olivia Van der Jagt	MF	Option exercised	
December 1, 2022	(United States) Marley Canales	MF	Re-signed	
January 6, 2023	(United States) Nikki Stanton	MF	Re-signed	
January 10, 2023	(United States) Lauren Barnes	DF	Re-signed	
January 11, 2023	(United States) Megan Rapinoe	FW	Re-signed	
June 2, 2023	(United States) Elyse Bennett	FW	Contract extended	
July 3, 2023	(Mexico) Jimena López	DF	Re-signed	
July 26, 2023	(United States) Veronica Latsko	FW	Option exercised	
July 28, 2023	(United States) Phoebe McClernon	DF	Option exercised	
August 22, 2023	(United States) Olivia Van der Jagt	MF	Contract extended	
September 12, 2023	(Wales) Jess Fishlock	MF	Option exercised	
September 15, 2023	(Canada) Jordyn Huitema	FW	Option exercised	

== Awards ==
=== Challenge Cup All-Tournament Team ===
- Shae Holmes

=== Best XI of the Month ===
Month	Player	Ref.
March/April	(United States) Phallon Tullis-Joyce (Wales) Jess Fishlock (United States) Bethany Balcer	
May	(United States) Veronica Latsko (United States) Megan Rapinoe	
June	(United States) Sofia Huerta	

=== Player of the Week ===
Week	Player	Ref.
3	(United States) Phallon Tullis-Joyce	

=== Save of the Week ===
Week	Player	Ref.
11	(United States) Phallon Tullis-Joyce	
12	(United States) Phallon Tullis-Joyce (2)	
13	(United States) Phallon Tullis-Joyce (3)	
	(United States) Claudia Dickey	
