= Jodi Ülkekul =

American soccer player (born 1997)

Personal information
- Full name: Jodi Sevim Ülkekul
- Date of birth: July 23, 1997 (age 29)
- Place of birth: Sammamish, Washington, U.S.
- Height: 5 ft 3 in (1.60 m)
- Position: Forward

Youth career
- 2006–2015: Crossfire Premier

College career
Years	Team	Apps	(Gls)
2015–2018	Gonzaga Bulldogs	74	(7)

Senior career*
Years	Team	Apps	(Gls)
- Seattle Sounders
2019–2021	Roma CF		
2021–2022	CD Castellón		
2022	OL Reign	0	(0)
2024–2025	Spokane Zephyr	15	(0)
2025–2026	Sydney FC	18	(0)
2026	Salmon Bay FC	0	(0)
- * Club domestic league appearances and goals

Jodi Sevim Ülkekul (born July 23, 1997) is an American former professional soccer player who played as a forward. She played college soccer for the Gonzaga Bulldogs, before spells at Women's Premier Soccer League (WPSL) club Seattle Sounders, Serie B Femminile club Roma CF, Tercera Federación club CD Castellón, National Women's Soccer League (NWSL) club OL Reign, USL Super League club Spokane Zephyr and A-League Women club Sydney FC.

== Early life ==
The youngest of three sisters, Ülkekul was born and raised in a soccer-geared family in Sammamish, Washington. She joined youth soccer team Crossfire Premier in 2006 and helped the club's A team reach the quarterfinals of the Washington state championship in 2012. Ülkekul attended Eastlake High School and made it onto the school's varsity soccer team as a freshman. She went on to be a two-time team MVP and was an all-conference first team honoree as a senior.

== College career ==
Ülkekul was originally not offered a soccer scholarship by Gonzaga University, so she joined the school's team as a walk-on in 2015. She went on to play in all 74 of the Bulldogs' matches over the next four years. In her junior and senior seasons, she co-captained the team, assuming a passionate leadership role not dissimilar to the one she had filled in high school. Although she would go on to play as a forward professionally, Ülkekul primarily played as a defender in her four years at Gonzaga. She still managed to record 7 goals and 8 assists from the backline, including a pair of goals against San Diego in September 2019 that would prove to be the only multi-goal game of her college career.

== Club career ==
Ülkekul has played for the Seattle Sounders Women in the amateur Women's Premier Soccer League.

Ülkekul started her professional career overseas with Italian second-division club Roma CF, where she played from 2019 to 2021.

On 15 July 2021, Ülkekul was announced to have joined Spanish Reto Iberdrola side CD Castellón on a one-year deal. Castellón went on to have an unsuccessful season, finishing last in the league and getting relegated to the Spanish third tier.

On July 1, 2022, National Women's Soccer League (NWSL) team OL Reign announced that they had signed Ülkekul to a short-term national team replacement player contract. On August 17, the Reign extended Ülkekul through the end of the 2022 NWSL season. She played in one game for the Reign, a non-competitive appearance in The Women's Cup, before sustaining a season-ending ACL rupture in September 2022. The Reign waived Ülkekul at the end of the season.

Ülkekul's ACL rehab journey was fraught with post-operation complications. During her recovery, she came into contact with USL Spokane head of performance Josh McAllister, who was searching for potential players for the Spokane Zephyr FC squad ahead of the inaugural USL Super League season. After a year and a half, Ülkekul decided to join the Zephyr. She was officially announced to have signed for the club on June 4, 2024; the move reunited her with former Gonzaga teammate Sophia Braun. On September 8, she made her first competitive appearance in over two years, coming on as a substitute for Taryn Ries in the Zephyr's second-ever match. She played in 15 matches for the Zephyr before departing from Spokane at the end of the season.

In August 2025, Ülkekul was announced to have signed for Australian club Sydney FC. She made her A-League debut on October 31, 2025, participating in Sydney's season-opening draw with Melbourne City FC. On April 2, 2026, Ülkekul announced her retirement from professional soccer. She played her final career match two days later, starting in Sydney FC's 0–0 draw with the Central Coast Mariners to end the season.

Following her retirement, Ülkekul spent a short stint with pre-professional USL W League team Salmon Bay FC in the summer of 2026. Despite not making a regular season appearance for the club, she later participated in Salmon Bay's national championship title match, coming on as an extra-time substitute in an eventual penalty shootout win over Vermont Green FC.

== Personal life ==
Ülkekul is of Turkish descent.

Following her retirement from playing professionally, Ülkekul moved back to her home state of Washington, taking a job as a youth soccer coach for local club Eastside FC.
