= Makena Carr =

American soccer player (born 2000)

Personal information
- Date of birth: May 19, 2000 (age 26)
- Height: 5 ft 5 in (1.65 m)
- Position: Full-back

Youth career
- Eastside FC

College career
Years	Team	Apps	(Gls)
2018–2022	Washington Huskies	39	(2)
2023	Saint Mary’s Gaels	15	(1)

Senior career*
Years	Team	Apps	(Gls)
2024	Spokane Zephyr	1	(0)
- * Club domestic league appearances and goals as of February 13, 2025

Makena Carr (born May 19, 2000) is an American former professional soccer player who played as a full-back. She played college soccer for the Washington Huskies and the Saint Mary’s Gaels before spending a short professional stint with USL Super League club Spokane Zephyr FC.

== Early life ==
Carr grew up alongside three siblings in Newcastle, Washington. She attended Liberty High School, where she scored 32 goals and notched 12 assists to help the team win a state championship in 2017. Carr also won a state championship with her youth club team, Eastside FC, in the same year. Carr's efforts in 2017 were awarded as she was named the Star Times girls soccer player of the year and the state MVP.

== College career ==
=== Washington Huskies ===
In 2018, Carr kicked off her college career with the Washington Huskies. In her first year in Washington, Carr operated as a forward and recorded her first collegiate assist in a win against Oregon on September 30. She tallied her first goal with the Huskies in the team's first victory of 2019, scoring the opening goal in a 2–0 win over New Mexico. After playing in 37 games in her first two years of college, Carr found her career impeded by back-to-back knee injuries that sidelined her for nearly three years. During her time in convalescence, Carr was named to the Pac-12 Academic Honor Roll. She made her return to the field in the fall of 2022, playing in 2 matches to close out her time with the Huskies.

=== Saint Mary's Gaels ===
For her final year of college, Carr transferred to Saint Mary's College of California, where she played for the Gaels in 2023. She started in all 18 of the team's games, recording 1 goal and 2 assists over 1,543 minutes. Carr was named to the All-WCC First Team following her performances.

== Club career ==
Carr was drafted by Seattle Reign FC as the 43rd overall pick of the 2024 NWSL Draft. She became the second-ever Saint Mary's Gaels women's soccer player to be drafted into a professional league and the first in twenty-one years. Carr trained with the Reign in preseason and starred as a substitute in a friendly against her former college team, the Washington Huskies. Ultimately, she did not sign with the Reign and was not included in the team's final roster for the season.

On May 16, 2024, Carr signed her first professional contract with USL Super League team Spokane Zephyr FC. She started in the club's inaugural match, a 1–1 draw with Fort Lauderdale United FC. In February 2025, Carr and Spokane mutually agreed to terminate her contract with the club. Carr later chose to step away from soccer entirely to pursue a career as an airplane pilot.

== Career statistics ==
=== Club ===
As of June 17, 2025

Appearances and goals by club, season and competition
Club	Season	League			Cup		Playoffs		Total	
Club	Season	Division	Apps	Goals	Apps	Goals	Apps	Goals	Apps	Goals
Spokane Zephyr FC	2024–25	USL Super League	1	0	—		—		1	0
Career total			1	0	0	0	0	0	1	0
