= Jenny Vetter =

American soccer player (born 1999)

Personal information
- Full name: Jennifer Lauren Vetter
- Date of birth: October 17, 1999 (age 27)
- Place of birth: Minnesota, United States
- Height: 5 ft 4 in (1.63 m)
- Positions: Striker; midfielder

Team information
- Current team: Åland United
- Number: 10

Youth career
- Mankato United

College career
Years	Team	Apps	(Gls)
2018–2022	Minnesota State Mavericks	93	(57)

Senior career*
Years	Team	Apps	(Gls)
2023–2024	Racing Power	19	(9)
2024–2025	Spokane Zephyr	12	(0)
2026–	Åland United	0	(0)
- * Club domestic league appearances and goals as of 04:11, February 5, 2026 (UTC)

Jennifer Lauren Vetter (born October 17, 1999) is an American professional soccer player who plays as a striker or midfielder for Kansallinen Liiga club Åland United. She played college soccer for the Minnesota State Mavericks before starting her professional career with Portuguese club Racing Power FC and USL Super League club Spokane Zephyr FC.

== Early life ==
Vetter was born in Minnesota to parents Tim and Ruth Vetter. She grew up on a farm nearby Kasota alongside her older sister, Lizzy. A multi-sport athlete, she started playing soccer in kindergarten, basketball in 4th grade, and track and field in middle school. Vetter participated in all three sports at Mankato East High School, accumulating a total of nine varsity letters across four years. She was a two-time all-conference and one-time all-state recognee for track, where she participated in multiple events. With the soccer team, Vetter was a four-year starter and two-year captain. A three-time all-conference and all-city honoree, she set program records in both goals and assists. As a junior, she also earned an honorable mention on the all-state team. Outside of school, she played club soccer for Mankato United.

== College career ==
In her sophomore year of high school, Vetter committed to Minnesota State University, Mankato, her local university. She was used mainly as a substitute in her freshman season of college with the Mavericks, playing in all 23 matches and making 8 starts. On September 14, 2018, she recorded her first collegiate goal contribution, an assist in a victory over Winona State. She scored her first college goal on October 9, helping MSU reach a 3–1 win over Concordia St. Paul. Vetter also ran track as a freshman, following in the footsteps of her mother, Ruth. She participated in two events: the long jump and the 60-meter dash. She later chose to step away from track in order to place her focus entirely on soccer.

Vetter had a breakout year as a sophomore, breaking program records for single-season shots and game-winning goals. She became one of only 2 players to score 20 goals in one season in MSU women's soccer history. 8 of her goals came in an 8-match scoring streak that started in October 2019 and ended in November. She was also named the 2019 NSIC Tournament MVP.

In her remaining three seasons of college, Vetter built upon her initial success. She started every single match for the Mavericks and was the team top scorer in each year. Upon departure from the program, she ranked third in team history for overall goals and first in game-winners. Vetter was a three-time CoSIDA first-team All-American, a one-time United Soccer Coaches first-team All-American (and two-time third team), and a two-time NSIC Offensive Player of the Year. She also found academic success, maintaining a 4.0 GPA for much of college and becoming the only athlete in Minnesota State school history to earn four Academic All-American honors.

== Club career ==
=== Racing Power ===
Vetter registered for the 2023 NWSL Draft, but she was not selected by any team. Instead, she spent time after leaving college training with NWSL club Houston Dash. On June 21, 2023, she signed a one-year contract, not with the Dash, but with Portuguese club Racing Power FC. Joining Racing Power was not only significant due to it being Vetter's first professional contract, but it was also her first time leaving the United States. In her first season with the club, she made 29 appearances and scored in 14 goals across all competitions as Racing Power finished 3rd in the Campeonato Nacional Feminino. The squad also made it to the Taça de Portugal final, where they were defeated by Benfica. Vetter was a prominent piece in the historic run, with one of her contributions being a semifinal goal to help the team beat SC Braga.

=== Spokane Zephyr ===
On June 7, 2024, Vetter was announced to have signed with Spokane Zephyr FC ahead of the inaugural USL Super League season. She made her club debut on September 8, coming on as a second-half substitute for Emina Ekic in the Zephyr's second-ever match. She played in 12 matches as Spokane finished 5th in the table, just below the playoff line.

=== Åland United ===
In February 2026, Vetter joined Finnish club Åland United on a one-year contract.

== Career statistics ==
=== Club ===
As of June 10, 2025

Appearances and goals by club, season and competition
Club	Season	League			Cup (Note: Includes the Taça da Liga and Taça de Portugal)		Playoffs (Note: Includes USL Super League playoffs)		Total	
Club	Season	Division	Apps	Goals	Apps	Goals	Apps	Goals	Apps	Goals
Racing Power FC	2023–24	Campeonato Nacional Feminino	19	9	10	5	—		29	14
Spokane Zephyr FC	2024–25	USL Super League	12	0	—		—		12	0
Career total			31	9	10	5	0	0	41	14
