= Mollie Rouse =

English footballer

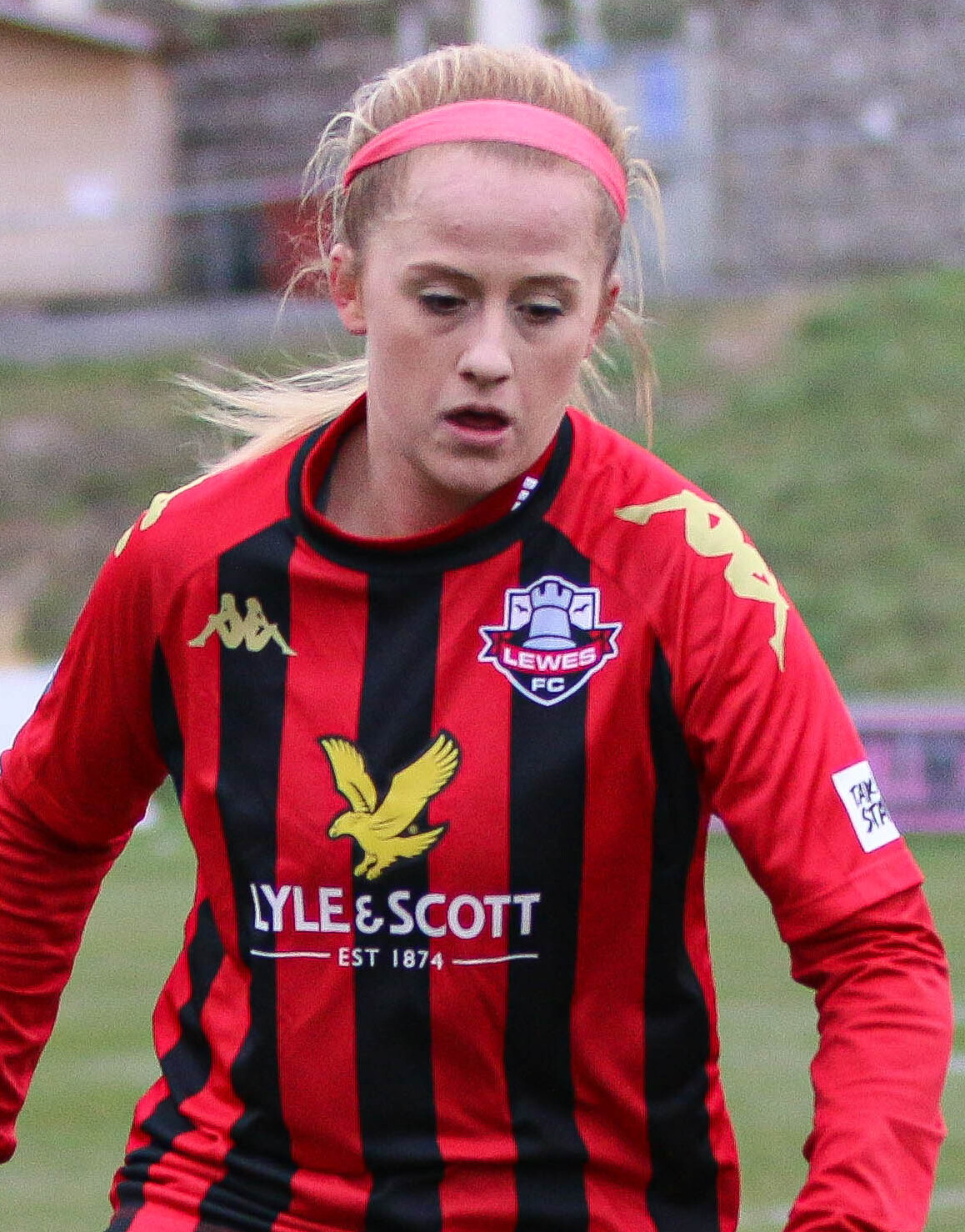
- Rouse with Lewes in 2021

Personal information
- Full name: Mollie Ann Rouse
- Date of birth: 27 November 1998 (age 27)
- Place of birth: Warwick, England
- Height: 1.60 m (5 ft 3 in)
- Position: Midfielder

Team information
- Current team: Sheffield United
- Number: 25

Youth career
- 2015–2016: Aston Villa

College career
Years	Team	Apps	(Gls)
2017–2018	Louisville Cardinals	20	(4)
2019	UCF Knights	19	(1)

Senior career*
Years	Team	Apps	(Gls)
2015–2016	Aston Villa	0	(0)
2021	Lewes	8	(0)
2021–2022	London City Lionesses	18	(3)
2022–2023	Turbine Potsdam	23	(0)
2023–2024	Sunderland	13	(0)
2024–2025	Spokane Zephyr	13	(1)
2025–	Sheffield United	13	(1)

International career
2013–2015	England U17	6	(1)
2017	England U19	7	(4)
2017–2018	England U20	7	(0)
2019	England U21	4	(0)
- * Club domestic league appearances and goals as of 1 February 2026

Mollie Ann Rouse (born 27 November 1998) is an English footballer who plays in midfield for Sheffield United W.F.C..

== International career ==
Rouse has represented England at U20 level.

== Club career ==
=== Spokane Zephyr FC ===
In June 2024, Rouse signed with American team, Spokane Zephyr FC, for the inaugural season of the USL Super League.

=== Sheffield United ===
In September 2025, Rouse left Spokane to return to England, signing with Sheffield United.

== Career statistics ==
=== Club ===
As of 1 February 2026

Club	Season	League			Cup (Note: Includes Women's FA Cup and FA Women's League Cup)		Total	
Club	Season	Division	Apps	Goals	Apps	Goals	Apps	Goals
Aston Villa	2015	FA WSL 2	—		2	0	2	0
Aston Villa	2016	FA WSL 2	—		1	0	1	0
Aston Villa	Total		—		3	0	3	0
Lewes	2020–21	Women's Championship	8	0	—		8	0
London City Lionesses	2021–22	Women's Championship	18	3	4	0	22	3
Turbine Potsdam	2022–23	Frauen-Bundesliga	20	0	1	0	21	0
Turbine Potsdam	2023–24	2. Frauen-Bundesliga	3	0	—		3	0
Turbine Potsdam	Total		23	0	1	0	24	0
Sunderland	2023–24	Women's Championship	13	0	6	1	19	1
Spokane Zephyr FC	2024–25	USL Super League	11	1	—		11	1
Spokane Zephyr FC	2025–26	USL Super League	2	0	—		2	0
Spokane Zephyr FC	Total		13	1	—		13	1
Sheffield United	2025–26	WSL 2	13	1	4	0	17	1
Career total			88	5	18	1	106	6
