= Sarah McCoy (soccer) =

American soccer player (born 1999)

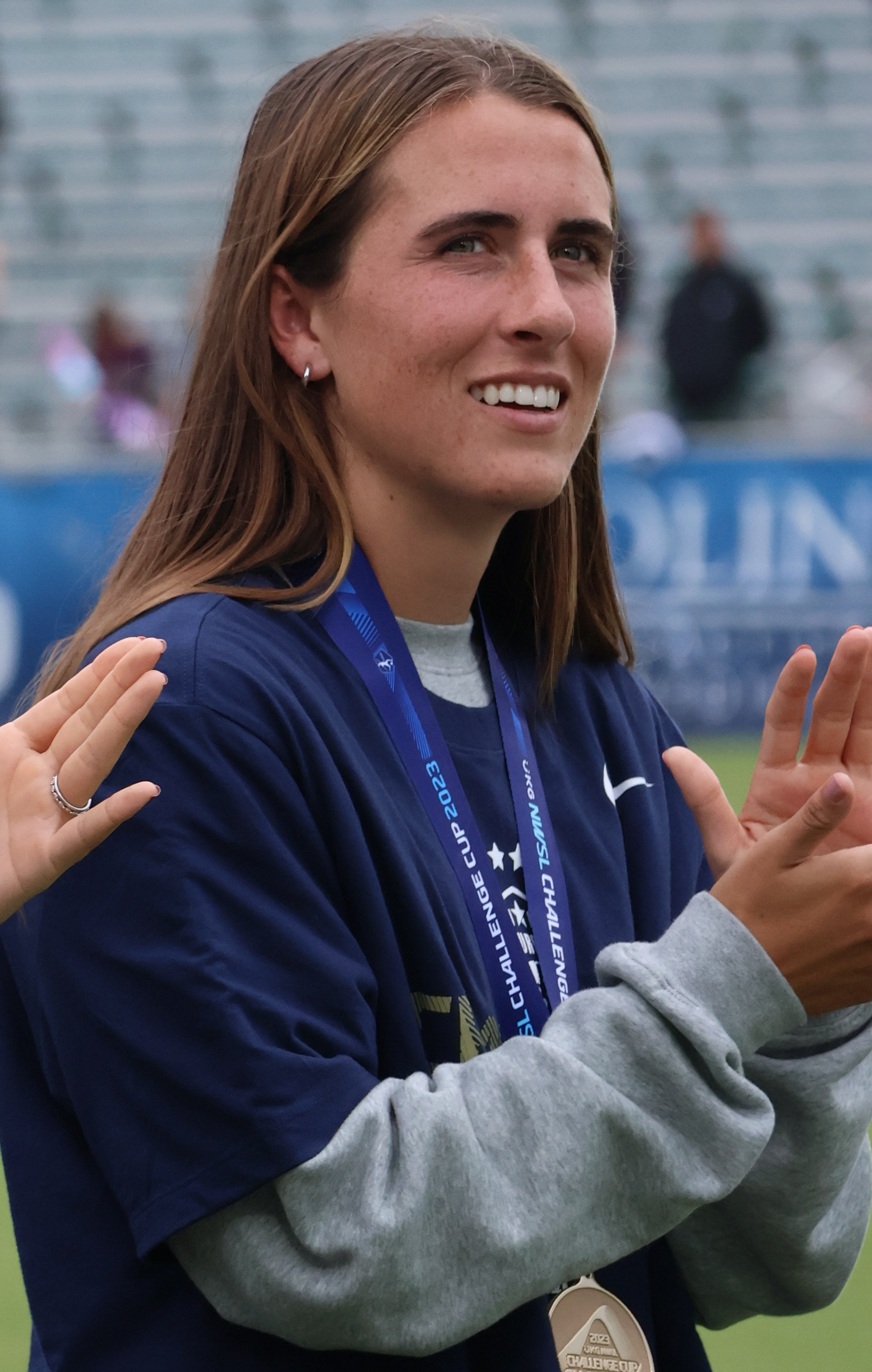
- McCoy with the North Carolina Courage in 2023

Personal information
- Birth name: Sarah Grace Clark
- Date of birth: March 26, 1999 (age 27)
- Place of birth: Durham, North Carolina
- Height: 5 ft 6 in (1.68 m)
- Position: Center back

Team information
- Current team: DC Power FC
- Number: 4

Youth career
- Michigan Hawks

College career
Years	Team	Apps	(Gls)
2017–2019	Purdue Boilermakers	36	(3)
2020–2022	Virginia Cavaliers	61	(0)

Senior career*
Years	Team	Apps	(Gls)
2023	North Carolina Courage	0	(0)
2023–2024	Canberra United	16	(1)
2024–2026	Spokane Zephyr	52	(0)
2026–	DC Power FC	0	(0)
- * Club domestic league appearances and goals as of 22:57, May 18, 2026 (UTC)

Sarah McCoy (née Clark; born March 26, 1999) is an American professional soccer player who plays as a center back for USL Super League club DC Power FC. She played college soccer for the Purdue Boilermakers and Virginia Cavaliers. She previously played for the North Carolina Courage, Canberra United, and Spokane Zephyr (which she captained).

== Early life ==
Born in Durham, North Carolina, McCoy grew up in Brighton, Michigan. She played club soccer for the Michigan Hawks, winning two ECNL national championships and five conference titles. She graduated from Mercy High School in Farmington Hills, Michigan.

== College career ==
Though recruited as a right back, McCoy shifted to center back in her freshman season with the Purdue Boilermakers in 2017, starting 18 games and earning Big Ten Conference all-freshman honors. Head coach Drew Roff moved McCoy to central defensive midfielder in her sophomore season in 2018. She started all 18 games, led the team with 6 assists as the primary corner kick taker, and scored 3 penalties. She was named team captain for her junior season but was forced to redshirt the season due to injury.

McCoy then transferred to the Virginia Cavaliers in 2020. Virginia reached the NCAA tournament semifinals in her debut season, then won the Atlantic Coast Conference regular-season title in 2021. She made 61 appearances, primarily as a substitute, in three seasons with the Cavaliers.

== Club career ==
=== North Carolina Courage ===
After going undrafted in the 2023 NWSL Draft, McCoy joined the North Carolina Courage as a preseason trialist in February 2023. In June, she signed her first professional contract with the Courage as a national team replacement player during the 2023 FIFA Women's World Cup. She made her professional debut in a NWSL Challenge Cup game against the Orlando Pride on July 29, replacing Brianna Pinto in the 79th minute and assisting former college teammate Haley Hopkins's second goal in a 5–0 victory. She made one additional appearance in the competition as the Courage successfully defended their Challenge Cup title. After being released in August, she re-signed with the Courage in September as an injury replacement player for Riley Jackson, staying the rest of the season.

=== Canberra United ===
In December 2023, McCoy moved to Australia to sign with A-League Women club Canberra United. She debuted for the club at halftime in a 2–0 loss to the Melbourne Victory on December 16. On January 6, 2024, she scored her first professional goal with a long-range equalizer in a 3–3 draw against the Newcastle Jets. She played in 16 games, starting 15, during the 2023–24 season.

=== Spokane Zephyr ===
In May 2024, McCoy returned to the United States and joined the Spokane Zephyr before the USL Super League's inaugural season. On August 27, she started in the Zephyr's inaugural game as they drew 1–1 with Fort Lauderdale United. On September 22, she recorded her first professional assist in Zephyr's first-ever win, sending in a free kick for Haley Thomas's diving header for the lone goal against DC Power FC. After having just two wins at the winter break, Spokane found their groove in the spring, with McCoy being named in the Team of the Month in February and May 2025, as the club narrowly missed a playoff spot on tiebreakers. She was named in the All-League Second Team at the end of the season, having played every minute of the campaign and led the league in passes.

McCoy was named the Zephyr's captain before their second season. On February 11, 2026, she left the game with a first-half injury against Sporting JAX, coming off the field for the first time with the Zephyr. Two months later, she again subbed out injured in the first half against Fort Lauderdale United. She missed the last three games of the season as the Zephyr again narrowly missed a playoff berth on the final day of the season. The club folded after their second season.

=== DC Power FC ===
On July 7, 2026, it was announced that McCoy had joined fellow USL Super League club DC Power FC alongside former Zephyr teammate Emma Jaskaniec.

== Personal life ==
McCoy is the daughter of Bill and Lori Clark and has three older siblings. Both her parents went to Purdue. Her brother, Will, played college soccer at UNC Wilmington, and her uncle Mike Clark played professionally for the Columbus Crew.

== Career statistics ==
As of March 22, 2026

Appearances and goals by club, season and competition
Club	Season	League			Cup (Note: Includes the NWSL Challenge Cup)		Playoffs (Note: Includes NWSL Playoffs, A-League Women Finals series)		Total	
Club	Season	Division	Apps	Goals	Apps	Goals	Apps	Goals	Apps	Goals
North Carolina Courage	2023	NWSL	0	0	2	0	0	0	2	0
Canberra United FC	2023–24	A-League	16	1	—		—		16	1
Spokane Zephyr FC	2024–25	USL Super League	28	0	—		—		28	0
Spokane Zephyr FC	2025–26	USL Super League	20	0	—		—		20	0
Spokane Zephyr FC	Total		48	0	0	0	0	0	48	0
Career total			64	1	2	0	0	0	66	1

== Honors ==
Virginia Cavaliers

- Atlantic Coast Conference: 2021

North Carolina Courage

- NWSL Challenge Cup: 2023

Individual

- Second-team USL Super League All-League: 2024–25
- Big Ten Conference all-freshman team: 2017
