= Shae Holmes =

American soccer player (born 2000)

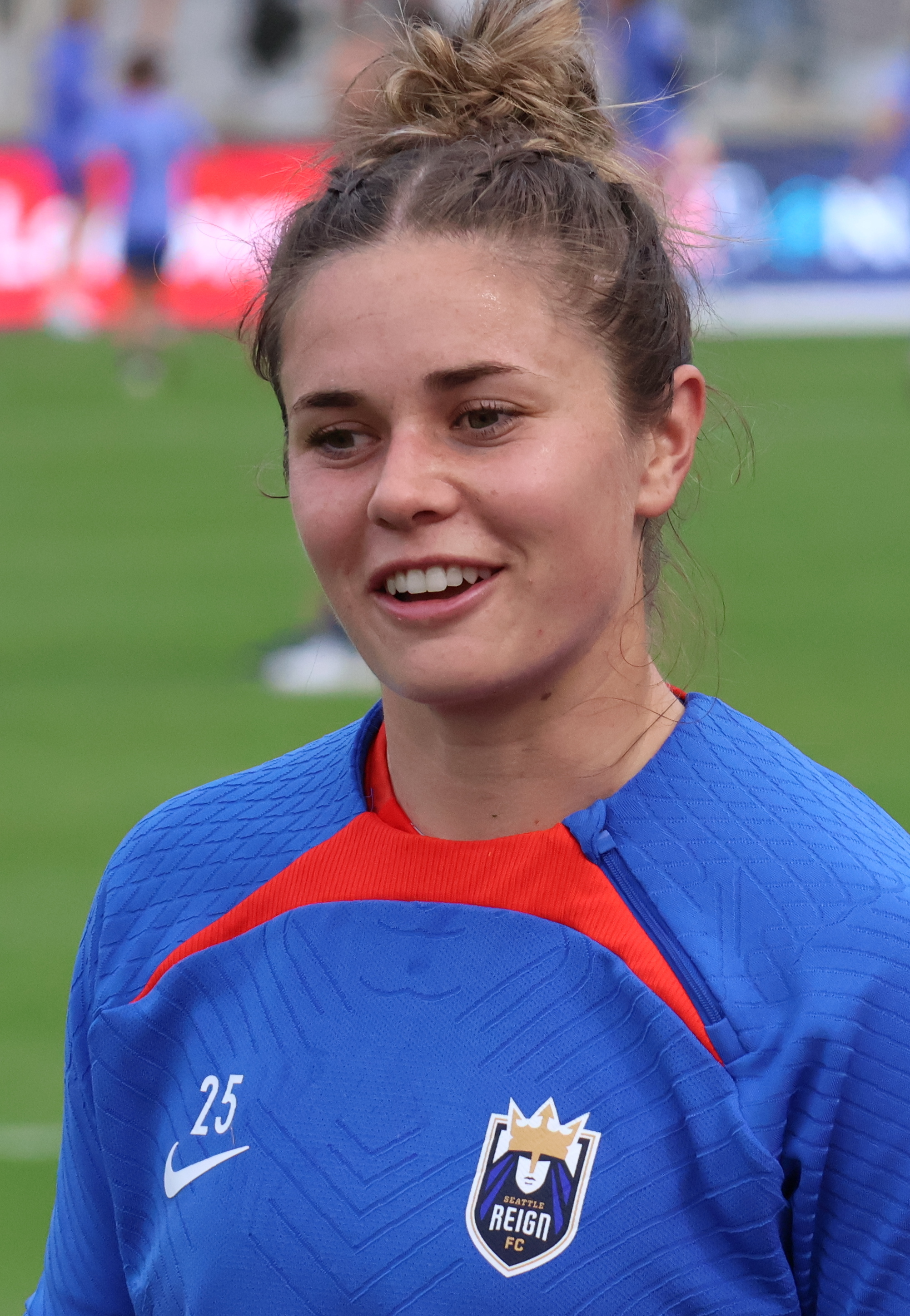
- Holmes with the Seattle Reign in 2024

Personal information
- Date of birth: March 8, 2000 (age 26)
- Place of birth: Highlands Ranch, Colorado, U.S.
- Height: 5 ft 8 in (1.73 m)
- Position: Defender

Team information
- Current team: Seattle Reign
- Number: 25

Youth career
- Real Colorado

College career
Years	Team	Apps	(Gls)
2018–2022	Washington Huskies	44	(2)

Senior career*
Years	Team	Apps	(Gls)
2023–	Seattle Reign	41	(1)

International career
2017	United States U19		
2019–2020	United States U20		
- * Club domestic league appearances and goals as of 16:33, November 8, 2026 (UTC)

Shae Holmes (born March 8, 2000) is an American professional soccer player who plays as a defender for Seattle Reign FC of the National Women's Soccer League (NWSL).

== Early life ==
Holmes played youth soccer for Real Colorado as a striker and was named the Colorado Gatorade Player of the Year in 2017.

== Collegiate career ==
An environmental studies major with a minor in global health, Holmes played for the Washington Huskies from 2018 to 2022. In her final season at the University of Washington, Holmes started all 19 games and earned second-team PAC-12 honors.

== Club career ==
OL Reign selected Holmes in the 2023 NWSL Draft and signed her to the roster. Head coach Laura Harvey had targeted Holmes after previously coaching her at youth national team camps.

Holmes made her NWSL debut in the 2023 NWSL Challenge Cup; she started each of the seven matches the Reign participated in during the tournament.

== International career ==
Holmes is a former United States youth international. She was a defender on the U-16 Girls' National Team.

== Career statistics ==
As of match played November 2nd, 2024

Appearances and goals by club, season and competition
Club	Season	League			Cup (Note: Includes the NWSL Challenge Cup and the 2024 NWSL x Liga MX Femenil Summer Cup)		Playoffs (Note: Includes NWSL Playoffs)		Total	
Club	Season	Division	Apps	Goals	Apps	Goals	Apps	Goals	Apps	Goals
OL Reign	2023	NWSL	5	0	7	0	—		12	0
Seattle Reign	2024	NWSL	19	0	2	0	—		21	0
Career total			24	0	9	0	0	0	33	0
