= Taryn Ries =

American soccer player (born 1999)

Personal information
- Full name: Taryn Morgan Ries
- Date of birth: March 18, 1999 (age 27)
- Place of birth: Vancouver, Washington, U.S.
- Height: 5 ft 8 in (1.73 m)
- Position: Forward

Youth career
- FC Portland

College career
Years	Team	Apps	(Gls)
2017–2021	Portland Pilots	82	(34)

Senior career*
Years	Team	Apps	(Gls)
2022–2023	IK Uppsala	38	(7)
2024	MSV Duisburg	11	(3)
2024–2025	Spokane Zephyr	7	(1)

International career^{‡}
2014	United States U15		
2015	United States U17		
- * Club domestic league appearances and goals as of June 30, 2025 ‡ National team caps and goals as of March 5, 2025

Taryn Morgan Ries (born March 18, 1999) is an American professional soccer player who plays as a forward. Ries played college soccer for the Portland Pilots, where she was a three-time first-team All-WCC. She started her career in Europe, playing with Swedish club IK Uppsala and German club MSV Duisburg.

== Early life ==
Ries was born in Vancouver, Washington, and grew up in the nearby town of Ridgefield. She played soccer Ridgefield High School and helped the team make history by reaching the state playoffs four years in a row. Operating as a midfielder and forward, Ries was an offensive standout and named to the all-state and all-region teams in each of her years of play. She recorded 96 goals and 78 assists across her high school career, 6 of which Ries scored in a single game as a junior. She was a two-time Washington State 2A Player of the Year and helped the Ridgefield Spudders to a historic second-place state finish in 2015. Ries also played club soccer for ECNL club FC Portland in the neighboring state of Oregon. She was a member of the Oregon ODP team from 2012 to 2014.

== College career ==
In her final year of high school, Ries tore her ACL. However, she was able to recover in time to participate in her first year of college soccer with the Portland Pilots, albeit with a degree of caution. She netted her first collegiate goal on October 14, 2017, opening the scoring a 2–1 win against LMU. She ended up appearing 19 times as a freshman, starting 12 games. Ries had a breakout sophomore season, ranking seventh nationally in goals scored and game-winners. Only three hat-tricks were scored in the WCC all season, with Ries tallying two of the triad. She became the first Pilot to score two hat-tricks in one season since Danielle Foxhoven in 2009. She was also named to the 2018 All-West Region Second Team and the All-WCC First Team at the end of the season.

As a junior, Ries shifted from a central position to that of an outside forward. She again found success and was named to the All-WCC First Team once again after leading the Pilots with 8 goals. Ries was tied for fourth in the WCC in game-winners and was named to the All-West Region Second Team. The following year, she kicked off her senior season of soccer with a bang, registering a hat-trick in a comeback 4–3 victory over Oregon State. Ries was again named to the All-WCC First Team at the end of the season, marking her third consecutive year with the award. She completed her college career having scored 34 goals in 82 games.

== Club career ==
=== IK Uppsala ===
Ries signed her first professional contract in January 2022, inking a deal with Swedish second-tier side IK Uppsala. She scored her first Elitettan goal on May 21, 2022, contributing to an 8–1 thrashing of Sundsvalls DFF. After playing 12 league matches and scoring two goals, Ries sustained a foot injury in mid-June and was forced to sit out for the rest of the season.

During her time in convalescence, Ries looked on as Uppsala were promoted to the Damallsvenskan in lieu of Eskilstuna United, who were unable to satisfy economic standards required to make the jump to the Swedish top flight. Ries ended up extending her contract for another season with Uppsala on February 2, 2023. She returned to play after eight months and immediately made an impact, scoring two goals and playing ninety minutes in a cup match on February 26. Ries went on to play a career-high 26 league matches with Uppsala, scoring five goals in the process. At the end of the season, Uppsala were relegated back to the Elitettan after finishing second-to-last in the league.

=== MSV Duisburg ===
On January 10, 2024, Ries joined German club MSV Duisburg on a contract lasting through the end of the 2023–24 season. At the time of her signing, Duisburg sat at the bottom of the Frauen-Bundesliga and had only scored six goals in the first half of the campaign. Ries quickly added to the total, scoring her first goal with Duisburg on February 11 in a 1–1 draw with SC Freiburg. In her short spell with the club, she made a total of 11 appearances and scored three times. However, just as she had experienced with Uppsala, Duisburg were relegated at the end of the season. It was later announced that instead of competing in the 2. Frauen-Bundesliga, Duisburg would play a tier lower in the Regionalliga due to financial concerns. Ries did not re-sign with the team at the end of the season.

=== Spokane Zephyr ===
Ries joined Spokane Zephyr FC of the USL Super League on June 20, 2024, ahead of the league's inaugural season. In doing so, she returned to her home state and reunited with Duisburg teammate Haley Thomas. Ries started Spokane's first-ever franchise match, a 1–1 home draw with Fort Lauderdale United FC. The very next game, she scored her first goal and Spokane's second in history during another 1–1 draw, this time with Brooklyn FC.

== International career ==
Ries was called into camps with United States youth teams as a high schooler. She received her first call-up in April 2014, being summoned to an under-15 camp by head coach B. J. Snow. Ries was also called up to an under-17 camp the following year.

== Career statistics ==
=== Club ===
As of March 5, 2025

Appearances and goals by club, season and competition
Club	Season	League			Cup (Note: Includes the Women's Play-offs 1/2, Svenska Cupen, and DFB-Pokal)		Playoffs		Total	
Club	Season	Division	Apps	Goals	Apps	Goals	Apps	Goals	Apps	Goals
IK Uppsala	2022	Elitettan	12	2	0	0	—		12	2
IK Uppsala	2023	Damallsvenskan	26	5	3	2	—		29	7
IK Uppsala	Total		38	7	3	2	—		41	9
MSV Duisburg	2023–24	Frauen-Bundesliga	11	3	1	0	—		12	3
Spokane Zephyr FC	2024–25	USL Super League	7	1	—		—		7	1
Career total			56	11	4	2	0	0	60	13
