= Reese Tappan =

American soccer player (born 2002)

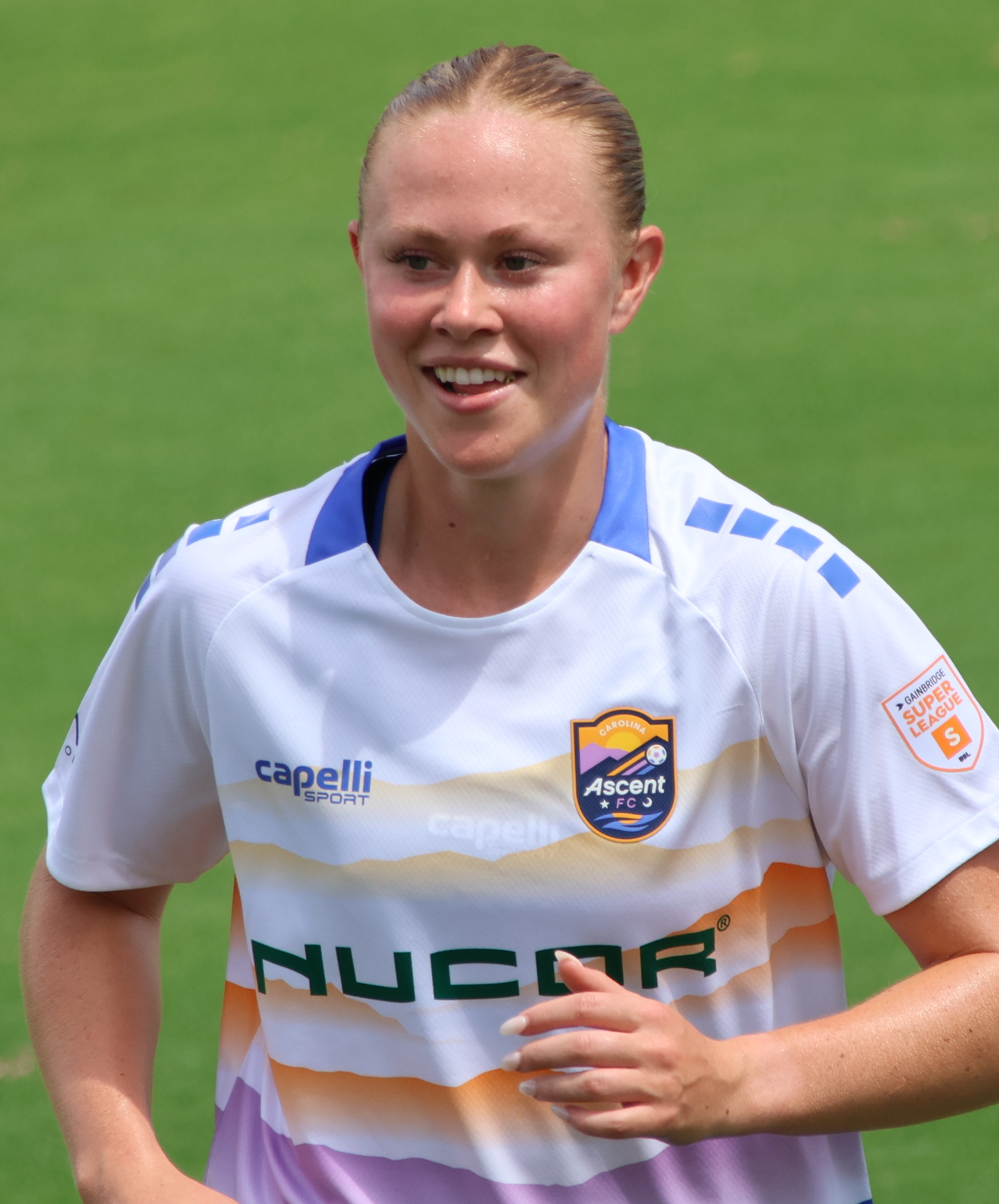
- Tappan with the Carolina Ascent in 2026

Personal information
- Full name: Reese Elizabeth Tappan
- Date of birth: November 25, 2002 (age 23)
- Height: 5 ft 9 in (1.75 m)
- Positions: Center back; right back

Team information
- Current team: Carolina Ascent
- Number: 2

Youth career
- Pacific Northwest SC

College career
Years	Team	Apps	(Gls)
2021–2024	Washington State Cougars	78	(2)

Senior career*
Years	Team	Apps	(Gls)
2025–2026	Spokane Zephyr	34	(1)
2026–	Carolina Ascent	1	(0)
- * Club domestic league appearances and goals as of 05:44, August 16, 2026 (UTC)

Reese Elizabeth Tappan (born November 25, 2002) is an American professional soccer player who plays as a center back for USL Super League club Carolina Ascent. She played college soccer for the Washington State Cougars. She previously played in the USL Super League for the Spokane Zephyr.

== Early life ==
Tappan grew up in Newcastle, Washington, as one of two children born to Dave and Lori Tappan. She began playing soccer at age of 5 and joined club team Pacific Northwest SC. She attended Liberty High School, where she played three years of basketball in addition to soccer. With the soccer team, she played as a center back and helped Liberty win two consecutive state championships. In the 2017 final, Tappan was responsible for two of the team's three assists in their 3–0 victory over Columbia River.

== College career ==
At the age of 15, Tappan committed to Washington State University. In her freshman season with the Cougars, she played in all 21 matches, starting all but 4. She worked together with the Washington State backline to form a defense that was second in the Pac-12 Conference in terms of goals allowed. The following season, she kicked off the year with her first collegiate assist, a throw-in to Margie Detrizio in the season opener. In both her sophomore and junior seasons, she started all 19 games of the campaign. She also led the team in minutes as a junior.

Tappan capped off her college career with a senior season that earned her a spot on the All-WCC First Team after playing every single minute of the year. On October 19, 2024, she conceded a penalty kick in an eventual 4–3 loss to Gonzaga after committing a handball inside the box. However, just 15 minutes later, she atoned for her error by scoring a penalty kick of her own, which was also her first college goal. She ended up making a total of 78 appearances for the Washington State, starring in every match available to the Cougars. Tappan was also a 2024 WCC All-Academic Honorable mention and a one-year team captain.

== Club career ==
=== Spokane Zephyr ===
After leaving college, Tappan spent two weeks as a trialist with Spokane Zephyr FC before signing a contract with the club on February 22, 2025. She made her professional debut on March 15, coming on as a second-half substitute in a 3–2 win over DC Power FC. On April 3, she recorded her first start with Spokane, playing 90 minutes in a victory over Brooklyn FC. Tappan made 6 appearances in her rookie season as Spokane finished 5th in the USL Super League standings, one spot shy from the playoffs.

Tappan kicked off her second professional season on a positive note, receiving recognition on the October 2025 USL Super League Team of the Month after leading the league in passes and having the second-highest number of clearances that month. On March 14, 2026, she scored her first professional goal, a header to open the scoring in a 3–0 victory over Brooklyn. Tappan ended up playing every minute of Spokane's season, becoming one of the league's five Iron Women for 2025–26, and ranked first in the league in blocks. She earned USL Super League All-League Second Team honors for her performances. In May 2026, the Zephyr folded after two seasons.

=== Carolina Ascent ===
In July 2026, Tappan joined fellow USL Super League club Carolina Ascent alongside former Zephyr teammate Hope Hisey. She made her club debut on August 15, 2026, contributing to a 1–0 victory over DC Power FC to open the season. Two matches later, she scored her first goal for the Ascent, heading in the equalizer against the Tampa Bay Sun. Her performances in central defense alongside Jenna Butler earned her a spot on the August league Team of the Month.

== Career statistics ==
=== Club ===
As of August 15, 2026

Appearances and goals by club, season and competition
Club	Season	League			Cup		Playoffs (Note: Includes USL Super League playoffs)		Total	
Club	Season	Division	Apps	Goals	Apps	Goals	Apps	Goals	Apps	Goals
Spokane Zephyr FC	2024–25	USL Super League	6	0	—		—		6	0
Spokane Zephyr FC	2025–26	USL Super League	28	1	—		—		28	1
Career total			34	1	0	0	0	0	34	1

== Honors and awards ==
Individual

- USL Super League All-League Second Team: 2025–26
- First-team All-WCC: 2024
