= Eastside FC =

American soccer team

- Full name: Eastside Football Club
- Founded: 1970
- League: Elite Clubs National League
- Did not play (COVID-19)
- Website: https://www.eastsidefc.org/

Eastside Football Club is a soccer club from Issaquah, Washington that fields boys' and girls' teams in the Elite Clubs National League and Washington State's Regional Club League.

They formerly competed in the Northwest Division of USL League Two.

Eastside FC was founded in 1970 as a youth soccer club. In 2016, they became an affiliate club of Major League Soccer team Seattle Sounders FC. After the 2019 USL League Two season, the Sounders decided to withdraw their U-23 team from the league, where they would be replaced by Eastside FC, who would use their own name and branding, rather than the Sound FC name.

== Year-by-year ==
Year	Tier	League	Regular season	Playoffs	U.S. Open Cup
2021	4	USL2	Did not play due to COVID-19 pandemic		
