= Ally Cook =

American soccer player (born 2000)

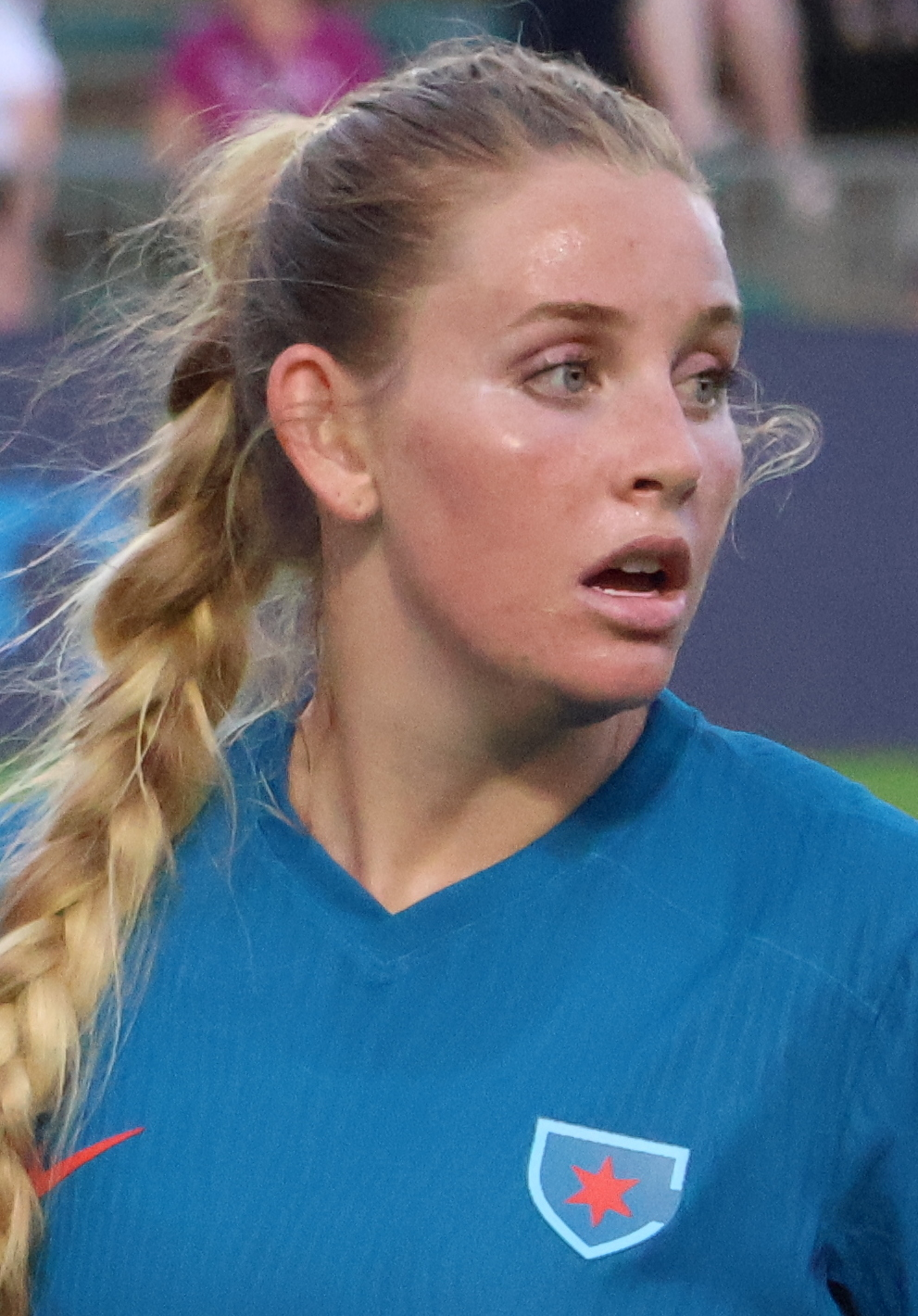
- Cook with the Chicago Red Stars in 2024

Personal information
- Full name: Allison McKenna Cook
- Date of birth: July 18, 2000 (age 26)
- Place of birth: Mission Viejo, California, U.S.
- Position: Forward

Team information
- Current team: Dallas Trinity
- Number: 33

Youth career
- West Coast FC
- Orange County Surf
- Tesoro Titans

College career
| Years | Team | Apps | (Gls) |
| 2019–2021 | Oregon Ducks | 54 | (17) |
| 2022–2023 | UCLA Bruins | 44 | (14) |

Senior career*
| Years | Team | Apps | (Gls) |
| 2024 | Chicago Red Stars | 14 | (0) |
| 2025–2026 | Spokane Zephyr | 33 | (11) |
| 2026– | Dallas Trinity | 0 | (0) |
- * Club domestic league appearances and goals as of 22:57, May 18, 2026 (UTC)

Allison McKenna Cook (born July 18, 2000) is an American professional soccer player who plays as a forward for USL Super League club Dallas Trinity. She played college soccer for the Oregon Ducks and the UCLA Bruins, winning the 2022 national championship with the Bruins.

== Early life ==
Cook was born in Mission Viejo, California on July 18, 2000, to Cathy and Matt Cook. She has three siblings: Keegan, Madi, and Kaitlyn. She grew up in Coto de Caza, California. She played club soccer for West Coast Futbol Club and then Orange County Surf SC. She played high school soccer for Tesoro High School, where she also ran track.

== College career ==
=== Oregon Ducks ===
Cook attended the University of Oregon and played for the Ducks as a forward from 2019 through 2021. Cook played three seasons for Oregon, earning third-team All-Pac 12 honors after leading the team with eight goals as a junior in 2021.

=== UCLA Bruins ===
After graduating from the University of Oregon early, Cook transferred to the University of California, Los Angeles to play for the Bruins for two seasons (2022, 2023). In 2022, she played in all 25 games and made 15 starts. In 2023, Cook started and played in all 19 of the Bruin's games and logged 1,273 minutes. Across her career at UCLA, Cook scored 14 goals and made four assists.

== Club career ==
=== Chicago Red Stars ===
After going undrafted in the 2024 NWSL Draft, Cook was contacted by several NWSL teams to join their preseason rosters. Ultimately, she trained the Chicago Red Stars as a non-rostered invitee prior to the beginning of the season. On March 13, 2024, the Red Stars signed Cook to a one-year contract with a one-year option. In the Red Stars' opening match against the Utah Royals, Cook logged her first professional assist in the 77th minute and helped her team win 2–0.

=== Spokane Zephyr ===
Cook signed for USL Super League club Spokane Zephyr on January 17, 2025. In May 2026, the club folded after two seasons. Cook had netted 11 goals in her time with Spokane, making her the Zephyr's all-time leading goalscorer.

=== Dallas Trinity ===
In July 2026, Cook signed with fellow USL Super League club Dallas Trinity alongside former Zephyr teammate Sophia Braun.

== Honors ==
UCLA Bruins

- NCAA Division I women's soccer tournament: 2022
