= Izzy Nino =

American soccer player (born 1999)

Personal information
- Full name: Isobel Anne Nino
- Date of birth: 28 July 1999 (age 27)
- Place of birth: Northville, Michigan, United States
- Height: 1.85 m (6 ft 1 in)
- Position: Goalkeeper

College career
Years	Team	Apps	(Gls)
2018–2022	Michigan Wolverines	29	(0)

Senior career*
Years	Team	Apps	(Gls)
2023–2024	Newcastle Jets	22	(0)
2024–2026	Spokane Zephyr	7	(0)
- * Club domestic league appearances and goals as of 13 May 2025

Isobel Anne Nino (born 28 July 1999) is an American professional soccer player who most recently played as a goalkeeper for USL Super League club Spokane Zephyr. She played college soccer for the Michigan Wolverines.

== Early life and college career ==
Nino was born on 28 July 1999 in Northville, Michigan, United States to alumni of the University of Michigan in the United States. Growing up in Ann Arbor, Michigan, United States, she played volleyball as a child. After graduating high school, she attended the University of Michigan in the United States, where she studied neuroscience.

== Club career ==
=== Newcastle Jets ===
Nino started her career with Australian side Newcastle Jets FC, where she made twenty-two league appearances and scored zero goals. Initially, she had intended to not play soccer professionally. On 14 October 2023, she debuted for the club during a 1–0 away over Central Coast Mariners FC in the league. Australian newspaper Gloucester Advocate wrote in 2024 that she "gone from strength to strength" while playing for them.

=== Spokane Zephyr ===
Ahead of the 2024–25 season, she signed for American side Spokane Zephyr FC. On 18 August 2024, she debuted for the club during a 1–1 home draw with Fort Lauderdale United FC in the league. In May 2026, the club folded after two seasons.
