= Haley Thomas =

American soccer player (born 1999)

Personal information
- Full name: Haley Marie Thomas
- Date of birth: February 18, 1999 (age 27)
- Place of birth: La Grande, Oregon, U.S.
- Height: 5 ft 7 in (1.70 m)
- Position: Defender

Team information
- Current team: Fort Lauderdale United
- Number: 12

Youth career
- Three Rivers SC

College career
Years	Team	Apps	(Gls)
2017–2021	Weber State Wildcats	58	(2)
2021	Boston College Eagles	18	(0)

Senior career*
Years	Team	Apps	(Gls)
2022–2023	ÍBV	39	(0)
2024	MSV Duisburg	11	(0)
2024–2026	Spokane Zephyr	50	(2)
2026–	Fort Lauderdale United	0	(0)
- * Club domestic league appearances and goals as of 23:01, May 18, 2026 (UTC)

Haley Marie Thomas (born February 18, 1999) is an American professional soccer player who plays as a defender for USL Super League club Fort Lauderdale United FC. She played college soccer for the Weber State Wildcats and Boston College Eagles. She has previously been a member of professional clubs ÍBV and MSV Duisburg in Europe, and Spokane Zephyr FC in the USLS.

== Early life ==
Thomas was born in La Grande, Oregon, as one of 5 children born to Marlow and Tyler Thomas. She grew up in Kennewick, Washington, and played youth club soccer for Three Rivers SC. Thomas originally did not plan to play in high school, but she later changed her mind and was a four-year starter at center back for Southridge High School. She played a role in multiple playoff runs with Southridge, including a second-place state title run in 2014. Thomas won multiple All-League and All-State honors in her youth career.

== College career ==
=== Weber State Wildcats ===
Although she had formerly tabbed Eastern Washington University as her top university choice, Thomas ended up at Weber State. In her first season with the Wildcats, she was a Big Sky All-Conference Honorable Mention after playing in 14 games. She scored her first collegiate goal on August 25, 2017, netting a long-range strike that proved to be the game-winner over North Dakota State.

As a sophomore, Thomas started all 18 games and recorded 1 assist. She was named to the All-Conference Second Team, an achievement which was trumped the following year when she was named to the 2019 First Team. In her final year at Weber State, Thomas was once again named to the Big Sky first team and received Co-defensive Big Sky MVP honors. She finished her Wildcat career with 58 appearances (all starts) and as the team leader in minutes in all seasons but one.

=== Boston College Eagles ===
After her four seasons at Weber State, Thomas took advantage of the extra year of NCAA eligibility offered to players due to the COVID-19 pandemic and played a fifth season with the Boston College Eagles. She started all 18 of Boston College's matches and played the second-highest minutes on the team.

== Club career ==
=== ÍBV ===
On February 2, 2022, Thomas signed her first professional contract with Icelandic club ÍBV. She quickly rose to prominence on the team and was named club captain. Thomas scored her first professional goal on June 10, 2022, in a domestic cup defeat to Stjarnan. She ended the season as team MVP after having played every minute of the Besta deild kvenna. Thomas subsequently re-signed with ÍBV, returning to the club for a second season. She built upon her success, playing in 21 games and starting each one. At the end of 2023, Thomas departed from ÍBV.

=== MSV Duisburg ===
Thomas joined MSV Duisburg of the Frauen-Bundesliga on January 18, 2024, signing a contract through the second half of the 2023–24 campaign. She made her club debut ten days later, playing 90 minutes in a 2–1 defeat to 1. FC Nürnberg. At the end of the season, Duisburg were relegated to the 2. Frauen-Bundesliga, but instead dropped from the professional ranks and joined the Regionalliga due to financial difficulties.

=== Spokane Zephyr ===
On June 20, 2024, Thomas signed with Spokane Zephyr FC ahead of the inaugural USL Super League season. Thomas's move both reunited her with Duisburg teammate Taryn Ries and brought her back to her home state. On September 22, 2024, she scored a game-winning diving header that helped Spokane beat DC Power FC and earn the club's first-ever victory. She also contributed throughout the season defensively and was named to the USL Super League Team of the Month in March 2025 after registering 22 clearances and winning 15 duels.

In her second season in Spokane, Thomas missed the Zephyr's first four matches as she recovered from a head injury. After returning to the field, she quickly re-inserted herself into Spokane's starting lineup, starting in all but 2 of her 24 matches across the campaign. In May 2026, the Zephyr folded after two seasons.

=== Fort Lauderdale United ===
On July 15, 2026, Thomas was announced to have signed for fellow USL Super League team Fort Lauderdale United FC. She was named Fort Lauderdale's club captain the following month. On August 19, 2026, she made her Fort Lauderdale debut, starting and playing the entirety of the team's season-opening loss to Sporting JAX.

== Career statistics ==
=== Club ===
As of July 1, 2026

Appearances and goals by club, season and competition
Club	Season	League			Cup (Note: Includes the Icelandic Women's Football Cup and DFB-Pokal)		Playoffs		Total	
Club	Season	Division	Apps	Goals	Apps	Goals	Apps	Goals	Apps	Goals
ÍBV	2022	Besta deild kvenna	18	0	2	1	—		20	1
ÍBV	2023	Besta deild kvenna	21	0	2	0	—		23	0
ÍBV	Total		39	0	4	1	0	0	43	1
MSV Duisburg	2023–24	Frauen-Bundesliga	11	0	0	0	—		11	0
Spokane Zephyr FC	2024–25	USL Super League	26	2	—		—		26	2
Spokane Zephyr FC	2025–26	USL Super League	24	0	—		—		24	0
Spokane Zephyr FC	Total		50	2	0	0	0	0	50	2
Career total			100	2	4	1	0	0	104	3

== Honors and awards ==
Individual

- First-team All-Big Sky: 2019, 2020
- Second-team All-Big Sky: 2018
- All-Big Sky honorable mention: 2017
- Big Sky Conference co-defensive MVP: 2020
