= Sydney Cummings =

Guyanese footballer (born 1999)

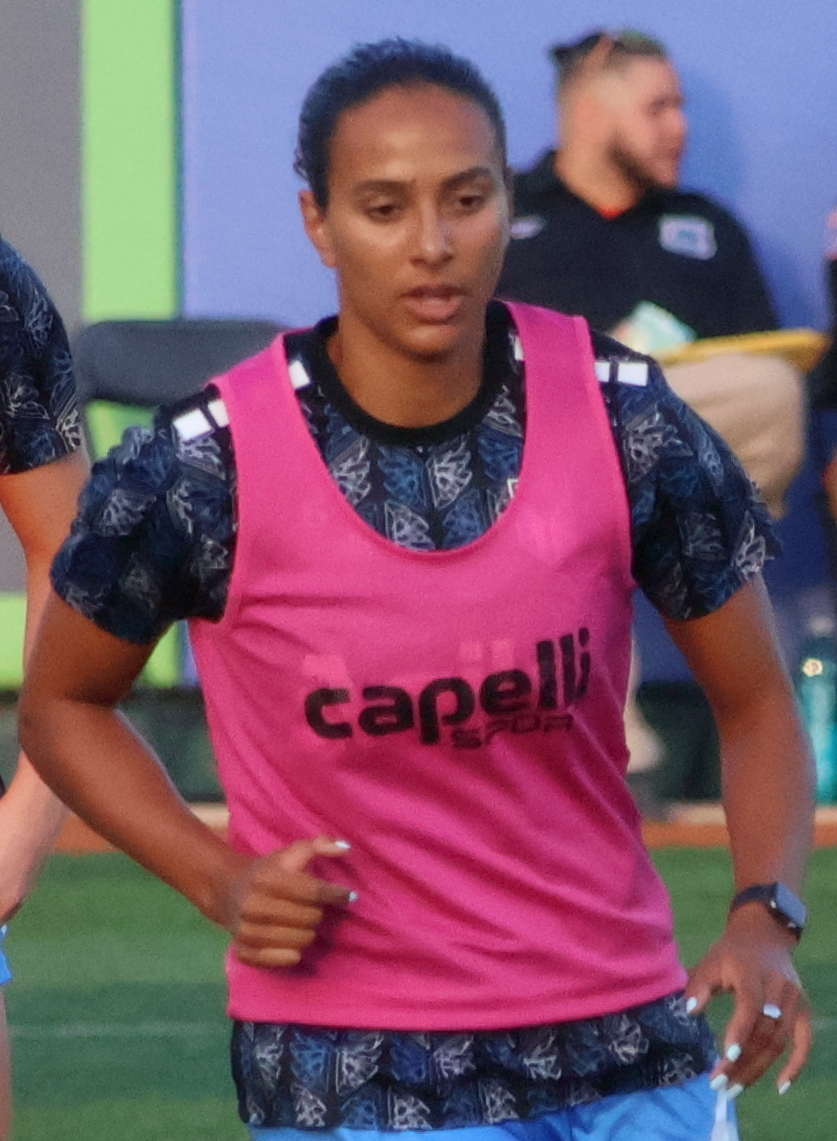
- Cummings with DC Power FC in 2026

Personal information
- Full name: Sydney Ann Cummings
- Date of birth: 5 March 1999 (age 27)
- Place of birth: Millstone Township, New Jersey, U.S.
- Height: 1.78 m (5 ft 10 in)
- Position: Center back

Team information
- Current team: DC Power FC
- Number: 6

Youth career
- St. John Vianney Lancers
- FC Copa

College career
Years	Team	Apps	(Gls)
2017–2020	Brown Bears	52	(2)
2021	Georgetown Hoyas	22	(5)

Senior career*
Years	Team	Apps	(Gls)
2022	San Diego Wave	0	(0)
2022–2023	Western United	20	(4)
2023	San Diego Wave	0	(0)
2023–2024	Celtic F.C. Women	6	(1)
2024–2025	Spokane Zephyr	21	(3)
2025–	DC Power FC	28	(1)

International career^{‡}
2018–	Guyana	5+	(4)
- * Club domestic league appearances and goals as of 17 May 2026 ‡ National team caps and goals as of 12 April 2022

Sydney Ann Cummings (born 5 March 1999) is a professional footballer who plays as a center back for USL Super League club DC Power FC. Born in the United States, she represents Guyana internationally. She played college soccer for the Brown Bears and the Georgetown Hoyas, earning All-American honors twice.

== Club career ==
Cummings was selected 42nd overall by Racing Louisville FC in the 2022 NWSL Draft, but did not sign with the team.

San Diego Wave of the National Women's Soccer League signed Cummings as a national team replacement player on July 1, 2022, and again on June 27, 2023.

In September 2022, Cummings joined A-League Women expansion club Western United as their 4th and final international player.

In September 2023, Cummings signed for Scottish Women's Premier League side Celtic FC Women.

In June 2024, Cummings signed with USL Super League club Spokane Zephyr FC for the league's inaugural season.

On June 27, 2025, Cummings signed with fellow USLS club DC Power FC. In her first season with DC, she was one of the Super League's five iron women of the season, playing every minute of DC's matches. She was also named to the league's All-League Second Team at the end of the season.

== International goals ==
Scores and results list Guyana's goal tally first

No.	Date	Venue	Opponent	Score	Result	Competition	Ref.
1	25 May 2018	Synthetic Track and Field Facility, Leonora, Guyana	Suriname	4–1	6–1	2018 CONCACAF Women's Championship qualification	
2	17 February 2022	Synthetic Track and Field Facility, Leonora, Guyana	Dominica	3–0	4–0	2022 CONCACAF W Championship qualification	
3	13 April 2022	Dwight Yorke Stadium, Bacolet, Trinidad and Tobago	Trinidad and Tobago	1–0	2–2	2022 CONCACAF W Championship qualification	
4	13 April 2022	Dwight Yorke Stadium, Bacolet, Trinidad and Tobago	Trinidad and Tobago	2–1	2–2	2022 CONCACAF W Championship qualification	

== Honors and awards ==
Individual

- USL Super League All-League Second Team: 2025–26
- Second-team All-American: 2019, 2021
- Big East Defensive Player of the Year: 2021
- First-team All-Big East: 2021
- First-team All-Ivy: 2019
- Second-team All-Ivy: 2017, 2018

== See also ==
- List of Guyana women's international footballers
