= Katie Murray =

American soccer player

Personal information
- Full name: Katie Lyn Murray
- Date of birth: January 16, 1997 (age 29)
- Place of birth: Cincinnati, Ohio, U.S.
- Height: 1.57 m (5 ft 2 in)
- Position: Midfielder

Team information
- Current team: Lexington SC
- Number: 26

Youth career
- –2014: Kings Hammer
- 2011–2014: Oak Hills Highlanders

College career
Years	Team	Apps	(Gls)
2015–2018	Illinois Fighting Illini	73	(13)

Senior career*
Years	Team	Apps	(Gls)
2016	Dayton Dutch Lions		(1)
2019	IK Myran	23	(0)
2020	UD Tenerife	1	(0)
2021–2022	PEC Zwolle	18	(0)
2022	Washington Spirit	0	(0)
2024–2026	Spokane Zephyr	33	(3)
2026–	Lexington SC	1	(0)
- * Club domestic league appearances and goals as of 205:31, August 16, 2026 (UTC)

Katie Lyn Murray (born January 16, 1997) is an American professional soccer player who plays as a midfielder for USL Super League club Lexington SC. She played college soccer for the Illinois Fighting Illini.

== Career ==
Murray attended the University of Illinois. She played for the university's team, from 2015–18. After graduating, she signed for IK Myran in Finland. On January 13, 2020, Murray signed for the Spanish team Granadilla Tenerife.

Murray signed with the Washington Spirit of the National Women's Soccer League in June 2022 as a national team replacement player. She returned to the Spirit in January 2023 as a pre-season non-roster invitee.

On June 28, 2024, it was announced that Murray had signed with Spokane Zephyr ahead of the inaugural USL Super League season. In May 2026, the club folded after two seasons.

On June 25, 2026, Murray signed with reigning USL Super League champions Lexington SC. She made her club debut on August 15, 2026, earning the start in Lexington's season-opening win over Brooklyn FC.

== Honors and awards ==
Individual

- Second-team All-Big Ten: 2018
