= Marley Canales =

American association football player

Personal information
- Full name: Marley Angelina Canales
- Date of birth: November 16, 1997 (age 28)
- Place of birth: Salt Lake City, United States
- Height: 5 ft 4 in (1.63 m)
- Position: Midfielder

College career
| Years | Team | Apps | (Gls) |
| 2017–2021 | UCLA Bruins | 79 | (11) |

Senior career*
| Years | Team | Apps | (Gls) |
| 2022–2023 | OL Reign | 3 | (0) |
| 2024–2025 | Spokane Zephyr | 17 | (1) |

International career
| 2016 | United States U20 | | |
| 2018 | United States U23 | | |
- * Club domestic league appearances and goals as of June 30, 2025

Marley Angelina Canales (born November 16, 1997) is an American former professional soccer player who played as a midfielder.

== Club career ==
OL Reign drafted Canales in the 2022 NWSL Draft. She signed with the team in April 2022, and made her NWSL debut on May 1, 2022. Canales was waived from the club on November 20, 2023.

Ahead of the 2024 NWSL season, Canales was included in San Diego Wave FC's preseason squad as a non-roster invitee. She traveled with the Wave to the Coachella Valley Invitational preseason tournament, scoring one goal in a 2–1 defeat to Portland Thorns FC on February 24, 2024.

On May 14, 2024, Canales was announced as the first-ever signing for USL Super League club Spokane Zephyr FC.

== Personal life ==
In early 2026, Canales married Kyle Cuellar.

== Honors ==
OL Reign

- NWSL Shield: 2022
- The Women's Cup: 2022
