= Sophia Braun =

Argentine footballer (born 2000)

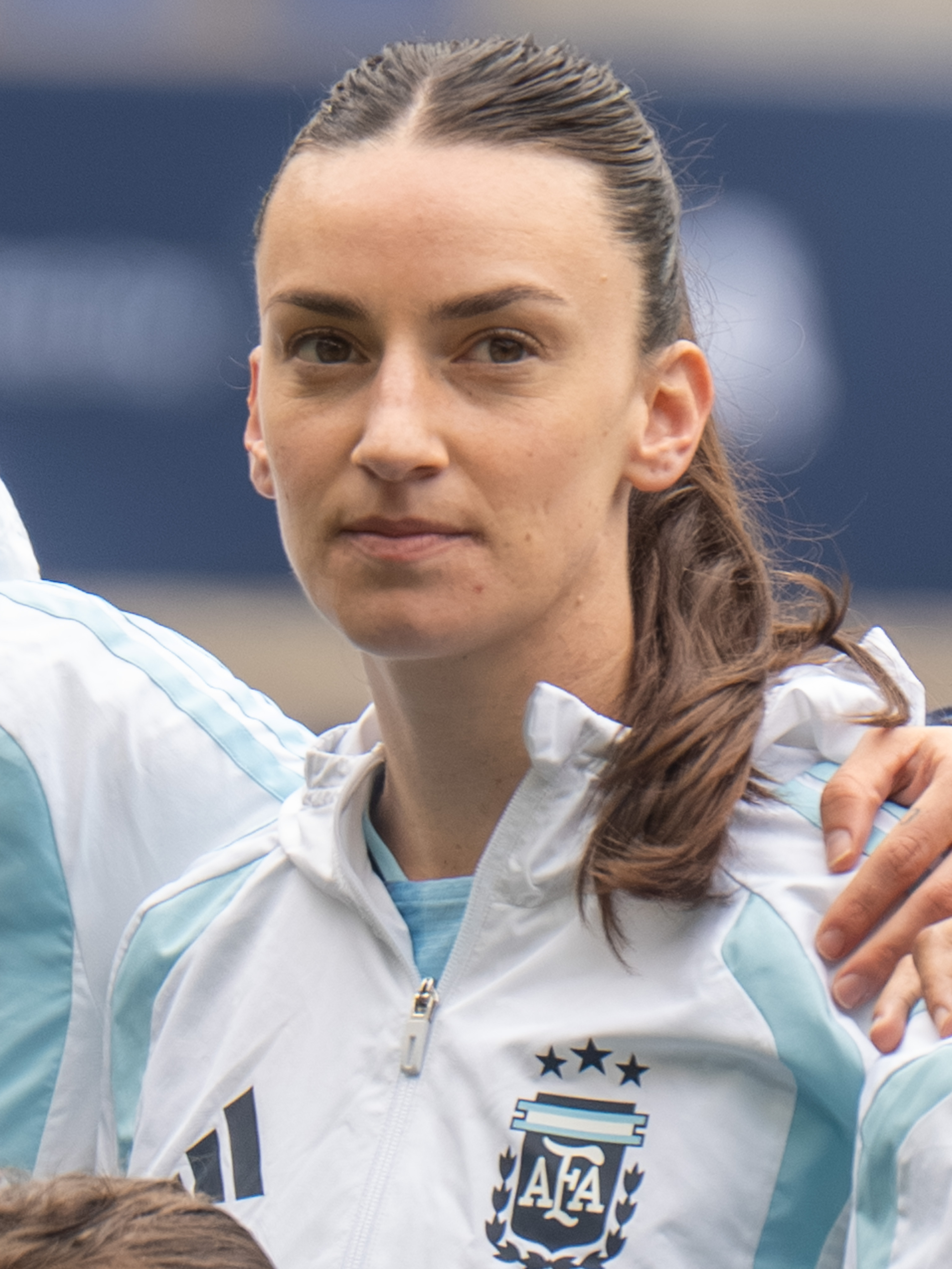
- Braun in 2026

Personal information
- Full name: Sophie Wais Braun
- Date of birth: 26 January 2000 (age 26)
- Place of birth: Beaverton, Oregon, U.S.
- Height: 1.70 m (5 ft 7 in)
- Position: Midfielder

Team information
- Current team: Dallas Trinity
- Number: 8

Youth career
- Jesuit Crusaders

College career
Years	Team	Apps	(Gls)
2018–2022	Gonzaga Bulldogs	82	(9)

Senior career*
Years	Team	Apps	(Gls)
2023	León	22	(1)
2024	Kansas City Current	0	(0)
2024	→ Spokane Zephyr (loan)	10	(0)
2025–2026	Spokane Zephyr	36	(0)
2026–	Dallas Trinity	0	(0)

International career^{‡}
2020	Argentina U20	4	(1)
2021–	Argentina	55	(2)
Medal record
Women's football
Representing Argentina
Copa América Femenina
Third place	2022 Colombia
Third place	2025 Ecuador
- * Club domestic league appearances and goals as of 18 May 2026 ‡ National team caps and goals as of 15 April 2026

Sophie Wais Braun (born 26 January 2000), known as Sophia Braun, is a professional footballer who plays as a midfielder for USL Super League club Dallas Trinity. Born in the United States, she plays for the Argentina national team. Braun played college soccer for the Gonzaga Bulldogs.

== Early life and college ==
Braun was raised in Beaverton, Oregon to an American father and an Argentine mother. Braun attended the Jesuit High School in Beaverton, Oregon and Gonzaga University in Spokane, Washington. She focussed on learning English at home but later began to learn how to speak Spanish after regular visits back to Argentina to see her grandparents.

== Club career ==
Braun started playing football whilst training with Club Atlético River Plate. In 2022, after graduating from university, she signed for the Mexican Liga MX Femenil side Club León.

Braun joined National Women's Soccer League club Kansas City Current on 30 January 2024.

In July 2024, Kansas City loaned Braun to USL Super League club Spokane Zephyr for the remainder of the NWSL season, making her the first NWSL player loaned to the new league. On 10 December 2024, Current declined Braun's option for 2025, making her a free agent. She subsequently signed with the Zephyr on a permanent deal. In May 2026, the club folded after two seasons.

In July 2026, Braun joined fellow USL Super League club Dallas Trinity along with former Zephyr teammate Ally Cook.

== International career ==
Braun first represented Argentina at the 2020 South American Under-20 Women's Football Championship. She made her senior debut on February 18, 2021, in a 1–4 loss to Brazil at that year's edition of the SheBelieves Cup. Her Argentina teammates often insist on spelling her first name as "Sofi" in keeping with Argentine heritage. Braun scored Argentina's first goal at the 2023 FIFA Women's World Cup.

== Career statistics ==
=== International ===
As of match played 14 April 2026

Appearances and goals by national team and year
National team	Year	Apps	Goals
Argentina	2021	5	0
Argentina	2022	9	0
Argentina	2023	12	2
Argentina	2024	10	0
Argentina	2025	14	0
Argentina	2026	5	0
Total		55	2

=== International goals ===
No.	Date	Venue	Opponent	Score	Result	Competition
1	9 April 2023	Estadio Carlos Augusto Mercado Luna, La Rioja, Argentina	Venezuela	1–0	3–0	Friendly
2	28 July 2023	Forsyth Barr Stadium, Dunedin, New Zealand	South Africa	1–2	2–2	2023 FIFA Women's World Cup
