= Natalie Viggiano =

American soccer player (born 2000)

Personal information
- Full name: Natalie Nicole Viggiano
- Date of birth: February 23, 2000 (age 26)
- Place of birth: Troy, Michigan, US
- Height: 5 ft 4 in (1.63 m)
- Position: Midfielder

Team information
- Current team: Sandvikens IF

College career
Years	Team	Apps	(Gls)
2018–2022	Wisconsin Badgers	83	(16)

Senior career*
Years	Team	Apps	(Gls)
2023	OL Reign	0	(0)
2023	Damaiense		
2024	ÍBV		
2024–2026	Spokane Zephyr	27	(0)
2026–	Sandvikens IF	0	(0)
- * Club domestic league appearances and goals as of 03:28, December 23, 2025 (UTC)

Natalie Nicole Viggiano (born February 23, 2000) is an American professional soccer player who plays as a midfielder for Elitettan club Sandvikens IF. She played college soccer for the Wisconsin Badgers and was selected by the OL Reign in fourth round of the 2023 NWSL Draft. She is the sister of fellow soccer player Marisa DiGrande.

== Early life ==
Viggiano grew up in Troy, Michigan. She previously played for Dakota High School in the nearby Macomb Township.

== College career ==
At the collegiate level, Viggiano was a member of the women's soccer team at the University of Wisconsin-Madison that won the 2019 Big Ten Conference Championship. Individually, she was a First-Team All-Big Ten selection for the 2022 season.

== Club career ==
The OL Reign selected Viggiano as the 46th overall pick of the 2023 NWSL Draft. On June 26, 2023, the Reign announced that they had signed Viggiano to her first professional deal, a national team replacement player contract. She made 3 appearances in the NWSL Challenge Cup before departing from the Reign.

Viggiano then spent a stint in Portugal for S.F. Damaiense. In February 2024, she signed with Icelandic club ÍBV.

On August 14, 2024, Viggiano was announced to have joined Spokane Zephyr FC's roster ahead of the inaugural USL Super League season. In May 2026, the club folded after two seasons.

On August 20, 2026, Swedish second-division team Sandvikens IF announced the signing of Viggiano.
