= McKenzie Weinert =

American soccer player (born 1998)

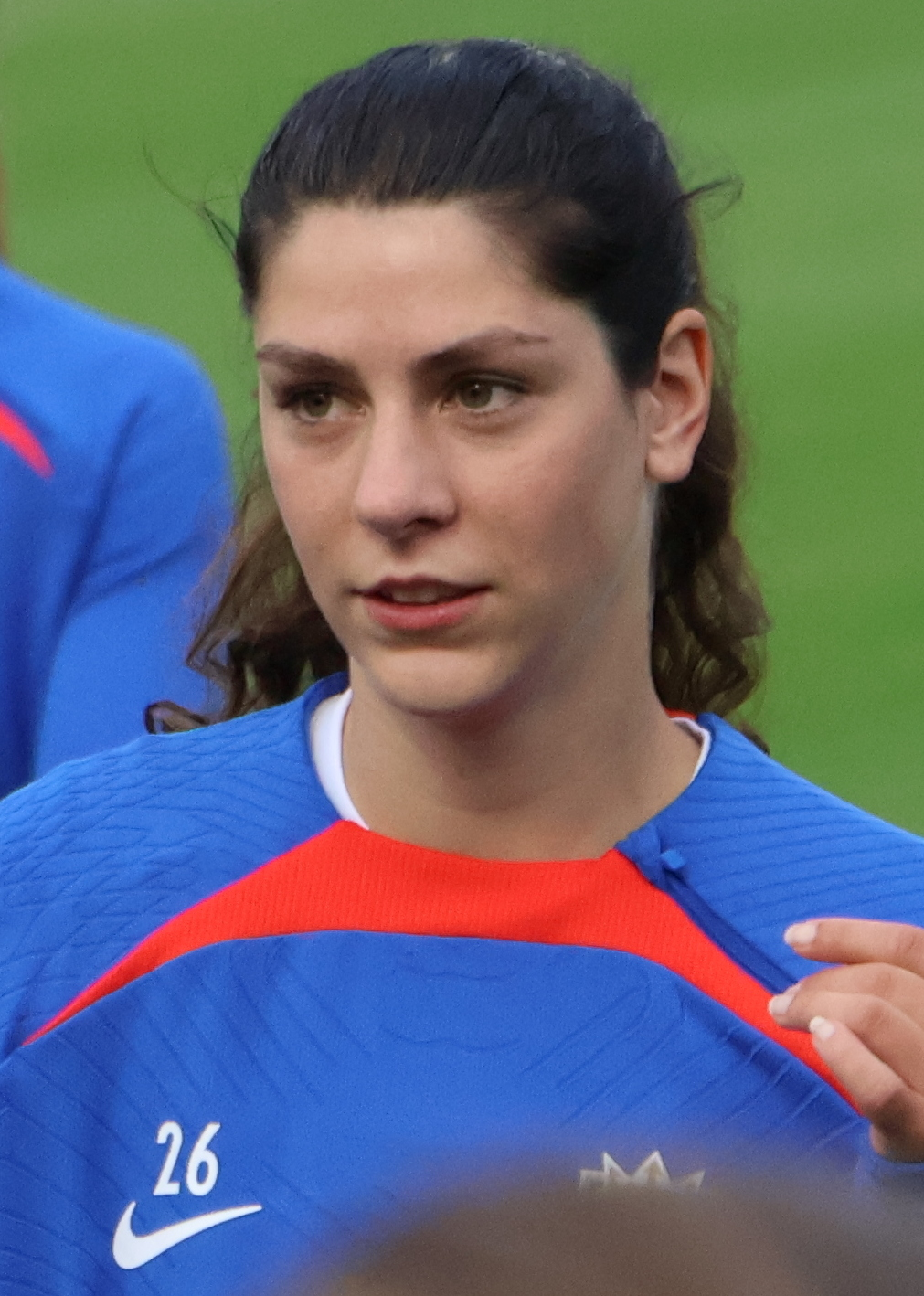
- Weinert with the Seattle Reign in 2024

Personal information
- Date of birth: December 2, 1998 (age 27)
- Height: 5 ft 4 in (1.63 m)
- Position: Forward

Team information
- Current team: Lexington SC
- Number: 11

Youth career
- Crossfire United

College career
Years	Team	Apps	(Gls)
2017–2021	Oregon State Beavers	50	(13)
2021–2022	Washington Huskies	37	(8)

Senior career*
Years	Team	Apps	(Gls)
2023	OL Reign	2	(0)
2023–2024	Melbourne Victory	17	(5)
2024–	Seattle Reign	3	(0)
2024	→ Spokane Zephyr (loan)	11	(0)
2025	Spokane Zephyr	14	(3)
2025–	Lexington SC	22	(10)
- * Club domestic league appearances and goals as of May 16, 2026

McKenzie Weinert (born December 2, 1998) is an American professional soccer player who plays as a forward for USL Super League club Lexington SC. She played college soccer for the Oregon State Beavers and Washington Huskies. She previously played for the Seattle Reign of the National Women's Soccer League (NWSL), Melbourne Victory of the A-League Women, and Spokane Zephyr of the USL Super League.

== College career ==
Weinert played for the Oregon State Beavers for four seasons. Having redshirted in 2017 and due to the extra year of eligibility granted to athletes in the 2020–21 academic year due to the COVID-19 pandemic, Weinert transferred and played another two seasons for the Washington Huskies.

== Club career ==
=== OL Reign ===
Weinert joined then-OL Reign as a replacement player in June 2023. She then signed for Australian club Melbourne Victory in September 2023.

After a successful season in Australia, Seattle Reign FC brought back Weinert in February 2024.

=== Spokane Zephyr ===
On August 5, 2024, the Reign extended Weinert through the 2025 season and loaned her to USL Super League club Spokane Zephyr FC until the end of 2024.

On December 10, 2024 the Reign announced they had waived Weinert, making her a free agent.

=== Lexington SC ===
Weinert signed with Lexington SC on June 30, 2025. She made her debut for Lexington on August 23, scoring the second goal of their season-opening 3–3 draw with Fort Lauderdale United. She finished her debut season with 10 goals in 22 games as Lexington, who finished last the previous season, won the Players' Shield with the best record in the league. In the league final, she scored a 72-minute equalizer as Lexington won 3–1 over the Carolina Ascent, becoming the first team to complete the league double.

== Honors ==
Lexington SC

- USL Super League: 2025–26
- USL Super League Players' Shield: 2025–26
