= Spokane Zephyr FC =

Women's soccer team in Spokane, Washington

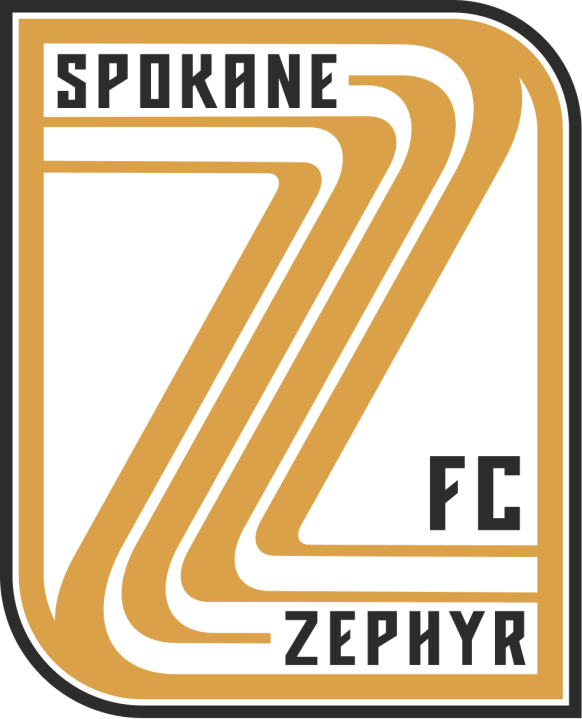
- Founded: May 16, 2023; 3 years ago
- Dissolved: May 20, 2026; 2 months ago
- Stadium: One Spokane Stadium; Spokane, Washington
- Capacity: 5,000
- Owner(s): Ryan and Katie Harnetiaux
- League: USL Super League
- Website: spokanezephyrfc.com
Home colors	Away colors

Spokane Zephyr FC was an American professional women's soccer club based in Spokane, Washington, that competed in the USL Super League (USLS) from 2024 to 2026. The club was owned by Aequus Sports, which also operates Spokane Velocity FC of USL League One (USL1).

== History ==
Aequus Sports was granted a USL Super League franchise on May 16, 2023. On November 4, 2023, the name and crest of the club were announced. Spokane would be the westernmost market in the league's inaugural season, with more West Coast teams planned in later expansions.

Zephyr FC played their inaugural match on August 17, 2024, against Fort Lauderdale United FC to a sold-out crowd on their home field at ONE Spokane Stadium, drawing 1–1. Emina Ekić scored the club's first goal off a penalty kick. In their first season in the USL Super League, Zephyr FC finished 5th and did not qualify for the playoffs due to the head-to-head tiebreaker. In their second season, the Zephyr finished just below playoff qualification with a 10–9–9 record. Attendance at home matches fell from an average of 2,500 in the inaugural season to an announced 1,500 in the second season.

On May 20, 2026, Aequus Sports announced that Zephyr FC would cease operations immediately. The announcement was made by the team's owners to players at a locker room meeting and initially not released to the public. During their tenure in the USL Super League, Zephyr FC had the longest travel distances of any team; their nearest opponents were Dallas Trinity FC at 1,500 miles (2,400 km).

== Stadium ==
The team played at One Spokane Stadium, an outdoor venue in Downtown Spokane with over 5,000 seats. Aequus Sports signed a 10-year agreement with the Spokane Public Facilities District (PFD) to lease the stadium. The PFD upgraded the stadium's locker rooms for use by professional soccer teams at a cost of $4 million, which was expected to be reimbursed by the ownership group. The 2025 deadline for payment was initially missed but later met shortly before the PFD were scheduled to vote on the termination of the lease.

== Club identity ==
The Zephyr name and primary colors—Basalt Black and Palouse Gold—refer to the Inland Northwest's geography. The Z in the logo is a reference to the west wind, that "sweeps in and reshapes the landscape."

== Players and staff ==
=== Final roster ===
As of February 18, 2026

Note: Flags indicate national team as defined under FIFA eligibility rules; some limited exceptions apply. Players may hold more than one non-FIFA nationality.

No.	Pos.	Nation	Player
0	GK	USA	Hope Hisey
1	GK	USA	Izzy Nino
2	DF	USA	Reese Tappan
3	MF	USA	Emma Jaskaniec
5	DF	USA	Sarah McCoy
6	FW	ECU	Kaira Houser
7	DF	USA	Kelsey Oyler
8	FW	USA	Lena Silano
9	FW	USA	Cameron Tucker
11	DF	USA	Shea Collins
13	MF	ARG	Sophia Braun
14	FW	USA	Maya Hansen
15	DF	USA	Natalie Viggiano

No.	Pos.	Nation	Player
16	MF	USA	Felicia Knox
17	DF	USA	Madelyn Desiano
18	DF	USA	Haley Thomas
19	FW	USA	Tori Waldeck Zierenberg
22	DF	USA	Charley Boone
23	DF	USA	Ginger Fontenot
24	GK	USA	Cece Villa
25	MF	USA	Catherine Rapp
26	MF	USA	Katie Murray
30	FW	BRA	Thais Reiss
31	GK	USA	Hailey Coll
32	MF	USA	Maggie Johnston
33	FW	USA	Ally Cook

==== Academy players ====
Note: Flags indicate national team as defined under FIFA eligibility rules; some limited exceptions apply. Players may hold more than one non-FIFA nationality.

No.	Pos.	Nation	Player
27	GK	FIJ	Aliana Vakaloloma

=== Final staff ===
As of October 9, 2025

Coaching staff
Head coach	Nicole Lukic
Assistant coach	Sly Yeates
Front Office Staff
President, USL Spokane	Katie Harnetiaux

== Records ==
=== Year-by-year ===
As of May 16, 2026

Season	League	Regular season								Playoffs	Avg. attendance
Season	League	P	W	D	L	GF	GA	Pts	Pos	Playoffs	Avg. attendance
2024–25	USLS	28	11	9	8	37	32	42	5th	DNQ	2,537
2025–26	USLS	28	10	9	9	34	28	39	5th	DNQ	1,566

=== Head coaching record ===
As of October 7, 2025

Only competitive matches are counted.*

All-time Spokane Zephyr FC coaching records
Name	Nationality	From	To	P	W	D	L	GF	GA	Win%
Jo Johnson	United States	June 25, 2024	June 3, 2025	28	11	9	8	37	32	39.29
Josh McAllister (interim)	United States	June 18, 2025	October 7, 2025	8	2	4	2	9	6	25
Nicole Lukic	United States	October 7, 2025		0	0	0	0	0	0	0

=== Team records ===
Most appearances
Player					Appearances		
#	Name	Nat.	Pos.	Zephyr career	USLS	Playoffs	Total
1	Emma Jaskaniec	(United States)	MF	2024–2026	55	0	55
2	Sarah McCoy	(United States)	DF	2024–2026	52	0	52
3	Haley Thomas	(United States)	DF	2024–2026	50	0	50
4	Hope Hisey	(United States)	GK	2024–2026	49	0	49
5	Sophia Braun	(Argentina)	MF	2024–2026	46	0	46
6	Reese Tappan	(United States)	DF	2025–2026	34	0	34
7	Ally Cook	(United States)	FW	2025–2026	33	0	33
7	Katie Murray	(United States)	MF	2024–2026	33	0	33
9	Lena Silano	(United States)	FW	2025–2026	28	0	28
10	Kelsey Oyler	(United States)	DF	2025–2026	27	0	27
10	Natalie Viggiano	(United States)	FW	2024–2026	27	0	27

Top goalscorers
Player					Goals scored		
#	Name	Nat.	Pos.	Zephyr career	USLS	Playoffs	Total
1	Ally Cook	(United States)	FW	2025–2026	11	0	11
2	Emina Ekić	(Bosnia and Herzegovina)	MF	2024–2025	10	0	10
3	Lena Silano	(United States)	FW	2025–2026	7	0	7
4	Emma Jaskaniec	(United States)	MF	2024–2026	5	0	5
5	Taylor Aylmer	(United States)	MF	2024–2025	4	0	4
5	Felicia Knox	(United States)	MF	2025–2026	4	0	4
5	Tori Waldeck Zierenberg	(United States)	FW	2025–2026	4	0	4
8	Sydney Cummings	(Guyana)	DF	2024–2025	3	0	3
8	Katie Murray	(United States)	MF	2024–2026	3	0	3
8	McKenzie Weinert	(United States)	FW	2024–2025	3	0	3
