= List of Carolina Ascent FC players =

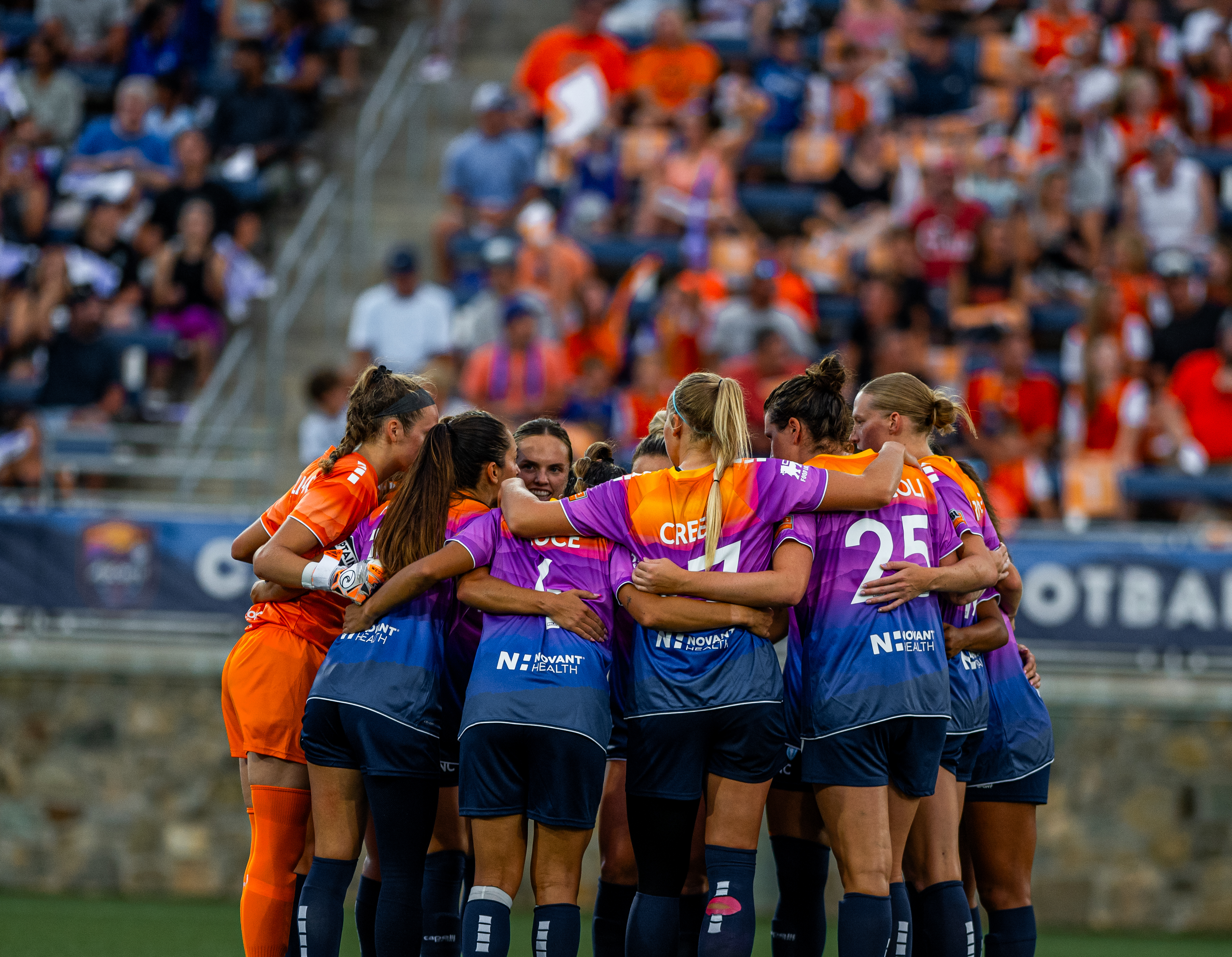
Carolina Ascent FC players in a team huddle before the team's inaugural match on August 17, 2024.

Carolina Ascent FC is an American professional women's soccer club which began play in the inaugural season of the USL Super League. All players who have made a competitive appearance for Carolina Ascent FC are listed below.

== Key ==
- The list is ordered alphabetically.
- Appearances as a substitute are included.
- Statistics are correct as of June 4, 2026, the end of the 2025–26 USL Super League season, and are updated once a year after the conclusion of the USL Super League season.
- Players whose names are highlighted in **bold** were active players on the Ascent roster as of the list's most recent update.

Positions key
GK	Goalkeeper
DF	Defender
MF	Midfielder
FW	Forward

Nationality
Unless otherwise noted, the nationality of a player is determined by the country they most recently represented in international play, or if said player has not played international football then by their country of birth.
Position
Playing positions are listed according to the player's roster designation as of the list's most recent update.
Years
Years are defined as the first and last calendar years in which the player was rostered for the club in any of the competitions listed below.
Appearances and goals
This list counts appearances and goals in the USL Super League and USL Super League playoffs.

== Players ==
Yrs	No.	Pos	Nat	Player	Total		USL Super League		Playoffs	
Yrs	No.	Pos	Nat	Player	Apps	Goals	Apps	Goals	Apps	Goals
2024–	7	DF	(Puerto Rico) PUR	Jill Aguilera	58	6	55	6	3	0
2024	24	FW	(Nigeria) NGA	Opeyemi Ajakaye	2	0	2	0	0	0
2025–	21	FW	(United States) USA	Macey Bader	2	0	2	0	0	0
2024–	10	FW	(United States) USA	Rylee Baisden	44	6	43	6	1	0
2024–2025	5	FW	(Ecuador) ECU	Jaydah Bedoya	23	3	22	3	1	0
2024–2025	4	DF	(United States) USA	Vicky Bruce (Note: Bruce was the Ascent's inaugural signing, announced on May 1, 2024. She also scored the Ascent's first goal, which was also the first goal in league history.)	20	1	20	1	0	0
2025–	20	DF	(United States) USA	Jenna Butler	44	3	41	3	3	0
2024–	18	FW	(United States) USA	Audrey Coleman (Note: Coleman recorded the Ascent's first-ever assist. It was also the first assist in league history.)	49	7	46	7	3	0
2026–	4	FW	(United States) USA	Ava Cook	13	0	12	0	1	0
2024–	9	FW	(United States) USA	Mia Corbin	57	17	54	16	3	1
2024–2025	27	DF	(United States) USA	Annika Creel	2	0	2	0	0	0
2024–	3	MF	(United States) USA	Giovanna DeMarco	16	0	16	0	0	0
2025–	31	FW	(United States) USA	Mackenzie George	30	4	28	3	2	1
2024–2025	15	MF	(Dominican Republic) DOM	Kathrynn González	23	1	22	0	1	1
2025–	11	FW	(Brazil) BRA	Luana Grabias	6	0	6	0	0	0
2026–	20	MF	(United States) USA	Shea Groom	16	1	14	1	2	0
2024–2025	21	DF	(United States) USA	Renée Guion	9	2	9	2	0	0
2024–2025	17	FW	(Israel) ISR	Eli Hutchinson	15	5	14	5	1	0
2024–	22	MF	(England) ENG	B Hylton	25	1	24	1	1	0
2025	42	GK	(United States) USA	Samantha Leshnak Murphy	11	0	11	0	0	0
2026–	17	FW	(United States) USA	Tyler Lussi	13	4	11	4	2	0
2025–	2	DF	(United States) USA	Brianna Martinez	24	1	23	1	1	0
2025–	15	GK	(Puerto Rico) PUR	Sydney Martinez	14	0	12	0	2	0
2024–	19	GK	(United States) USA	Meagan McClelland	34	0	34	0	0	0
2024	11	FW	(United States) USA	Jaida McGrew	4	0	4	0	0	0
2025	4	MF	(United States) USA	Maddie Mercado	6	4	6	4	0	0
2024–	13	DF	(United States) USA	Addisyn Merrick	36	1	33	1	3	0
2025–	24	MF	(United States) USA	Emily Morris	22	1	20	1	2	0
2024–	8	DF	(United States) USA	Emily Moxley	13	0	11	0	2	0
2026–	28	MF	(United States) USA	Lily Nabet	15	1	13	1	2	0
2025–	19	DF	(United States) USA	Meaghan Nally	15	1	13	1	2	0
2025–	23	FW	(United States) USA	Riley Parker	43	2	40	2	3	0
2025	28	MF	(United States) USA	Maggie Pierce	1	0	1	0	0	0
2024–	14	MF	(United States) USA	Taylor Porter	58	0	55	0	3	0
2024–2025	19	MF	(United States) USA	Ashlynn Serepca	25	2	25	2	0	0
2024–	70	FW	(United States) USA	Stella Spitzer	3	0	3	0	0	0
2024–2025	2	DF	(United States) USA	Josie Studer	11	0	11	0	0	0
2024–	12	DF	(United States) USA	Sydney Studer	45	4	44	4	1	0
2024–	6	FW	(United States) USA	Maria Tapia	2	0	2	0	0	0
2024–	25	MF	(United States) USA	Sarah Troccoli	24	3	23	3	1	0
2025	17	FW	(United States) USA	Alyssa Walker	10	2	10	2	0	0

== By nationality ==
In total, 41 players representing 8 different countries have appeared for Carolina Ascent FC.

Note: Countries indicate national team as defined under FIFA eligibility rules. Players may hold more than one non-FIFA nationality.

Country	Total players
Brazil	1
Dominican Republic	1
Ecuador	1
England	1
Israel	1
Nigeria	1
Puerto Rico	2
United States	33

== See also ==
- List of top-division football clubs in CONCACAF countries
- List of professional sports teams in the United States and Canada
