= 2024–25 Carolina Ascent FC season =

Inaugural Carolina Ascent FC season

Carolina Ascent FC
2024–25 season
- Head coach: Philip Poole
- Stadium: American Legion Memorial Stadium, Charlotte, North Carolina
- USL Super League: 1st
- USLS Playoffs: Semi-finals
- Top goalscorer: Mia Corbin (12 goals)
- Highest home attendance: 10,553 (Aug 17 vs. DC)
- Lowest home attendance: 2,058 (Aug 25 vs. Lexington)
- Average home league attendance: 4,032
- Biggest win: 5–0 (vs BKFC (H), April 12, 2025)
- Biggest defeat: 0–2 (vs FTL (A), December 14, 2024)
- All statistics correct as of 31 May 2025.

The 2024–25 season of Carolina Ascent FC was the team's inaugural season as a professional women's soccer team and as well as the first for the USL Super League (USLS), one of two leagues to be in the top tier of women's soccer in the United States.

== Current roster ==
As of February 16, 2025

Note: Flags indicate national team as defined under FIFA eligibility rules; some limited exceptions apply. Players may hold more than one non-FIFA nationality.

No.	Pos.	Nation	Player
1	GK	USA	Meagan McClelland
2	DF	USA	Josie Studer
3	MF	USA	Giovanna DeMarco
4	DF	USA	Vicky Bruce
5	FW	ECU	Jaydah Bedoya
7	MF	PUR	Jill Aguilera
8	DF	USA	Emily Moxley
9	FW	USA	Mia Corbin
10	FW	USA	Rylee Baisden
12	DF	USA	Sydney Studer
13	DF	USA	Addisyn Merrick
14	MF	USA	Taylor Porter (captain)

No.	Pos.	Nation	Player
15	MF	DOM	Kathrynn González
16	GK	USA	Charlotte Burge
17	MF	ISR	Eli Hutchinson
18	FW	USA	Audrey Harding
19	MF	USA	Ashlynn Serepca
20	FW	USA	Jenna Butler
21	DF	USA	Renée Guion
23	FW	USA	Riley Parker
25	MF	USA	Sarah Troccoli
27	DF	USA	Annika Creel
42	GK	USA	Samantha Leshnak Murphy
77	DF	USA	Cannon Clough

== Academy players ==
Note: Flags indicate national team as defined under FIFA eligibility rules; some limited exceptions apply. Players may hold more than one non-FIFA nationality.

No.	Pos.	Nation	Player
6	FW	USA	Maria Tapia
11	FW	USA	Jaida McGrew
22	MF	ENG	Chloe Hylton
26	DF	COL	Isabella Franco
29	GK	USA	Molly Vapensky
40	GK	USA	Riley Pickels
70	FW	USA	Stella Spitzer

== Staff ==
As of August 9, 2024*

Front office
Position	Name
CEO & Managing Partner	(United States) Jim McPhilliamy
Technical staff
Head Coach	(England) Philip Poole
Assistant General Manager	Becky Hylton
Assistant Coach	Erika Duncan
Assistant Coach	Jack Vundum
Goalkeeper Coach	Lane Davis
Assistant Coach & IDP Manager	Melanie Thomas

== Competitions ==
=== 2024-25 regular season ===
==== Results summary ====
Overall								Home						Away					
Pld	W	D	L	GF	GA	GD	Pts	W	D	L	GF	GA	GD	W	D	L	GF	GA	GD
28	13	9	6	45	24	+21	48	7	5	2	24	10	+14	6	4	4	21	14	+7

==== Regular season standings ====
Pos	Team	Pld	W	L	T	GF	GA	GD	Pts	Qualification
1	Carolina Ascent (S)	28	13	6	9	45	24	+21	48	Playoffs
2	Tampa Bay Sun (C)	28	12	6	10	42	28	+14	46	Playoffs
3	Dallas Trinity	28	12	9	7	42	30	+12	43	Playoffs
4	Fort Lauderdale United	28	11	8	9	35	33	+2	42 (Note: Head-to-head points: Fort Lauderdale 6, Spokane 3)	Playoffs
5	Spokane Zephyr	28	11	8	9	37	32	+5	42	

Source: USL Super League
Rules for classification: 1) head-to-head points; 2) total goal differential; 3) total goals scored; 4) disciplinary points; 5) drawing of lots.
(C) Champions; (S) Players' Shield winner

==== Matches ====
Carolina Ascent FC played their debut season in 2024 with the following schedule:

August 17, 2024 1	Carolina Ascent FC	1–0	DC Power FC	Charlotte, North Carolina
6:00 PM EST	Guion (yellow card) 10'; Bruce 27'; Corbin (yellow card) 90+7'	Report		Stadium: American Legion Memorial Stadium; Attendance: 10,553; Referee: Alexandra Billeter

August 25, 2024 2	Carolina Ascent FC	1–1	Lexington Sporting Club	Charlotte, North Carolina
2:30 PM EST	Studer (yellow card) 56'; Corbin 76'	Report	Parsons (yellow card) 1'; Shepherd 7'; Yeong (yellow card) 15'	Stadium: American Legion Memorial Stadium; Attendance: 2.058; Referee: Anya Voigt

August 31, 2024 3	Brooklyn FC	v	Carolina Ascent FC	New York, New York
				Stadium: Maimonides Park
Note: Match was rescheduled to October 15, 2024 due to field conditions at Maimonides Park.

September 6, 2024 4	Carolina Ascent FC	2–1	Fort Lauderdale United FC	Charlotte, North Carolina
7:30 PM EST	Guion 26'; Corbin (yellow card) 28'; Aguilera 68'; DeMarco (yellow card) 70'; Harding (yellow card) 77'	Report	Hamid 90'	Stadium: American Legion Memorial Stadium; Attendance: 3,251; Referee: Shawn Tehini

September 15, 2024 5	Spokane Zephyr FC	0–2	Carolina Ascent FC	Spokane, Washington
6:00 PM EST	Murray (yellow card) 21'; Canales (yellow card) 44'; Weinert (yellow card) 83'	Report	Corbin 30'; Studer 45+3'; Porter (yellow card) 48'; Bruce (yellow card) 48'; McGrew (yellow card) 84'	Stadium: ONE Spokane Stadium; Attendance: 2,448; Referee: Jamie Padilla

September 27, 2024 6	Carolina Ascent FC	0–0	Tampa Bay Sun FC	Charlotte, North Carolina
7:30 PM EST	DeMarco (yellow card) 37'	Report	Moore (yellow card) 90+3'	Stadium: American Legion Memorial Stadium; Attendance: 3,543; Referee: Rebecca Pagan

October 6, 2024 7	Lexington Sporting Club	1–1	Carolina Ascent FC	Lexington, Kentucky
4:00 PM EST	Mendez 90+10'	Report	Perez 37' (o.g.); Studer (yellow card) 45+2'; DeMarco (yellow card) 45+3'; Serepca (yellow card) 90+3'	Stadium: Lexington SC Stadium; Attendance: 1,496; Referee: Adorae Monroy

October 15, 2024 3	Brooklyn FC	1–1	Carolina Ascent FC	New York, New York
7:30 PM EST	Breslin (yellow card) 19'; Pantuso 54'; Hill (yellow card) 72'; Pluck (yellow card) 89'; Grabias (yellow card) 90+3'	Report	Bedoya 22'; DeMarco (yellow card) 28'	Stadium: Commisso Soccer Stadium; Attendance: 211; Referee: Danielle Chesky
Note: Match was originally scheduled for August 31 but was postponed

October 19, 2024 8	Carolina Ascent FC	2–0	Brooklyn FC	Charlotte, North Carolina
7:00 PM EST	Serepca 19', 74'	Report	Rosette (yellow card) 12'	Stadium: American Legion Memorial Stadium; Attendance: 4,223; Referee: Natalie Simon

October 25, 2024 9	Dallas Trinity FC	2–2	Carolina Ascent FC	Dallas, Texas
8:00 PM EST	Brooks 24'; Winebrenner (yellow card) 35'; Thornton 45+3'	Report	Corbin 8'; Bedoya 31'	Stadium: Cotton Bowl; Attendance: 3,446; Referee: Melinda Sopka Homa

November 3, 2024 10	DC Power FC	0–1	Carolina Ascent FC	Washington, D.C.
1:00 PM EST	Constant (yellow card) 45+1'	Report	Studer (yellow card) 12'; Guion 20' (pen.)	Stadium: Audi Field; Attendance: 1,467; Referee: Alyssa Nichols

November 9, 2024 11	Carolina Ascent FC	0–0	Spokane Zephyr FC	Charlotte, North Carolina
7:00 PM EST	Baisden (yellow card) 69'	Report		Stadium: American Legion Memorial Stadium; Attendance: 5,018; Referee: Eric Tattersall

November 16, 2024 12	Tampa Bay Sun FC	2–1	Carolina Ascent FC	Tampa, Florida
7:00 PM EST	Flint 22'; Giammona 44'; Edmonds (yellow card) 82'; Orkus (yellow card) 90+1'	Report	Baisden 35'; Studer (yellow card) 48'	Stadium: Riverfront Stadium; Attendance: 2,805; Referee: Gerald Flores

November 23, 2024 13	Carolina Ascent FC	0–1	Dallas Trinity FC	Charlotte, North Carolina
7:00 PM EST	Porter (yellow card) 14'; Bruce (yellow card) 59'	Report	Meza 3'; Broussard (yellow card) 85'	Stadium: American Legion Memorial Stadium; Attendance: 4,953; Referee: Shawn Tehini

December 14, 2024 14	Fort Lauderdale United FC	2–0	Carolina Ascent FC	Davie, Florida
	Locklear 54', 87'; Vaka (yellow card) 74'; Komani (yellow card) 90+2'	Report	Bruce (yellow card) 73'	Stadium: FTL UTD Stadium; Attendance: 2,078; Referee: Lorenzo Hernandez

February 15, 2025 15	Carolina Ascent FC	2–1	Lexington Sporting Club	Charlotte, North Carolina
7:00 PM EST	Perez 3' (o.g.); Corbin 35'; Bedoya (yellow card) 90+4'	Report	Cabezas (yellow card) 30'; Richardson 82'; Moyer (yellow card) 85'	Stadium: American Legion Memorial Stadium; Attendance: 1,817; Referee: Alexandra Billeter

February 23, 2025 16	Carolina Ascent FC	3–3	DC Power FC	Charlotte, North Carolina
3:00 PM EST	Merrick (yellow card) 27'; Troccoli 40'; Corbin 58'; Wolfbauer 62' (o.g.); Aguilera (yellow card) 77'; Bruce (yellow card) 88'; Baisden (yellow card) 89'	Report	Duong 27' (pen.); Kurosaki 53'; Gourley 83'	Stadium: American Legion Memorial Stadium; Attendance: 2,477; Referee: Adorae Monroy

March 2, 2025 17	Carolina Ascent FC	1–2	Fort Lauderdale United FC	Charlotte, North Carolina
3:00 PM EST	Porter (yellow card) 25'; Corbin 28'; Parker (yellow card) 65'; Merrick (yellow card) 89'	Report	Hamid 47'; Locklear 61'; Rajaee (yellow card) 62'; Baucom (yellow card) 82'; Vaka (yellow card) 87'	Stadium: American Legion Memorial Stadium; Attendance: 3,044; Referee: Laura Rodriguez

March 8, 2025 18	Spokane Zephyr FC	1–2	Carolina Ascent FC	Spokane, Washington
9:00 PM EST	Cook 85' (pen.)	Report	Hutchinson 5'; Butler 30'; Troccoli (yellow card) 56'; Porter (yellow card) 69'; Bruce (yellow card) 79'	Stadium: ONE Spokane Stadium; Attendance: 2,015; Referee: Iryna Petrunok

March 15, 2025 19	Tampa Bay Sun FC	1–0	Carolina Ascent FC	Tampa, Florida
7:00 PM EST	Flint 14' (yellow card) 44'; Moore (yellow card) 57'	Report	Serepca (yellow card) 43'	Stadium: Riverfront Stadium; Attendance: 2,401; Referee: Marie Durr

March 23, 2025 20	Lexington Sporting Club	0–4	Carolina Ascent FC	Lexington, Kentucky
4:00 PM EST	Yeong (yellow card) 48'	Report	Parker 2' (yellow card) 53'; Corbin 19'; Harding 26' 62'	Stadium: Lexington SC Stadium; Attendance: 693; Referee: Stephanie McFarland

March 29, 2025 21	Carolina Ascent FC	3–0	Dallas Trinity FC	Charlotte, North Carolina
7:00 PM EST	Hutchinson 19'; Corbin 24' 54' (pen.); Studer (yellow card) 57'	Report		Stadium: American Legion Memorial Stadium; Attendance: 3,045

April 8, 2025 22	DC Power FC	0–1	Carolina Ascent FC	Washington D.C.
7:30 PM EST	Bagley (yellow card) 65'; Yango (yellow card) 81'	Report	Troccoli (yellow card) 35' (goal) 59'	Stadium: Audi Field; Attendance: 353; Referee: Lauren Aldrich

April 12, 2025 23	Carolina Ascent FC	5–0	Brooklyn FC	Charlotte, North Carolina
4:00 PM EST	Butler 18'; Merrick 51'; Aguilera 65'; Harding 69'; Hylton 80'	Report	Grabias (yellow card) 59'	Stadium: American Legion Memorial Stadium; Attendance: 3,620; Referee: Edson Carvajal

April 19, 2025 24	Carolina Ascent FC	3–0	Spokane Zephyr FC	Charlotte, North Carolina
7:00 PM EST	Hutchinson 17', 69'; Materazzi 83'	Report	Murray (yellow card) 84'	Stadium: American Legion Memorial Stadium; Attendance: 2,565; Referee: Alejo Calume

April 26, 2025 25	Fort Lauderdale United FC	2–5	Carolina Ascent FC	Davie, Florida
7:30 PM EST	Hamid 3'; McCain 90+2'	Report	Corbin 5', 81' (pen.); Harding 17', 77' (yellow card) 45+1'; Troccoli 34'	Stadium: FTL UTD Stadium; Attendance: 2,215; Referee: Alex Beehler

May 17, 2025 26	Carolina Ascent FC	1–1	Tampa Bay Sun FC	Charlotte, North Carolina
7:00 PM EST	Hutchinson 2'; Murphy (yellow card) 63'; Studer (yellow card) 70'	Report	Fløe 2'; Haugen (yellow card) 45'	Stadium: American Legion Memorial Stadium; Attendance: 6,304; Referee: Joe Surgan

May 24, 2025 27	Brooklyn FC	0–0	Carolina Ascent FC	New York, New York
6:00 PM EST	Pluck (yellow card) 40'	Report	Troccoli (yellow card) 42'	Stadium: Maimonides Park; Attendance: 1,500; Referee: Adorae Monroy

May 31, 2025 28	Dallas Trinity FC	2–1	Carolina Ascent FC	Dallas, Texas
8:00 PM EST	Thornton 20'; Brooks (yellow card) 23'; Ubogagu 54'	Report	Parker (yellow card) 80'; Murphy (yellow card) 81'; Bedoya 90+3'; Porter (yellow card) 90+5'	Stadium: Cotton Bowl; Attendance: 5,884; Referee: Jaclyn Metz

=== Playoffs ===
June 8, 2025	Carolina Ascent FC	1–2 (a.e.t.)	Fort Lauderdale United FC	Charlotte, North Carolina
	González 55'	Report	Locklear 68', 120'	Stadium: American Legion Memorial Stadium; Attendance: 5,539; Referee: Alexandra Billeter

== Statistics ==
=== Appearances ===
As of match played 31 May 2025

Players with no appearances are not included on the list, italics indicate a loaned in player

No.	Nat.	Player	Regular Season		Playoffs		Total	
No.	Nat.	Player	Apps	Starts	Apps	Starts	Apps	Starts
Goalkeepers
1	(United States)	Megan McCelland	18	17	0	0	18	17
42	(United States)	Samantha Leshnak Murphy	11	11	0	0	11	11
Defenders
2	(United States)	Josie Studer	11	7	0	0	11	7
4	(United States)	Vicky Bruce	20	19	0	0	20	19
8	(United States)	Emily Moxley	5	0	0	0	5	0
12	(United States)	Sydney Studer	22	21	0	0	22	21
13	(United States)	Addisyn Merrick	19	19	0	0	19	19
20	(United States)	Jenna Butler	14	14	0	0	14	14
21	(United States)	Renée Guion	9	7	0	0	9	7
27	(United States)	Annika Creel	2	1	0	0	2	1
Midfielders
3	(United States)	Giovanna DeMarco	17	12	0	0	17	12
7	(Puerto Rico)	Jill Aguilera	27	26	0	0	27	26
14	(United States)	Taylor Porter	28	28	0	0	28	28
15	(Dominican Republic)	Kathrynn González	22	13	0	0	22	13
17	(Israel)	Eli Hutchinson	14	8	0	0	14	8
19	(United States)	Ashlynn Serepca	25	10	0	0	25	10
22	(England)	Chloe Hylton	13	1	0	0	13	1
25	(United States)	Sarah Troccoli	19	16	0	0	19	16
Forwards
5	(Ecuador)	Jaydah Bedoya	23	8	0	0	23	8
6	(United States)	Maria Tapia	2	0	0	0	2	0
9	(United States)	Mia Corbin	27	27	0	0	27	27
10	(United States)	Rylee Baisden	20	16	0	0	20	16
11	(United States)	Jaida McGrew	4	0	0	0	4	0
18	(United States)	Audrey Harding	20	18	0	0	20	18
23	(United States)	Riley Parker	13	13	0	0	13	13
70	(United States)	Stella Spitzer	2	0	0	0	2	0
Departed during season
24	(Nigeria)	Opeyemi Ajakaye	2	0	0	0	2	0

=== Goalscorers ===
Last updated 31 May 2025

Rank	Nat.	Player	Regular Season	Playoffs	Total
1	(United States)	Mia Corbin	12	0	12
2	(United States)	Audrey Harding	5	0	5
2	(Israel)	Eli Hutchinson	5	0	5
4	(United States)	Sarah Troccoli	3	0	3
5	(Ecuador)	Jaydah Bedoya	3	0	3
5	(United States)	Renée Guion	2	0	2
5	(United States)	Ashlynn Serepca	2	0	2
5	(Puerto Rico)	Jill Aguilera	2	0	2
5	(United States)	Jenna Butler	2	0	2
10	(United States)	Rylee Baisden	1	0	1
10	(United States)	Vicky Bruce	1	0	1
10	(United States)	Sydney Studer	1	0	1
10	(United States)	Riley Parker	1	0	1
10	(United States)	Addisyn Merrick	1	0	1
10	(England)	Chloe Hylton	1	0	1
Own Goals			3	0	3
Total			45	0	45

=== Assists ===
Last updated 31 May 2025

Rank	Nat.	Player	Regular Season	Playoffs	Total
1	(Puerto Rico)	Jill Aguilera	7	0	7
2	(United States)	Audrey Harding	5	0	5
3	(United States)	Taylor Porter	4	0	4
4	(United States)	Rylee Baisden	3	0	3
5	(United States)	Josie Studer	2	0	2
6	(Ecuador)	Jaydah Bedoya	1	0	1
6	(United States)	Vicky Bruce	1	0	1
6	(United States)	Addisyn Merrick	1	0	1
6	(United States)	Riley Parker	1	0	1
6	(Israel)	Eli Hutchinson	1	0	1
6	(United States)	Mia Corbin	1	0	1
6	(United States)	Riley Parker	1	0	1
6	(Dominican Republic)	Kathrynn González	1	0	1
Total			29	0	29

=== Clean sheets ===
Last updated 31 May 2025

Rank	Nat.	Player	Regular Season	Playoffs	Total
1	(United States)	Megan McCelland	6	0	6
1	(United States)	Samantha Leshnak Murphy	6	0	6
Total			12	0	12

=== Disciplinary record ===
As of final match played 31 May 2025
Player name(s) in italics transferred out mid-season.

Name	Regular Season		Playoffs		Total	
Name	Booked	Sent off (straight red)	Booked	Sent off (straight red)	Booked	Sent off (straight red)
(United States) Vicky Bruce	5	0	0	0	5	0
(United States) Sydney Studer	5	0	0	0	5	0
(United States) Giovanna DeMarco	4	0	0	0	4	0
(United States) Taylor Porter	4	0	0	0	4	0
(United States) Sarah Troccoli	3	0	0	3	3	0
(United States) Rylee Baisden	2	0	0	0	2	0
(United States) Mia Corbin	2	0	0	0	2	0
(United States) Ashlynn Serepca	2	0	0	0	2	0
(United States) Audrey Harding	2	0	0	0	2	0
(United States) Samantha Leshnak Murphy	2	0	0	0	2	0
(United States) Riley Parker	2	0	0	0	2	0
(Puerto Rico) Jill Aguilera	1	0	0	0	1	0
(Ecuador) Jaydah Bedoya	1	0	0	0	1	0
(United States) Renée Guion	1	0	0	0	1	0
(United States) Jaida McGrew	1	0	0	0	1	0
(United States) Addisyn Merrick	1	0	0	0	1	0
(United States) Josie Studer	1	0	0	0	1	0
(United States) Riley Parker	1	0	0	0	1	0
Total	36	0	0	0	36	0
