= Charlotte Burge =

American soccer player (born 2006)

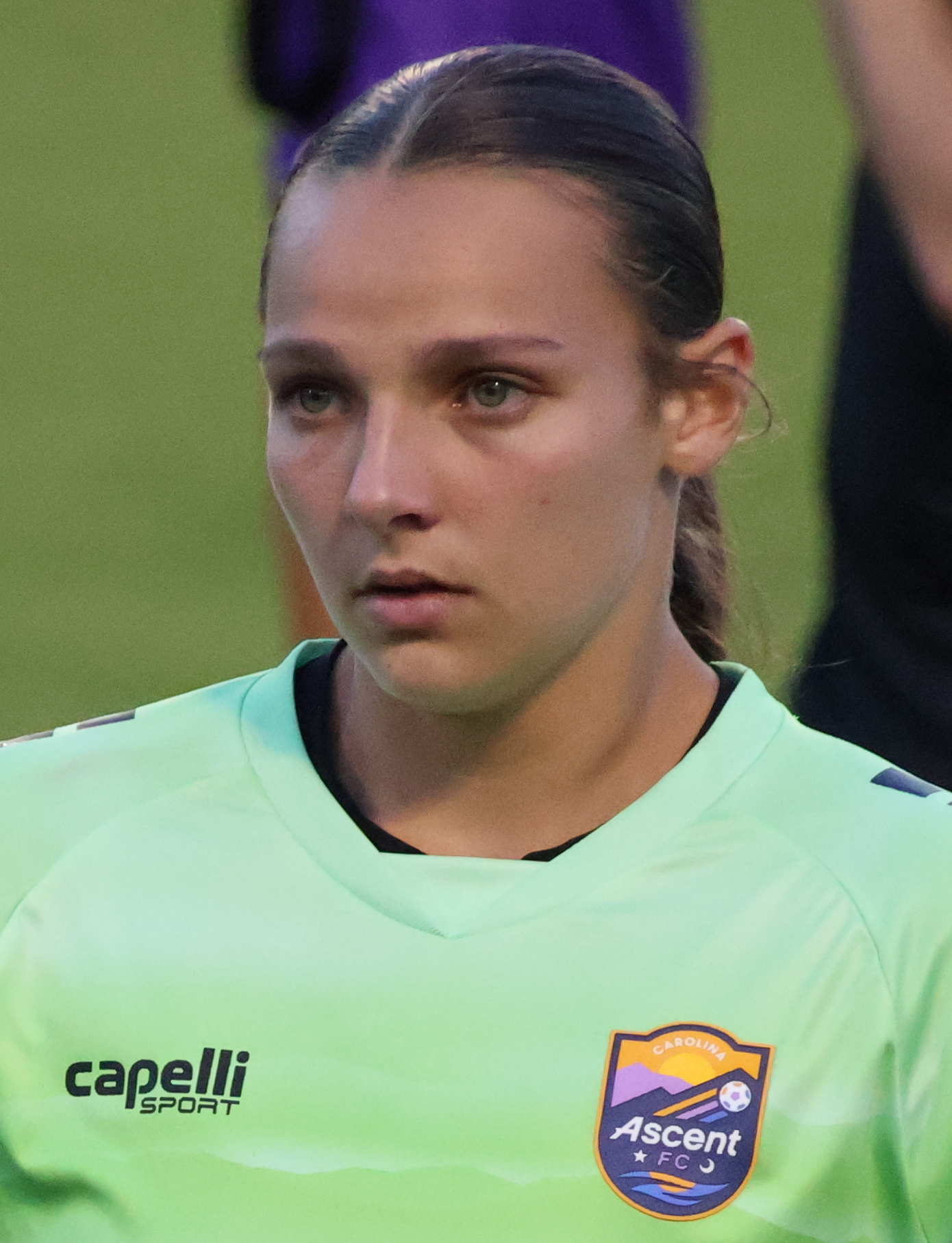
- Burge with the Carolina Ascent in 2025

Personal information
- Date of birth: April 4, 2006 (age 20)
- Height: 5 ft 8 in (1.73 m)
- Position: Goalkeeper

Youth career
- 2008–2023: Virginia Rush

Senior career*
Years	Team	Apps	(Gls)
2023	1. FFC Kaiserslautern		
2024–2026	Carolina Ascent	0	(0)
- * Club domestic league appearances and goals as of May 1, 2026

Charlotte Burge (born April 4, 2006) is an American professional soccer player who plays as a goalkeeper.

== Early life ==
Burge grew up in Virginia Beach, Virginia. She played for local youth club Virginia Rush for 15 years. She played high school soccer at First Colonial High School, leading the team to the VHSL Class 5 state championship as a freshman in 2021. In 2022, she finished her sophomore season as state runner-up and earned second-team all-state honors. She also spent several summers training with USL League Two club Virginia Beach United.

== Club career ==
Burge joined German club 1. FFC Kaiserslautern for three months in 2023, deciding she wanted to go pro and give up her college eligibility. In the 2024 preseason, she trained with expansion team Bay FC of the National Women's Soccer League (NWSL).

On June 27, 2024, Burge signed with the Carolina Ascent in the newly established USL Super League, becoming the youngest professional women's goalkeeper in the United States at age 18. She spent her rookie season as an unused backup behind Meagan McClelland and Samantha Leshnak Murphy as the Ascent won the inaugural Players' Shield. The following season, she was unused again as the third-stringer behind McClelland and Sydney Martinez.

== International career ==
Burge was called into training camps with the United States under-19 and under-20 teams in 2025.

== Honors ==
Carolina Ascent

- USL Super League Players' Shield: 2024–25
