= Ashlynn Serepca =

American soccer player (born 2000)

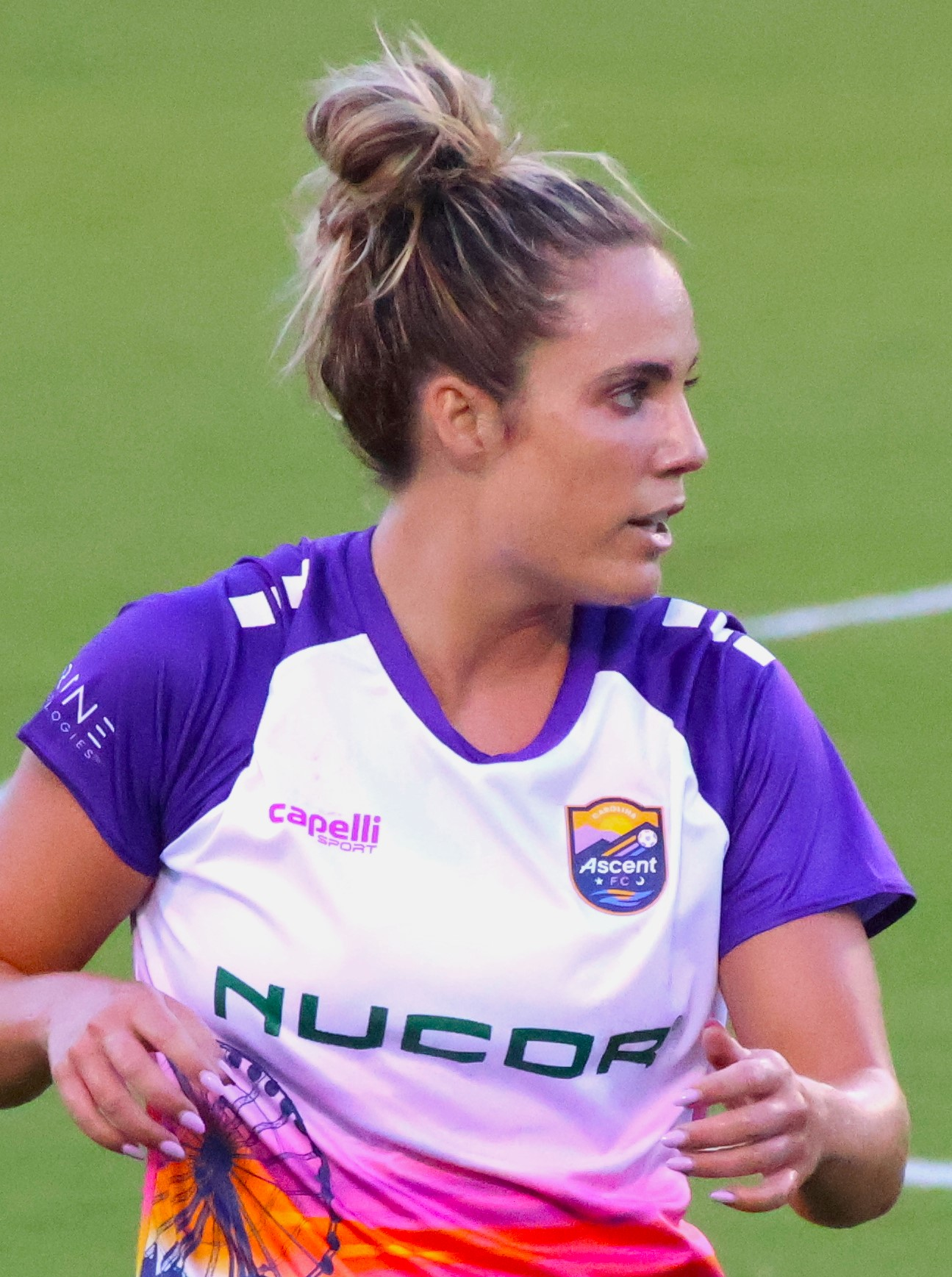
- Serepca with the Carolina Ascent in 2025

Personal information
- Full name: Ashlynn Nicole Serepca
- Date of birth: June 13, 2000 (age 26)
- Place of birth: Cornelius, North Carolina, United States
- Height: 1.65 m (5 ft 5 in)
- Position: Midfielder

Team information
- Current team: Linköping FC
- Number: 18

Youth career
- Carolina Rapids

College career
Years	Team	Apps	(Gls)
2018–2021	Virginia Cavaliers	63	(8)
2021–2022	Alabama Crimson Tide	49	(15)

Senior career*
Years	Team	Apps	(Gls)
2024	FC Pinzgau Saalfelden	12	(16)
2024–2025	Carolina Ascent	25	(2)
2026–	Linköping FC	0	(0)
- * Club domestic league appearances and goals as of January 15, 2026

Ashlynn Nicole Serepca (born June 13, 2000) is an American professional soccer player who plays as a midfielder for Elitettan club Linköping FC. She played college soccer for the Virginia Cavaliers and the Alabama Crimson Tide.

== Early life ==
Serepca was a two-time Gatorade Player of the Year in North Carolina and represented the United States at the U16, U17, and U18 levels. Additionally, Serepca was an Olympic Development Program (ODP) runner-up. Growing up in Cornelius, North Carolina, she played club soccer for the Carolina Rapids, where she helped her team reach the U.S. Club Soccer National Championships in 2016. The following year, she led her team to victory at the 2017 USYS National Championships.

== College career ==
=== Virginia Cavaliers ===
Serepca entered college as a highly touted recruit, ranked 10th nationally by TopDrawer Soccer. She committed to the University of Virginia, where she would play for three years. Serepeca appeared in nearly every game across her three seasons with the Cavaliers. In Serepca's freshmen year, she appeared in all 22 matches, scoring a goal and providing two assists, while earning ACC Academic Honor Roll honors. In her sophomore year, she had a standout year, where she played all 22 matches, scored seven goals—including two game-winners—and tallied 15 points. She also again made the ACC Academic Honor Roll.

=== Alabama Crimson Tide ===
Serepca transferred to the University of Alabama in 2021, joining a dominant team that included future professional players Reyna Reyes, Riley Tanner, and Riley Parker. Together, they helped Alabama reach its first-ever NCAA semifinal appearance in 2022.

Serepca ranks fourth all-time in career game-winning goals (7) for Alabama and set a new program record with six game-winners in the 2022 season, placing her second nationally and fifth in the SEC for that category. In 2022, she scored 10 goals—second-most on the team and fourth in the SEC—and contributed two assists for 22 points while netting three goals during the NCAA Tournament and starting all 27 games.

== Club career ==
Serepca went undrafted in the 2023 NWSL Draft. In February 2024, she joined Austrian side FC Pinzgau Saalfelden. She appeared in only 12 games but scored 16 goals in her time with the club.

Serepca joined the Carolina Ascent for the inaugural USL Super League season and played in the league's inaugural match against DC Power FC on August 17, 2024.

In January 2026, Serepca signed for Swedish side Linköping FC ahead of the club's first season since being relegated from the Damallsvenskan to the Elitettan. In the second match of the 2026 season, Serepca scored the game-winner against KIF Örebro DFF to help Linköping secure its first victory of the year.

== Personal life ==
Serepca graduated from the University of Virginia in 2021 with a Bachelor of Science degree in kinesiology and Exercise Science. She also graduated from the University of Alabama with an MBA in 2023.

== Career statistics ==
=== College ===
Team	Season	Regular season			Conference Tournament		NCAA Tournament		Total	
Team	Season	Division	Apps	Goals	Apps	Goals	Apps	Goals	Apps	Goals
Virginia Cavaliers	2018	ACC	18	1	2	0	3	0	22	1
Virginia Cavaliers	2019	ACC	18	7	3	0	2	0	22	7
Virginia Cavaliers	2020–21	ACC	12	0	2	0	5	0	19	0
Virginia Cavaliers	Total		48	8	7	0	10	0	63	8
Alabama Crimson Tide	2021	SEC	19	5	1	0	2	0	22	5
Alabama Crimson Tide	2022	SEC	19	6	3	1	5	3	27	10
Alabama Crimson Tide	Total		38	11	4	1	7	3	49	15
Total			86	19	11	1	17	3	112	23

=== Club ===
As of match played October 20, 2024

Appearances and goals by club, season, and competition
Club	Season	League			Playoffs		Total	
Club	Season	Division	Apps	Goals	Apps	Goals	Apps	Goals
FC Pinzgau Saalfelden	2023–24	ÖFB Frauen Bundesliga	12	16	—		12	16
Carolina Ascent FC	2024–25	USL Super League	8	2	0	0	8	2
Career total			20	18	0	0	20	18

== Honors ==
Carolina Ascent

- USL Super League Players' Shield: 2024–25
