= Renée Guion =

American soccer player (born 1999)

Personal information
- Full name: Renée Marie Guion
- Date of birth: October 2, 1999 (age 27)
- Place of birth: Houston, Texas, U.S.
- Height: 5 ft 8 in (1.73 m)
- Position: Defender

Youth career
- CESA

College career
Years	Team	Apps	(Gls)
2018–2021	Clemson Tigers	101	(4)

Senior career*
Years	Team	Apps	(Gls)
2022	FC Gintra		
2023–2024	Fortuna Hjørring	21	(4)
2024–2025	Carolina Ascent	9	(2)
- * Club domestic league appearances and goals

Renée Marie Guion (born October 2, 1999) is an American professional soccer player who plays as a defender. She played college soccer for the Clemson Tigers before starting her professional career with Lithuanian club FC Gintra, Danish club Fortuna Hjørring, and USL Super League club Carolina Ascent FC.

== Early life ==
Born in Houston, Texas, Guion grew up alongside three sisters and two brothers in Simpsonville, South Carolina. All five of her siblings participated in soccer, an activity Guion would first dabble in at the age of five. She went on to attend and play four years of varsity soccer at Mauldin High School, where she was a one-time all-state and three-time all-region honoree. In her last three years at Mauldin, Guion captained the program. She also played soccer for ECNL team CESA outside of school.

== College career ==
In her first season of college soccer with the Clemson Tigers, Guion was named the team's Newcomer of the Year after being the only member of Clemson's 2018 freshman group who played all 21 matches of the season. Guion would go on to appear in every single one of the Tigers' matches over the next three years, accumulating a sum of 101. On September 30, 2018, she recorded her first college goal contribution, assisting Mackenzie Smith in a 2–1 loss to Boston College. Guion's assist was far from her last in a Clemson jersey, as she soon demonstrated a knack for setting up her teammates. As a sophomore, she registered 12 assists, which ranked 10th in the nation. Four of her 12 assists came in an August 2019 match against Coastal Carolina.

Ahead of her junior season, Guion was named as one of three Clemson team captains. She went on to lead the Tigers to win 7 straight matches at Riggs Field and secure the program's first-ever perfect home record in history. As a senior, Guion tallied 13 assists, topping her previous record of 12 in 2019 and tying Clemson's program record. She rounded out her four years at Clemson with recognition on the All-ACC third team, her first (and only) career conference award.

== Club career ==
=== FC Gintra ===
Guion registered for the 2022 NWSL Draft but did not get selected by any team. She chose to continue her playing career by leaving the United States for the first time in her life and joining Lithuanian club FC Gintra on February 22, 2022. She scored her first professional goal four months later, contributing to a 6–0 victory in June 2022 over FK Banga. At the end of the season, Guion lifted her first two professional titles, as FC Gintra won the Lithuanian Women's A League and Women's Baltic Football League. Guion then went on to participate in Gintra's 2022–23 UEFA Women's Champions League qualification campaign. She appeared in the club's semi-final defeat, but sustained an injury and was not able to participate in the subsequent match. Gintra ended up losing by a slim margin to Polish club UKS SMS Łódź and consequently finished last place in their bracket.

=== Fortuna Hjørring ===
In February 2023, Guion signed for Fortuna Hjørring of the Danish Kvindeligaen. In doing so, she joined a large American contingent at the club that included future Carolina Ascent teammate Kelly Ann Livingstone. Guion made her Kvindeligaen debut on March 11, 2023 before going on to make 26 appearances for Hjørring across all competitions. On November 19, Guion scored a game-winning header goal in a 2–1 win over Brøndby IF that earned her Player of the Match honors. Upon the expiration of her one-year contract, Guion departed from the club.

=== Carolina Ascent ===
On July 4, 2024, Guion returned to her home turf of the Carolinas, signing a contract with Carolina Ascent FC ahead of the inaugural USL Super League season. In the Ascent's first-ever match, she started and set up the team's inaugural goal (which was also the first goal in the league) with a free kick service that eventually found its way to Vicky Bruce. Guion continued to showcase her skill from set-piece situations as the season progressed, scoring an Olimpico goal directly from a corner kick in September 2024 and converting from the penalty spot against DC Power FC in November. She made 9 league appearances (including 5 full 90-minute performances) in her sole season with the Ascent.

== Honors ==
FC Gintra

- Lithuanian Women's A League: 2022
- Women's Baltic Football League: 2022

Carolina Ascent FC

- USL Super League Players' Shield: 2024–25

Individual

- Third-team All-ACC: 2021
