= Emily Moxley =

American soccer player (born 2000)

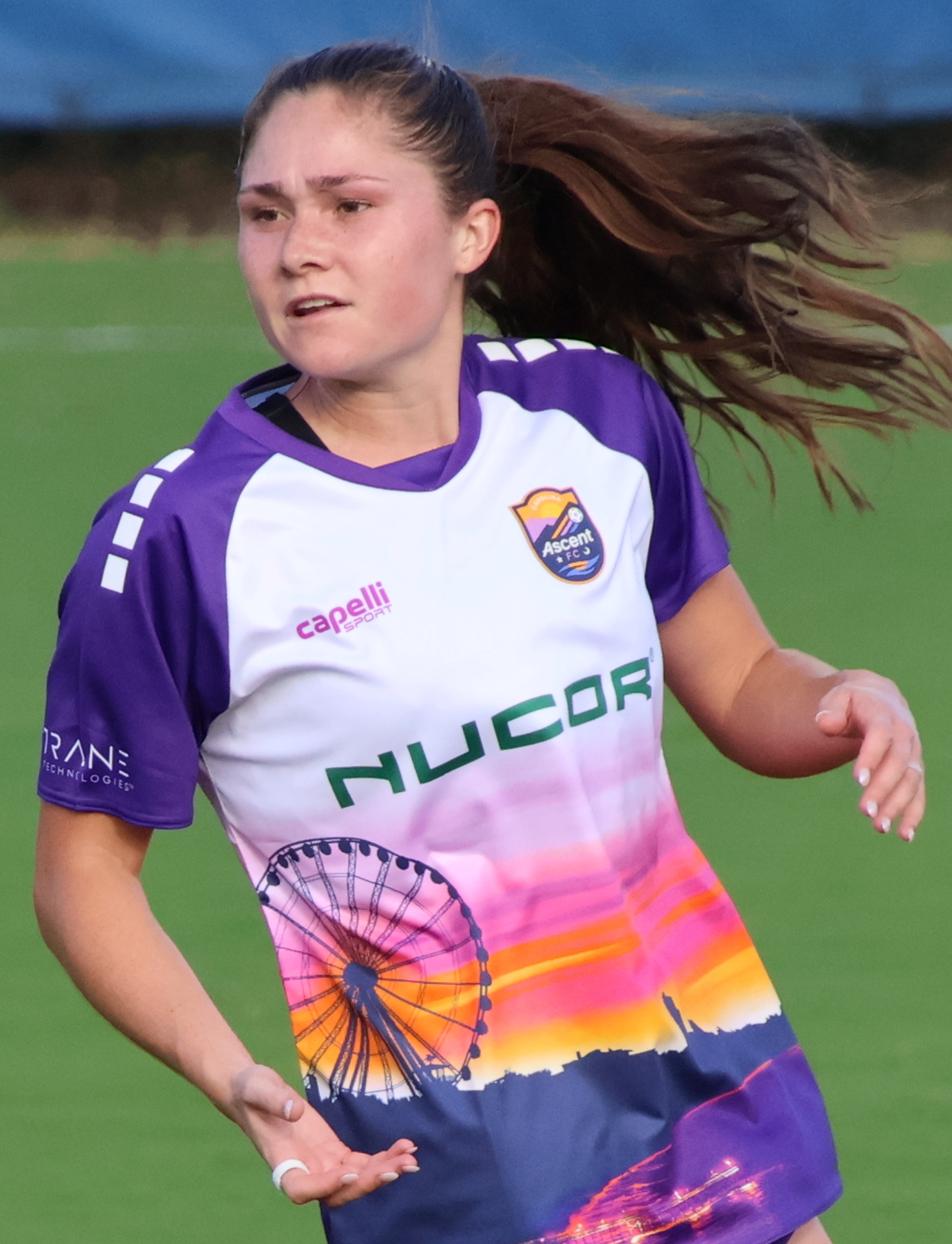
- Moxley with the Carolina Ascent in 2025

Personal information
- Full name: Emily Rose Moxley
- Date of birth: October 29, 2000 (age 26)
- Place of birth: Charlotte, North Carolina, U.S.
- Height: 5 ft 8 in (1.73 m)
- Position: Right back

Team information
- Current team: Carolina Ascent
- Number: 8

Youth career
- North Carolina Courage

College career
| Years | Team | Apps | (Gls) |
| 2019 | UNC Wilmington Seahawks | 17 | (5) |
| 2021–2023 | North Carolina Tar Heels | 67 | (0) |

Senior career*
| Years | Team | Apps | (Gls) |
| 2021 | Oak City United | – | (–) |
| 2024– | Carolina Ascent | 19 | (1) |
- * Club domestic league appearances and goals as of November 7, 2026

Emily Rose Moxley (born October 29, 2000) is an American professional soccer player who plays as a right back for USL Super League club Carolina Ascent. She played college soccer for the UNC Wilmington Seahawks and the North Carolina Tar Heels.

== Early life ==
Moxley was born in Charlotte, North Carolina, one of four children of Jennifer Moxley. She played two seasons of high school soccer for Panther Creek High School, earning all-region honors as a freshman and sophomore. She played club soccer for the NC Courage Academy.

== College career ==
Moxley featured at forward in her freshman season with the UNC Wilmington Seahawks in 2019. She scored twice in her first two games and was named Colonial Athletic Association (CAA) Offensive Player of the Week. She finished her freshman season with 5 goals and a team-best 8 assists in 17 games, earning conference all-rookie honors. She then transferred to the University of North Carolina at Chapel Hill but did not play soccer during the 2020 season, which was impacted by the COVID-19 pandemic. In the summer of 2021, she played for Raleigh–based Oak City United of the Women's Premier Soccer League (WPSL), earning all-conference honors.

Moxley began playing for the North Carolina Tar Heels as a junior in 2021. She started all 18 games as a defender or midfielder and led the team with 6 assists. In her senior season in 2022, she played in all 26 games, starting the last 20, and registered 8 assists, helping North Carolina to the Atlantic Coast Conference (ACC) regular-season title. In the ACC tournament, she scored the winning penalty in the semifinal shootout against Duke and assisted Avery Patterson's opener in the final loss to Florida State. She played every minute of the NCAA tournament, assisting Julia Dorsey's game winner against Florida State in the semifinals and assisting Patterson in the loss to UCLA in the title game. She started all 23 games and made 4 assists in her graduate season in 2023.

== Club career ==
Moxley was not selected in the 2024 NWSL Draft but was invited to train with the Orlando Pride in the 2024 preseason. On May 22, 2024, she signed with hometown club Carolina Ascent before the USL Super League's inaugural season. However, she missed much of her rookie season due to injury. On March 23, 2025, she made her professional debut in a 4–0 win over Lexington SC, entering the match as a late substitute for Addisyn Merrick. Carolina won the Players' Shield with the best record in the league.

On September 6, 2025, Moxley made her first professional start in a 2–2 draw with the Tampa Bay Sun, playing the full 90 minutes. On May 30, 2026, she appeared in the USL Super League final against Lexington SC, which the Ascent lost 3–1 in extra time.

On October 31, 2026, starting a match for the first time in more than a year, Moxley scored her first professional goal in a 1–0 victory over Lexington SC.

== Career statistics ==
=== Club summary ===
As of September 4, 2024

| Club | Season | League | | | Playoffs | | Total | |
| Club | Season | Division | Apps | Goals | Apps | Goals | Apps | Goals |
|---|---|---|---|---|---|---|---|---|
| Carolina Ascent | 2024–25 | USL Super League | 0 | 0 | 0 | 0 | 0 | 0 |
| Career total | | | 0 | 0 | 0 | 0 | 0 | 0 |

== Honors and awards ==
Carolina Ascent

- USL Super League Players' Shield: 2024–25

Individual

- ACC tournament all-tournament team: 2022
- CAA all-rookie team: 2019
