= Annika Creel =

American soccer player (born 1997)

Personal information
- Full name: Annika Mae Creel
- Birth name: Annika Mae Schmidt
- Date of birth: July 14, 1997 (age 29)
- Height: 5 ft 9 in (1.75 m)
- Position: Center back

Youth career
- Carmel United FC
- Indiana Fire Juniors

College career
Years	Team	Apps	(Gls)
2015–2016	UConn Huskies	15	(1)
2017–2019	Butler Bulldogs	55	(5)

Senior career*
Years	Team	Apps	(Gls)
2020	Göteborg FC	0	(0)
2020	→ Sunnanå SK (loan)	9	(1)
2021–2023	Houston Dash	0	(0)
2023	Indy Eleven	6	(0)
2023	NJ/NY Gotham FC	0	(0)
2024	Carolina Ascent (USLW)	2	(0)
2024–2025	Carolina Ascent	2	(0)

Managerial career
- 2023: Butler Bulldogs (assistant)
- * Club domestic league appearances and goals as of May 31, 2025

Annika Mae Creel (née Schmidt; born July 14, 1997) is an American professional soccer player who plays as a center back. She most recently played for USL Super League club Carolina Ascent. She played college soccer for the UConn Huskies and the Butler Bulldogs.

== Early life ==
A native of Zionsville, Indiana, Creel played youth club soccer for Carmel United FC and later, the Indiana Fire Juniors. She started playing with the Zionsville High School soccer team as a freshman defender and was a varsity starter across all four years, winning all-state honors twice along the way. In her senior season, Creel was a High School All-American and was crowned the MVP of the ensuing All-American game. She was also named the Zionsville captain and MVP in the same year.

== College career ==
=== UConn Huskies ===
Creel played two years with the UConn Huskies. She redshirted her freshman season due to an injury, but was able to return to the field in 2016. She scored her first collegiate goal on September 11, 2016, in a 4–1 victory over Stony Brook. In Creel's first start with the Huskies, she played 90 minutes and helped UConn secure its first AAC championship title in three years with a 1–0 win over Southern Methodist.

=== Butler Bulldogs ===
In 2017, Creel transferred to Butler University and became a three-year starter with the Butler Bulldogs. She made 55 career appearances, including all 20 of Butler's matches in 2018. Creel was named to the All-Big East team in each of her three seasons of play, and twice to the All-Region first team. She won multiple academic honors with the Bulldogs, including a spot in the 2019 Academic All-American third team. She also scored 5 goals in her time with Butler.

== Club career ==
=== Göteborg FC ===
Creel registered for the 2020 NWSL College Draft, but was ultimately not selected. She trained throughout NWSL preseason with the Houston Dash before making a move overseas and signing a multi-year contract with Swedish club Göteborg FC on June 12, 2020. Despite starting Göteborg center back Beata Kollmats sustaining a serious ACL injury, Creel had trouble competing for minutes and faced injury troubles of her own. She did not make any Damallsvenskan appearances with Göteborg before being loaned out.

==== Sunnanå SK (loan) ====
On August 14, 2020, Creel was loaned out to Swedish second-tier club Sunnanå SK, who were last place in the Elitettan standings and had failed to pick up any points over the first 10 games of the season. Creel played in 9 games and scored 1 goal with Sunnanå before her loan expired.

=== Houston Dash ===
On January 29, 2021, the Houston Dash signed Creel, who had trained with the team a year before, to a one-year contract with a club option. Despite having her contract option exercised at the end of the season, Creel had difficulty earning playing time and picked up a season-ending ACL and meniscus injury in mid-2022. During her time rehabbing her knee, Creel shifted into a more supportive role on the team and spent time motivating her teammates behind the scenes. She was re-signed once more, in January 2023, before being waived five months later. In her three seasons at Houston, Creel did not make a single appearance.

=== Indy Eleven ===
In 2023, Creel spent a season playing with the Indy Eleven of the pre-professional USL W League. She played in 6 matches, registered 2 assists, and was part of an Indy Eleven backline that recorded 10 shutouts throughout the campaign. Creel and her teammates eventually went on to win the USL W League Championship title.

=== NJ/NY Gotham FC ===
Following her season at Indy Eleven, Creel returned to the NWSL. She signed a national team replacement player contract with NJ/NY Gotham FC on July 27, 2023, filling in a roster missing six players who were participating in the 2023 FIFA Women's World Cup. She did not log any appearances with Gotham FC before her short-term contract expired.

=== Carolina Ascent ===
On July 3, 2024, Creel signed a contract with Carolina Ascent FC of the USL Super League. She was a starter in the inaugural USLS match, which was a 1–0 victory over DC Power FC on August 17. During the match, Creel was directly involved in the play that resulted in Vicky Bruce's game-winner (which was also the first goal in league history). She made one more appearance with Carolina before departing from the club at the end of the season.

== Coaching career ==
Directly after her stint at NJ/NY Gotham FC, Creel joined her former college team, the Butler Bulldogs, as an assistant coach. During Creel's season as a member of the Butler coaching staff, the team made it to the first round of the Big East tournament, where they were knocked out by Creel's other former team, the UConn Huskies.

== Personal life ==
She married Tanner Creel in January 2023. The couple met at a Christian group at the University of Connecticut and announced their engagement in December 2021.

== Honors ==
Carolina Ascent

- USL Super League Players' Shield: 2024–25

Indy Eleven

- USL W League Championship: 2023
