= Cannon School =

Prep school in Concord, North Carolina, US

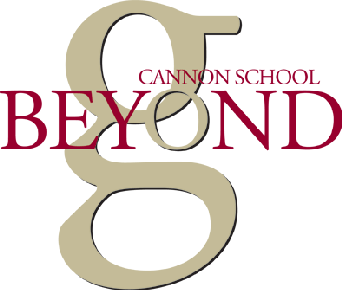

Location
- 5801 Poplar Tent Road; Concord, North Carolina 28027; United States; 35°24′32″N 80°40′25″W

Information
- Former name: Cabarrus Academy (1969–1998)
- Type: Private
- Motto: Go Beyond
- Established: 1969 (57 years ago)
- CEEB code: 340879
- NCES School ID: 01012842
- Headmaster: Michael Drew
- Faculty: 97.6
- Enrollment: 1,045 (2024)
- Colors: Maroon and gold
- Athletics: North Carolina Independent Schools Athletic Association (NCISAA)
- Mascot: Cougar
- Website: cannonschool.org

Cannon School is an independent, nonsectarian, college preparatory institution serving students in junior kindergarten through grade 12. Cannon School is located in Concord, North Carolina in Cabarrus County, on a 65-acre (26 ha) campus on Poplar Tent Road near the Cabarrus–Mecklenburg county line.

== History ==
Cannon School was founded in 1969 as a segregation academy named Cabarrus Academy, immediately following court rulings mandating the desegregation of North Carolina public schools.

The school was located in the historic downtown Concord residence of local textile entrepreneur James William Cannon. The school initially served students in grades 1-10. Upon opening, the school had 75 all white students, but neither a cafeteria nor a gymnasium. Tuition was $750. Headmaster Herman Butrick claimed that black students would have been admitted, but none had applied. In 1970, the IRS found that the school had a non-discriminatory admissions policy and was thus eligible for tax-exempt status.

In 1994, the school relocated to its current 65-acre (26 ha) campus in the northwestern corner of Cabarrus County. In 1998, Cabarrus Academy was renamed Cannon School.

The school enrolled approximately 1,045 students for the 2024–2025 school year.

== Academics ==
Cannon School is fully accredited by the Southern Association of Colleges and Schools and the Southern Association of Independent Schools.

The school offers Mandarin Chinese classes in the Middle School and Upper School. Cannon School has developed a sister school exchange program with Tianli International School of Luzhou, Sichuan, China. Each year, since 2004, local families host Chinese students and teachers in their homes during week-long visits to Cannon School and other points of interest around the Carolinas.

== Notable alumni ==
- Jaden Bradley — Point Guard for the Toronto Raptors
- Vicky Bruce — professional women's soccer player
- Harrison Burton — NASCAR Cup Series driver for Wood Brothers Racing
- Austin Cindric — NASCAR Cup Series driver for Team Penske, 2022 Daytona 500 winner, and 2020 NASCAR Xfinity Series champion
- Jarell Eddie — professional basketball player
- Carter Faith — country music artist
