= Sarah Troccoli =

American soccer player (born 1996)

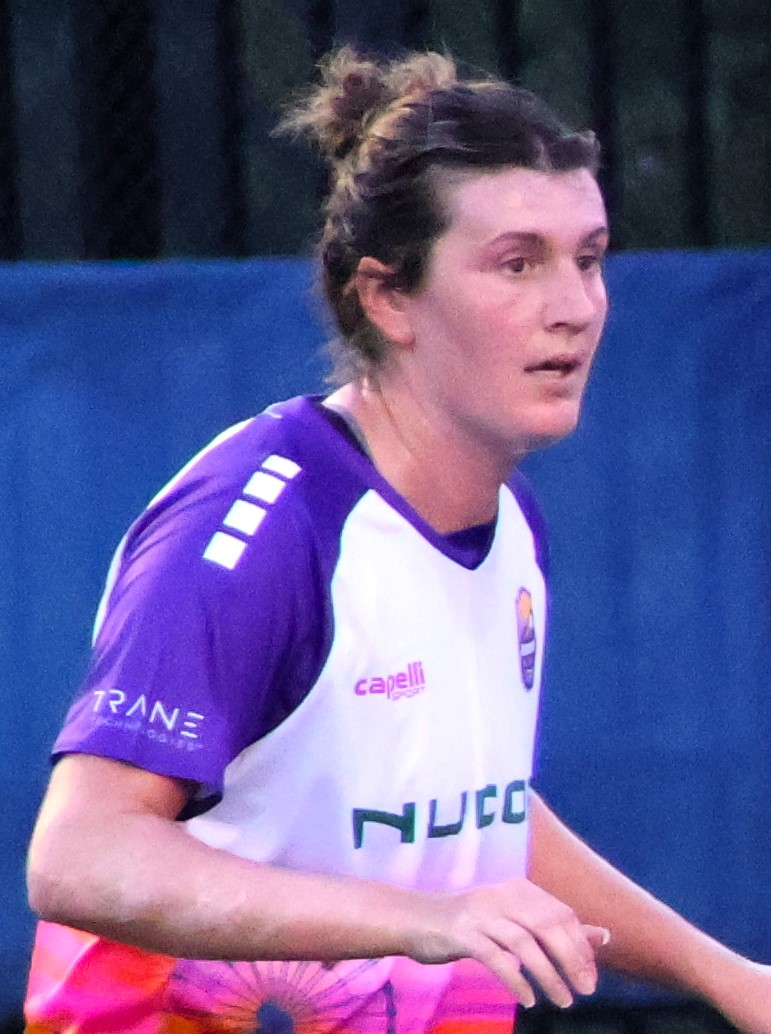
- Troccoli with the Carolina Ascent in 2025

Personal information
- Full name: Sarah Mary Troccoli
- Date of birth: November 15, 1996 (age 30)
- Place of birth: Troy, Michigan, United States
- Height: 5 ft 11 in (1.80 m)
- Position: Midfielder

College career
Years	Team	Apps	(Gls)
2015–2018	Florida Gators	90	(13)

Senior career*
Years	Team	Apps	(Gls)
2021–2023	Åland United	46	(12)
2024–2026	Carolina Ascent	23	(3)
- * Club domestic league appearances and goals as of 17:29, June 4, 2026 (UTC)

Sarah Mary Troccoli (born November 15, 1996) is an American professional soccer player who plays as a midfielder. She played college soccer for the Florida Gators.

== Club career ==
=== Åland United ===
Troccoli played for Åland United of the Kansallinen Liiga for three years. In the 2021 season, Troccoli played 19 games and scored 6 goals. In the 2022 season she played 20 games and scored 4 goals and finished off the season winning the Finnish Cup.

=== Carolina Ascent ===
On July 2, 2024, Troccoli signed with Carolina Ascent FC ahead of the USL Super League's inaugural season. She scored her first goal with the club in a 3–3 draw with DC Power FC on February 23, 2025.

== Honors ==
Åland United

- Finnish Women's Cup: 2021, 2022

Carolina Ascent

- USL Super League Players' Shield: 2024–25
