= Audrey Coleman =

American soccer player (born 1998)

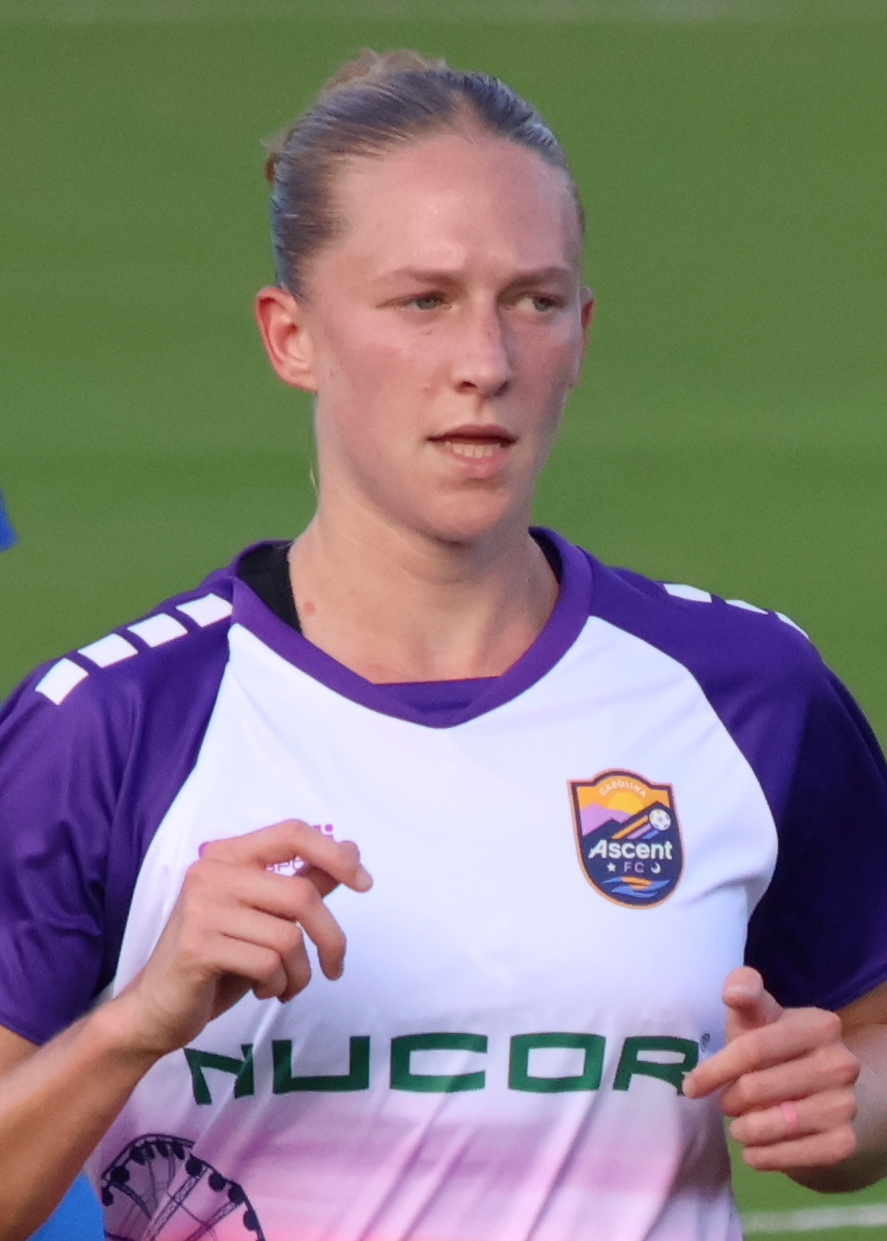
- Harding with the Carolina Ascent in 2025

Personal information
- Birth name: Audrey Rose Harding
- Date of birth: July 14, 1998 (age 28)
- Place of birth: Akron, Ohio, U.S.
- Height: 5 ft 10 in (1.78 m)
- Position: Forward

Team information
- Current team: Carolina Ascent
- Number: 18

Youth career
- Ohio Premiere

College career
Years	Team	Apps	(Gls)
2017–2021	UNC Wilmington Seahawks	68	(23)

Senior career*
Years	Team	Apps	(Gls)
2022	Washington Spirit	9	(0)
2023	KIF Örebro DFF	25	(2)
2024	Carolina Ascent (USLW)	9	(5)
2024–	Carolina Ascent	46	(7)
- * Club domestic league appearances and goals as of 17:24, June 4, 2026 (UTC)

Audrey Rose Coleman (née Harding; born July 14, 1998) is an American professional soccer player who plays as a forward for USL Super League club Carolina Ascent. She played college soccer for the UNC Wilmington Seahawks. She has previously played for the Washington Spirit of the National Women's Soccer League (NWSL) and KIF Örebro in Sweden.

== Early life ==
Coleman was born in Akron, Ohio, as one of five children from Greg and Dena Harding. She attended Revere High School, where she recorded 58 goals and 31 assists for the program. While at Revere, Coleman was a three-time All-State and All-District selection. She was also a member of the school's track and field team in her freshman year. Coleman played youth soccer for Ohio Premiere and made triweekly trips to Columbus to link up with the team.

== College career ==
Coleman played for the UNC Wilmington Seahawks from 2017 to 2021. In her freshman year, she played in 12 matches. She played as a reserve in her sophomore season but still managed to score her first collegiate goal on August 24, 2018, in a defeat to Virginia Tech. Coleman increased in production during her subsequent seasons as a Seahawk, earning an All-CAA second team spot in 2019 and getting first team conference honors in her last two seasons. As a senior, she helped the team to a CAA final, tallying a goal in their semifinal win over Northeastern.

In her last year at UNC Wilmington, Coleman recorded season-high numbers in goals, assists, and starts. she became the 10th player in program history to score 20 or more goals; she would later score three more to take the total tally up to 23. She also became the first Seahawk to receive United Soccer Coaches Scholar All-America recognition. Coleman departed from UNC Wilmington with 68 games and 23 goals recorded.

== Club career ==
=== Washington Spirit ===
On December 18, 2021, Coleman was selected in the third round of the 2022 NWSL Draft by the Washington Spirit. As the 38th overall pick, Coleman also became the second-ever UNC Wilmington player to be drafted into the NWSL. While she was part of the Spirit's preseason roster, Coleman was not signed before the start of the season. Instead, she inked her first professional contract on May 1, 2022, as a short-term injury replacement for Gaby Vincent.

Coleman made her Spirit debut later that day, in a 2–1 victory over the OL Reign. She was part of the Spirit's run to the 2022 NWSL Challenge Cup final and entered the championship match as a substitute for the injured Jordan Baggett. On May 27, she earned her first professional start and recorded her first professional assist in a 2–2 draw with the Orlando Pride. After her short-term contract expired, Coleman was re-signed to the Spirit's active roster through the end of the 2022 season. At the conclusion of the year, the Spirit did not renew Coleman's contract as part of the club's end-of-year roster decisions.

=== KIF Örebro DFF ===
Coleman signed a contract with Swedish club KIF Örebro DFF in the in December 2022. She played in 25 matches and scored twice as Örebro finished in 10th place overall in the Damallsvenskan. After one season with Örebro, Coleman departed from the club as part of a mutual agreement.

=== Carolina Ascent ===
On July 2, 2024, Coleman signed a contract with USL Super League team Carolina Ascent FC ahead of the club's inaugural season. She played in the team's inaugural game, a 1–0 victory over Lexington SC. During the match, Coleman registered the first ever assist in league history. On March 23, 2025, Coleman scored twice in a 4–0 victory over Lexington SC, getting her name on the scoresheet for the first time with the Ascent. She scored another goal and racked up 3 assists within the remainder of March, winning herself a spot on the USL Super League Team of the Month.

Coleman started her second season with Carolina on a good note, forcing an own goal from opposing defender Sh'Nia Gordon in stoppage time of the Ascent's season-opener to salvage a 2–2 draw with Fort Lauderdale United FC. She was named the Super League's October Player of the Month after scoring one goal and registering 3 assists across four matches.

== Personal life ==
She is married to Ethan Coleman. The couple got engaged on October 12, 2024.

== Career statistics ==
=== Club ===
As of March 23, 2025

Appearances and goals by club, season and competition
Club	Season	League			Cup (Note: Includes the NWSL Challenge Cup and Svenska Cupen)		Playoffs (Note: Includes NWSL Playoffs)		Total	
Club	Season	Division	Apps	Goals	Apps	Goals	Apps	Goals	Apps	Goals
Washington Spirit	2022	NWSL	9	0	1	0	—		10	0
KIF Örebro DFF	2023	Damallsvenskan	25	2	3	1	—		28	3
Carolina Ascent FC	2024–25	USL Super League	12	2	—		—		12	2
Career total			46	4	4	1	0	0	50	5

== Honors ==
Carolina Ascent

- USL Super League Players' Shield: 2024–25
