= Jill Aguilera =

Puerto Rican footballer (born 1998)

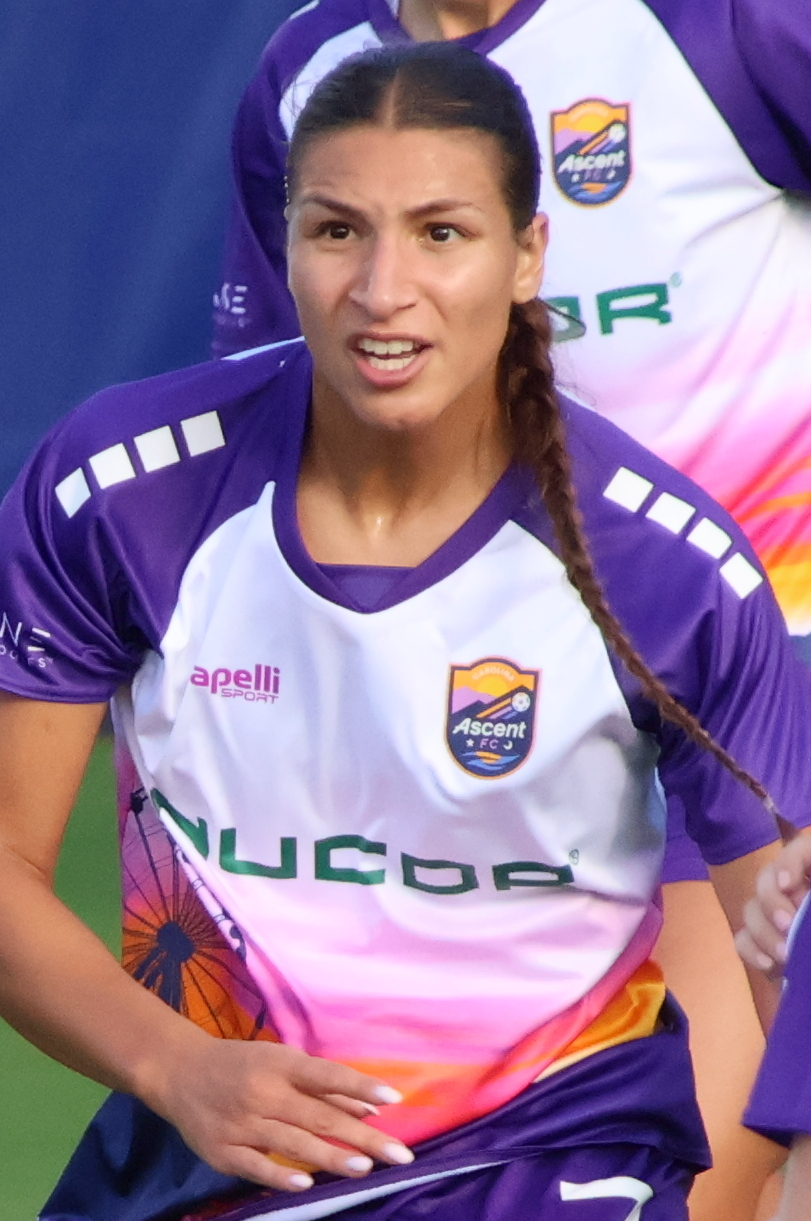
- Aguilera with the Carolina Ascent in 2025

Personal information
- Full name: Jillienne Cole Aguilera
- Date of birth: January 5, 1998 (age 28)
- Place of birth: Redwood City, California, U.S.
- Height: 1.70 m (5 ft 7 in)
- Position: Left back

Team information
- Current team: Carolina Ascent
- Number: 7

Youth career
- 2013–2016: Woodside Wildcats

College career
Years	Team	Apps	(Gls)
2016–2021	Arizona Wildcats	92	(33)

Senior career*
Years	Team	Apps	(Gls)
2022–2023	Chicago Red Stars	28	(0)
2024–	Carolina Ascent	55	(6)
2024	→ Washington Spirit (loan)	0	(0)

International career^{‡}
2022–	Puerto Rico	9	(3)
- * Club domestic league appearances and goals as of June 4, 2026 ‡ National team caps and goals as of December 1, 2023

Jillienne Cole Aguilera (born January 5, 1998) is a professional footballer who plays as a left back for USL Super League club Carolina Ascent. Born in the United States, she plays for the Puerto Rico national team. She played college soccer for the Arizona Wildcats.

== Early life ==
Aguilera played varsity soccer for Woodside High School. She holds the goal scoring record at 105 goals.

== College career ==
Aguilera played soccer for the women's team of University of Arizona from 2017 to 2021. While Aguilera started at University of Arizona in Fall 2016, a knee injury before the start of the season sidelined her for the year. She holds the University of Arizona record for games played at 92 and goals scored at 33.

== Club career ==
Aguilera started her career in 2022 with American side Chicago Red Stars. The Red Stars released Aguilera on March 11, 2024.

On May 14, 2024, Aguilera signed with USL Super League club Carolina Ascent.

On July 27, 2024, Aguilera joined the Washington Spirit on a short-term loan for the remainder of the 2024 NWSL x Liga MX Femenil Summer Cup.

== International career ==
In April 2022, Aguilera received her first call-up to Puerto Rico's Women's National Team and has continued to represent Puerto Rico since.

During the 2024 CONCACAF W Gold Cup’s preliminary matches, Aguilera scored the match-winning goal in Puerto Rico’s match against higher-seed Haiti, helping Puerto Rico advance to the W Gold Cup tournament. By qualifying for the tournament, Puerto Rico’s Blue Hurricanes made history as the first time the national team has made a Concacaf qualifying tournament.

In the group stage match against Panama, Aguilera took a corner kick and served the ball to Madison Cox, who scored the equalizer. Puerto Rico would go on to win the match 2-0.

== Career statistics ==
=== Club ===
As of September 4, 2024

Appearances and goals by club, season and competition
Club	Season	League			Cup (Note: Includes the NWSL Challenge Cup)		Playoffs (Note: Includes NWSL Playoffs)		NWSL x Liga MX Femenil Summer Cup		Total	
Club	Season	Division	Apps	Goals	Apps	Goals	Apps	Goals	Apps	Goals	Apps	Goals
Chicago Red Stars	2022	NWSL	17	0	3	0	1	0	—		21	0
Chicago Red Stars	2023	NWSL	11	0	4	0	—		—		15	0
Chicago Red Stars	2024	NWSL	0	0	0	0	—		—		0	0
Carolina Ascent	2024–25	USL Super League	11	1	0	0	0	0	—		11	0
Washington Spirit (loan)	2024	NWSL	—		—		—		1	0	1	0
Career total			39	1	7	0	1	0	1	0	48	0

=== International goals ===
No.	Date	Venue	Opponent	Score	Result	Competition
1.	8 April 2022	Estadio Centroamericano, Mayagüez, Puerto Rico	Suriname	2–0	2–0	2022 CONCACAF W Championship qualification
2.	1 July 2023	Estadio Las Delicias, Santa Tecla, El Salvador	Jamaica	1–0	1–1	2023 Central American and Caribbean Games
3.	27 October 2023	Hasely Crawford Stadium, Port of Spain, Trinidad and Tobago	Trinidad and Tobago	2–1	2–1	2024 CONCACAF W Gold Cup qualification
4.	17 February 2024	Dignity Health Sports Park, Carson, United States	Haiti	1–0	1–0	2024 CONCACAF W Gold Cup qualification
5.	3 April 2024	Mayagüez Athletics Stadium, Mayagüez, Puerto Rico	Cayman Islands	8–0	12–0	Friendly
6.	6 April 2024	Parque de Fútbol Benjamín Martínez González, San Juan, Puerto Rico	Cayman Islands	5–0	8–0	Friendly
7.	1 December 2025	Estadio Juan Ramón Loubriel, Bayamón, Puerto Rico	Saint Lucia	1–0	7–0	2026 CONCACAF W Championship qualification
8.	1 December 2025	Estadio Juan Ramón Loubriel, Bayamón, Puerto Rico	Saint Lucia	4–0	7–0	2026 CONCACAF W Championship qualification
9.	1 December 2025	Estadio Juan Ramón Loubriel, Bayamón, Puerto Rico	Saint Lucia	6–0	7–0	2026 CONCACAF W Championship qualification
10.	1 December 2025	Estadio Juan Ramón Loubriel, Bayamón, Puerto Rico	Saint Lucia	7–0	7–0	2026 CONCACAF W Championship qualification
11.	27 February 2026	Estadio Juan Ramón Loubriel, Bayamón, Puerto Rico	Saint Vincent and the Grenadines	2–0	10–0	2026 CONCACAF W Championship qualification
12.	27 February 2026	Estadio Juan Ramón Loubriel, Bayamón, Puerto Rico	Saint Vincent and the Grenadines	9–0	10–0	2026 CONCACAF W Championship qualification
13.	27 February 2026	Estadio Juan Ramón Loubriel, Bayamón, Puerto Rico	Saint Vincent and the Grenadines	10–0	10–0	2026 CONCACAF W Championship qualification
14.	5 March 2026	Bethlehem Soccer Stadium, St. Croix, U.S. Virgin Islands	U.S. Virgin Islands	1–0	9–0	2026 CONCACAF W Championship qualification
15.	5 March 2026	Bethlehem Soccer Stadium, St. Croix, U.S. Virgin Islands	U.S. Virgin Islands	7–0	9–0	2026 CONCACAF W Championship qualification

== Honors ==
Carolina Ascent

- USL Super League Players' Shield: 2024–25

Individual

- USL Super League Defender of the Year: 2024–25
- USL Super League Golden Playmaker: 2024–25
- USL Super League All-League First Team: 2024–25, 2025–26
- Second-team All-Pac-12: 2020, 2021
