= Jaida McGrew =

American soccer player (born 2007)

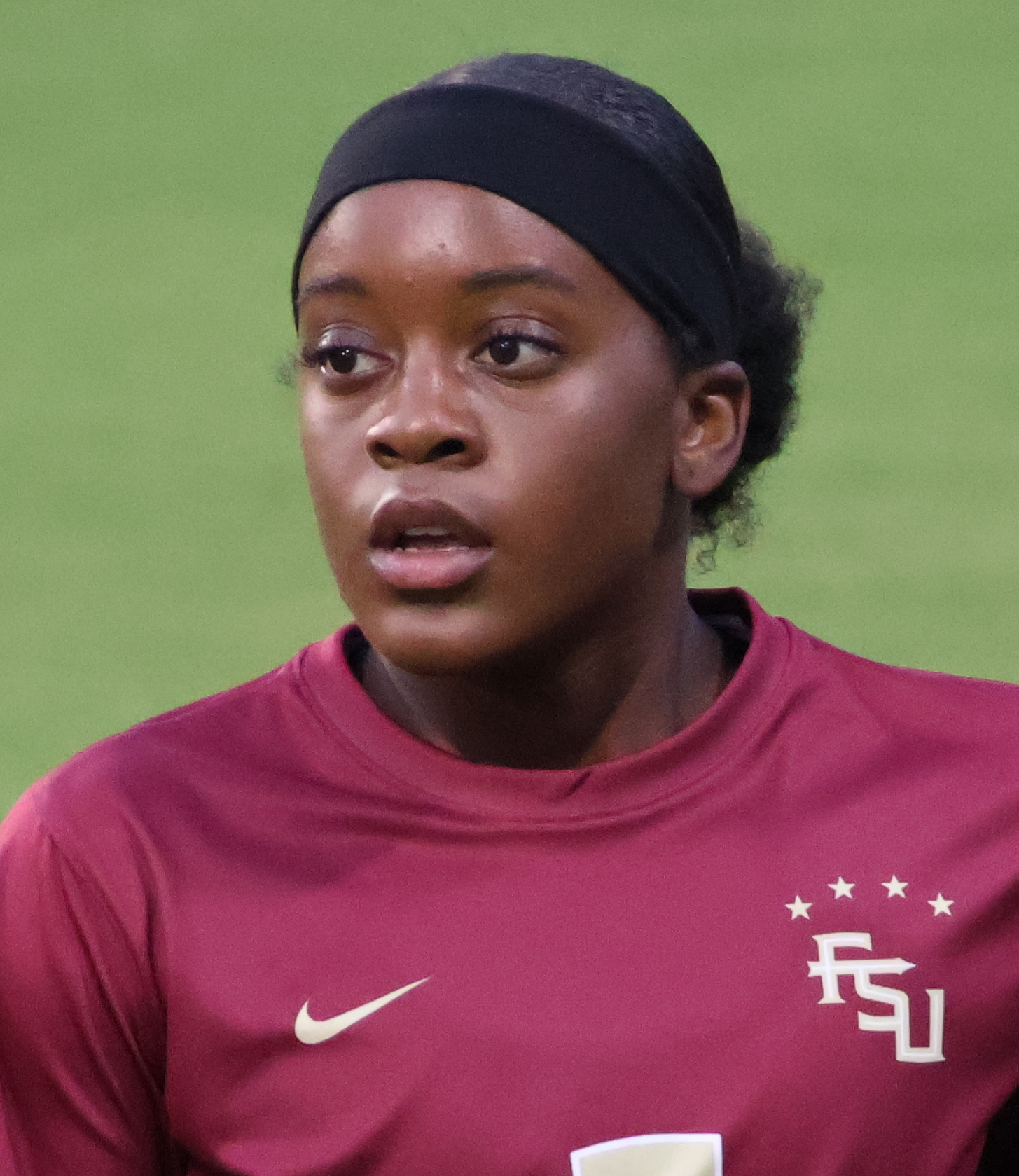
- McGrew with Florida State in 2025

Personal information
- Date of birth: June 3, 2007 (age 19)
- Height: 5 ft 7 in (1.70 m)
- Positions: Forward; defender

Team information
- Current team: Florida State Seminoles
- Number: 3

Youth career
- Charlotte Soccer Academy

College career
Years	Team	Apps	(Gls)
2025–	Florida State Seminoles	21	(1)

Senior career*
Years	Team	Apps	(Gls)
2024	Carolina Ascent (USLW)	7	(4)
2024	Carolina Ascent	4	(0)

International career
2026–	United States U19		
- * Club domestic league appearances and goals as of 02:39, June 13, 2026 (UTC)

Jaida McGrew (born June 3, 2007) is an American college soccer player who plays as a forward or defender for the Florida State Seminoles. She has previously played for USL Super League club Carolina Ascent FC. In 2025, she won the NCAA national championship with the Seminoles.

== Early life ==
McGrew grew up in Stanley, North Carolina. She eventually began playing club soccer in Charlotte for the Charlotte Soccer Academy, earning three Elite Clubs National League (ECNL) all-conference honors. In 2023, she led Charlotte to the ECNL finals and was named an ECNL All-American after recording 5 goals and 4 assists across 6 playoff matches.

McGrew spent her freshman and sophomore years of high school at Mountain Island Charter School. She tallied 73 goals and 19 assists across her Mountain Island career, with 57 of her goals coming in her sophomore year. A multi-sport athlete, she also won multiple state championships in track. Ahead of her junior year, McGrew transferred to Providence Day School in Charlotte. She made an immediate impact in her first year at Providence, lifting the team to an NCISAA state title. Despite spraining her ankle in the state semifinals, she fought through the injury in the championship match, scoring all three goals in a 3–1 victory over the Charlotte Latin School. McGrew did not return to Providence for a senior year, instead opting to join a homeschool program in the fall in a quest to graduate early.

=== Carolina Ascent ===
In February 2024, Carolina Ascent FC reached out to McGrew. Three months later, McGrew took to the field for the Ascent's pre-professional USL W League team. She scored 4 goals and registered 1 assist across 7 matches in the 2024 season.

McGrew then received an invitation to train with Carolina's professional team ahead of the inaugural USL Super League campaign. On July 5, 2024, the Ascent announced that they had signed McGrew on an academy contract (allowing her to retain college eligibility), alongside fellow youngster Isabella Franco. McGrew made her professional debut on September 6, 2024, coming on as a late-game substitute in a 2–1 win over Fort Lauderdale United FC. After completing her senior year of high school, McGrew departed from the Ascent ahead of the second half of the Super League season in order to join the Florida State Seminoles early. She had made 4 appearances for the club.

== College career ==
In her first season playing college soccer for the Florida State Seminoles, McGrew was a rotational player, starting in 8 of her 21 appearances. She scored her first collegiate goal on November 23, 2025, netting in the Seminoles' NCAA tournament third round victory over Georgetown. In the national championship match, against top-ranked Stanford, McGrew was called on to play 40 minutes as Florida State claimed the NCAA title.

== International career ==
McGrew earned call-ups to the United States under-17 national team in 2024, but did not make the squad that participated in that year's edition of the FIFA U-17 Women's World Cup. She then moved up an age group to the U19s in 2026.

== Honors ==
Florida State Seminoles

- NCAA Division I women's soccer tournament: 2025
