= Eli Hutchinson =

American-born Israeli soccer player (born 1996)

Eli Hutchinson אליאנה האצ'ינסון
Personal information
- Birth name: Elianna Esther Anna Beard
- Date of birth: May 23, 1996 (age 30)
- Place of birth: Portland, Oregon, United States
- Height: 5 ft 4 in (1.63 m)
- Position: Midfielder

College career
| Years | Team | Apps | (Gls) |
| 2014–2017 | Marquette Golden Eagles | 66 | (7) |

Senior career*
| Years | Team | Apps | (Gls) |
| 2018 | BIIK Kazygurt | | |
| 2018–2020 | Maccabi Holon | | |
| 2020–2021 | Ramat HaSharon | | |
| 2021 | Grindavík | | |
| 2021–2023 | Kiryat Gat | 12 | (4) |
| 2024 | Keflavík | 8 | (0) |
| 2024–2025 | Carolina Ascent | 14 | (5) |

International career^{‡}
| 2023– | Israel | 11 | (1) |
- * Club domestic league appearances and goals as of May 31, 2025 ‡ National team caps and goals as of October 11, 2026

Elianna Esther Anna Hutchinson (née Beard; (Note: Hebrew: אליאנה אסתר אנה האצ'ינסון, née בירד) May 23, 1996) is a former professional soccer player who played as a midfielder. Born in the United States, she earned ten caps with the Israel national team. She played college soccer for the Marquette Golden Eagles. After a brief start in Kazakhstan, she joined Israeli club Maccabi Holon in 2018. She went on to spend six seasons in the Ligat Nashim, winning the league twice with Kiryat Gat, and had off-season spells in Iceland. She played for the Carolina Ascent in the inaugural USL Super League season before retiring in 2025.

== Early life ==
Hutchinson was born in Portland, Oregon, to Leslie and Peter Beard, one of four children raised in a Conservative Jewish family. She began playing soccer when she was eight. She attended Portland Jewish Academy and St. Mary's Academy, where she lettered in soccer all four years.

Hutchinson attended Marquette University, where she played for the Marquette Golden Eagles. She won the Big East Conference regular-season title as a junior in 2016. In her senior year in 2017, she started 20 games, scored 4 goals, and added 4 assists. She had a brace during the Big East tournament to help the team to the semifinals and was named to the all-tournament team. In four years with the Golden Eagles, she played in 66 games (28 starts) and scored 7 goals.

== Club career ==
Hutchinson began her professional career in Kazakhstan in June 2018, signing with perennial champions BIIK Kazygurt. She appeared in four of the team's five matches in the 2018–19 UEFA Women's Champions League. In the round of 32, she played in a surprising 3–1 victory over Barcelona before a record home crowd, but was unused in the away leg as the Spaniards came back and eliminated her team from the competition.

Soon later, in October 2018, Hutchinson moved to Israel and signed with Maccabi Holon. Maccabi finished fourth out of nine teams in her debut season in the Ligat Nashim. The following year, the team placed sixth out of eight in the regular season before the playoff rounds were cancelled in April 2020 due to the COVID-19 pandemic.

Hutchinson joined reigning champions Ramat HaSharon for her third season in Israel in 2020–21. She participated in the Champions League qualifying rounds and placed fifth out of ten teams in the Ligat Nashim. After one season there, she briefly played in Iceland with Grindavík of the second-tier Lengjudeild kvenna in the summer of 2021.

Hutchinson returned to Israel and joined reigning champions Kiryat Gat in the 2021–22 season. She helped the team to two league titles and the 2021–22 Israeli Women's Cup, scoring the opening goal in a 2–0 win in the final. Between two spells with Kiryat Gat, she was a non-roster invitee with the North Carolina Courage of the National Women's Soccer League (NWSL) in the 2023 preseason. She returned to the Israeli champions in the fall of 2023, playing in the Champions League and losing in the second qualifying round on penalties. In the summer of 2024, she returned to Iceland and played for Keflavík of the top-flight Besta deild kvenna.

USL Super League club Carolina Ascent announced on June 28, 2024, that the club had signed Hutchinson ahead of the league's inaugural season. After sitting out the first six games due to injury, she made her debut against Brooklyn FC on October 15. Her first USL goal came in a 2–1 road win against the Spokane Zephyr on March 8, 2025. On April 19, she scored twice as the Ascent won 3–0 against the Zephyr at home. Her fifth goal clinched the Players' Shield for the Ascent with a 1–1 draw against the Tampa Bay Sun on May 17. After the season, Hutchinson announced her retirement from professional soccer on June 14, 2025.

== International career ==
After obtaining Israeli citizenship through the Law of Return, Hutchison was required by FIFA to wait five years before she could play for the Israel national team. She made her international debut during the 2023–24 UEFA Women's Nations League, starting in a 5–0 victory over Estonia on September 26, 2023. She scored her first international goal on February 25, 2025, scoring the winner from right back in a 3–1 victory over Estonia in the 2025 UEFA Women's Nations League.

=== International goals ===
| No. | Date | Venue | Opponent | Score | Result | Competition |
|---|---|---|---|---|---|---|
| 1. | 25 February 2025 | Alcufer Stadion, Győr, Hungary | Estonia | 2–0 | 3–1 | 2025 UEFA Women's Nations League C |

== Personal life ==
Hutchinson married former Trinidad and Tobago international Lauryn Hutchinson on December 24, 2024. She has a UEFA B License and owns Unknwn Football Club, a Women's Premier Soccer League club in Richmond, Virginia, which her wife founded.

== Honors ==
BIIK Kazygurt

- Kazakhstani women's football championship: 2018

Carolina Ascent

- USL Super League Players' Shield: 2024–25

Kiryat Gat

- Ligat Nashim: 2021–22, 2022–23
- Israeli Women's Cup: 2021–22

Marquette Golden Eagles

- Big East Conference: 2016
