= Samantha Leshnak Murphy =

American soccer player (born 1997)

Samantha Murphy
Personal information
- Full name: Samantha Leshnak Murphy
- Birth name: Samantha Leshnak
- Date of birth: April 21, 1997 (age 29)
- Place of birth: Liberty Township, Ohio, U.S.
- Height: 5 ft 11 in (1.80 m)
- Position: Goalkeeper

Team information
- Current team: Braga

College career
Years	Team	Apps	(Gls)
2015–2018	North Carolina Tar Heels	54	(0)

Senior career*
Years	Team	Apps	(Gls)
2019–2021	North Carolina Courage	2	(0)
2022	Keflavík	18	(0)
2023–2024	Piteå	23	(0)
2025	Carolina Ascent	11	(0)
2025–2026	Rosengård	13	(0)
2026–	Braga	0	(0)
- * Club domestic league appearances and goals as of 13:29, July 6, 2026 (UTC)

Samantha Leshnak Murphy (née Leshnak; born April 21, 1997) is an American professional soccer player who plays as a goalkeeper for Campeonato Nacional Feminino club Braga. She played college soccer for the North Carolina Tar Heels and previously played professionally in the National Women's Soccer League (NWSL) for North Carolina Courage, in the Besta deild kvenna for Keflavík ÍF, in the Damallsvenskan for Piteå IF and FC Rosengård, and in the USL Super League for Carolina Ascent.

== College career ==
As a sophomore in 2016, Murphy served as the backup goalkeeper, appearing in just four games.

In her junior year, Murphy became the only scholarship goalkeeper on the roster, starting all 22 games.

During her senior season, Murphy was UNC’s starting goalkeeper and set a program record with a 1,119-minute scoreless streak. She finished with a 14-1-1 record with six solo shutouts. In the NCAA quarterfinals against UCLA, she made crucial penalty shootout saves, becoming just the third Tar Heel goalkeeper in history to win a shootout.

== Club career ==
In April 2019, Murphy signed as a goalkeeper replacement with North Carolina Courage.

Murphy received national attention at a match against the Portland Thorns FC in June 2020. At this match, Murphy chose not to kneel during the national anthem which drew praise and criticism on social media.

Murphy joined Piteå IF on January 13, 2023, signed by the club to replace departing goalkeeper Mandy Haught.

On February 14, 2025 it was announced she had signed with Carolina Ascent.

Murphy returned to Sweden in July 2025, signing for FC Rosengård.

On 6 July 2026, Murphy joined Portuguese Campeonato Nacional Feminino side S.C. Braga.

== Personal life ==
She attended Mount Notre Dame High School in Cincinnati, Ohio.

In June 2019, she married her husband, Kyle Murphy.

== Honors ==
Carolina Ascent

- USL Super League Players' Shield: 2024–25

North Carolina Courage

- NWSL Championship: 2019
- NWSL Shield: 2019
