= Rylee Baisden =

American soccer player (born 1994)

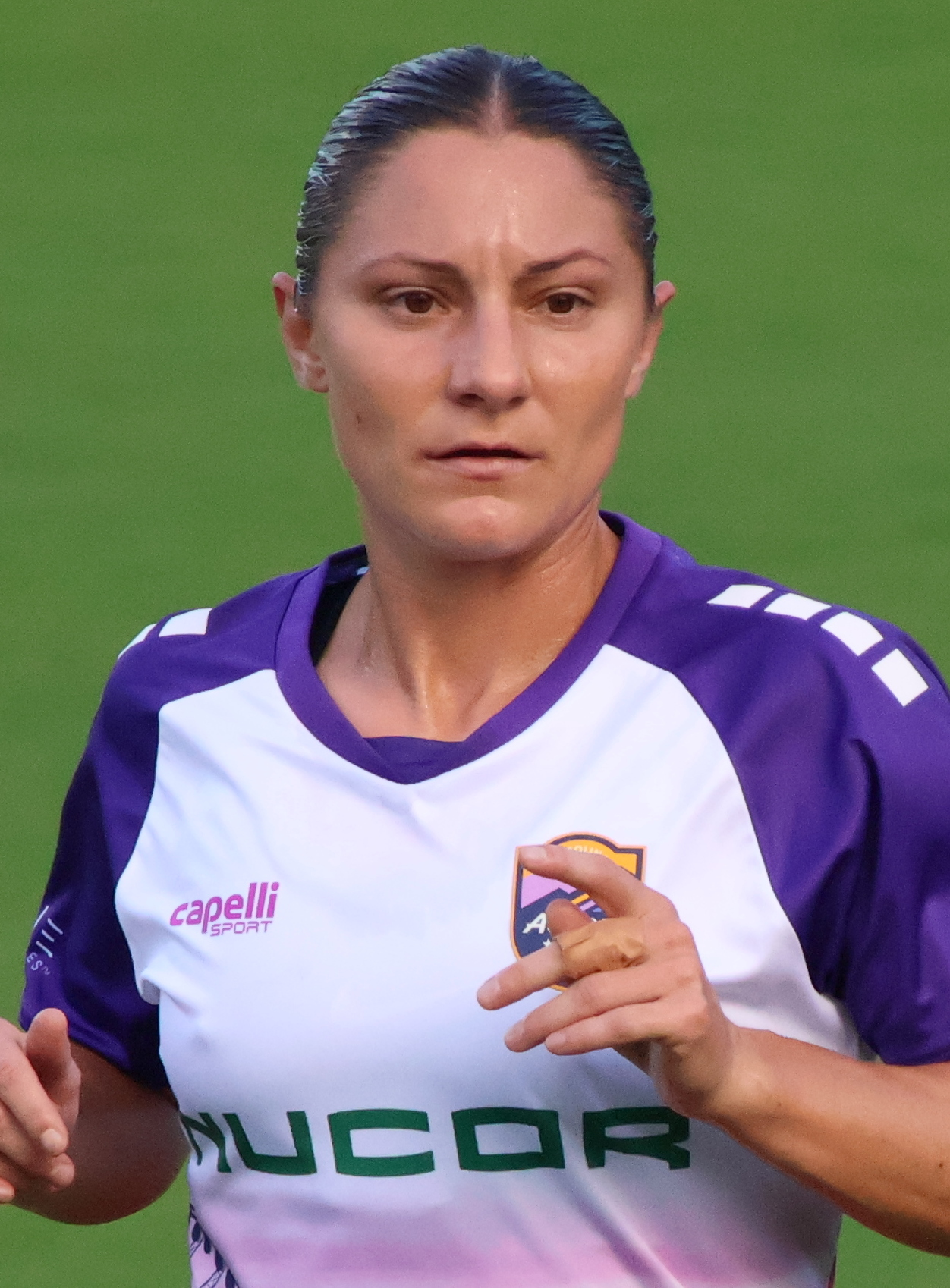
- Baisden with the Carolina Ascent in 2025

Personal information
- Full name: Rylee Ann Baisden
- Date of birth: April 16, 1994 (age 32)
- Place of birth: Yorba Linda, California, U.S.
- Height: 5 ft 3 in (1.60 m)
- Position: Forward

Team information
- Current team: Carolina Ascent
- Number: 10

College career
| Years | Team | Apps | (Gls) |
| 2012–2016 | Pepperdine Waves | 78 | (12) |

Senior career*
| Years | Team | Apps | (Gls) |
| 2018–2019 | Moreton Bay United | 23 | (33) |
| 2019–2020 | Brisbane Roar | 10 | (3) |
| 2020–2022 | North Carolina Courage | 12 | (1) |
| 2022–2023 | Perth Glory | 7 | (5) |
| 2024– | Carolina Ascent | 43 | (6) |
- * Club domestic league appearances and goals as of 17:23, June 4, 2026 (UTC)

Rylee Ann Baisden (born April 16, 1994) is an American professional soccer player who plays as a forward for USL Super League club Carolina Ascent. She played college soccer for the Pepperine Waves.

== Early life ==
Baisden grew up in Orange County, California and went to school in Los Angeles.

== College career ==
Baisden attended college at Pepperdine University.

== Club career ==
After her college career, Baisden went to play briefly in Sweden and played for a year in France.

For the 2018–19 season, Baisden moved to Australia to play for Morton Bay United in the National Premier League where she scored 33 goals in 23 games. Due to her form Baisden was named in the league's team of the season, was nominated for player of the year and participated in Morton Bay's maiden grand final appearance. On the back of this form Baisden was drafted by Brisbane Roar ahead of the 2019–20 W-League season. Baisden admitted that she did not expect to be offered the contract. She debuted in Brisbane's first game of the 2019–20 season against Melbourne Victory, and scored her first goal in the W-league in their next match, a 3–1 loss to Western Sydney Wanderers.

Baisden signed a fall contract with the North Carolina Courage in September 2020, followed by a one-year contract with an option for another year in January 2021. On her debut, she recorded an assist to her former Pepperdine teammate Lynn Williams in a win against the Houston Dash in September 2020. She scored her first NWSL goal in a win against the Chicago Red Stars in August 2022.

On January 31, 2023, Baisden suffered a long-term ACL injury whilst playing against Melbourne Victory, ruling her out for the rest of the season.

Baisden was named to the Courage's preseason roster in February 2024.

In May 2024, Baisden signed with USL Super League club Carolina Ascent FC.

== International career ==
Baisden represented the United States at the World University Games in Taiwan.

== Personal life ==
Baisden is passionate about photography, and has started a photography business, where she also works with drones. She started an online fitness business, Sweat Happy Club, in 2020.

== Honors ==
Carolina Ascent

- USL Super League Players' Shield: 2024–25

North Carolina Courage

- NWSL Challenge Cup: 2022
