= B Hylton =

English footballer

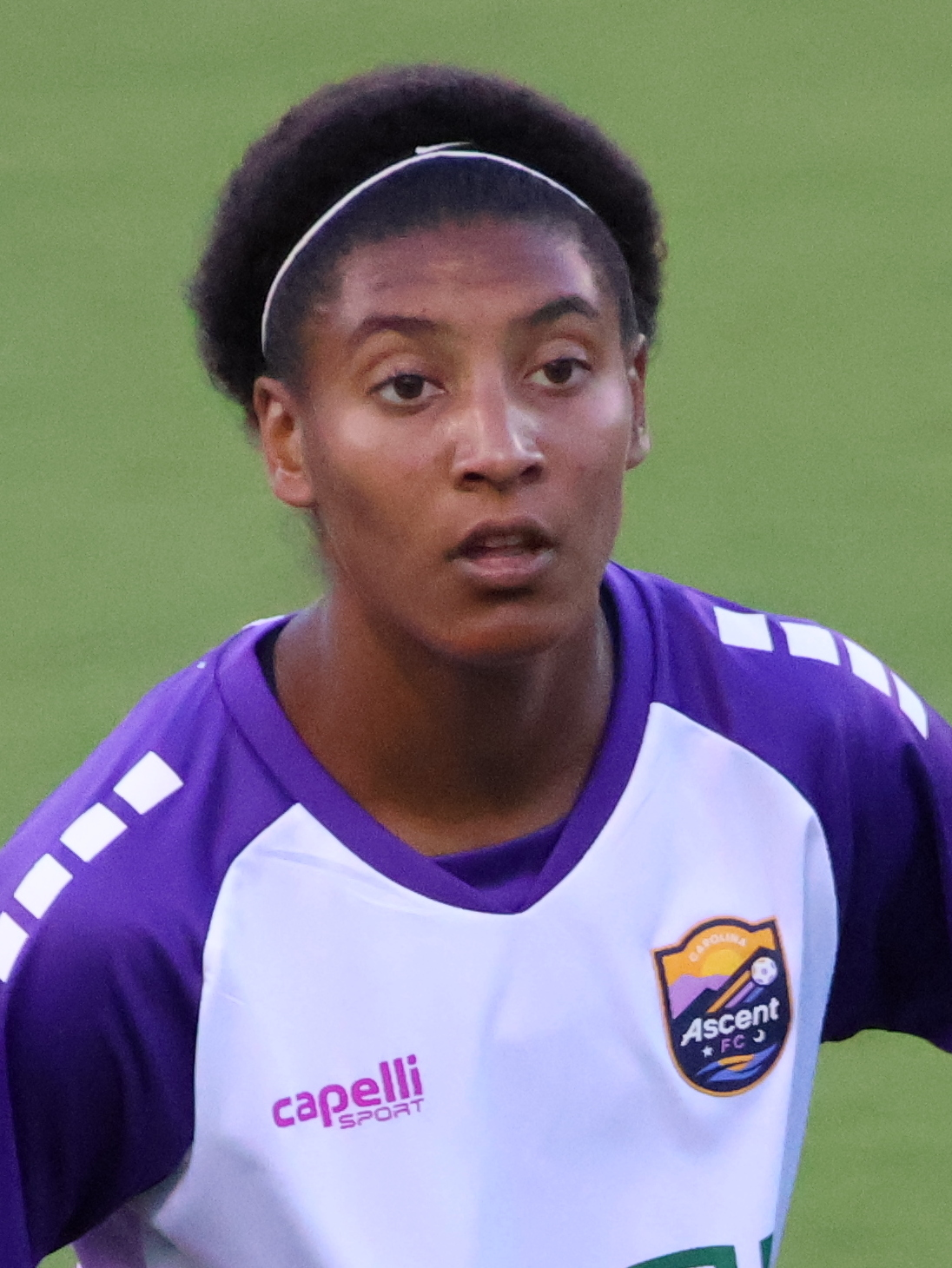
- Hylton with the Carolina Ascent in 2025

Personal information
- Full name: Chloe Abigail Hylton
- Date of birth: April 25, 2007 (age 19)
- Place of birth: Charlotte, North Carolina, United States
- Height: 5 ft 6 in (1.68 m)
- Position: Midfielder

Team information
- Current team: Carolina Ascent
- Number: 22

Senior career*
Years	Team	Apps	(Gls)
2024–	Carolina Ascent	24	(1)

International career^{‡}
2024–	England U19	5	(1)
2025–	England U20	11	(1)
- * Club domestic league appearances and goals as of 17:26, June 4, 2026 (UTC) ‡ National team caps and goals as of 17:54, 7 September 2026 (UTC)

Chloe Abigail ''B'' Hylton (born April 25, 2007) is a professional soccer player who plays as a midfielder for USL Super League club Carolina Ascent and the England under-19 and under-20 national teams. Born in the United States, she currently represents England on the youth international stage.

== Early life ==
Chloe Abigail Hylton was born on April 25, 2007, in Charlotte, North Carolina, to Andy and Bechy Hylton. She has a brother and a sister. Her brother, Caleb, plays college soccer for Lipscomb University. Both of Hylton's parents played soccer at collegiate level; her father is English and grew up in London before moving to Charlotte, where he played for the Charlotte Eagles.

In 2023, at age 16, she led Charlotte Development Academy to the under-19 Development Player League title and was named the Development Pro League National Player of the Year. She attended Covenant Day School in Matthews, North Carolina, where she earned all-state honors twice.

Hylton had been committed to play college soccer for the North Carolina State Wolfpack.

== Club career ==
On June 13, 2024, Carolina Ascent FC announced that the club had signed Hylton to an academy contract ahead of the USL Super League's inaugural season. She debuted in the league's inaugural game, a 1–0 win against DC Power FC, where she came on as a second-half substitute for Giovanna DeMarco. Hylton's first goal came in a 5–0 win against Brooklyn FC on April 12, 2025. In doing so, she became the youngest scored in the Carolina Ascent's history.

On June 6, 2025, the Ascent announced that Hylton had signed a professional contract with the club, making her the Ascent's first academy player to make the transition to professional play with the club.

== International career ==
Born in the United States to an English father, Hylton received her first international call-up to the England under-19 team in November 2024. She made her international debut on November 27, 2024, starting in a 2–1 win against Turkey during 2025 Under-19 Euro qualification.

On November 21, 2025, Hylton received her first call-up to England's under-20 squad. Ahead of the 2026 U-20 World Cup, Hylton was named to England's squad for a series of preparation camps and friendly fixtures between May and September 2026. In April 2026, Hylton was called up to the under-19 team for the second round of 2026 Under-19 Euro qualification. On April 9, 2026, she scored her first goal for the side in England's 5–0 victory over Latvia. On August 21, 2026, Hylton was called up to England's final squad for the U-20 World Cup. She became the first professional Carolina Ascent player to receive a World Cup call-up (senior or youth) while on the club's roster.

== Personal life ==
Hylton is a dual-national of the United States and the United Kingdom (through her English father).

== Honors ==
Carolina Ascent

- USL Super League Players' Shield: 2024–25
