= Riley Parker (soccer) =

American soccer player (born 2000)

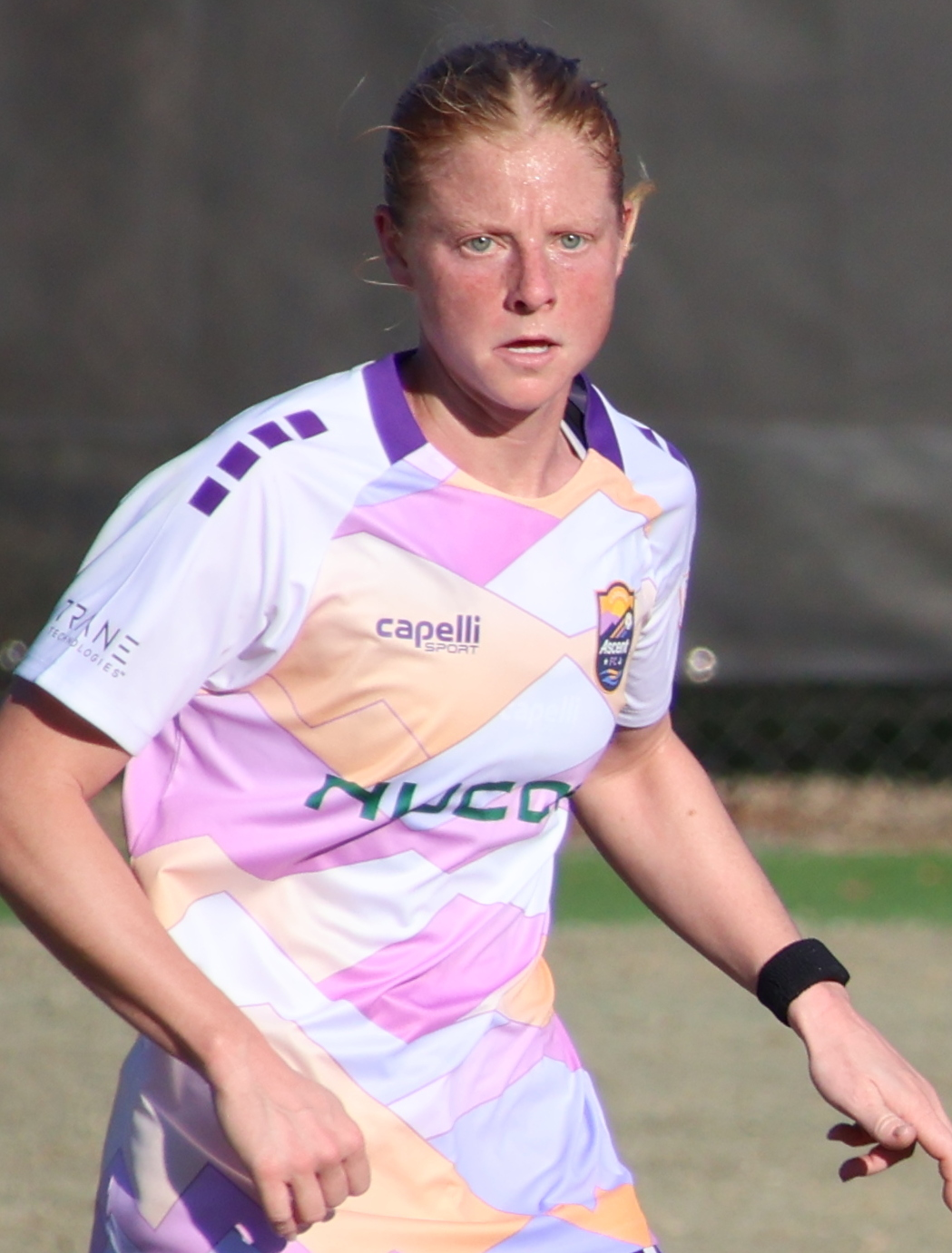
- Parker with the Carolina Ascent in 2026

Personal information
- Full name: Riley Grace Mattingly Parker
- Birth name: Riley Grace Mattingly
- Date of birth: March 31, 2000 (age 26)
- Place of birth: Dallas, Texas, United States
- Height: 1.73 m (5 ft 8 in)
- Position: Forward

Team information
- Current team: Carolina Ascent
- Number: 23

Youth career
- Solar SC
- 2015–2018: Marcus Marauders

College career
Years	Team	Apps	(Gls)
2019–2022	Alabama Crimson Tide	74	(25)

Senior career*
Years	Team	Apps	(Gls)
2019	SouthStar FC		
2022	Alabama FC		(5)
2023	Racing Louisville	0	(0)
2023	→ Tigres (loan)	8	(2)
2024	Tampa Bay Sun	10	(0)
2025–	Carolina Ascent	40	(2)
- * Club domestic league appearances and goals as of 17:28, June 4, 2026 (UTC)

Riley Grace Mattingly Parker (née Mattingly; born March 31, 2000) is an American professional soccer player who plays as a forward for USL Super League club Carolina Ascent. She played college soccer for the Alabama Crimson Tide, earning first-team All-American honors in 2022.

== Early life ==
Parker was born and raised in Dallas, Texas, and attended Edward S. Marcus High School in Flower Mound, Texas. As a child, she appeared on an episode of the children's television show Barney & Friends.

Parker played youth soccer for Elite Clubs National League (ECNL) club Solar SC, reaching the state conference championship in 2015, 2016, and 2017, and placing third at the 2015 ECNL National finals. She also played high school soccer at Edward S. Marcus High School, where she was named the team's most valuable player in 2016 and 2017.

Parker committed to playing for the University of Alabama in 2015.

== College career ==
On February 19, 2021, in the first half of the first match of the 2021 spring season, Parker tore her right anterior cruciate ligament, which forced her to miss both the spring and fall seasons.

After redshirting her senior season, Parker scored 17 goals in her final season as a graduate player in 2022, setting an Alabama single-season record. The Crimson Tide reached a program-best No. 1 national ranking during the season and advanced to the Women's College Cup semi-finals for the first time. Riley also served as team captain during her final season. She was named first-team All-Southeastern Conference, first-team All-American, and the SEC Forward of the Year. She was also named one of 15 semifinalists for the Hermann Trophy.

== Club career ==
While still attending the University of Alabama, Parker played for Women's Premier Soccer League clubs SouthStar FC in 2019 and Alabama FC in 2022.

=== Racing Louisville FC, 2023 ===
Racing Louisville FC selected Parker with the 31st-overall pick in the 2023 NWSL Draft.

On February 1, 2023, before the start of the 2023 NWSL season, Racing signed Parker to a one-year contract with an option for an additional year. The following day, the club loaned her to Tigres UANL of Liga MX Femenil for the 2023 Torneo Clausura.

On August 17, 2023, she was waived by Racing Louisville.

==== Tigres UANL (loan), 2023 ====
Parker debuted for Tigres on March 5, 2023, against Club Léon as a 59th-minute substitute for Belén Cruz. After earning a yellow card for an altercation with Léon player Ruth Bravo, who made contact with Tigres forward Mia Fishel during a substitution, Parker scored the first goal of her professional career in the second minute of second-half stoppage time.

Tigres finished second in the Clausura and reached the Liguilla semi-finals before losing to eventual champions Club América.

=== Tampa Bay Sun FC, 2024 ===
Parker signed with the Tampa Bay Sun on April 29, 2024, ahead of the inaugural USL Super League season. Parker made her debut on August 18, 2024 for Tampa Bay's inaugural match against Dallas Trinity. Parker played 10 matches for Tampa Bay during the 2024 Fall Season, 6 of them as a starter.

=== Carolina Ascent FC, 2025– ===
In January 2025, Parker transferred to Carolina Ascent, ahead of the USL Super League's 2025 Spring Season.

== Personal life ==
Parker married former Alabama Crimson Tide football wide receiver John Parker in 2022. She graduated magna cum laude in 2021 with a bachelor of arts in communication and information sciences.

== Career statistics ==
=== College ===
College	Regular Season				SEC Tournament		NCAA Tournament		Total	
College	Conference	Season	Apps	Goals	Apps	Goals	Apps	Goals	Apps	Goals
Alabama Crimson Tide	SEC	2018	19	1	—		—		19	1
Alabama Crimson Tide	SEC	2019	18	5	2	0	—		20	5
Alabama Crimson Tide	SEC	2020–21	8	2	1	0	—		9	2
Alabama Crimson Tide	SEC	2021	DNP						0	0
Alabama Crimson Tide	SEC	2022	17	12	3	2	6	3	26	17
Career total			62	20	6	2	6	3	74	25

=== Club summary ===
As of February 15, 2025

Club	Season	League			League Cup		Playoffs		Total	
Club	Season	Division	Apps	Goals	Apps	Goals	Apps	Goals	Apps	Goals
Racing Louisville	2023	NWSL	0	0	—		—		0	0
Tigres (loan)	2023–24	Liga MX Femenil	0	0	8	2	—		8	2
Tampa Bay Sun FC	2024–25	USL Super League	10	0	—		0	0	10	0
Carolina Ascent FC	2024–25	USL Super League	1	0	0	0	0	0	1	0
Career total			11	0	8	2	0	0	19	2

== Honors ==
Carolina Ascent

- USL Super League Players' Shield: 2024–25
