= Addisyn Merrick =

American soccer player (born 1998)

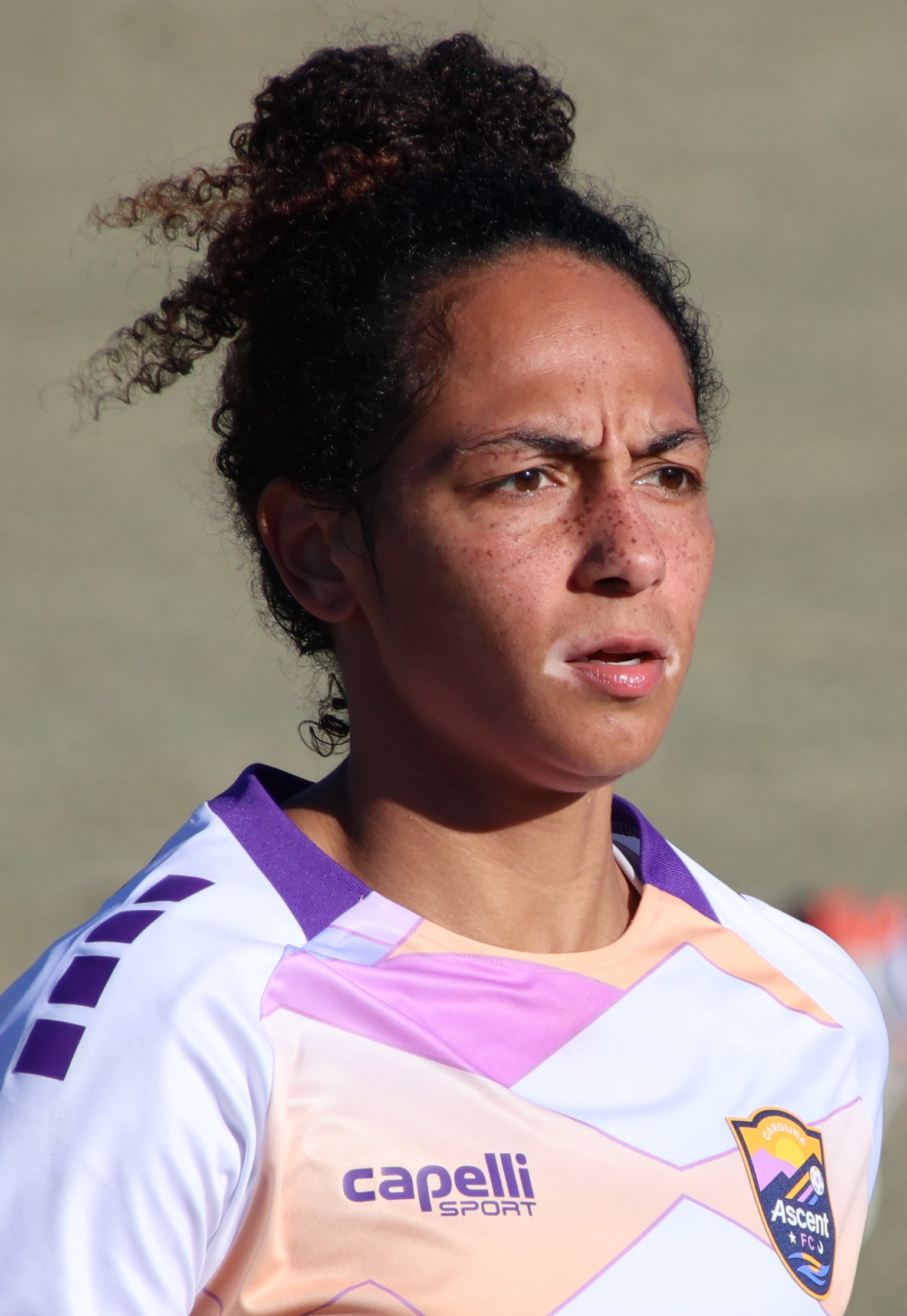
- Merrick with the Carolina Ascent in 2026

Personal information
- Full name: Addisyn Jade Merrick
- Date of birth: March 4, 1998 (age 28)
- Place of birth: Lee's Summit, Missouri, U.S.
- Height: 5 ft 5 in (1.65 m)
- Positions: Right back; center back

Team information
- Current team: Carolina Ascent
- Number: 13

College career
Years	Team	Apps	(Gls)
2016–2019	Kansas Jayhawks	87	(1)

Senior career*
Years	Team	Apps	(Gls)
2020	North Carolina Courage	0	(0)
2021–2022	Racing Louisville	5	(0)
2022–2023	Kansas City Current	27	(0)
2024	Utah Royals	4	(0)
2024–	Carolina Ascent FC	33	(1)
- * Club domestic league appearances and goals as of 17:27, June 4, 2026 (UTC)

Addisyn Jade Merrick (born March 4, 1998) is an American professional soccer player who plays as a right back for USL Super League club Carolina Ascent. She played college soccer for the Kansas Jayhawks. She has previously played for the North Carolina Courage, Racing Louisville, Kansas City Current, and Utah Royals of the National Women's Soccer League (NWSL).

== Club career ==
Merrick made her professional debut for the North Carolina Courage on June 27, 2020, in the 2020 NWSL Challenge Cup against Portland Thorns FC.

On November 12, 2020, Merrick was selected by Racing Louisville FC in the 2020 NWSL Expansion Draft. She made her Racing debut on June 23 against her former club, but she only appeared in three matches before suffering an ankle injury.

Merrick returned to full health in time for the 2022 NWSL Challenge Cup, starting the first five matches of the competition. She made two starts for Racing Louisville in the regular season with a notable start against San Diego resulting in a win.

Merrick was traded to the Kansas City Current along with Cece Kizer on June 9, 2022. She made her Kansas City debut on June 11, 2022, against Gotham FC subbing in for Victoria Pickett in the 61'. She made her first start for the Current on July 10, 2022, against the Washington Spirit.

She signed with Utah Royals in December 2023. Merrick and Utah parted ways in September 2024.

On September 5, 2024, Merrick signed with Carolina Ascent of the USL Super League.

== Honors ==
Carolina Ascent

- USL Super League Players' Shield: 2024–25

Kansas Jayhawks

- Big 12 Conference women's soccer tournament: 2019

Individual

- Big 12 Conference Defensive Player of the Year: 2019
