= Meagan McClelland =

American soccer player (born 2000)

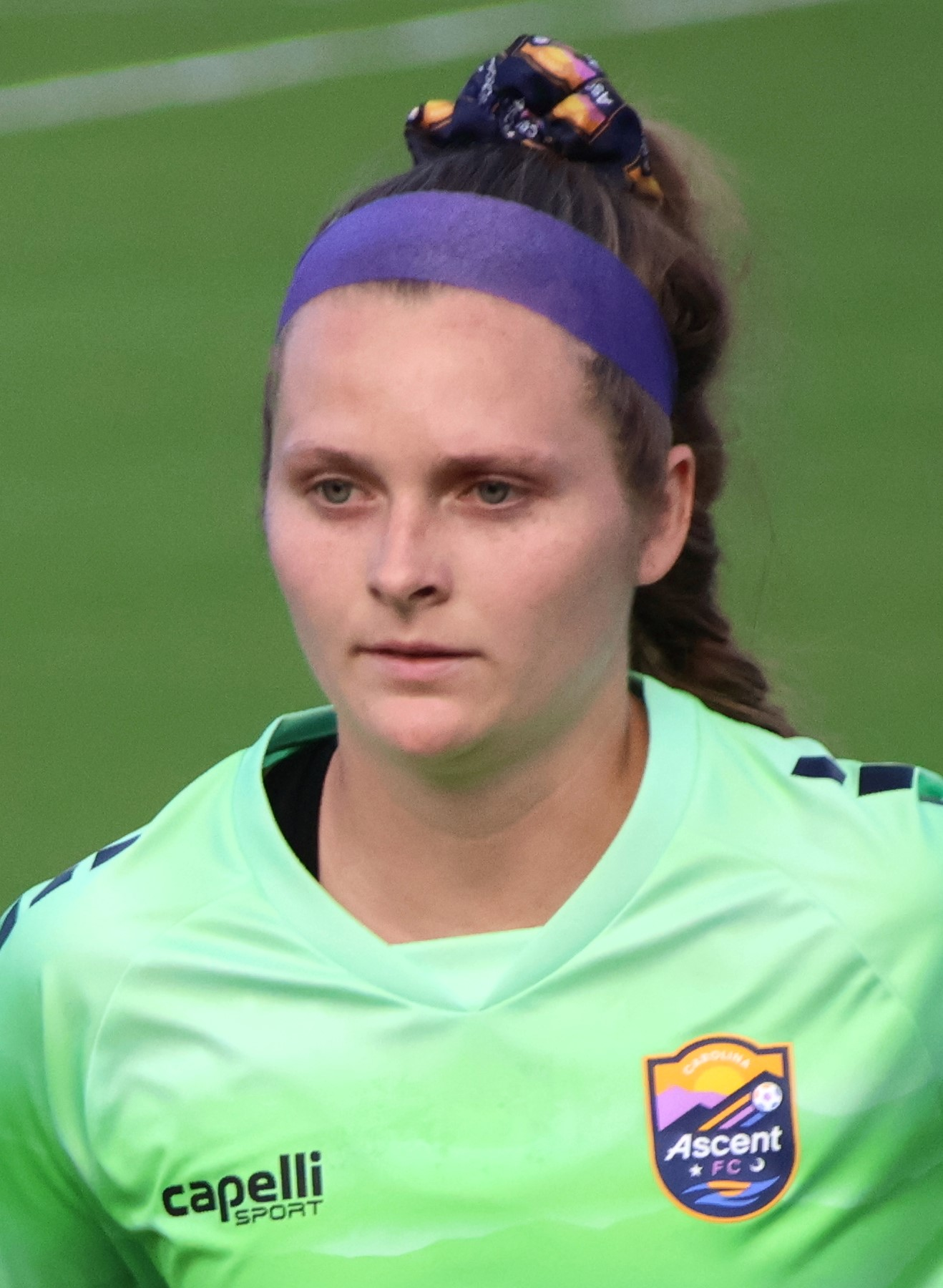
- McClelland with the Carolina Ascent in 2025

Personal information
- Full name: Meagan Erin McClelland
- Date of birth: August 5, 2000 (age 26)
- Place of birth: Kearny, New Jersey, U.S.
- Height: 5 ft 9 in (1.75 m)
- Position: Goalkeeper

Youth career
- 2008–2018: PDA

College career
Years	Team	Apps	(Gls)
2018–2022	Rutgers Scarlet Knights	102	(0)

Senior career*
Years	Team	Apps	(Gls)
2023	Chicago Red Stars	0	(0)
2023	San Diego Wave	0	(0)
2023	NJ/NY Gotham FC	0	(0)
2024	Odense Boldklub Q	9	(0)
2024–2026	Carolina Ascent	34	(0)
2026	Angel City	0	(0)

International career^{‡}
2016	United States U17		
2017	United States U19	1	(0)
2019	United States U20	2	(0)
2019	United States U23	1	(0)
- * Club domestic league appearances and goals as of 02:08, September 23, 2026 (UTC) ‡ National team caps and goals as of December 13, 2019

Meagan Erin McClelland (born August 5, 2000) is an American professional soccer player who plays as a goalkeeper. She played college soccer for the Rutgers Scarlet Knights, where she was named Big Ten Freshman of the Year and All-Big Ten four times. After stints with several NWSL clubs, she made her professional debut for Danish club Odense Boldklub Q in 2024, helping them earn promotion to the top flight. Later that year, she joined USL Super League club Carolina Ascent, winning the inaugural Golden Glove and Players' Shield in 2025.

== Early life ==
McClelland grew up in Kearny, New Jersey, one of three children born to Coleen and Patrick McClelland. She began playing soccer when she was three and joined Mike O'Neill's PDA academy at age eight. She played multiple outfield positions before turning to goalkeeper when she received goalkeeping gloves as a Christmas present in third grade. She also played basketball growing up and starred in both sports at Kearny High School. She kept 20 clean sheets in one-and-a-half seasons with the soccer team, and she scored 1,348 points in 91 games for the basketball team. She committed to Rutgers as a sophomore.

== College career ==
McClelland succeeded Casey Murphy as the starting goalkeeper for the Rutgers Scarlet Knights. In her freshman season in 2018, she played all 20 games and kept 8 clean sheets, leading the Big Ten Conference in goals against average. Rutgers placed second in the conference and qualified for the Big Ten and NCAA tournaments, losing in both first rounds. McClelland was named the Big Ten Freshman of the Year and third-team All-Big Ten. In her sophomore season, she kept 12 clean sheets in 21 games, earning second-team All-Big Ten honors and helping Rutgers repeat as Big Ten regular-season runners-up. They made the semifinals of the Big Ten tournament but lost in the first round of the NCAA tournament. She became team captain in her junior season, which was pushed back to the spring because of the COVID-19 pandemic. She kept 7 clean sheets in 16 games, earning second-team All-Big Ten honors, as Rutgers made the Big Ten tournament semifinals and the second round of the NCAA tournament.

McClelland and Rutgers had a banner year in her senior season in 2021. She made a career-high 83 saves and kept a career-high 13 clean sheets in 25 games, earning third-team All-Big Ten honors. Rutgers went 10–0 in conference play to claim the program's first Big Ten regular-season title, and they did not concede in the Big Ten tournament until the final where they lost to Michigan. In the NCAA tournament, McClelland saved three penalty kicks and made one herself in a third-round shootout win against TCU, then saved one kick and converted another in a quarterfinal shootout win against Arkansas. The No. 1 seed Scarlet Knights reached their second-ever national semifinal where they fell to eventual champions No. 1 Florida State. McClelland returned to use her fifth year of eligibility, granted by the NCAA due to the pandemic. She kept 8.5 clean sheets in 20 games as Rutgers finished seventh in the conference in 2022. She left college with the second-most minutes played in NCAA history behind McKinley Crone.

== Club career ==
McClelland was not selected in the 2023 NWSL Draft but was invited to preseason training with the Chicago Red Stars, who signed her to a short-term national team replacement contract on April 7, 2023. Later that year, she signed further short-team deals with San Diego Wave FC in July and NJ/NY Gotham FC in September. She signed a permanent contract with Gotham in November as they finished the season as NWSL champions.

McClelland returned to Gotham for the 2024 preseason before going overseas to join Danish Women's 1st Division club Odense Boldklub Q on February 26, 2024. She made her professional debut in a 1–1 draw against B.93 on March 16. She ended up making 9 starts and kept 6 clean sheets, helping Odense secure promotion to the top division, before returning to the United States after her last game on June 8.

On June 6, 2024, Carolina Ascent FC announced the signing of McClelland before the inaugural season of the USL Super League. She started in the league's inaugural game as the Ascent won 1–0 against DC Power FC on August 27. She kept 6 clean sheets through 11 games and was the only goalkeeper in the league to start every game in the inaugural fall series. McClelland earned the inaugural Golden Glove Award with the best goals against average in the league, having allowed just 17 goals in 18 appearances. McClelland regained the starting job at the start of the following season.

On August 7, 2026, it was announced that McClelland had signed a short-term contract with Angel City FC, returning to the NWSL. She did not make an appearance in her one-month stint with the club.

== International career ==
She was called into the United States national under-17 team shortly before the 2016 FIFA U-17 Women's World Cup and made the tournament roster as a bench player. She later appeared in friendlies at the under-19, under-20, and under-23 levels.

== Honors and awards ==
Rutgers Scarlet Knights

- Big Ten Conference: 2021

NJ/NY Gotham FC

- NWSL Championship: 2023

Carolina Ascent

- USL Super League Players' Shield: 2024–25

Individual

- USL Super League Golden Glove: 2024–25
- Second-team All-Big Ten: 2019, 2020
- Third-team All-Big Ten: 2018, 2021
- Big Ten Freshman of the Year: 2018
