= Vicky Bruce =

American soccer player

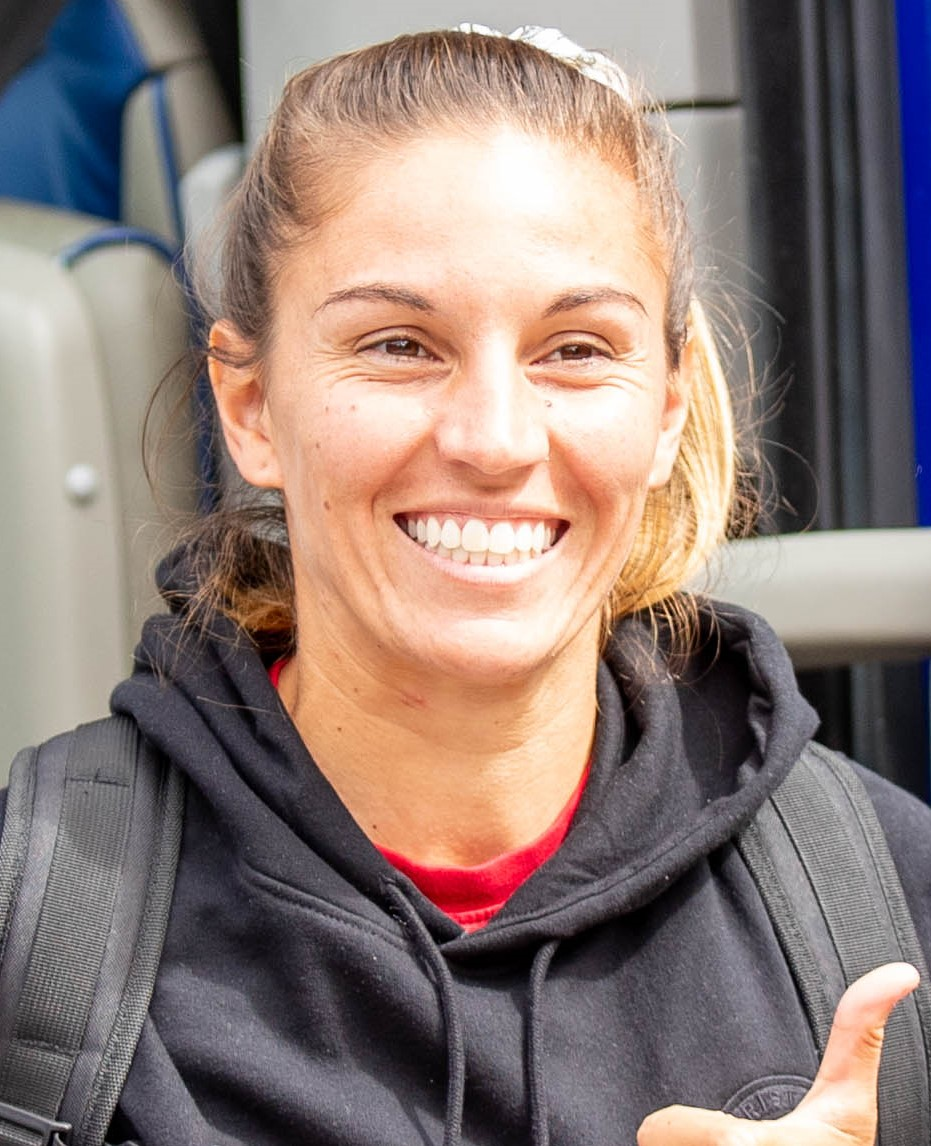
- Bruce with Bristol City in 2022

Personal information
- Full name: Victoria Frances Bruce
- Date of birth: May 31, 1994 (age 32)
- Place of birth: Cornelius, North Carolina, United States
- Height: 1.63 m (5 ft 4 in)
- Position: Defender

Youth career
- Cannon School

College career
Years	Team	Apps	(Gls)
2012–2013	North Carolina Tar Heels	18	(0)
2014–2015	Davidson Wildcats	38	(4)

Senior career*
Years	Team	Apps	(Gls)
2016	Rangers		
2017	Fimleikafélag Hafnarfjarðar	12	(0)
2017–2018	Apollon Limassol		
2018–2019	Morön BK	7	(4)
2020–2021	Fortuna Hjørring	27	(2)
2021–2022	SC Sand	22	(0)
2022–2023	Bristol City	21	(0)
2023–2024	Western Sydney Wanderers	22	(3)
2024–2025	Carolina Ascent	20	(1)

International career
- United States U14
- United States U15
- United States U16
- * Club domestic league appearances and goals as of May 31, 2025

Victoria Frances Bruce (born May 31, 1994) is an American soccer player who plays as a defender. She played college soccer for the North Carolina Tar Heels and the Davidson Wildcats.

== Early life ==
Bruce graduated from Cannon School in Concord, North Carolina. As a player at Cannon School, she played all three positions on the field and was selected All-Conference, All-Region and All-State in the NCISAA. She did not compete during her junior year, due to an injury. She was also team captain as a senior.

== Career ==
She previously played for Morön BK in the Elitettan, Apollon Limassol in the Cypriot First Division, Fimleikafélag Hafnarfjarðar in the Úrvalsdeild kvenna and Rangers in the Scottish Women's Premier League (SWPL).

=== Fortuna Hjørring ===
In January 2020, she signed with the Fortuna Hjørring, in the Elitedivisionen league.

=== Western Sydney Wanderers ===
In September 2023, Bruce joined Australian club Western Sydney Wanderers.

=== Carolina Ascent ===
In May 2024, Bruce was announced as the first-ever signing for USL Super League club Carolina Ascent. On August 17, 2024, she guided the team to a 1-0 victory over DC Power FC in the 2024–25 USL Super League season opener, with Bruce scoring the league's first goal in the 28th minute.

On July 18, 2025, Bruce announced via social media that she would be temporarily stepping away from professional soccer.

== Honors ==
Carolina Ascent

- USL Super League Players' Shield: 2024–25

North Carolina Tar Heels

- NCAA Women's College Cup: 2012

Fortuna Hjørring

- Danish Women's League: 2019–20

Bristol City

- FA Women's Championship: 2022–23
