= Carolina Ascent FC =

Women's soccer club in Charlotte, North Carolina

- Founded: May 16, 2023; 3 years ago
- Stadium: American Legion Memorial Stadium
- Capacity: 10,500
- Head coach: Philip Poole
- League: USL Super League
- 2025–26: USL Super League, 3rd of 9; Playoffs: Runners-up
- Website: www.carolinaascent.com
Home colors	Away colors

Carolina Ascent Football Club is an American professional women's soccer club based in Charlotte, North Carolina, that competes in the USL Super League (USLS). The club also features an affiliate team in the USL W League (USLW), which began play in summer 2024.

== History ==
Charlotte was named as one of the eight team locations in the USL Super League on May 16, 2023. The team name was announced on March 21, 2024. The Ascent named USWNT assistant coach, Philip Poole, as the head coach in January 2024.

The club announced its plans for a USL W League affiliate on December 13, 2023. The team follows the Charlotte Independence women's team which featured in the 2022 and 2023 W League seasons. Erika Duncan, who was an assistant coach with the W League's Charlotte Independence during its two seasons, served as the W League team's inaugural head coach for the 2024 W League season before transitioning to her role as assistant coach for the Super League team.

=== Inaugural season ===
Carolina played in the inaugural match of the USL Super League, where Vicky Bruce scored the league's and the club's first-ever goal. Renee Guion also become the first player in the league to receive a yellow card. Carolina secured a 1-0 victory against DC Power FC. During their second game, Carolina tied 1-1 against Lexington SC.

=== Sponsorship ===
Period	Kit manufacturer	Shirt sponsor (front)	Shirt sponsor (back)	Sleeve sponsor	Ref.
2024–present	Capelli Sport	Nucor	Novant Health	N/A	

== Players and staff ==
=== Current roster ===
As of October 29, 2026

Note: Flags indicate national team as defined under FIFA eligibility rules; some limited exceptions apply. Players may hold more than one non-FIFA nationality.

No.	Pos.	Nation	Player
0	GK	USA	Hope Hisey
2	DF	USA	Reese Tappan
4	FW	USA	Ava Cook
5	DF	USA	Jenna Butler
7	DF	PUR	Jill Aguilera
8	DF	USA	Emily Moxley
9	FW	USA	Mia Corbin
10	FW	USA	Rylee Baisden
12	DF	USA	Sydney Studer
13	DF	USA	Addisyn Merrick
14	MF	USA	Taylor Porter (captain)

No.	Pos.	Nation	Player
15	GK	PUR	Sydney Martinez
18	FW	USA	Audrey Coleman
19	DF	USA	Meaghan Nally
20	MF	USA	Shea Groom
22	MF	ENG	B Hylton
23	FW	USA	Riley Parker
24	MF	USA	Emily Morris
28	MF	USA	Lily Nabet
31	FW	USA	Mackenzie George
70	FW	USA	Stella Spitzer

=== Former players ===
For details of former players, see Category:Carolina Ascent FC players and List of Carolina Ascent FC players.

=== Staff ===
As of August 9, 2024*

Front office
Position	Name
CEO & Managing Partner	(United States) Jim McPhilliamy
Technical staff
Head Coach	(United States) Philip Poole

== Honors ==
- USL Super League
  - Players' Shield (1): 2024-25

== Records ==
=== Year-by-year ===
==== First team ====
As of April 20, 2025

Season	League	Division	Regular season									Playoffs
Season	League	Division	P	W	D	L	GF	GA	GD	Pts.	Pos.	Playoffs
2024	USL W	South Atlantic	12	7	1	4	36	10	+26	22	3rd	Did not qualify
2024–25	USL Super League	-	24	12	7	5	38	19	+19	43	1st	Semifinals

==== Second team ====
Season	League	Division	Regular season									Playoffs
Season	League	Division	P	W	D	L	GF	GA	GD	Pts.	Pos.	Playoffs
2025	USL W	South Atlantic	11	5	2	4	30	23	+7	17	5th	Did not qualify
2026	USL W	South Atlantic	10	4	1	5	15	19	–4	13	4th	Did not qualify

=== Team records ===
As of June 4, 2026. Current players in bold. Statistics are updated once a year after the conclusion of the USL Super League season.

Most appearances
Player					Appearances		
#	Name	Nat.	Pos.	Ascent career	USLS	Playoffs	Total
1	Jill Aguilera	(Puerto Rico)	DF	2024–	55	3	58
1	Taylor Porter	(United States)	MF	2024–	55	3	58
3	Mia Corbin	(United States)	FW	2024–	54	3	57
4	Audrey Coleman	(United States)	FW	2024–	46	3	49
5	Sydney Studer	(United States)	DF	2024–	44	1	45
6	Rylee Baisden	(United States)	FW	2024–	43	1	44
6	Jenna Butler	(United States)	DF	2025–	41	3	44
8	Riley Parker	(United States)	FW	2025–	40	3	43
9	Addisyn Merrick	(United States)	DF	2024–	33	3	36
10	Meagan McClelland	(United States)	GK	2024–	34	0	34

Top goalscorers
Player					Goals scored		
#	Name	Nat.	Pos.	Ascent career	USLS	Playoffs	Total
1	**Mia Corbin**	(United States)	FW	2024–	16	1	17
2	**Audrey Coleman**	(United States)	FW	2024–	7	0	7
3	**Jill Aguilera**	(Puerto Rico)	DF	2024–	6	0	6
3	**Rylee Baisden**	(United States)	FW	2024–	6	0	6
5	Eli Hutchinson	(Israel)	FW	2024–2025	5	0	5
6	**Sydney Studer**	(United States)	DF	2024–	4	0	4
6	**Mackenzie George**	(United States)	FW	2025–	3	1	4
6	**Tyler Lussi**	(United States)	FW	2026–	4	0	4
6	Maddie Mercado	(United States)	MF	2025	4	0	4
