= 2026 Lexington SC (women) fall season =

2026 Lexington SC Fall season

Lexington SC
2026 season
- Owners: Bill and Donna Shively; Stephen Dawahare
- Head coach: Kosuke Kimura
- Stadium: Lexington SC Stadium; Lexington, Kentucky
- All statistics correct as of 26 July 2026.

The 2026 Lexington SC fall season is the club's third season in the USL Super League, in which Lexington is a founding club.

The USLS plans to adopt its first spring-to-fall campaign in 2027. This means that the 2026 season is an smaller season with 14 matches per team.

== Staff ==
As of 28 January 2026.

Position	Name	Refs
Head Coach	(Japan) Kosuke Kimura	
Assistant Coach	(United States) Taylor Leach	
Assistant Coach	(United States) Bert Leonard	
Assistant Coach	(United States) Shane O'Neill	
Goalkeeping Coach	(United States) Nate Walzer	
Equipment Manager	(United States) Matthew Thomsen	

== Players and staff ==
=== USL Super League current roster ===
As of July 17, 2026

Note: Flags indicate national team as defined under FIFA eligibility rules; some limited exceptions apply. Players may hold more than one non-FIFA nationality.

No.	Pos.	Nation	Player
2	FW	USA	Hannah White
3	DF	USA	Allison Pantuso
6	MF	USA	Taylor Aylmer
7	GK	USA	Marz Josephson
9	FW	USA	Amber Nguyen
10	MF	USA	Mac Midgley
11	FW	USA	McKenzie Weinert
12	DF	USA	Alyssa Bourgeois
15	FW	USA	Catherine Barry
16	DF	USA	Ally Brown
17	MF	USA	Tati Fung

No.	Pos.	Nation	Player
18	MF	USA	Addie McCain
19	DF	USA	Hannah Johnson
20	MF	USA	Darya Rajaee
22	DF	USA	Regan Steigleder
23	MF	USA	Nicole Vernis
24	GK	USA	Ryan Campbell (on loan from Gotham FC)
26	MF	USA	Katie Murray
28	MF	USA	Cassie Rohan
35	FW	USA	Sarah Griffith
66	DF	USA	Gracie Falla

== Competitions ==
=== USL Super League ===
==== Regular season standings ====
Pos	Team	Pld	W	L	T	GF	GA	GD	Pts	Qualification
2	DC Power FC	13	7	3	3	21	12	+9	24	Playoffs
3	Sporting Club Jacksonville	13	5	2	6	26	20	+6	21	Playoffs
4	Lexington SC	12	5	5	2	20	13	+7	17	Playoffs
5	Dallas Trinity FC	11	4	4	3	14	14	0	15	
6	Brooklyn FC	12	3	6	3	13	25	−12	12	

Updated to match(es) played on November 21, 2026. Source: USL Super League
Rules for classification: 1) head-to-head points; 2) total goal differential; 3) total goals scored; 4) disciplinary points; 5) drawing of lots.

==== Matches ====
August 15, 2026 1	Lexington SC	3–0	Brooklyn FC	Lexington SC Stadium
	Barry 58'; McCain 61'; White 82'	Report		Attendance: 3,333; Referee: Iryna Petrunok

August 29, 2026 2	Lexington SC	1–2	DC Power FC	Lexington SC Stadium
	Midgley 90+4'	Report	Abera 45+2'; Colton 67'	Attendance: 4,311; Referee: Patricia McCracken

September 12, 2026 3	Lexington SC	0–1	Carolina Ascent FC	Lexington SC Stadium
		Report	Butler 88'	Attendance: 2,433; Referee: Jaclyn Metz

September 20, 2026 4	Sporting JAX	0–1	Lexington SC	Jacksonville, Florida
5:00 PM ET		Report	Weinert 59'	Stadium: Hodges Stadium; Attendance: 803; Referee: Natalie Simon

September 26, 2026 5	Lexington SC	3–0	Dallas Trinity FC	Lexington SC Stadium
	McCain 56'; Barry 70' 80' (pen.)	Report		Attendance: 2,515; Referee: Alexandra Billeter

October 4, 2026 6	Tampa Bay Sun FC	1–1	Lexington SC	Suncoast Credit Union Field
	Connors 31'	Report	McCain 41'	Attendance: 1,904; Referee: Lauren Aldrich

October 12, 2026 7	Fort Lauderdale United FC	2–1	Lexington SC	Amerant Bank Field
	Gordon 37', 50'	Report	White 86'	Attendance: 918; Referee: John Tamayo

October 18, 2026 8	Lexington SC	2–1	Tampa Bay Sun FC	Lexington SC Stadium
	Barry 73'; Griffith 85'	Report	Dale 15'	Attendance: 3,918; Referee: Laura Rodriguez

October 23, 2026 9	Lexington SC	3–3	Sporting JAX	Lexington, Kentucky
7:30 PM ET	Griffith 11'; Barry 16'; McCain 45'	Report	Puerta 18'; Kenton 45+1'; Brown 85' (o.g.)	Stadium: Lexington SC Stadium; Attendance: 2,466; Referee: Iryna Petrunok

October 31, 2026 10	Carolina Ascent FC	1–0	Lexington SC	American Legion Memorial Stadium
	Moxley 32'	Report		Attendance: 1,417; Referee: Kaitlyn Trowbridge

November 8, 2026 11	DC Power FC	2–1	Lexington SC	Audi Field
	Abera 18'; Colton 90+1'	Report	Barry 90+2'	Attendance: 1,425; Referee: Laadi Issaka

November 14, 2026 12	Lexington SC	4–0	Fort Lauderdale United FC	Lexington SC Stadium
	Barry 20', 82'; White 39'; Pantuso 89'	Report		Attendance: 3,133; Referee: Igor Bych

November 22, 2026 13	Dallas Trinity FC	0–2	Lexington SC	Cotton Bowl
		Report	White 2'; Barry 83'	Attendance: 2,952; Referee: Calin Radosav

November 28, 2026 14	Brooklyn FC	v	Lexington SC

== Transactions ==
=== Transfers in ===
Date	Player	Pos.	Previous club	Fee/notes	Ref.
25 June 2026	(United States) Katie Murray	MF	(United States) Spokane Zephyr FC	Free	
6 July 2026	(United States) Mac Midgley	MF	(United States) Tennessee Volunteers	Free	
9 July 2026	(United States) Marz Josephson	GK	(United States)	Free	

=== Loans in ===
Date	Player	Pos.	Loaned from	Fee/notes	Ref.
16 July 2026	(United States) Ryan Campbell	GK	(United States) Gotham FC	Loan	

=== Transfers out ===
Date	Player	Pos.	Destination club	Fee/notes	Ref.
17 July 2026	(United States) Hannah Sharts	DF			
