= 2026 USL Super League fall season =

USL Super League
- Season: 2026
- Dates: August 15, 2026 – November 28, 2026 (regular season)

The 2026 USL Super League (referred to as USLS) is the third season of the USL Super League, a top division of women's soccer in the United States. Eight teams are competing in the season, which began on August 15, 2026. The 2026 season is abbreviated, with each team playing 14 matches, as the USLS is slated to adopt its first spring-to-fall campaign starting with the 2027 season.

The reigning champions and Players' Shield holders are Lexington SC. Spokane Zephyr FC, which began play in the inaugural USLS season, folded in May 2026, reducing the league back down to eight teams.

== Teams ==
The 2026 USL Super League season features eight teams competing in a 14-match balanced regular season with 7 home and 7 away matches per club. The top four teams advance to the playoffs, culminating in three postseason matches to determine the league champion.

Locations of teams for the 2026 USL Super League season
Current club

=== Stadiums and locations ===
Note: Table lists in alphabetical order.

Team	Location	Stadium	Capacity
Brooklyn FC	Brooklyn, New York	Maimonides Park	7,000
Carolina Ascent FC	Charlotte, North Carolina	American Legion Memorial Stadium	10,500
Dallas Trinity FC	Dallas, Texas	Cotton Bowl Stadium	90,000
DC Power FC	Washington, D.C.	Audi Field	20,000
Fort Lauderdale United FC	Davie, Florida	Beyond Bancard Field	7,000
Lexington SC	Lexington, Kentucky	Lexington SC Stadium	7,500
Sporting Club Jacksonville	Jacksonville, Florida	Hodges Stadium	12,000
Tampa Bay Sun FC	Tampa, Florida	Suncoast Credit Union Field	5,000

=== Personnel and kits ===
Team	Head coach	Captain(s)	Kit manufacturer	Shirt sponsor (front)	Shirt Sponsor (back)	Shirt sponsor (sleeve)	Shorts Sponsor
Brooklyn FC	(United States) Alex Smith	(United States) Breanna Norris	Diaza	Liquid Death	None	TBA	None
Carolina Ascent FC	(England) Philip Poole	(United States) Taylor Porter	Capelli Sport	Nucor	Novant Health	Food Lion	None
Dallas Trinity FC	(United States) Lee Nguyen	(Argentina) Sophia Braun	Nike	None	Relay Human Cloud (2024-25) Trust & Will (2025)	El Rio Grande Latin Market	The Wine Group/Cupcake Vineyards
DC Power FC	(United States) Omid Namazi	(United States) Susanna Fitch	Capelli Sport	Agile Defense	None	None	None
Fort Lauderdale United FC	(England) Tyrone Mears	(United States) Haley Thomas	Nike	Omega XL	La Croix	All Year Cooling	None
Lexington SC	(Japan) Kosuke Kimura	(United States) Taylor Aylmer	Nike	UK HealthCare Sports Medicine	None	None	None
Sporting Club Jacksonville	(England) Stacey Balaam	(United States) Sophie Jones	Adidas	Ascension St. Vincent's	None	None	None
Tampa Bay Sun FC	(Canada) Denise Schilte-Brown	(Canada) Jordyn Listro	Capelli Sport	Tampa General Hospital	None	None	None

=== Managerial changes ===
Team	Outgoing manager	Manner of departure	Date of vacancy	Incoming manager	Date of appointment
Brooklyn FC	(Portugal) Tomás Tengarrinha	Relieved of duties	May 19, 2026	(United States) Alex Smith	July 8, 2026
Fort Lauderdale United FC	(England) Paul Jennison (interim)	End of interim period	June 6, 2026	(England) Tyrone Mears	June 6, 2026
Dallas Trinity FC	(United States) Nathan Thackeray	Relieved of duties	July 2, 2026	(United States) Lee Nguyen	July 2, 2026

== League table ==
Pos	Team	Pld	W	L	T	GF	GA	GD	Pts	Qualification
1	Carolina Ascent FC	12	8	1	3	20	8	+12	27	Playoffs
2	DC Power FC	13	7	3	3	21	12	+9	24	Playoffs
3	Sporting Club Jacksonville	12	4	2	6	25	20	+5	18	Playoffs
4	Lexington SC	12	5	5	2	20	13	+7	17	Playoffs
5	Dallas Trinity FC	11	4	4	3	14	14	0	15	
6	Brooklyn FC	12	3	6	3	13	25	−12	12	
7	Tampa Bay Sun FC	11	2	5	4	11	16	−5	10	
8	Fort Lauderdale United FC	13	2	9	2	7	23	−16	8	

Updated to match(es) played on November 15, 2026. Source: USL Super League
Rules for classification: 1) head-to-head points; 2) total goal differential; 3) total goals scored; 4) disciplinary points; 5) drawing of lots.

== Attendance ==
=== Average home attendances ===
Ranked from highest to lowest average attendance.

Regular season
Rank	Team	GP	Attendance	High	Low	Average
1	Carolina Ascent	6	15,938	5,907	1,417	2,656
2	Lexington	6	18,976	4,311	2,433	3,163
3	Dallas Trinity	6	10,594	2,116	1,449	1,766
4	DC Power	7	9,314	1,519	758	1,331
5	Fort Lauderdale United	6	5,666	1,357	766	944
6	Sporting JAX	5	3,902	908	652	780
7	Brooklyn	5	3,403	768	529	681
8	Tampa Bay Sun	4	8,136	3,140	1,465	2,034
	Total	45	75,929	5,907	529	1,687

Updated through November 11, 2026

Note: Ranked from highest to lowest average attendance

=== Highest attendances ===
Regular season
Rank	Home team	Score	Away team	Attendance	Date	Stadium
1	Carolina Ascent	1–2	Tampa Bay Sun	5,907	August 29, 2026	American Legion Memorial Stadium
2	Lexington	1–2	DC Power	4,311	August 29, 2026	Lexington SC Stadium
3	Lexington	3–0	Brooklyn	3,333	August 15, 2026	Lexington SC Stadium
4	Dallas Trinity	1–1	Tampa Bay Sun	2,041	August 15, 2026	Cotton Bowl
5	DC Power	0–1	Carolina Ascent	1,519	August 15, 2026	Audi Field
6	Dallas Trinity	1–3	Carolina Ascent	1,449	August 22, 2026	Cotton Bowl
7	Fort Lauderdale United	0–1	Sporting JAX	1,357	August 15, 2026	Amerant Bank Field
8	Fort Lauderdale United	3–0	Brooklyn	1,291	August 28, 2026	Amerant Bank Field
9	Sporting JAX	3–2	Tampa Bay Sun	908	August 22, 2026	Hodges Stadium
10	Sporting JAX	2–0	Dallas Trinity	696	August 29, 2026	Hodges Stadium

== Season statistics ==
As of November 15, 2026

=== Goals ===
Rank	Player	Club	Goals
1	(United States) Ashlyn Puerta	Sporting JAX	9
1	(United States) Baylee DeSmit	Sporting JAX	9
3	(United States) Catherine Barry	Lexington	8
4	(Ethiopia) Loza Abera	DC Power	6
5	(United States) Jasmine Hamid	Dallas Trinity	5
5	(United States) Shea Connors	Tampa Bay Sun	5
5	(Puerto Rico) Jill Aguilera	Carolina Ascent	5
5	(United States) Sh'nia Gordon	Fort Lauderdale United	5
9	(United States) Catherine Zimmerman	Brooklyn	4
9	(United States) Seven Castain	Dallas Trinity	4
9	(United States) Addie McCain	Lexington	4
12	(United States) Jackie Richards	Brooklyn	3
12	(United States) Paige Kenton	Sporting JAX	3
12	(United States) Tori Zierenberg	Tampa Bay Sun	3
12	(United States) Hannah White	Lexington	3
12	(United States) Rylee Baisden	Carolina Ascent	3
12	(United States) Emily Colton	DC Power	3
12	(United States) Emma Jaskaniec	DC Power	3
19	(United States) Sarah Griffith	Lexington	2
19	(United States) Tyler Lussi	DC Power	2
19	(United States) Tziarra King	Brooklyn	2
19	(United States) Mia Corbin	Carolina Ascent	2
19	(United States) Onyeka Gamero	Dallas Trinity	2
19	(United States) Carlee Giammona	Brooklyn	2
19	(United States) Audrey Coleman	Carolina Ascent	2
19	(United States) Reese Tappan	Carolina Ascent	2
19	(United States) Shea Groom	Carolina Ascent	2
19	(United States) Tatum Thomason	DC Power	2
29	(England) Eleanor Dale	Tampa Bay Sun	1
29	(United States) Jordan Thompson	Brooklyn	1
29	(United States) Mac Midgley	Lexington	1
29	(United States) Emily Moxley	Carolina Ascent	1
29	(United States) LJ Moore	Dallas Trinity	1
29	(United States) Kalea Eichenberger	Dallas Trinity	1
29	(United States) AJ Hennessey	Sporting JAX	1
29	(United States) Alyssa Walker	DC Power	1
29	(United States) Felicia Knox	Dallas Trinity	1
29	(United States) McKenzie Weinert	Lexington	1
29	(United States) Maggie Illig	Sporting JAX	1
29	(United States) Nicole Vernis	Fort Lauderdale United	1
29	(United States) Riley Parker	Carolina Ascent	1
29	(United States) Jordan Zade	Tampa Bay Sun	1
29	(United States) Kayla Colbert	DC Power	1
29	(United States) Sydny Nasello	Tampa Bay Sun	1
29	(United States) Allison Pantuso	Lexington	1
29	(United States) Ashlyn Miller	Brooklyn	1
29	(Haiti) Claire Constant	DC Power	1
29	(United States) Jenna Butler	Carolina Ascent	1
29	(United States) Sophia Boman	Sporting JAX	1
29	(United States) Abby Boyan	DC Power	1
29	(United States) Abi Hugh	Fort Lauderdale United	1

==== Hat-tricks ====
Player	For	Against	Result	Date
(United States) Ashlyn Puerta	Sporting JAX	Fort Lauderdale United	4–1†	October 16, 2026

† Puerta scored all four goals for Sporting JAX

==== Assists ====
Rank	Player	Club	Assists
1	(United States) Mia Corbin	Carolina Ascent	4
1	(United States) Emily Colton	DC Power	4
2	(United States) Paige Kenton	Sporting JAX	3
2	(United States) Addie McCain	Lexington	3
2	(United States) Jilly Shimkin	Brooklyn	3
2	(Puerto Rico) Jill Aguilera	Carolina Ascent	3
2	(United States) Kiara Locklear	Fort Lauderdale United	3
8	(Ghana) Jennifer Cudjoe	Brooklyn	2
8	(United States) Camryn Lancaster	Dallas Trinity	2
8	(United States) Jordan Zade	Tampa Bay Sun	2
8	(United States) Sydney Cheesman	Dallas Trinity	2
8	(United States) Sydny Nasello	Tampa Bay Sun	2
8	(United States) Allison Pantuso	Lexington	2
8	(United States) Ally Brown	Lexington	2
8	(United States) Alyssa Bourgeois	Lexington	2
8	(United States) Ashlyn Miller	Brooklyn	2
8	(United States) Ashlyn Puerta	Sporting JAX	2
8	(United States) Baylee DeSmit	Sporting JAX	2
8	(United States) Catherine Barry	Lexington	2
8	(United States) Jenna Butler	Carolina Ascent	2
8	(United States) Meg Hughes	Sporting JAX	2
8	(United States) Sophie Jones	Sporting JAX	2
8	(United States) Sam Angel	Carolina Ascent	2
24	(United States) Kaiya Brewer	Dallas Trinity	1
24	(United States) Cat Rapp	Sporting JAX	1
24	(United States) Coco Thistle	Sporting JAX	1
24	(Spain) Andrea Fernández	Sporting JAX	1
24	(United States) Emma Loving	Brooklyn	1
24	(United States) Jamie Shepherd	Dallas Trinity	1
24	(United States) Lauren Gogal	Brooklyn	1
24	(United States) LJ Moore	Dallas Trinity	1
24	(United States) Mak Whitham	DC Power	1
24	(United States) Addisyn Merrick	Carolina Ascent	1
24	(United States) Alyssa Walker	DC Power	1
24	(Canada) Sabrina McNeill	Tampa Bay Sun	1
24	(United States) Sofia Lewis	Brooklyn	1
24	(United States) Regan Steigleder	Lexington	1
24	(United States) Tori Zierenberg	Tampa Bay Sun	1
24	(United States) Catherine Zimmerman	Brooklyn	1
24	(United States) Cyera Hintzen	Dallas Trinity	1
24	(Canada) Jordyn Listro	Tampa Bay Sun	1
24	(Panama) Sofia Cedeño	Dallas Trinity	1
24	(Argentina) Sophia Braun	Dallas Trinity	1
24	(Canada) Vivianne Bessette	Tampa Bay Sun	1
24	(United States) Audrey Coleman	Carolina Ascent	1
24	(United States) Emily Morris	Carolina Ascent	1
24	(United States) Farrah Walters	Fort Lauderdale United	1
24	(United States) Grace Phillpotts	Sporting JAX	1
24	(United States) Hannah Johnson	Lexington	1
24	(United States) Hannah White	Lexington	1
24	(Ethiopia) Loza Abera	DC Power	1
24	(United States) Tatum Thomason	DC Power	1
24	(United States) Abby Boyan	DC Power	1
24	(United States) Jessica Garziano	Brooklyn	1
24	(United States) Abi Hugh	Fort Lauderdale United	1
24	(United States) Darya Rajaee	Lexington	1
24	(United States) Kelsey Oyler	Fort Lauderdale United	1
24	(United States) Mackenzie George	Carolina Ascent	1
24	(United States) Sh'nia Gordon	Fort Lauderdale United	1

=== Clean sheets ===
Rank	Player	Club	Clean Sheets
1	(Puerto Rico) Sydney Martinez	Carolina Ascent	8
2	(United States) Ryan Campbell	Lexington	3
2	(United States) Haley Craig	Fort Lauderdale United	3
4	(Germany) Jamie Gerstenberg	Sporting JAX	2
4	(United States) Breanna Norris	Brooklyn	2
4	(United States) Neeku Purcell	Dallas Trinity	2
4	(United States) Katie Cappelletti	DC Power	2
8	(United States) Marz Josephson	Lexington	1
8	(Puerto Rico) Cristina Roque	Tampa Bay Sun	1

=== Discipline ===
==== Player ====
- Most yellow cards: 4
  - Three players
- Most red cards: 1
  - Taylor Smith

==== Team ====
- Most yellow cards: 21
  - Brooklyn
- Fewest yellow cards: 10
  - Dallas Trinity
  - Lexington
- Most red cards: 1
  - Fort Lauderdale United
- Fewest red cards: 0
  - Seven teams

== Media ==
=== Streaming ===
All regular-season games and all three playoff matches will stream exclusively on Peacock.
