= 2025–26 Lexington SC (women) season =

2025–26 Lexington SC season

Lexington SC
2025–26 season
- Owners: Bill and Donna Shively; Stephen Dawahare
- Head coach: Masaki Hemmi (until December 9, 2025); Kosuke Kimura (from December 9, 2025)
- Stadium: Lexington SC Stadium; Lexington, Kentucky
- All statistics correct as of December 8, 2025.

The 2025–26 Lexington SC season is the club's second season in the USL Super League, in which Lexington is a founding club.

== Season summary ==
On December 9, 2025, Masaki Hemmi was reassigned to Lexington SC, as Kosuke Kimura was promoted to head coach of Lexington SC Women.

By 26 January 2026, Lexington were the only club undefeated in the league.

On 27 January 2026, Kimura announced his coaching squad for the season.

On 29 January 2026, Nicole Vernis was recalled from her loan spell at Lazio.

On 31 May 2026, Lexington SC finished the season as champions after winning the 2026 USL Super League final against Carolina Ascent FC. They became the first Players' Shield champions to complete the league double.

== Staff ==
As of 28 January 2026.

Position	Name	Refs
Head Coach	(Japan) Kosuke Kimura	
Assistant Coach	(United States) Taylor Leach	
Assistant Coach	(United States) Bert Leonard	
Assistant Coach	(United States) Shane O'Neill	
Goalkeeping Coach	(United States) Nate Walzer	
Equipment Manager	(United States) Matthew Thomsen	

== Season squad ==
Squad No.	Name	Nationality	Date of birth (age)
Goalkeepers
1	Sarah Cox	(United States)	February 16, 1994 (31)
26	Kat Asman	(United States)	May 19, 2000 (25)
Defenders
3	Allison Pantuso	(United States)	June 30, 1997 (28)
4	Trinity Watson	(United States)	March 24, 2000 (25)
5	Maddy Perez	(United States)	June 6, 2002 (23)
12	Alyssa Bourgeois	(United States)	May 15, 2002 (23)
19	Hannah Johnson	(United States)	December 27, 2002 (22)
21	Hannah Sharts	(United States)	August 1, 1999 (26)
Midfielders
6	Taylor Aylmer	(United States)	September 23, 1998 (27)
7	Justina Gaynor	(United States)	December 21, 2001 (23)
8	Natalie Higgins	(United States)	
9	Amber Nguyen	(United States)	February 26, 2002 (23)
10	Emina Ekić	(Bosnia and Herzegovina)	June 6, 1999 (26)
17	Tati Fung	(United States)	February 10, 2003 (22)
18	Addie McCain	(United States)	August 28, 1998 (27)
23	Nicole Vernis	(United States)	January 15, 2001 (24)
25	Shea Moyer	(United States)	December 28, 1998 (26)
28	Cassie Rohan	(United States)	February 28, 1998
Forwards
2	Hannah White	(United States)	May 17, 2001 (24)
11	McKenzie Weinert	(United States)	December 2, 1998 (27)
13	Hannah Richardson	(United States)	May 28, 2000 (25)
15	Catherine Barry	(United States)	December 16, 2001 (23)
35	Sarah Griffith	(United States)	April 30, 1999 (26)

== Competitions ==
=== Regular season standings ===
Pos	Team	Pld	W	L	T	GF	GA	GD	Pts	Qualification
1	Lexington (C, S)	28	14	3	11	50	24	+26	53	Playoffs
2	Sporting JAX	28	16	7	5	54	32	+22	53	Playoffs
3	Carolina Ascent	28	15	7	6	39	27	+12	51	Playoffs
4	Dallas Trinity	28	11	10	7	36	40	−4	40	Playoffs
5	Spokane Zephyr	28	10	9	9	34	28	+6	39	

Updated to match(es) played on May 16, 2026. Source: Gainbridge Super League
Rules for classification: 1) head-to-head points; 2) total goal differential; 3) total goals scored; 4) disciplinary points; 5) drawing of lots.
(C) Champions; (S) Players' Shield winner

=== Matches ===
==== August and September ====
August 23, 2025 1	Fort Lauderdale United FC	3–3	Lexington SC	Beyond Bancard Field
	Rajaee 17'; Hamid (yellow card) 30' (goal) 90+1' (.pen); Locklear (yellow card) 37' (goal) 57'	Report	Barry (yellow card) 28'; Bourgeois (yellow card) 45'; McCain 63'; Weinert 69'; Pantuso 87'	Attendance: 2,946; Referee: Lauren Aldrich

September 7, 2025 2	Lexington SC	2–0	Brooklyn FC	Lexington SC Stadium
	Barry 35', 39'; Moyer (yellow card) 80'; Johnson (yellow card) 84' (red card)	Report	Breslin (yellow card) 9'; Freitas (yellow card) 66'; Marković (yellow card) 72'	Attendance: 2,433; Referee: Gloria Martinez

September 12, 2025 3	DC Power FC	0–0	Lexington SC	Audi Field
	Gilbert (yellow card) 26'	Report	Aylmer (yellow card) 19'; Perez (yellow card) 28'	Attendance: 2,054; Referee: Kaitlyn Trowbridge

September 20, 2025 4	Lexington SC	0–0	Spokane Zephyr FC	Lexington SC Stadium
	Ekić (yellow card) 12'	Report	Cook (yellow card) 17'; Knox (yellow card) 32'	Attendance: 2,003; Referee: Stephanie McFarland

September 26, 2025 5	Lexington SC	6–1	Dallas Trinity FC	Lexington SC Stadium
	Barry 9', 27'; McCain 21', 77'; Aylmer (yellow card) 45+1'; Johnson (yellow card) 45+3'; Ekić 71'; Moyer (yellow card) 88' (goal) 90+1'; Fung (yellow card) 90+2'	Report	Strawn 24'; Guidry (yellow card) 48' (red card)	Attendance: 1,410; Referee: Jamie Padilla

==== October ====
October 4, 2025 6	Spokane Zephyr FC	0–0	Lexington SC	One Spokane Stadium
	Tappan (yellow card) 63'	Report	Barry (yellow card) 11'; Bourgeois (yellow card) 29'; Ekić (yellow card) 55'; Pantuso (yellow card) 60'	Attendance: 1,624; Referee: Iryna Petrunok

October 10, 2025 7	Lexington SC	1–1	Carolina Ascent FC	Lexington, Kentucky
	McCain (yellow card) 53' (goal) 90+7'	Report	Baisden (yellow card) 58'; Harding 72'; Studer (yellow card) 75'; Martinez (yellow card) 89'	Stadium: Lexington SC Stadium; Attendance: 1,711; Referee: Jaclyn Metz

October 16, 2025 8	Lexington SC	5–1	Fort Lauderdale United FC	Lexington SC Stadium
	Moyer 17'; Griffith 25', 43'; McCain 67'; Fung (yellow card) 73'; Barry 78'	Report	Bella Hara (red card); Hamid (yellow card) 71'; McCarthy 81'	Attendance: 2,233; Referee: Rachel Swett

October 31, 2025 9	Lexington SC	4–2	Sporting JAX	Lexington SC Stadium
	Griffith 17'; Ekić 51'; Barry 73'; Moyer 90'	Report	Kenton 79'; Puerta 90+6'	Attendance: 1,732; Referee: Elvis Osmanovic

==== November ====
November 15, 2025 10	Brooklyn FC	0–2	Lexington SC	Maimonides Park
		Report	Weinert 12'; McCain 20'	Attendance: 796; Referee: Thomas Snyder

November 22, 2025 11	Tampa Bay Sun FC	1–1	Lexington SC	Suncoast Credit Union Arena
	McNeill 14'; Flint (yellow card) 32'; Listro (yellow card) 52'; Bessette (yellow card) 90'	Report	Barry 12'; McCain (yellow card) 27'; Sharts (yellow card) 45'; Fung (yellow card) 54'; Weinert (yellow card) 69'; Johnson (yellow card) 71'	Attendance: 2,135; Referee: Danielle Chesky

==== December ====
December 6, 2025 12	Lexington SC	1–1	Spokane Zephyr FC	Lexington SC Stadium
	McCain 89' (.pen)	Report	Jaskaniec 61'; Braun (yellow card) 77'	Attendance: 1,911; Referee: Elvis Osmanovic

December 13, 2025 13	Lexington SC	2–2	DC Power FC	Lexington SC Stadium
	Aylmer 40'; Weinert 70'	Report	Gourley 21', 45+1'; Cummings (yellow card) 25'	Attendance: 1,323; Referee: Jamie Padilla

December 20, 2025 14	Dallas Trinity FC	1–1	Lexington SC	Cotton Bowl
	Ubogagu 52'; Strawn (yellow card) 83'	Report	Pantuso 28'; Weinert (yellow card) 45+1'; Sharts (yellow card) 49'; Emina Ekić (penalty missed)	Attendance: 2,204; Referee: Atahan Yaya

==== January and February ====
January 31, 2026 15	Fort Lauderdale United FC	1–3	Lexington SC	Beyond Bancard Field
	Hamid 80'	Report	Weinert 8' (yellow card) 53'; Barry 26', 58'	Attendance: 1,684; Referee: John Tamayo

February 7, 2026 16	Carolina Ascent FC	1–2	Lexington SC	American Legion Memorial Stadium
	Parker 36'; Aguilera (yellow card) 73'; Baisden (yellow card) 81'	Report	Weinert (yellow card) 12' (goal) 52'; Bourgeois 43'	Attendance: 1,703; Referee: Joe Surgan

February 21, 2026 17	Lexington SC	0–3	Sporting JAX	Lexington SC Stadium
	Bourgeois (yellow card) 52'; Griffith (yellow card) 71'; Aylmer (yellow card) 89'	Report	Smekrud 31'; DeSmit 45'; Puerta 53'	Attendance: 1,707; Referee: Nabil Bensalah

==== March ====
March 8, 2026 18	Lexington SC	0–1	Dallas Trinity FC	Lexington SC Stadium
	Brown (yellow card) 39'	Report	Swann (yellow card) 80'; Guidry (yellow card) 86'; Stainbrook 90+3'	Attendance: 1,818; Referee: Kyle Johnston

March 19, 2026 19	Dallas Trinity FC	2–2	Lexington SC	Cotton Bowl
	Missimo 55'; Flynn 79'	Report	Bourgeois 26'; Griffith (yellow card) 42'; Barry 90+3'	Attendance: 3,651; Referee: Muhammad Kaleia

March 21, 2026 20	Lexington SC	2–0	Fort Lauderdale United FC	Lexington SC Stadium
	Rajaee 48'; Griffith 82' (pen.); Weinert (yellow card) 83'	Report	González (yellow card) 43'; Gordon (yellow card) 82'; Locklear (yellow card) 89'	Attendance: 2,389; Referee: Jamie Padilla

March 28, 2026 21	Brooklyn FC	0–1	Lexington SC	Maimonides Park
		Report	Weinert 8'; McCain (yellow card) 76' (yellow-red card) 90+7'	Attendance: 1,034; Referee: Laadi Issaka

==== April ====
April 2, 2026 22	DC Power FC	0–2	Lexington SC	Audi Field
		Report	Barry 49', 87'	Attendance: 1,129; Referee: Jorge Escobar

April 12, 2026 23	Carolina Ascent FC	1–0	Lexington SC	American Legion Memorial Stadium
	Morris 72'	Report		Attendance: 5,189; Referee: Kelsey Harms

April 18, 2026 24	Lexington SC	4–0	Tampa Bay Sun FC	Lexington SC Stadium
	Weinert 20'; Barry 49', 50', 64'	Report	Nasello (penalty missed)	Attendance: 2,611; Referee: Lauren Aldrich

April 26, 2026 25	Sporting JAX	1–2	Lexington SC	Hodges Stadium
	Puerta 31' (pen.)	Report	McCain 19'; Weinert 35'	Attendance: 8,744; Referee: Laura Rodriguez

==== May ====
May 3, 2026 26	Spokane Zephyr FC	0–0	Lexington SC	One Spokane Stadium
		Report		Attendance: 1,742; Referee: Justin St.Pierre

May 10, 2026 27	Lexington SC	3–1	Brooklyn FC	Lexington SC Stadium
	Weinert 39', 45'; Barry 44'	Report	Cooke 69'	Attendance: 2,111; Referee: Shawn Tehini

May 16, 2026 28	Lexington SC	1–0	Tampa Bay Sun FC	Lexington SC Stadium
	McCain 90' (pen.)	Report		Attendance: 5,187; Referee: Alejo Calume

=== Playoffs ===
May 23, 2026	Lexington SC	2–0	Dallas Trinity	Lexington, Kentucky
5:00 PM ET	Griffith 40'; Barry 51'	Report		Stadium: Lexington SC Stadium; Attendance: 3,235; Referee: Lauren Aldrich

May 30, 2026	Lexington SC	3–1 (a.e.t.)	Carolina Ascent	Lexington, Kentucky
7:00 PM ET	Weinert 72'; Steigleder 86'; McCain 104'	Report	Corbin 45+1'	Stadium: Lexington SC Stadium; Attendance: 7,715; Referee: Shawn Tehini

== Statistics ==
=== Appearances ===
Numbers outside parentheses denote appearances as starter.
Numbers in parentheses denote appearances as substitute.

Players with no appearances are not included on the list, italics indicate a loaned in player

As of match played

No.	Nat.	Player	Regular Season	Total
Goalkeepers
1	(United States)	Sarah Cox	0	0
26	(United States)	Kat Asman	0	0
Defenders
3	(United States)	Allison Pantuso	0	0
5	(United States)	Maddy Perez	0	0
12	(United States)	Alyssa Bourgeois	0	0
19	(United States)	Hannah Johnson	0	0
21	(United States)	Hannah Sharts	0	0
Midfielders
6	(United States)	Taylor Aylmer	0	0
8	(United States)	Natalie Higgins	0	0
9	(United States)	Amber Nguyen	0	0
10	(Bosnia and Herzegovina)	Emina Ekić	0	0
17	(United States)	Tati Fung	0	0
18	(United States)	Addie McCain	0	0
23	(United States)	Nicole Vernis	0	0
25	(United States)	Shea Moyer	0	0
28	(United States)	Cassie Rohan	0	0
Forwards
2	(United States)	Hannah White	0	0
2	(United States)	McKenzie Weinert	0	0
15	(United States)	Catherine Barry	0	0
35	(United States)	Sarah Griffith	0	0
Other (departed during the season)
4	(United States)	Trinity Watson	0	0
7	(United States)	Justina Gaynor	0	0
13	(United States)	Hannah Richardson	0	0

== Transactions ==
=== Contract operations ===
Date	Player	Pos.	Notes	Ref.
July 5, 2025	(United States) Sarah Cox	GK	Re-signed through the 2025–26 season.	
September 8, 2025	(United States) Catherine Barry	FW	Re-signed through the 2026–27 season.	
December 2, 2025	(United States) Hannah Sharts	DF	2026–27 contract option activated.	
January 29, 2026	(United States) Justina Gaynor	MF	Contract termination, joined DC Power FC	
January 29, 2026	(United States) Hannah Richardson	FW	Contract termination, joined DC Power FC	
February 6, 2026	(United States) Trinity Watson	DF	Contract termination	
February 18, 2026	(United States) Sarah Griffith	FW	Contract extension through the 2026–27 season.	
February 18, 2026	(United States) Hannah White	FW	Contract extension through the 2026–27 season.	

=== Loans in ===
Date	Player	Pos.	Loaned from	Fee/notes	Ref.
July 2, 2025	(United States) Kat Asman	GK	(United States) Orlando Pride	Loaned through June 2026.	
July 2, 2025	(Argentina) Mariana Larroquette	FW	(United States) Orlando Pride	Loaned through the end of the 2025 NWSL season.	

=== Loans out ===
Date	Player	Pos.	Loaned to	Fee/notes	Ref.
July 25, 2025	(United States) Nicole Vernis	MF	(Italy) SS Lazio		

=== Transfers in ===
Date	Player	Pos.	Previous club	Fee/notes	Ref.
June 30, 2025	(United States) Alyssa Bourgeois	DF	(United States) Spokane Zephyr FC	Transfer	
June 30, 2025	(United States) McKenzie Weinert	FW	(United States) Spokane Zephyr FC	Transfer	
June 30, 2025	(United States) Allison Pantuso	DF	(United States) Brooklyn FC	Free agent	
July 1, 2025	(United States) Tati Fung	MF	(United States) Fort Lauderdale United FC	Free agent	
July 1, 2025	(United States) Hannah Sharts	DF	(Portugal) Racing Power FC	Free agent	
July 1, 2025	(United States) Catherine Barry	FW	(United States) Chicago Stars FC	Free agent	
July 1, 2025	(United States) Amber Nguyen	MF	(United States) North Carolina Courage	Free agent	
July 2, 2025	(United States) Hannah Johnson	DF	(United States) Angel City FC	Free agent	
July 2, 2025	(United States) Cassie Rohan	MF	(Sweden) Sundsvalls DFF	Free agent	
July 2, 2025	(United States) Taylor Aylmer	MF	(United States) Spokane Zephyr FC	Free agent	
July 7, 2025	(United States) Addie McCain	MF	(United States) Fort Lauderdale United FC	Transfer in exchange for a USL Super League record fee.	
July 8, 2025	(United States) Justina Gaynor	MF	(United States) Chicago Stars FC	Free agent	
July 18, 2025	(Bosnia and Herzegovina) Emina Ekić	MF	(United States) Spokane Zephyr FC	Transfer	
July 31, 2025	(United States) Sarah Griffith	FW	(United States) Chicago Stars FC	Free agent	
January 8, 2026	(United States) Regan Steigleder	DF	(United States) Kansas City Current	Free agent	
January 22, 2026	(United States) Ally Brown	DF	(United States) University of Tennessee	Free agent	
January 28, 2026	(United States) Gracie Falla	DF	(United States) University of Southern California	Will join the club in July	
February 12, 2026	(United States) Darya Rajaee	MF	(United States) Fort Lauderdale United FC	Free agent	

=== Transfers out ===
Date	Player	Pos.	Destination club	Fee/notes	Ref.
June 25, 2025	(United States) JJ Aalbue	FW		Out of contract.	
June 25, 2025	(United States) Kate Doyle	FW		Out of contract.	
June 25, 2025	(United States) Courtney Jones	FW		Out of contract.	
June 25, 2025	(United States) Elysia Laramie	FW		Out of contract.	
June 25, 2025	(United States) Julie Mackin	DF	(United States) Greenville Liberty SC	Out of contract.	
June 25, 2025	(United States) Marykate McGuire	FW		Out of contract.	
June 25, 2025	(United States) Libby Moore	MF		Out of contract.	
June 25, 2025	(United States) Madi Parsons	FW	(United States) Tampa Bay Sun FC	Out of contract.	
June 25, 2025	(United States) Sydney Shepherd	DF	(Portugal) Rio Ave	Out of contract.	
June 25, 2025	(United States) Bridgette Skiba	GK	(Iceland) Stjarnan	Out of contract.	
June 25, 2025	(United States) Cori Sullivan	FW		Out of contract.	
June 25, 2025	(United States) Taiana Tolleson	GK	(Greece) Agia Paraskevi	Out of contract.	
June 25, 2025	(United States) Autumn Weeks	DF	(Greece) Odysseas Moschatou	Out of contract.	
June 25, 2025	(United States) Claire Winter	MF		Out of contract.	
June 25, 2025	(New Zealand) Grace Wisnewski	MF	(Denmark) FC Nordsjælland	Out of contract.	
