= 2026 USL Super League final =

Soccer championship game in Kentucky, US

- Event: USL Super League final
Lexington SC	Carolina Ascent FC
3	1
- Date: May 30, 2026
- Venue: Lexington SC Stadium, Lexington, Kentucky, U.S.
- MVP: Regan Steigleder (Lexington SC)
- Referee: Shawn Tehini
- Attendance: 7,715

The 2026 USL Super League final was the championship match of the 2025–26 season of the USL Super League, a top-division professional soccer league in the United States. It was contested between Lexington SC and Carolina Ascent FC at Lexington SC Stadium on May 30, 2026. Lexington won the match 3–1, becoming the first Players' Shield champions to complete the league double.

== Road to the final ==
=== Lexington SC ===
After finishing last in the league in their inaugural season, Lexington SC turned their fortunes around in their second year and won the USL Super League Players' Shield with the best record in the league. The club hired a new head coach before the season, Masaki Hemmi, but he moved to the club's men's side during the winter break and was replaced by his former assistant Kosuke Kimura. Offensively, the club was led by new signings including McKenzie Weinert, Addie McCain, Sarah Griffith, and Catherine Barry, who burst onto the professional scene and won the USL Super League Golden Boot. In the playoff semifinals, Lexington SC won 2–0 over Dallas Trinity FC with goals from Griffith and Barry to advance to their first league championship game.

=== Carolina Ascent ===
After winning the Players' Shield in their inaugural season, Carolina Ascent FC finished their second year in third place in the league, ending the campaign on a six-game win streak and eleven-game undefeated streak. In the playoff semifinals, the Ascent won 1–0 against expansion club Sporting JAX on an early goal from Mackenzie George, reaching their first league title game.

== Match ==
=== Details ===
May 30, 2026
7:00 PM EDT

Lexington SC	3–1 (a.e.t.)	Carolina Ascent
Weinert 72'; Stegleder 96'; McCain 104'	Report	Corbin 45+1'

Lexington SC Stadium, Lexington, Kentucky, U.S.
Attendance: 7,715
Referee: Shawn Tehini

Lexington SC

GK	26	(United States) Kat Asman		
LB	16	(United States) Ally Brown		
CB	22	(United States) Regan Steigleder		
CB	3	(United States) Allison Pantuso		
RB	12	(United States) Alyssa Bourgeois	(yellow card) 52'	
CM	6	(United States) Taylor Aylmer (c)		
CM	20	(United States) Darya Rajaee		(substituted off) 91'
LW	11	(United States) McKenzie Weinert		(substituted off) 90+1'
FW	18	(United States) Addie McCain		(substituted off) 110'
FW	15	(United States) Catherine Barry		(substituted off) 90+1'
RW	13	(United States) Sarah Griffith		(substituted off) 101'
Substitutes:
GK	1	(United States) Sarah Cox		
FW	2	(United States) Hannah White	(yellow card) 116'	(substituted on) 90+1'
MF	9	(United States) Amber Nguyen		(substituted on) 90+1' (substituted off) 117'
DF	13	(United States) McKenzie Hawkins		
MF	17	(United States) Tati Fung		(substituted on) 91'
DF	19	(United States) Hannah Johnson		(substituted on) 110'
DF	21	(United States) Hannah Sharts		(substituted on) 117'
MF	23	(United States) Nicole Vernis		(substituted on) 101'
Manager:
(Japan) Kosuke Kimura

Carolina Ascent FC

GK	15	(Puerto Rico) Sydney Martinez		
LB	7	(Puerto Rico) Jill Aguilera (c)		(substituted off) 105'
CB	19	(United States) Meaghan Nally		
CB	5	(United States) Jenna Butler	(yellow card) 61'	
RB	13	(United States) Addisyn Merrick		(substituted off) 101'
CM	28	(United States) Lily Nabet		(substituted off) 77'
CM	9	(United States) Mia Corbin		(substituted off) 77'
LW	17	(United States) Tyler Lussi		(substituted off) 77'
FW	20	(United States) Shea Groom		(substituted off) 101'
FW	31	(United States) Mackenzie George		
RW	23	(United States) Riley Parker		
Substitutes:
GK	1	(United States) Meagan McClelland		
DF	2	(United States) Brianna Martinez		(substituted on) 105'
FW	4	(United States) Ava Cook		(substituted on) 101'
DF	8	(United States) Emily Moxley		(substituted on) 101'
MF	14	(United States) Taylor Porter	(yellow card) 98'	(substituted on) 77'
FW	18	(United States) Audrey Coleman		(substituted on) 77'
MF	22	(United States) Emily Morris	(yellow card) 90+3'	(substituted on) 77'
Manager:
(England) Philip Poole

Most Valuable Player
(United States) Regan Steigleder
Assistant referees
Jessica Carnevale (United States)
Zeno Cho (United States)
Fourth official
Laura Rodriguez (United States)

Match rules

- 90 minutes
- 30 minutes of extra time if necessary.
- Penalty shootout if scores still level.
