= Hope Hisey =

American soccer player (born 2001)

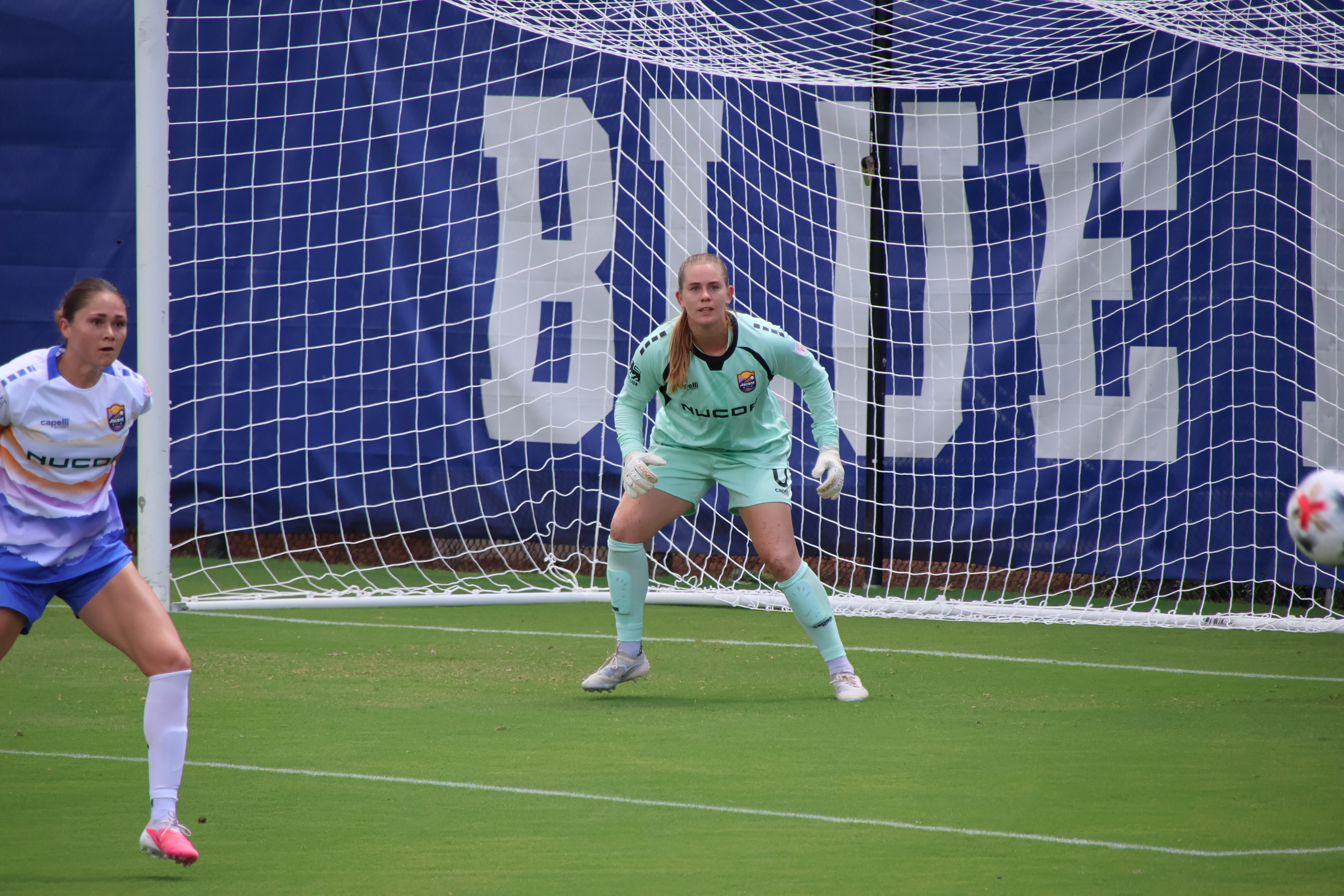
- Hisey with the Carolina Ascent in 2026

Personal information
- Full name: Hope Hisey
- Date of birth: June 26, 2001 (age 25)
- Place of birth: Tucson, Arizona, United States
- Height: 5 ft 9 in (1.75 m)
- Position: Goalkeeper

Team information
- Current team: Carolina Ascent
- Number: 0

Youth career
- FC Tucson
- 2018: Canyon del Oro Dorados

College career
Years	Team	Apps	(Gls)
2019–2023	Arizona Wildcats	87	(0)

Senior career*
Years	Team	Apps	(Gls)
2018–2022	FC Tucson	–	(–)
2024	Kansas City Current	0	(0)
2024–2026	Spokane Zephyr	49	(0)
2026–	Carolina Ascent	0	(0)
- * Club domestic league appearances and goals as of 22:57, May 18, 2026 (UTC)

Hope Hisey (born June 26, 2001) is an American professional soccer player who plays as a goalkeeper for USL Super League club Carolina Ascent. A two-time USL Super League Goalkeeper of the Year, she previously played for the Spokane Zephyr. She played college soccer for the Arizona Wildcats was selected by the Kansas City Current in the fourth round of the 2024 NWSL Draft.

== Early life ==
Hisey grew up in Tucson, Arizona. Hisey began playing soccer at age eight. She attended Canyon Del Oro High School in Oro Valley, Arizona, where she captained the soccer team and was named all-state in her senior year. She played club soccer for FC Tucson.

== College career ==
Hisey became the full-time starting keeper for the Arizona Wildcats during her freshman season in 2019, recording 9 clean sheets in 17 games and earning Pac-12 Conference all-freshman honors. Arizona qualified for NCAA tournament, winning one round in a shutout. She started all 15 games and kept 7 clean sheets in the 2020 season, which was postponed to the spring because of the COVID-19 pandemic.

Before the 2021 season, new head coach Becca Moros asked Hisey to practice using her feet and become involved in build-play for the first time. She played every minute of her junior season and made a career-high 102 saves but was only able to keep one shutout in 18 games. In the 2022 season, she was named to the All-Pac-12 third team, making 61 saves to keep 6 clean sheets in 18 games. The following summer, she trained with the Kansas City Current, who would later draft her. In the 2023 season, using her fifth year of eligibility granted to athletes because of the pandemic, she made 77 saves for 4 shutouts in 19 games. She saved three penalty kicks within the first eight games of the season. She left Arizona as the all-time leader in career saves (366) and second in shutouts (24).

== Club career ==
=== Kansas City Current ===
Hisey was drafted 46th overall by the Kansas City Current in the fourth round of the 2024 NWSL Draft. She was the Current's second goalkeeper selection in the draft after Halle Mackiewicz, who went in the third round. She was signed to a one-year contract, as the third-choice goalkeeper behind Adrianna Franch and Jordan Silkowitz. On August 2, she was waived by the Current as the club signed new starter Almuth Schult.

=== Spokane Zephyr ===
On August 14, 2024, USL Super League club Spokane Zephyr announced that they had signed Hisey before the league's inaugural season. After six games on the bench, she won the starting job over Izzy Nino and made her professional debut in a 1–0 win over the Tampa Bay Sun on October 27. Despite posting just two wins by the winter break, the Zephyr rallied in the spring and finished fifth in the league, missing the playoffs on tiebreakers. Hisey led the league with 9 clean sheets (tied with Madison White) in 21 games. She also led the league in saves and ranked second with 1.0 goals against average. She was named the USL Super League Goalkeeper of the Year and earned first-team All-League honors.

On August 8, 2025, the Zephyr announced that Hisey would return to the club for their second season. She became the first USL Super League goalkeeper to record 10 career clean sheets after a 2–0 win over the Tampa Bay Sun on September 13. On October 12, she became the league's first goalkeeper to reach 100 career saves during a 2–0 win over the Dallas Trinity. Starting all 28 matches, she again led the league in saves and tied for second with 10 shutouts (behind Kat Asman). In the Zephyr's final game, she kept a clean sheet in a 4–0 win over Brooklyn FC as the club missed the playoffs again by one point on the final day of the season. She was named the USL Super League Goalkeeper of the Year and first-team All-League for the second consecutive season, and was named Zephyr of the Year by her club. However, with low attendance and high travel costs, the Zephyr folded after their second season.

=== Carolina Ascent ===
On July 8, 2026, it was announced that Hisey had signed with fellow USL Super League club Carolina Ascent alongside former Zephyr teammate Reese Tappan.

== Personal life ==
Hisey is the daughter of Jason Hisey and Faith Trippett, both of whom graduated from the University of Arizona. Her father played minor league baseball as a pitcher and was formerly the head baseball coach at Pima Community College. Hisey excelled academically at the University of Arizona, graduating summa cum laude with a 4.0 grade point average (GPA) and being named the Pac-12 Women's Soccer Scholar-Athlete of the Year in 2023.

== Honors and awards ==
Individual

- USL Super League Goalkeeper of the Year: 2024–25, 2025–26
- USL Super League All-League First Team: 2024–25, 2025–26
- Zephyr of the Year: 2025–26
- Third-team All-Pac-12: 2022
- Pac-12 all-freshman team: 2019
