= Catherine Barry =

American soccer player (born 2001)

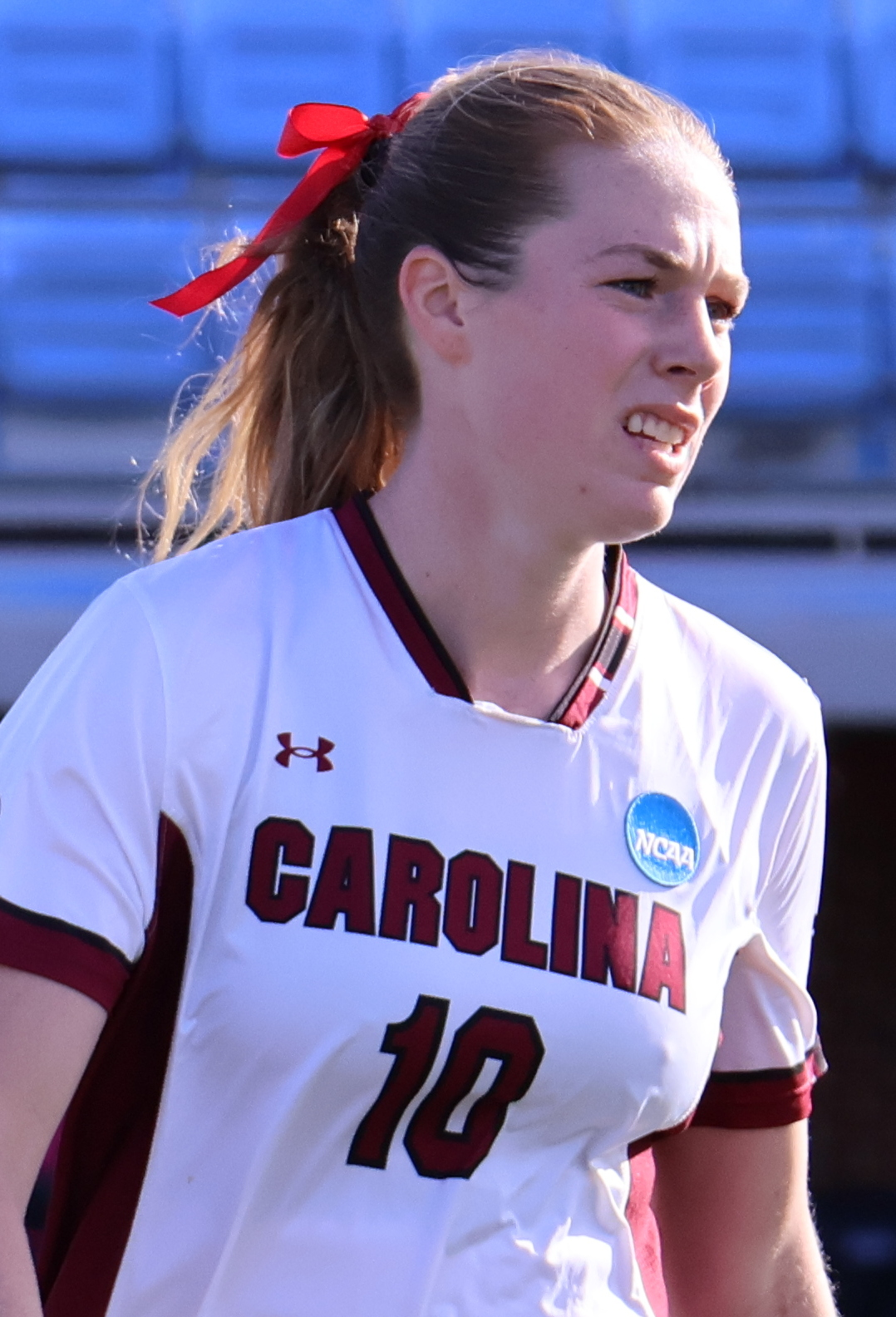
- Barry with South Carolina in 2024

Personal information
- Full name: Catherine Noelle Barry
- Date of birth: December 16, 2001 (age 24)
- Height: 6 ft 0 in (1.83 m)
- Position: Forward

Team information
- Current team: Lexington SC
- Number: 15

Youth career
- NEFC

College career
Years	Team	Apps	(Gls)
2020–2024	South Carolina Gamecocks	101	(51)

Senior career*
Years	Team	Apps	(Gls)
2025	Chicago Stars	4	(0)
2025–	Lexington SC	40	(24)

International career^{‡}
2019	United States U-20	2	(0)
- * Club domestic league appearances and goals as of November 13, 2026 ‡ National team caps and goals as of December 13, 2019

Catherine Noelle Barry (born December 16, 2001) is an American professional soccer player who plays as a forward for USL Super League club Lexington SC. She played college soccer for the South Carolina Gamecocks, setting the program record for career goals (51) and earning All-American honors twice. After a brief stint with the Chicago Stars, she joined Lexington SC and won the USL Super League title in 2026. She claimed the USL Super League Golden Boot in her debut season and soon became the top scorer in league history.

== Early life ==
Barry was raised in Hingham, Massachusetts, one of four children born to Lauren and Christopher Barry. She played multiple sports during high school at Tabor Academy, lettering in soccer, lacrosse, and basketball. In her junior year, she helped the basketball team reach the NEPSAC championship game, losing to the Worcester Academy team led by future South Carolina star Aliyah Boston. She became the soccer team's all-time top scorer with 88 goals, leading them to the NEPSAC Class B championship in 2018. She was twice named both NEPSAC Player of the Year and the Massachusetts Gatorade Player of the Year. she played DA club soccer for NEFC (previously the Boston Breakers Academy). Rated a four-star prospect by TopDrawerSoccer, she committed to South Carolina as a sophomore.

== College career ==
Barry's freshman season with the South Carolina Gamecocks was shortened due to the COVID-19 pandemic. She was an immediate starter in 2020, leading the team in scoring with 6 goals and 4 assists in 16 games; she would be the team's top scorer all five years in college. She scored 8 goals with 3 assists in 18 games in her sophomore season, including one goal and one assist during South Carolina's run to the NCAA tournament quarterfinals. In her junior season in 2022, she set then career highs with 10 goals and 7 assists in 24 games, earning first-team All-SEC honors. She helped lead South Carolina to the program's third SEC tournament title, scoring twice at the tournament and assisting the only goal against Alabama in the final. She scored three times at the NCAA tournament to help the Gamecocks reach the third round.

Barry playing for South Carolina in 2024

Barry became one of South Carolina's team captains in her senior year in 2023. She scored 9 goals with 5 assists in 21 games and was named first-team All-SEC and third-team All-American by United Soccer Coaches. She chose to use her fifth year of eligibility (granted because of the pandemic) in 2024, scoring 18 goals in 22 games. She broke both the program records for single-season goals (set by Savannah McCaskill in 2017) and career goals (held by Jennie Ondo Lloyd), finishing her career with 51 goals in 101 appearances. She also had 8 assists that year and repeated her first-team All-SEC and third-team All-American selections.

== Club career ==
=== Chicago Stars ===
Barry joined the Chicago Stars as a non-roster trialist in the National Women's Soccer League (NWSL) preseason in January 2025. On March 13, the club announced they had signed Barry to her first professional contract on a roster relief deal. She made her professional debut the next day as a late substitute in the season-opening 6–0 loss to the Orlando Pride. On April 10, she signed a new short-term contract through June. She made 4 appearances for the club.

=== Lexington SC ===
On July 1, 2025, Barry signed a one-year contract with USL Super League club Lexington SC. She made her club debut and first professional start in a season-opening 3–3 draw with Fort Lauderdale United. The following game, on September 7, she scored her first professional goals in her home debut at Lexington SC Stadium, netting twice in a 2–0 win over Brooklyn FC. The next day, Lexington announced a new two-year contract for Barry until the summer of 2027. On November 22, she scored in a 1–1 draw with the Tampa Bay Sun as Lexington broke the league record for consecutive games unbeaten (12, dating back to the previous season). On February 7, 2026, she assisted McKenzie Weinert in a 2–1 win over the Carolina Ascent as the streak reached 17 games (where it would end).

On April 1, 2026, Barry's second goal in a 2–0 win over DC Power FC – chipping the keeper from 40 yards (37 m) out – vaulted her into the Golden Boot lead over Ashlyn Puerta. Two weeks later, she scored her first professional hat trick in a playoff-clinching 4–0 victory over the Tampa Bay Sun, breaking the league record for goals in a season (15) previously set by Allie Thornton in the inaugural campaign (13). She finished the season with a record 16 goals in 28 games (and 4 assists – making a record 20 goal contributions) and was integral to Lexington's worst-to-first resurgence from the previous season to win the Players' Shield. She earned first-team All-League honors, placed second in the voting for Player of the Year behind Ashlyn Puerta, and was named the USLPA (players' association) Player of the Year. In the playoffs, she scored the second goal in a 2–0 win over the Dallas Trinity in the semifinals, then assisted McKenzie Weinert's equalizer in a 3–1 win over the Carolina Ascent in the final, making Lexington the first team to complete the league double.

On November 13, 2026, Barry scored twice in a 4–0 win over Fort Lauderdale United to reach 24 career regular-season goals, overtaking teammate Addie McCain to become the top scorer in USL Super League history.

== International career ==
Barry appeared in two friendlies for the United States national under-20 team in December 2019.

== Honors and awards ==
South Carolina Gamecocks

- SEC women's soccer tournament: 2022

Lexington SC

- USL Super League: 2025–26
- USL Super League Players' Shield: 2025–26

Individual

- USL Super League Golden Boot: 2025–26
- USL Super League All-League First Team: 2025–26
- USLPA Player of the Year: 2025–26
- Third-team All-American: 2023, 2024
- First-team All-SEC: 2022, 2023, 2024
- SEC all-freshman team: 2020
- SEC tournament all-tournament team: 2020, 2022
