= Kat Asman =

American soccer player (born 2000)

- Asman with the Denver Summit in 2026

Personal information
- Full name: Katherine Grace Asman
- Date of birth: May 19, 2000 (age 26)
- Place of birth: Roswell, Georgia, United States
- Height: 5 ft 10 in (1.78 m)
- Position: Goalkeeper

Youth career
- Tophat SC

College career
Years	Team	Apps	(Gls)
2018–2023	Penn State Nittany Lions	87	(0)

Senior career*
Years	Team	Apps	(Gls)
2024	Portland Thorns	0	(0)
2025–2026	Orlando Pride	0	(0)
2025–2026	→ Lexington SC (loan)	28	(0)
2026	→ Denver Summit (loan)	3	(0)
- * Club domestic league appearances and goals as of November 1, 2026

Katherine Grace Asman (born May 19, 2000) is an American professional soccer player who plays as a goalkeeper. She played college soccer for the Penn State Nittany Lions and was drafted by the Portland Thorns in the third round of the 2024 NWSL Draft. She then joined the Orlando Pride, where she played on loan for USL Super League club Lexington SC, earning the Golden Glove Award in their championship-winning season in 2026.

== Early life ==
Asman was born and raised in Roswell, Georgia. She began playing in goal around the age of eight or nine. She attended Roswell High School and played club soccer for Tophat Soccer Club.

== College career ==
After redshirting her freshman year, Asman played occasionally as an understudy to Amanda Dennis in 2019. She made 63 saves and kept 6 clean sheets in 15 starts in the 2020 season (pushed to spring 2021 because of the COVID-19 pandemic), helping win the Big Ten tournament and make the NCAA third round. She became Penn State's first-choice goalkeeper during her redshirt junior season in fall 2021, making 63 saves with 3 shutouts in 21 games. She made a career-high 11 saves in a 2–2 draw against USC in the NCAA tournament second round, where Penn State advanced on penalties.

Asman made a career-high 84 saves and kept 9 clean sheets in 23 games in the 2022 season, helping win another Big Ten championship where she was named defensive player of the tournament. In her sixth and final year in State College, she made 83 saves and kept 12 clean sheets (including 3 combined) in 23 games in the 2023 season. She conceded only 14 goals and led the Big Ten in goals against average (0.642), earning second-team All-Big Ten honors. One of the team's captains for 2023, she helped win two shutouts in four games as Penn State reached the quarterfinals of the NCAA tournament.

== Club career ==
=== Portland Thorns ===
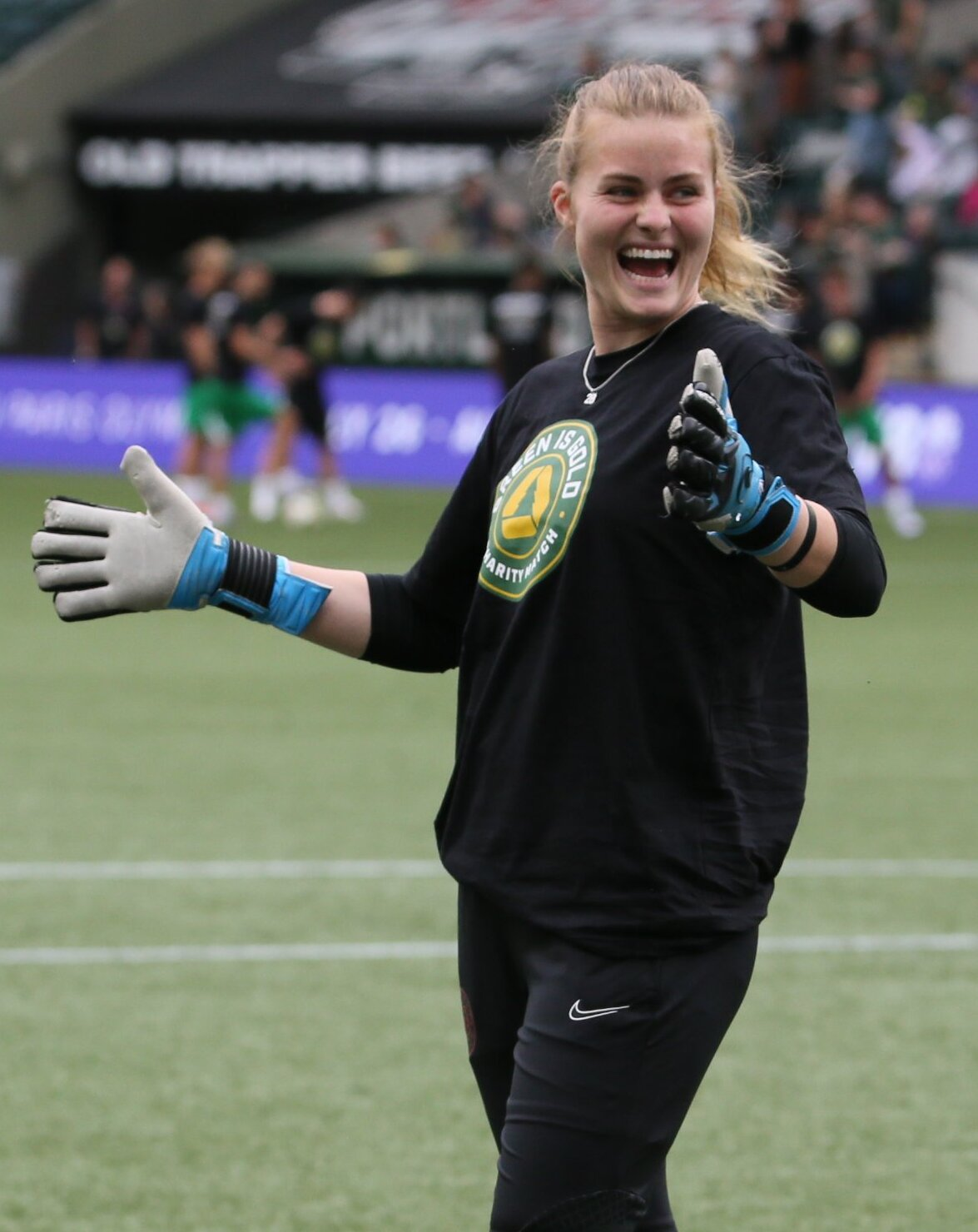
Asman in 2024

Asman was selected 39th overall by Portland Thorns FC in the third round of the 2024 NWSL Draft. She was signed to a one-year contract with a mutual option for an additional year. She spent her rookie season as the third-stringer behind Shelby Hogan and Mackenzie Arnold, and was released at the end of the season.

=== Orlando Pride ===
On December 11, 2024, the Orlando Pride announced the signing of Asman on a two-year contract. She entered the club as the third-stringer behind starter Anna Moorhouse and backup McKinley Crone.

==== Loan to Lexington SC ====
On July 2, 2025, the Pride announced that Asman would join USL Super League club Lexington SC on loan for the 2025–26 season. She made her professional debut with Lexington on August 23, starting in their season-opening 3–3 draw with Fort Lauderdale United. The following game, she kept her first professional clean sheet in a 2–0 win over Brooklyn FC, making three big saves in her home debut at Lexington SC Stadium. Starting all 28 games, she had an outstanding season as she led the league with 11 clean sheets and an 0.86 goals against average, earning the Golden Glove Award. She helped Lexington win the Players' Shield with the best record in the league, an impressive turnaround from their last place finish the previous season. In the playoffs, she allowed just one goal as Lexington won 2–0 over the Dallas Trinity in the semifinals, then 3–1 over the Carolina Ascent in the final, to become the first USL Super League team to complete the league double.

==== Loan to Denver Summit ====
On July 1, 2026, Asman joined NWSL expansion team Denver Summit on loan for the rest of the season. On August 22, following an injury to starter Abby Smith, she made her NWSL debut against her former club Portland Thorns, making five saves in a 1–0 defeat. She kept her first NWSL clean sheet on September 6, making four saves in a 3–0 win against defending champions Gotham FC to help end their ten-game unbeaten run.

== International career ==
Asman trained with the United States youth national team at the under-14, under-16, under-17, and under-18 levels.

== Honors and awards ==
Penn State Nittany Lions

- Big Ten women's soccer tournament: 2019, 2022

Lexington SC

- USL Super League: 2025–26
- USL Super League Players' Shield: 2025–26

Individual

- USL Super League Golden Glove: 2025–26
- Second-team All-Big Ten: 2023
- Big Ten tournament Defensive MVP: 2022
