= USL Super League awards =

Women's soccer awards

The USL Super League, a professional women's soccer league in the United States that began play in 2024, presents various annual and monthly honors to individual players. Some awards, such as Player of the Year, are voted by clubs' technical staffs, while others such as the Golden Boot go to the leaders in various statistical categories.

== Player of the Year ==
Voted by clubs' technical staffs, it is presented to the most outstanding player of the season.

USL Super League Player of the Year
Season	Player	Position	Nationality	Club	Ref.
2024–25	Emina Ekić	Midfielder	Bosnia and Herzegovina	Spokane Zephyr	
2025–26	Ashlyn Puerta	Midfielder	United States	Sporting JAX	

== Defender of the Year ==
Voted by clubs' technical staffs, it is presented to the most outstanding defender of the season.

USL Super League Defender of the Year
Season	Player	Position	Nationality	Club	Ref.
2024–25	Jill Aguilera	Left back	Puerto Rico	Carolina Ascent	
2025–26	Allison Pantuso	Center back	United States	Lexington SC	

== Goalkeeper of the Year ==
Voted by clubs' technical staffs, it is presented to the most outstanding goalkeeper of the season.

USL Super League Goalkeeper of the Year
Season	Player	Nationality	Club	Ref.
2024–25	Hope Hisey	United States	Spokane Zephyr	
2025–26	Hope Hisey (2)	United States	Spokane Zephyr	

== Young Player of the Year ==
Voted by clubs' technical staffs, it is presented to the most outstanding player under the age of 23 in her first professional season.

USL Super League Young Player of the Year
Season	Player	Position	Nationality	Club	Ref.
2024–25	Sealey Strawn	Forward	United States	Dallas Trinity	
2025–26	Ashlyn Puerta	Midfielder	United States	Sporting JAX	

== Golden Boot ==
The player with the most goals in the season.

USL Super League Golden Boot
Season	Player	Nationality	Club	Goals	Games	Rate	Ref.
2024–25	Allie Thornton	United States	Dallas Trinity	13	27	0.48	
2025–26	Catherine Barry	United States	Lexington SC	16	28	0.57	

== Golden Glove ==
The goalkeeper with the lowest goals against average who played at least half of her team's minutes in the season.

USL Super League Golden Glove
Season	Player	Nationality	Club	GA	Games	GAA	Ref.
2024–25	Meagan McClelland	United States	Carolina Ascent	17	18	0.97	
2025–26	Kat Asman	United States	Lexington SC	24	28	0.86	

== Golden Playmaker ==
The player with the most assists in the season (if multiple players are tied, the award goes to the player with the fewest minutes).

USL Super League Golden Playmaker
Season	Player	Position	Nationality	Club	Assists	Games	Ref.
2024–25	Jill Aguilera	Defender	Puerto Rico	Carolina Ascent	7	28	
2025–26	Ashlyn Puerta	Midfielder	United States	Sporting JAX	7	27	

== Coach of the Year ==
Voted by clubs' technical staffs, it is presented to the most outstanding head coach of the season.

USL Super League Coach of the Year
Season	Player	Nationality	Club	Ref.
2024–25	Philip Poole	England	Carolina Ascent	
2025–26	Stacey Balaam	England	Sporting JAX	

== Officials of the Year ==
USL Super League Referee of the Year
Season	Referee	Nationality	Ref.
2024–25	Danielle Chesky	United States	

USL Super League Assistant Referee of the Year
Season	Assistant Referee	Nationality	Ref.
2024–25	Jessica Carnevale	United States	

== All-League Teams ==
=== 2024–25 ===
Announced June 10, 2025

First Team
Pos.	Player	Club
GK	(United States) Hope Hisey	Spokane Zephyr
DF	(United States) Sydney Studer	Carolina Ascent
DF	(United States) Susanna Fitch	DC Power FC
DF	(Puerto Rico) Jill Aguilera	Carolina Ascent
MF	(United States) Amber Brooks	Dallas Trinity
MF	(Bosnia and Herzegovina) Emina Ekić	Spokane Zephyr
MF	(United States) Addie McCain	Fort Lauderdale United
MF	(United States) Sydny Nasello	Tampa Bay Sun
FW	(United States) Allie Thornton	Dallas Trinity
FW	(England) Natasha Flint	Fort Lauderdale United
FW	(United States) Mia Corbin	Carolina Ascent

Second Team
Pos.	Player	Club
GK	(United States) Samantha Leshnak Murphy	Carolina Ascent
DF	(Canada) Vivianne Bessette	Tampa Bay Sun
DF	(United States) Hannah Davison	Dallas Trinity
DF	(United States) Sarah Clark	Spokane Zephyr
DF	(Tonga) Laveni Vaka	Fort Lauderdale United
MF	(United States) Samantha Kroeger	Brooklyn FC
MF	(United States) Shea Moyer	Lexington SC
MF	(England) Chioma Ubogagu	Dallas Trinity
FW	(United States) Jasmine Hamid	Fort Lauderdale United
FW	(United States) Mackenzie George	Brooklyn FC
FW	(Denmark) Cecilie Fløe	Tampa Bay Sun

=== 2025–26 ===
Announced May 26, 2026

First Team
Pos.	Player	Club
GK	(United States) Hope Hisey (2)	Spokane Zephyr
DF	(Puerto Rico) Jill Aguilera (2)	Carolina Ascent
DF	(United States) Allison Pantuso	Lexington SC
DF	(United States) Sydney Studer (2)	Carolina Ascent
DF	(United States) Amber Wisner (2)	Dallas Trinity
MF	(United States) Taylor Aylmer	Lexington SC
MF	(United States) Emily Colton	DC Power FC
MF	(United States) Ashlyn Puerta	Sporting JAX
FW	(United States) Catherine Barry	Lexington SC
FW	(United States) Paige Kenton	Sporting JAX
FW	(United States) Sydny Nasello (2)	Tampa Bay Sun

Second Team
Pos.	Player	Club
GK	(United States) Kaitlyn Parks	Sporting JAX
DF	(Scotland) Georgia Brown	Sporting JAX
DF	(United States) Sydney Cummings	DC Power FC
DF	(United States) Reese Tappan	Spokane Zephyr
MF	(United States) Sophie Jones	Sporting JAX
MF	(United States) Emma Jaskaniec	Spokane Zephyr
MF	(United States) Addie McCain (2)	Lexington SC
MF	(United States) Kelli Van Treeck	Fort Lauderdale United
FW	(Republic of Ireland) Rebecca Cooke	Brooklyn FC
FW	(United States) Mackenzie George	Carolina Ascent
FW	(United States) Baylee DeSmit	Sporting JAX

== See also ==
- List of sports awards honoring women
- NWSL awards
- Women's soccer in the United States
