= Marz Josephson =

American soccer player (born 2001)

Personal information
- Full name: Marzia Ashley Josephson
- Date of birth: January 23, 2001 (age 25)
- Place of birth: Orlando, Florida, U.S.
- Height: 5 ft 7 in (1.70 m)
- Position: Goalkeeper

Team information
- Current team: Lexington SC
- Number: 7

Youth career
- 2015–2017: CASL
- 2017–2019: NC Courage Academy

College career
| Years | Team | Apps | (Gls) |
| 2019–2022 | North Carolina Tar Heels | 26 | (0) |
| 2023–2024 | Kentucky Wildcats | 40 | (0) |

Senior career*
| Years | Team | Apps | (Gls) |
| 2023 | Lexington SC (USLW) | – | (–) |
| 2026– | Lexington SC | 0 | (0) |
- * Club domestic league appearances and goals as of 05:15, July 20, 2026 (UTC)

Marzia Ashley Josephson (born January 23, 2001) is an American professional soccer player who plays as a goalkeeper for USL Super League club Lexington SC. She played college soccer for the North Carolina Tar Heels and the Kentucky Wildcats.

== Early life ==
Josephson was born in Orlando, Florida. Her family then moved to Ohio, where Josephson started playing soccer at the age of four, before finally settling in Apex, North Carolina. Josephson also participated in taekwondo as a child; she earned a second-degree black belt while in kindergarten. When she was nine years old, Josephson gained her first experience playing as a goalkeeper. She then went on to join multiple clubs, first joining CASL's Elite Clubs National League team before moving to the NC Courage Academy in 2017. She led both clubs to conference championships. Josephson also coached youth soccer, including as an assistant for the NCFC 07 Storm.

Originally, Josephson attended Apex Friendship High School. As a freshman, she captained the newly minted soccer team, playing in multiple positions and leading the squad in both saves and goals. She then moved to Crossroads FLEX High School ahead of her sophomore year. In addition to being an all-state honoree for soccer, Josephson also competed in basketball and in multiple track and field events. She graduated as valedictorian after having earned straight-A grades throughout both middle and high school.

== College career ==
=== North Carolina Tar Heels ===
Josephson spent her first four years of college soccer with the North Carolina Tar Heels. She had her most successful year as a freshman, starting in all but one of her 17 appearances in 2019. In September 2019, she had a season-highlight performance after making two saves and a penalty kick save in a shutout victory over Louisville to open North Carolina's Atlantic Coast Conference (ACC) campaign. She then made one appearance in the 2019 NCAA tournament as the Tar Heels finished as runners-up.

Josephson missed her sophomore season at UNC due to an injury. She was not called on to make an appearance in the 2021 fall season either. In 2022, Josephson returned to the field, coming on a s a substitute in all nine of her appearances. Upon departing from North Carolina, she had contributed to one trip to the NCAA semifinals and two trips to the NCAA championship match.

=== Kentucky Wildcats ===
Ahead of the 2023 season, Josephson transferred to the University of Kentucky. She went on to spend two years with the Wildcats, both as a graduate student. In 2023, she was named team captain and played every single minute for Kentucky. She recorded 52 saves and 9 shutouts, with her shutout count tying the second-highest in a single season in program history. The following year, Josephson played every minute for the Wildcats once again. On September 9, 2024, she was named the Southeastern Conference (SEC) Defensive Player of the Week after leading Kentucky to victories over Murray State and UCLA. She made two penalty shootout saves in the Wildcats' NCAA tournament first round win over West Virginia two months later. She totaled 16 clean sheets across 40 appearances for Kentucky.

== Club career ==
In the offseason heading into her first year at Kentucky, Josephson played for Lexington SC's pre-professional squad in the 2023 USL W League season. After finishing her collegiate career, she spent time at the end of the 2025–26 USL Super League season training with Lexington SC's professional team. On July 9, 2026, Josephson was officially announced to have signed her first professional contract with Lexington as a member of the club's USLS squad.

== International career ==
Josephson attended five United States under-15 national team camps across 2015 and 2016. She was also a part of the under-17 national team player pool.

== Honors ==
North Carolina Tar Heels

- Atlantic Coast Conference: 2019, 2022
- ACC tournament: 2019
