= Philip Poole (soccer) =

English-born American soccer coach (born 1981)

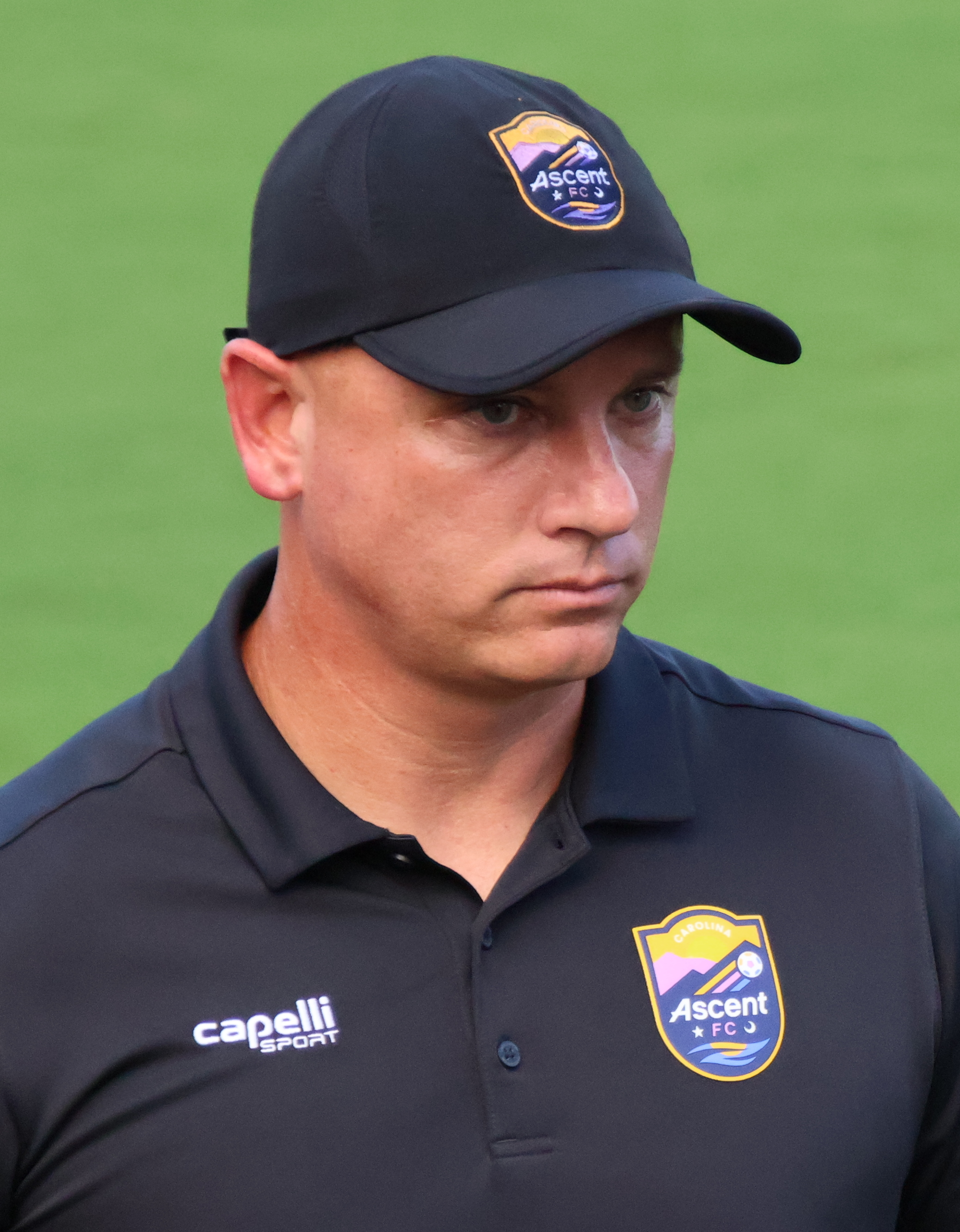
- Poole with the Carolina Ascent in 2025

Personal information
- Date of birth: 1981 (age 44–45)
- Place of birth: Newcastle, England
- Position: Goalkeeper

Team information
- Current team: Carolina Ascent (head coach)

Youth career
- Newcastle United
- Hull City

College career
Years	Team	Apps	(Gls)
- Wingate Bulldogs

Managerial career
- 2015–2018: Charlotte Soccer Academy (academy director)
- 2019: Wake Forest Demon Deacons (women; associate head coach)
- 2020–2024: United States (women; goalkeeping coach)
- 2024–: Carolina Ascent

Philip Poole (born 1981) is an English professional soccer coach who is the head coach of USL Super League club Carolina Ascent.

== Career ==
Born in Newcastle, Poole played youth football for Newcastle United and Hull City before coming to the United States to attend Wingate University in North Carolina. With the Wingate Bulldogs, he won two South Atlantic Conference titles and captained the team for two years. After graduating in 2004, he moved into coaching and became an assistant/goalkeeping coach with the Wingate Bulldogs, Charlotte 49ers, Charlotte Eagles, Charlotte Independence, and Puerto Rico men's national team.

In the Charlotte youth scene, he had been the executive director of the Lake Norman Soccer Club and then the girls' academy director for the Charlotte Soccer Academy. In 2019, he spent one season with the Wake Forest Demon Deacons as the associate head coach to Tony da Luz.

Poole began working for the United States Soccer Federation as a youth coach and scout in 2012. He was the goalkeeping coach for the women's under-20 team at the 2014 FIFA U-20 Women's World Cup and the under-23 team from 2017 to 2019. In 2020, he joined Vlatko Andonovski's coaching staff with the women's full team.

In January 2024, Poole was named the head coach of the newly formed Carolina Ascent ahead of the USL Super League's inaugural season. He earned his U.S. Soccer Pro License the same month. In the inaugural regular season, he led the Ascent to top the final standings and win the USL Super League Players' Shield. Poole was named the league's Coach of the Year at the end of the season.

== Honors and awards ==
Carolina Ascent

- USL Super League Players' Shield: 2024–25

=== Individual ===
- USL Super League Coach of the Year: 2024–25
