= Ally Brown (soccer, born 2003) =

American soccer player (born 2003)

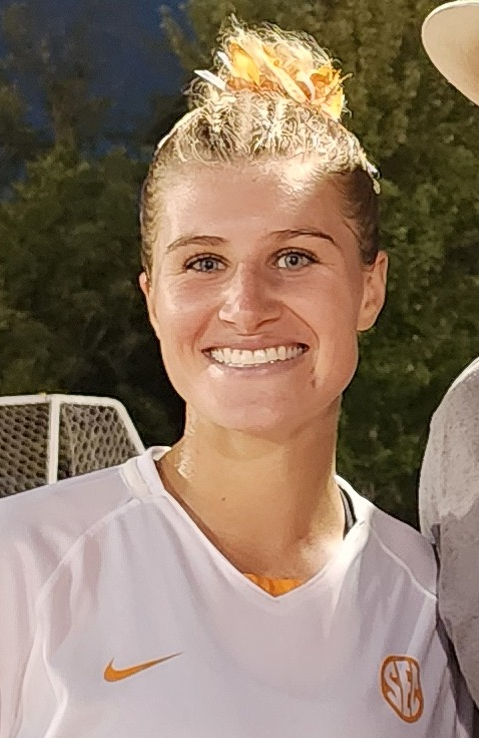
- Brown with Tennessee in 2025

Personal information
- Full name: Allyson Elizabeth Brown
- Date of birth: October 9, 2003 (age 23)
- Height: 5 ft 7 in (1.70 m)
- Positions: Left back; center back

Team information
- Current team: Lexington SC
- Number: 16

Youth career
- Sockers FC
- 2021–2022: Tennessee SC

College career
| Years | Team | Apps | (Gls) |
| 2022–2025 | Tennessee Volunteers | 64 | (3) |

Senior career*
| Years | Team | Apps | (Gls) |
| 2026– | Lexington SC | 18 | (0) |
- * Club domestic league appearances and goals as of September 26, 2026

Allyson Elizabeth Brown (born October 9, 2003) is an American professional soccer player who plays as a left back for USL Super League club Lexington SC. She played college soccer for the Tennessee Volunteers, earning All-American honors in 2025.

== Early life ==
Brown grew up in Wheaton, Illinois, and began playing soccer at age four. She was initially coached by her father and played on boys' teams. She committed to play college soccer for the Tennessee Volunteers over another offer from South Carolina during her junior year at Wheaton North High School, where she played basketball. After she committed to play for the Volunteers, her family moved to College Grove, Tennessee, and she attended Ravenwood High School, where she played flag football as a safety and wide receiver. She also moved club teams from Sockers FC to Tennessee SC. TopDrawerSoccer ranked her as the 24th-best player and 6th-best defender in the class of 2022.

== College career ==
Brown played in seven games as a substitute for Tennessee during her freshman year in 2022, not making the team's travel squad. She became a starting center back as a sophomore in 2023, playing in 18 games with 16 starts and leading the team with 5 assists. In her junior year in 2024, she started all 20 games, leading the team in minutes played, and scored one goal, earning third-team All-SEC honors. She co-captained the Volunteers to an impressive start to her senior season in 2025, taking down defending national champions North Carolina in the season opener and achieving the No. 1 ranking for the first time in program history. She finished the season as the only player to start all 19 games for Tennessee and had 2 goals with 4 assists. The team earned a three seed in the NCAA tournament but lost their rematch with North Carolina in the first round, the team's third first-round exit in four years. Brown was named first-team All-SEC and fourth-team All-American alongside teammate Mac Midgley.

== Club career ==
USL Super League club Lexington SC announced on January 22, 2026, that they had signed Brown to her first professional contract on a two-year deal. She made her professional debut on February 21, replacing Alyssa Bourgeois as a second-half substitute in a 3–0 defeat to Sporting JAX, Lexington's first loss of the season. She subsequently became the starting left back for Lexington as the club won the Players' Shield with the best record and best defense in the league. In the playoffs, she helped Lexington win 2–0 over the Dallas Trinity in the semifinals, then 3–1 over the Carolina Ascent in the final, to become the first USL Super League team to complete the league double.

== International career ==
Brown was called into training camps with the United States under-17 team in 2019 and 2020. She was called into a development camp, training concurrently with the senior national team, in January 2026.

== Personal life ==
Brown is the daughter of Skip and Kathy Brown. Her father played college soccer for Wheaton College, winning the NCAA Division III men's soccer tournament in 1997. Brown excelled academically at the University of Tennessee, graduating with a 3.99 grade point average (GPA) and being named the SEC Scholar Athlete of the Year in 2025. She announced her engagement to Minnesota United 2 soccer player Nick Dang in September 2026.

== Honors and awards ==
Lexington SC

- USL Super League: 2025–26
- USL Super League Players' Shield: 2025–26

Individual

- Fourth-team All-American: 2025
- First-team All-SEC: 2025
- Third-team All-SEC: 2024
