= Mac Midgley =

American soccer player (born 2003)

Personal information
- Full name: Macaira Jessica Midgley
- Date of birth: August 6, 2003 (age 23)
- Height: 5 ft 1 in (1.55 m)
- Position: Midfielder

Team information
- Current team: Lexington SC
- Number: 10

Youth career
- 2014–2022: Michigan Hawks

College career
Years	Team	Apps	(Gls)
2022–2025	Tennessee Volunteers	70	(8)

Senior career*
Years	Team	Apps	(Gls)
2026–	Lexington SC	1	(1)
- * Club domestic league appearances and goals as of 17:33, August 30, 2026 (UTC)

Macaira Jessica Midgley (born August 6, 2003) is an American professional soccer player who plays as a midfielder for USL Super League club Lexington SC. She played college soccer for the Tennessee Volunteers, earning All-American honors in 2025.

== Early life ==
Midgley is the daughter of Mark and Molly Midgley. She grew up in Wolverine Lake, Michigan, where she attended Walled Lake Western High School. She played in the Elite Clubs National League (ECNL) for the Michigan Hawks, joining the club in 2014 and playing up until she moved away from home to attend college. In 2019, she helped the Hawks reach the ECNL national finals. The following year, she was an ECNL all-conference honoree.

== College career ==
In October 2020, Midgley committed to the University of Tennessee. She started her first season of college soccer for the Volunteers in 2022 and was one of the more significant freshman contributors on the team that year. She scored her first college goal on September 4, striking from outside the box in a match against Tennessee Tech. She also picked up an assist before the season's end. In the 2022 SEC tournament, she made a substitute appearance for the Volunteers in a loss to Georgia. As a sophomore in 2023, Midgley made 20 matches (starting in all but one) and ranked third on Tennessee in minutes played. She helped the Volunteers advance to the second round of the NCAA tournament, scoring a goal in an eventual defeat to Nebraska.

The following year, Midgley was named third-team All-SEC and fourth-team All-region. She was also named the SEC player of the week on September 16, 2024, after scoring the lone goal in a 1–0 win over Memphis, a team which was ranked seventh overall in the nation at that time. Midgley rounded out her collegiate career with a season that earned her fourth-team All-American, second-team All-region, and second-team All-SEC honors. She had also been one of Tennessee's three 2025 team captains.

== Club career ==
On July 6, 2026, USL Super League club Lexington SC announced the signing of Midgley to her first professional contract. The move reunited Midgley with her college teammate, roommate, and close friend Ally Brown, who had joined Lexington earlier in the year. She scored a goal in her professional debut on August 29, 2026, finishing off a pass from Hannah White in a 2–1 loss to DC Power FC.

== International career ==
In October 2021, Midgley earned her first call-up to the United states under-20 national team, joining the squad for a training camp in Chula Vista, California.

== Personal life ==
Midgley is a practitioner of Christianity. While playing for the Tennessee Volunteers, she often actively participated in faith-based team activities.

== Honors and awards ==
Individual

- Fourth-team All-American: 2025
- Second-team All-SEC: 2025
- Third-team All-SEC: 2024
