= Amber Nguyen =

American soccer player (born 2002)

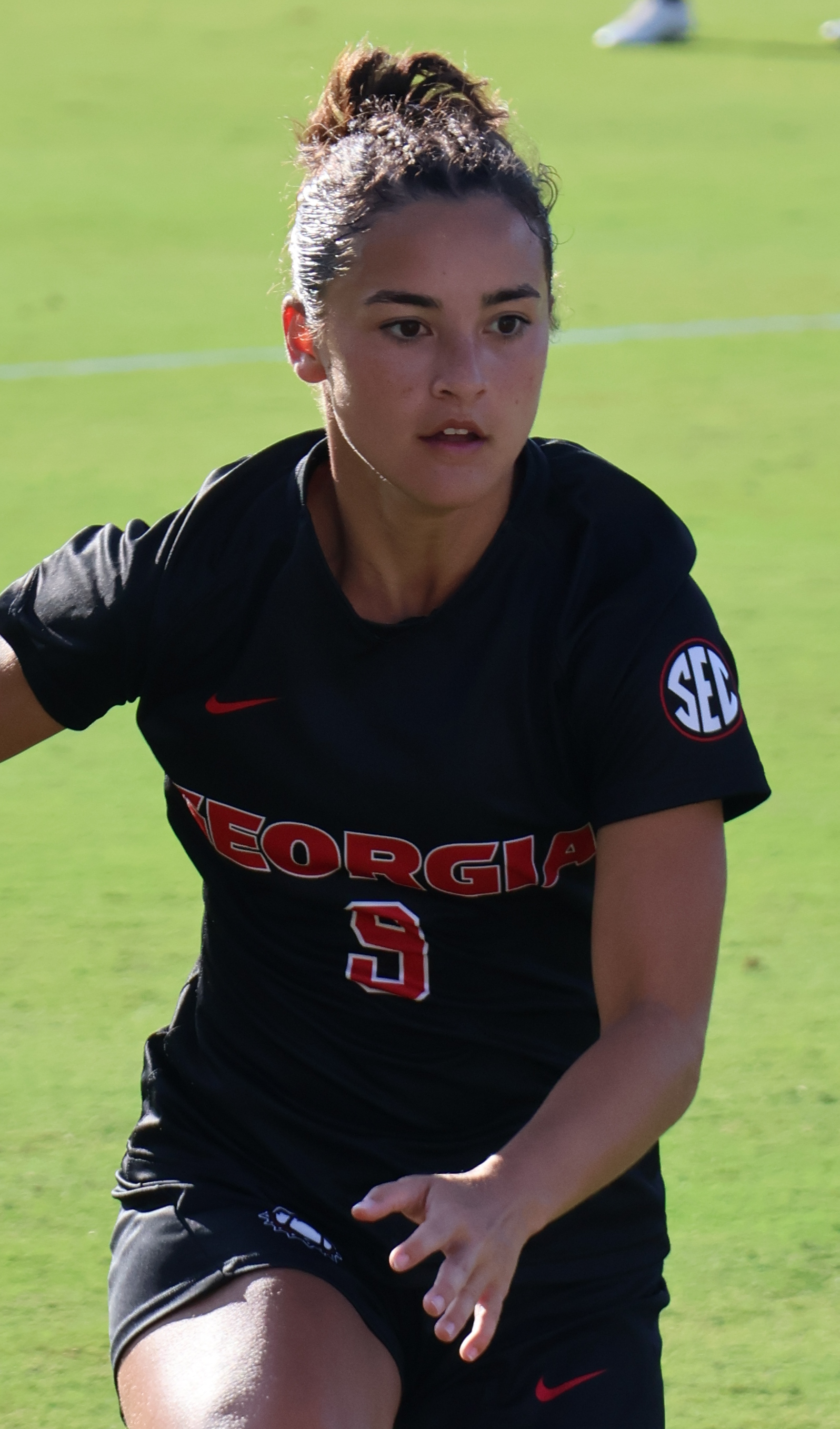
- Nguyen with Georgia in 2024

Personal information
- Full name: Amber Katherine Nguyen
- Date of birth: February 26, 2002 (age 24)
- Place of birth: Macon, Georgia, United States
- Height: 5 ft 3 in (1.60 m)
- Positions: Midfielder; forward

Team information
- Current team: Fort Lauderdale United (on loan from Lexington SC)
- Number: 6

Youth career
- Tophat SC

College career
Years	Team	Apps	(Gls)
2020–2023	Vanderbilt Commodores	66	(5)
2024	Georgia Bulldogs	21	(2)

Senior career*
Years	Team	Apps	(Gls)
2025	North Carolina Courage	0	(0)
2025–	Lexington SC	9	(0)
2026–	→ Fort Lauderdale United (loan)	0	(0)

International career
2018	United States U-16	2	(0)
2019	United States U-18	2	(0)
2019	United States U-20	1	(0)
- * Club domestic league appearances and goals as of October 12, 2026

Amber Katherine Nguyen (born February 26, 2002) is an American professional soccer player who plays as a midfielder or forward for USL Super League club Fort Lauderdale United, on loan from Lexington SC. She played college soccer for the Vanderbilt Commodores and the Georgia Bulldogs.

== Early life ==
Nguyen was born in Macon, Georgia, the daughter of Don and Tonya Nguyen, and grew up in Snellville, Georgia. She has two older brothers. She played DA club soccer for Tophat Soccer Club, earning United Soccer Coaches All-American honors three times and being named DA Best Midfielder in 2019. She graduated from Shiloh High School. She initially committed to play college soccer at Tennessee before changing her commitment to Vanderbilt later in her senior year.

== College career ==
Nguyen won the SEC tournament with the Vanderbilt Commodores in her freshman season in 2020, making all but one of her appearances that year off the substitute bench. She broke into the starting lineup during her sophomore season in 2021, scoring 1 goal and making a career-high 5 assists in 16 games. In her junior season in 2022, she scored 3 goals and added 2 assists in 18 games. helping Vanderbilt advance to the semifinals of the SEC tournament and the second round of the NCAA tournament. She started all 18 games and scored 2 goals for the Commodores in her senior season in 2023, a down year for the team.

Nguyen transferred to the Georgia Bulldogs to use her fifth year of college eligibility as a graduate student in 2024. She played in all 21 games, starting 19, and scored 2 goals.

== Club career ==
Nguyen joined the North Carolina Courage as a non-roster trialist in the 2025 preseason. She was signed to a short-term contract from March to April.

On July 1, 2025, USL Super League club Lexington SC announced the signing of Nguyen. She made her professional debut on October 10, coming on as a late substitute for Sarah Griffith in a 1–1 draw with the Carolina Ascent. During her first season with Lexington, she helped the club win the league championship and the Players' Shield, making them the first team to complete the league double.

On October 14, 2026, Nguyen was sent on loan to fellow league club Fort Lauderdale United until the end of the year.

== International career ==
Nguyen trained with the youth national team at the under-16, under-18, and under-20 levels, appearing in friendlies at each age level.

== Honors and awards ==
Vanderbilt Commodores

- SEC women's soccer tournament: 2020

Lexington SC

- USL Super League: 2025–26
- USL Super League Players' Shield: 2025–26
