= Hannah Johnson (soccer) =

American soccer player (born 2002)

Personal information
- Full name: Hannah Grace Johnson
- Date of birth: December 27, 2002 (age 23)
- Place of birth: Jacksonville, Florida, United States
- Height: 5 ft 6 in (1.68 m)
- Position: Defender

Team information
- Current team: Lexington SC
- Number: 19

College career
Years	Team	Apps	(Gls)
2021–2024	Mississippi State Bulldogs	81	(7)

Senior career*
Years	Team	Apps	(Gls)
2025	Angel City	1	(0)
2025–	Lexington SC	25	(0)
- * Club domestic league appearances and goals as of May 16, 2026

Hannah Grace Johnson (born December 27, 2002) is an American professional soccer player who plays as a defender for Lexington SC of the USL Super League. She played college soccer for the Mississippi State Bulldogs.

== College career ==
Johnson tallied 4,924 minutes in 81 match appearances for the Bulldogs, earning seven goals and 13 assists. Her versatility as a midfielder and forward earned her 2024 SEC All-Tournament Team 2024 SEC Preseason Watchlist selections. In her senior season, Johnson notched assists in the first two rounds of the NCAA Tournament.

== Club career ==
=== Angel City ===
Johnson was invited to train with Angel City FC as a non-roster trialist and performed well during the preseason Coachella Valley Invitational. Angel City announced that they had signed Johnson to her first professional contract on March 3, 2025, on a roster relief contract through June 30, 2025. Johnson made her NWSL debut on June 7, 2025, coming on as a substitute at a home match against Chicago Stars FC, which finished as a 2–2 draw. Johnson and Breanna Norris were both released by Angel City on July 1, 2025.

=== Lexington SC ===
On July 2, 2025, USL Super League club Lexington SC announced that they had signed Johnson ahead of the 2025–26 USL Super League season. Johnson debuted for the club on August 23, starting and playing all 90 minutes of Lexington's season-opening draw with Fort Lauderdale United FC. In her first season with Lexington, the club won the league championship and the Players' Shield, becoming the first team to complete the league double. Lexington SC chose to exercise Johnson's contract option at the end of the season, keeping her around for another campaign.

== Career statistics ==
As of June 16, 2026

Appearances and goals by club, season and competition
Club	Season	League			Cup (Note: Includes the NWSL Challenge Cup)		Playoffs (Note: Includes USL Super League playoffs.)		Total	
Club	Season	Division	Apps	Goals	Apps	Goals	Apps	Goals	Apps	Goals
Angel City FC	2025	NWSL	1	0	—		—		1	0
Lexington SC	2025–26	USL Super League	25	0	—		1	0	26	0
Career total			26	0	0	0	1	0	27	0

== Honors ==
Lexington SC

- USL Super League: 2025–26
- USL Super League Players' Shield: 2025–26
