= Hannah Sharts =

American soccer player (born 1999)

Personal information
- Full name: Hannah Michele Sharts
- Date of birth: August 1, 1999 (age 27)
- Place of birth: Simi Valley, California, U.S.
- Height: 5 ft 11 in (1.80 m)
- Position: Center back

Team information
- Current team: Parma
- Number: 5

Youth career
- Slammers FC

College career
Years	Team	Apps	(Gls)
2017–2018	UCLA Bruins	6	(0)
2019–2022	Colorado Buffaloes	78	(9)

Senior career*
Years	Team	Apps	(Gls)
2023	KuPS	17	(2)
2024	Stjarnan	18	(3)
2024–2025	Racing Power FC	14	(0)
2025–2026	Lexington SC	22	(0)
2026–	Parma	0	(0)
- * Club domestic league appearances and goals as of 05:52, June 18, 2026 (UTC)

Hannah Michele Sharts (born August 1, 1999) is an American professional soccer player who plays as a center back for Serie A club Parma. She played college soccer for the UCLA Bruins and the Colorado Buffaloes before starting her professional career with European clubs KuPS, Stjarnan, and Racing Power FC. She has also previously been a member of USL Super League club Lexington SC, winning both the league championship and the Players' Shield in 2026.

== Early life ==
Sharts was born in Simi Valley, California, but grew up in the nearby town of Newbury Park. At the age of 4, she joined her first AYSO team, which her mother coached. Sharts eventually started playing with Slammers FC and also was a member of multiple California ODP teams, including the 2015 ODP All-Star squad. She earned four varsity letters at Westlake High School and won three league titles with the team. Sharts herself received multiple individual honors, including one defensive MVP and two Marmonte League MVP awards.

== College career ==
=== UCLA Bruins ===
During her search for a college, Sharts prioritized schools in California. She ended up staying particularly close to home, signing with a school only thirty minutes away from her neighborhood: UCLA. She redshirted her first year of NCAA eligibility and took to the field for the first time as a college sophomore. Once on the pitch, she struggled to find playing time, making 6 appearances and only recording 61 minutes of action. Craving more on-field opportunities and growing disillusioned with UCLA's team environment, Sharts chose to enter the transfer portal at the end of her redshirt freshman season.

=== Colorado Buffaloes ===
In 2019, Sharts transferred to University of Colorado Boulder, where she played for the Buffaloes. She quickly became a core part of the team, starting every single match in her first three seasons with Colorado. In two of those seasons, she also led the team in minutes played. Near the end of 2019, she scored the game-winning goal against Washington to secure a spot for Colorado in the NCAA tournament, where they were eventually eliminated in the second round by North Carolina.

Sharts continued her offensive form into 2020, where she was the second-highest goalscorer on the team despite playing on the backline. Two of her goals were game-winners, and they both occurred only two days away from one another. She was also a defensive contributor, helping the Buffaloes defensive unit register 8 shutouts on the year. Sharts was named first-team All-Pacific, All-West, and All-Pac-12 for her strong performances.

In her third year at Colorado, Sharts received Colorado defensive MVP honors and recognition on the All-Pacific Region second team. In late June 2021, she was named Pac-12 Defensive Player of the Week after scoring in a 3–0 victory over Northern Colorado. Sharts played one more season before departing the Buffaloes program for good. She left as a three-year team captain and the first Colorado soccer player to be named an Academic All-American.

== Club career ==
=== KuPS ===
On January 13, 2023, Sharts signed her first professional contract, a one-year deal, with Finnish club KuPS. She played in 17 league games in her single season with the club, winning both the Kansallinen Liiga title and the Finnish Women's Cup. Sharts also played a role in KuPS' quest for entry to the UEFA Women's Champions League. In the first game of the team's qualification bracket, she scored the last-minute, game-winning header against bracket hosts HB Køge to secure victory. During the following match, against Serbian champions ŽFK Spartak Subotica, an early shot from Sharts rebounded into the path of Aino Kröger, who converted the chance and opened the scoring. However, it was not enough, and Spartak eliminated KuPS from the competition by way of a Doris Boaduwaa brace.

=== Stjarnan ===
Sharts did not return to KuPS upon the expiration of her contract. Instead, she moved to Iceland and signed with top-flight club Stjarnan. She quickly started gaining playing time with the team and played a prominent role in Stjarnan's first win of the season, a 3–2 comeback victory from two goals down against Keflavík ÍF. In the first half of the match, she committed a handball inside her own box, leading to a penalty kick goal from Aníta Lind Daníelsdóttir. However, Sharts rebounded from the error and contributed to all 3 of Stjarnan's goals, scoring twice and using her signature long throw-in to assist Caitlin Cosme's game-winning header. She totaled 19 total appearances for the club, 18 in the Besta deild kvenna and 1 in the Icelandic Women's Football Cup.

=== Racing Power FC ===
On September 19, 2024, Sharts joined Portuguese club Racing Power FC near the start of its second campaign in the Campeonato Nacional Feminino. She earned her first career red card in a game against Torreense, receiving two yellow cards in quick succession in the 76th minute of the match. At the end of the season, Racing Power announced Sharts' departure.

=== Lexington SC ===
On July 1, 2025, Sharts signed with Lexington SC ahead of the second season of the USL Super League. She made her Lexington debut on August 23, starting and playing all 90 minutes of the club's season-opening draw with Fort Lauderdale United FC. In October 2025, Sharts was named to the USL Super League Team of the Month after playing every minute of October. She proved to be a regular in the Lexington lineup throughout the first half of the USLS season and led the club in clearances and blocks throughout the first 11 matches of the 2025–26 campaign. In her first season with Lexington, she helped the club win the league championship and the Players' Shield, making them the first team to complete the league double. Although Lexington SC had previously triggered Sharts' contract option in December 2025 to renew her for another season, both parties agreed on a contract termination on July 17, 2026, to allow Sharts to pursue opportunities abroad.

=== Parma ===
On 5 August 2026, Sharts joined Italian Serie A club Parma on a two-year deal until 2028.

== Style of play ==
Sharts plays primarily as a center back. She is known for her size, physicality, and ability to lock down opposing forwards. She often uses her considerable height to provide offensive threat on corner kicks and other set pieces. Sharts also possesses a 40-yard long throw-in, which has been referred to by the Los Angeles Daily News as the "Sharts Attack." She developed the technique with her father, who has experience as a baseball pitcher. Sharts has weaponized her throw-in since her high school days, once creating three goals in a single game with the throw.

== Personal life ==
Sharts' parents are both former athletes. Over twenty years before Sharts had her first stint of college soccer, her mother, Michele, played for the UCLA Bruins while it was still a club team. Michele later helped promote the Bruins to the NCAA level, participating in rallies across campus and joining her club teammates in a threat to file a Title IX lawsuit against the school. Sharts' father, Scott, played college baseball for the Miami Hurricanes and the Cal State Northridge Matadors before spending time in the Minor Leagues as a member of the Cleveland Indians. Her younger sister, Sydney, plays college soccer for the Sacramento State Hornets; she was previously a member of the Kansas State Wildcats and the Oklahoma Sooners.

== Honors ==
Lexington SC

- USL Super League: 2025–26
- USL Super League Players' Shield: 2025–26
