= Sarah Griffith =

American soccer player (born 1999)

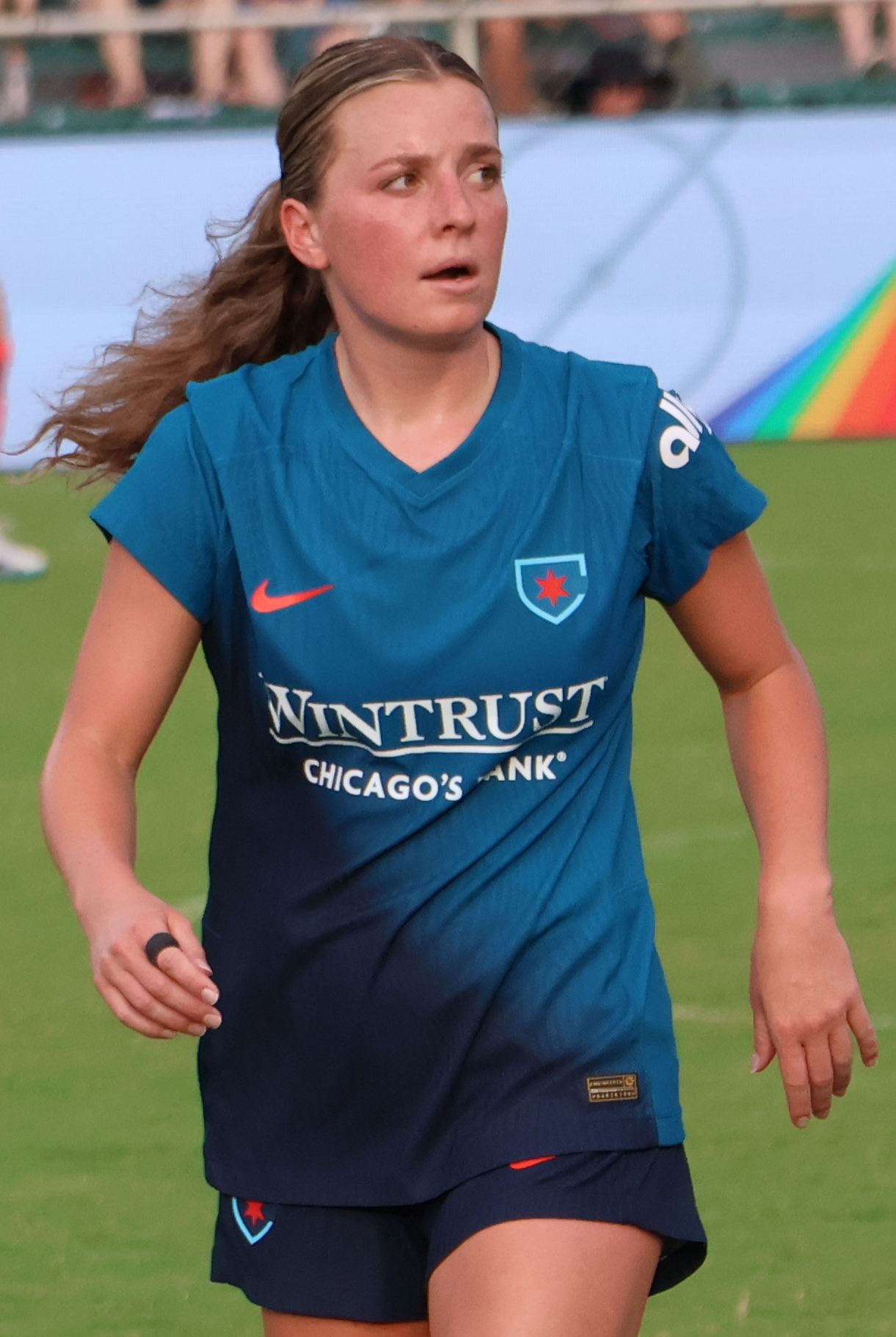
- Griffith with the Chicago Red Stars in 2024

Personal information
- Full name: Sarah Elaine Griffith
- Date of birth: April 30, 1999 (age 27)
- Place of birth: Naperville, Illinois, United States
- Height: 5 ft 4 in (1.63 m)
- Position: Forward

Team information
- Current team: Lexington SC
- Number: 35

College career
Years	Team	Apps	(Gls)
2017–2021	Purdue Boilermakers	72	(26)

Senior career*
Years	Team	Apps	(Gls)
2022–2025	Chicago Stars (Note: Known as Chicago Red Stars until the 2025 season.)	28	(2)
2022–2023	→ Newcastle Jets (loan)	11	(4)
2025	→ Calgary Wild (loan)	6	(0)
2025–	Lexington SC	27	(4)
- * Club domestic league appearances and goals as of May 16, 2026

Sarah Elaine Griffith (born April 30, 1999) is an American professional soccer player who plays as a forward for USL Super League club Lexington SC. She played college soccer for the Purdue Boilermakers and was drafted by the Chicago Red Stars in the third round of the 2022 NWSL Draft.

== Early life ==
Griffith was a ball girl for the Waubonsie Valley High School girls' soccer team, and later graduated from the school.

== College career ==
Griffith initially committed to play college soccer at Illinois State. She later de-committed and played at Purdue from 2017 to 2021. She scored her first collegiate goal on August 27, 2017, against Indiana State. In 2018, Griffith was diagnosed with spondylolisthesis; she would undergo spinal surgery as she redshirted the 2018 season.

She was named to the All-Big Ten Conference second team for the 2020–21 season. On August 19, 2021, she scored a goal against Kentucky which was featured on SportsCenter, and on August 29, 2021, she recorded a hat-trick against Ball State. For the 2021 season, she was Big Ten Forward of the Year and All-Big Ten first team; she was also named United Soccer Coaches All-America Second Team and set a Purdue record with 16 goals.

As a student at Purdue University, Griffith majored in psychological sciences.

== Club career ==
=== Chicago Stars ===
In December 2021, Griffith was selected by the Chicago Red Stars (later named Chicago Stars FC) in the third round of the 2022 NWSL Draft. She made her NWSL regular season debut on April 30, 2022, playing 80 minutes against Racing Louisville FC. She scored her first goal for the club against Orlando Pride on May 22, 2022. On July 10, 2022, she scored against North Carolina Courage in the stoppage time.

On November 1, 2022, it was announced that Griffith was signed on-loan by Newcastle Jets for the 2022–23 A-League Women season. On November 26, 2022, Griffith scored a hat-trick in a match against Western Sydney Wanderers leading the team to a 4–2 victory. In mid-February 2023, Griffith returned from her loan early to prepare for the 2023 NWSL season.

On March 27, 2025, it was announced that Griffith was being loaned to Calgary Wild FC through the remainder of her contract with Chicago. On April 16, 2025, she started in the league's inaugural game, a 1–0 loss to Vancouver Rise FC.

=== Lexington SC ===
In August 2025, Griffith signed with USL Super League club Lexington SC before the league's second season. She made her club debut that month, starting in their season-opening 3–3 draw with Fort Lauderdale United. On October 16, she scored her first goals for the club, netting twice in a 5–1 win over the same opponents. In February 2026, she re-signed with Lexington until the summer of 2027. She finished her first season with 5 goals in 27 games as Lexington, who were bottom of the table the previous season, won the Players' Shield with the best record in the league. In the playoff semifinals, she scored the opening goal in a 2–0 win over the Dallas Trinity. Lexington won 3–1 over the Carolina Ascent in the final, becoming the first team to complete the league double. At the end of the season, Lexington re-signed Griffith to a new one-year contract, keeping her around for another season.

== Personal life ==
Griffith was born to parents Peter and Melissa, and was raised with an older brother, Noah, who played college soccer for Illinois Tech, and a younger brother, Aaron.

== Career statistics ==
As of July 31, 2025

Appearances and goals by club, season and competition
Club	Season	League			Playoffs (Note: Includes NWSL Playoffs and A-League Women Finals series)		League Cup (Note: Includes the NWSL Challenge Cup)		Other		Total	
Club	Season	Division	Apps	Goals	Apps	Goals	Apps	Goals	Apps	Goals	Apps	Goals
Chicago Red Stars	2022	NWSL	19	2	1	0	6	0	—		26	2
Chicago Red Stars	2023	NWSL	6	0	—		4	0	—		10	0
Chicago Red Stars	2024	NWSL	6	0	—		—		2 (Note: Includes the NWSL x Liga MX Femenil Summer Cup)	1	8	1
Chicago Red Stars	Total		31	2	1	0	10	0	2	1	44	3
Newcastle Jets FC (loan)	2022–23	A-League	11	4	—		—		—		11	4
Calgary Wild (loan)	2025	Northern Super League	6	0	0	0	—		—		6	0
Lexington SC	2025–26	USL Super League	0	0	—		—		—		0	0
Career total			48	6	1	0	10	0	2	1	61	7

== Honors and awards ==
Lexington SC

- USL Super League: 2025–26
- USL Super League Players' Shield: 2025–26

Individual

- United Soccer Coaches All-America Second Team: 2021
- United Soccer Coaches All-North Region First Team: 2021
- Big Ten Forward of the Year: 2021
- All-Big Ten First Team: 2021
- All-Big Ten Second Team: 2020–21
- Big Ten All-Tournament Team: 2021
