= Addie McCain =

American soccer player (born 1998)

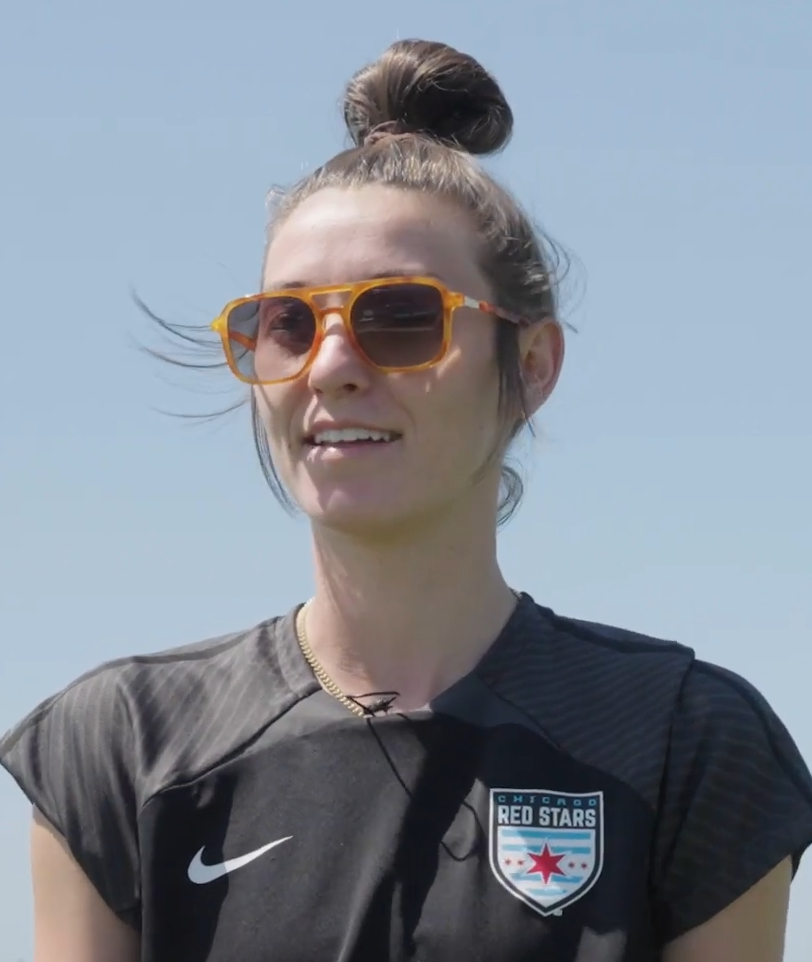
- McCain with the Chicago Red Stars in 2023

Personal information
- Full name: Addison Taylor McCain
- Date of birth: August 28, 1998 (age 28)
- Place of birth: Wylie, Texas, United States
- Height: 5 ft 9 in (1.75 m)
- Position: Midfielder

Team information
- Current team: Lexington SC
- Number: 18

Youth career
- 2006–2017: FC Dallas
- 2014–2017: Wylie East Lady Raiders

College career
Years	Team	Apps	(Gls)
2017–2020	Texas A&M Aggies	75	(16)

Senior career*
Years	Team	Apps	(Gls)
2021–2022	Kansas City Current	25	(0)
2023	Chicago Red Stars	1	(0)
2024–2025	Fort Lauderdale United	30	(10)
2025–	Lexington SC	27	(9)
- * Club domestic league appearances and goals as of November 23, 2025

Addison Taylor McCain (born August 28, 1998) is an American professional soccer player who plays as a midfielder for USL Super League club Lexington SC. She played college soccer for the Texas A&M Aggies and was named the SEC Midfielder of the Year in 2020. She was drafted by the Kansas City Current in the second round of the 2021 NWSL Draft. After two years there, she joined the Chicago Red Stars before moving to Fort Lauderdale United for the inaugural USL Super League season. She was then traded to Lexington SC for a league record transfer fee in 2025.

== Early life ==
McCain joined the FC Dallas Juniors' team at age seven. Throughout the next 11 years, she guided her teams to conference championships, consistently playing up divisions. At the U-14 level, her team was ranked No. 3 in the nation. She spent her last seasons with the FC Dallas Women's Premier Soccer League team. In 2015, as a sophomore, she led Wylie East High School to the 5A State Championship and was named the tournament MVP; scoring 19 goals the following season.

=== Texas A&M Aggies ===
Addie McCain graduated high school early to enroll at Texas A&M where she attended from 2017 to 2020. While making 75 caps with 66 starts she received several honors throughout her college career; including 2017 SEC All-Freshman Team, 2018 All-SEC Second Team, 2020 All-SEC First Team, 2020 SEC Midfielder of the Year. She graduated early to prepare for the professional game.

== Club career ==
=== Kansas City Current ===
McCain was selected by NWSL expansion team Kansas City as the 17th overall pick of the 2021 NWSL Draft. She signed a two-year deal with the team in March 2021 and made her professional debut on April 26, 2021, against the Houston Dash. McCain scored her first goal for the Kansas City Current on March 18, 2022, in the 78th minute of the opening match of the 2022 NWSL Challenge Cup against Racing Louisville FC to bring the game to a 1–1 tie, which was the final score of the game. She was waived by the Current in December 2022.

=== Chicago Red Stars ===
She signed with Chicago Red Stars in January 2023. She was released by Chicago in February 2024.

=== Fort Lauderdale United ===
She signed with Fort Lauderdale United FC in May 2024. On August 17 in her club debut, she scored her first league goal as well as the first goal in club history against Spokane Zephyr FC in a 1–1 draw. On September 22, 2024, McCain scored her first career hat-trick against Lexington SC, the second hat trick ever in USLS league history. McCain led the league in duels won with 187 and was named to the All-League First Team.

=== Lexington SC ===
On July 7, 2025, it was announced that Fort Lauderdale had transferred McCain to Lexington SC for a league record transfer fee. She debuted for the club on August 23, starting and scoring a goal in Lexington's season-opening 3–3 draw with Fort Lauderdale United. McCain's performances through the start of the season earned her a spot on the USL Super League September Team of the Month. On May 16, 2026, she scored a 90th-minute penalty in a 1–0 win over the Tampa Bay Sun as Lexington clinched the Players' Shield on the final day of the season. In the league final, she scored Lexington's third goal in a 3–1 win over the Carolina Ascent, sealing their victory in extra time as they became the first team to complete the league double.

McCain kicked off the 2026 season on a positive note, scoring in Lexington's season-opening win over Brooklyn FC and becoming the first player in USL Super League history to net 20 goals.

== Career statistics ==
=== Club ===
As of September 22, 2024

Club	Season	League			NWSL Challenge Cup		Total	
Club	Season	Division	Apps	Goals	Apps	Goals	Apps	Goals
Kanas City Current	2021	NWSL	15	0	1	0	16	0
Kanas City Current	2022	NWSL	10	0	7	1	17	1
Chicago Red Stars	2023	NWSL	1	0	1	0	2	0
Fort Lauderdale United FC	2024–25	USL Super League	23	10	—		23	10
Career total			30	5	9	1	58	11

== Honors and awards ==
Lexington SC

- USL Super League: 2025–26
- USL Super League Players' Shield: 2025–26

Individual

- USL Super League All-League First Team: 2024–25
- USL Super League All-League Second Team: 2025–26
- SEC Midfielder of the Year: 2020
- First-team All-SEC: 2020
- Second-team All-SEC: 2018
- SEC all-freshman team: 2017
