= Taylor Aylmer =

American soccer player (born 1998)

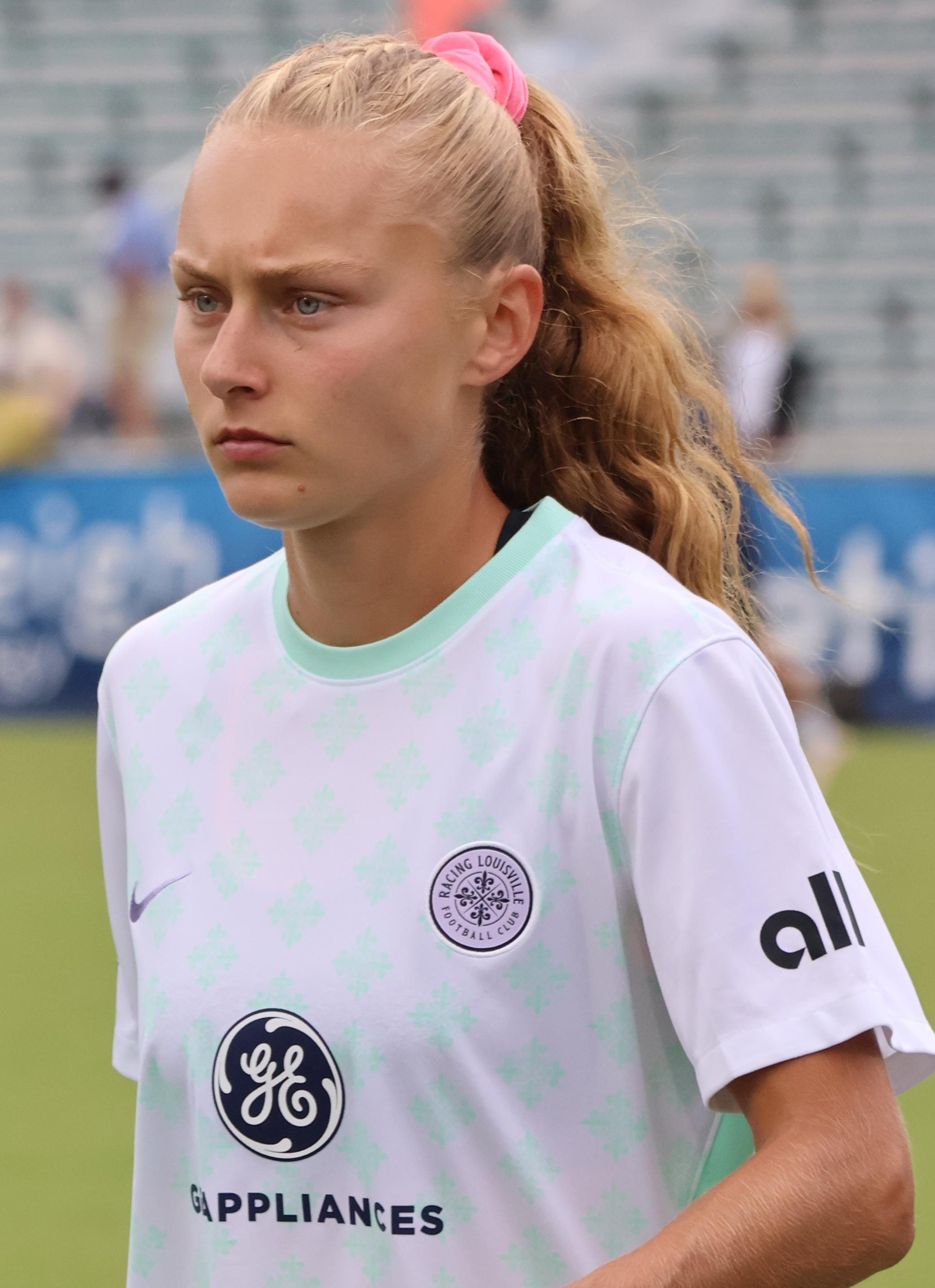
- Aylmer with Racing Louisville FC in 2023

Personal information
- Date of birth: September 23, 1998 (age 28)
- Place of birth: Garnerville, New York, U.S.
- Height: 1.72 m (5 ft 7 1/2 in)
- Position: Midfielder

Team information
- Current team: Lexington SC
- Number: 6

Youth career
- World Class FC

College career
Years	Team	Apps	(Gls)
2016–2019	Rutgers Scarlet Knights	85	(4)

Senior career*
Years	Team	Apps	(Gls)
2021	NJ/NY Gotham FC	0	(0)
2021–2022	Washington Spirit	22	(1)
2023	Åland United	11	(1)
2023	Racing Louisville	2	(0)
2024–2025	Spokane Zephyr	24	(4)
2025–	Lexington SC	28	(1)
- * Club domestic league appearances and goals as of May 16, 2026

Taylor Aylmer (born September 23, 1998) is an American professional soccer player who plays as a midfielder for USL Super League club Lexington SC, which she captains. She played college soccer for the Rutgers Scarlet Knights. She has previously played for NJ/NY Gotham FC, Washington Spirit, and Racing Louisville of the National Women's Soccer League (NWSL). She also played for Åland United in Finland and the Spokane Zephyr in the USL Super League.

== Early life ==
Raised in Garnerville, New York located north of New York City, Aylmer attended North Rockland High School where she played on the varsity team for four years and captained the team in 2015. The same year, she earned all-league, all-section, and all-state honors, and was named Player of the Year. Aylmer led the team to the state finals her junior and senior year.

Aylmer played for World Class FC in the Elite Clubs National League (ECNL). Excelling academically, she was named a 2015-16 NSCAA High School Scholar All-American and was a member of the National Honor Society and Math, Science, English, and Social Studies Honor Society.

== College career ==
Aylmer attended Rutgers University where she played for the Rutgers Scarlet Knights women's soccer team from 2016 to 2019. She captained the team in 2019 and co-captained in 2018. During her freshman year in 2016, she scored two goals and provided three assists in the 23 matches she played. She was named to the Big Ten Conference All-Freshman Team. In 2017, she was a starting midfielder in 19 of the team's 21 matches. She scored a penalty kick — the game winner — in a 4–0 win against Monmouth University. The same year, she as named 2017 Academic All-Big Ten for the first of three consecutive years. As a junior, Aylmer was named co-captain and starting midfielder in all 20 matches. As captain during her senior year, her nine assists ranked top on the team. She was named to the 2019 All-Region Second Team, All-Big Ten Third Team, Scholar All-Region Second Team and earned Big Ten Sportsmanship Award honors.

== Club career ==
Aylmer registered for the 2020 NWSL College Draft, but was not selected. NJ/NY Gotham FC invited Aylmer to its 2020 pre-season camp, but play was suspended due to the impact of the COVID-19 pandemic on sports. Washington Spirit invited Aylmer to train with the team during the 2020 NWSL Fall Series, but did not sign a contract with the club.

=== NJ/NY Gotham FC ===
Gotham FC signed Aylmer as a National Team Replacement Player in 2021. She made her professional debut on April 14, 2021, during a 1–0 win against Orlando Pride in the 2021 NWSL Challenge Cup. Gotham FC did not extend her contract beyond the national team replacement period.

=== Washington Spirit ===
Aylmer signed with the Spirit as a national team replacement player in the middle of the 2021 season, which the Spirit extended to a full contract for the remainder of the season on August 21, 2021. In her first regular-season start on October 17, 2021, Aylmer scored a match-winning chip goal against OL Reign, her first league goal. Aylmer made 10 appearances during the season, including starting in the Spirit's first-round playoff match win against North Carolina Courage on November 7, 2021; and as a substitute during the semi-final win against OL Reign on November 14; and as a substitute in the Spirit's 2021 championship finals victory.

The Spirit re-signed Aylmer to a one-year contract with an option for an additional year in December 2021. She participated in the 2022 NWSL Challenge Cup and started the championship game against the North Carolina Courage. During the match, Aylmer conceded an own goal, which proved to be the difference as the Courage won, 2–1. Despite making 15 appearances in 2022, the Spirit did not exercise Aylmer's contract option at the end of the season and waived her. Aylmer finished her Spirit career with 32 matches across all competitions.

=== Åland United ===
On April 1, Kansallinen Liiga club Åland United signed Aylmer for the 2023 season. She made 12 total appearances for the club, scoring one goal and one assist.

=== Racing Louisville FC ===
On July 20, 2023, NWSL club Racing Louisville FC signed Aylmer to a short-term national team replacement player contract. She made her Louisville debut in an NWSL Challenge Cup match against the Houston Dash on July 29. The very next match, Aylmer picked up a suspension after receiving two yellow cards in a loss to the Kansas City Current, although Louisville still managed to advanced to the Challenge Cup semifinals. Aylmer made two more appearances with Louisville, both in the regular season, before her short-term contract expired.

=== Spokane Zephyr FC ===
On May 21, 2024, Aylmer signed with Spokane Zephyr FC for the inaugural season of the USL Super League. She played in the team's inaugural match, a 1–1 draw with Brooklyn FC. Aylmer missed the following three games due to an injury, but in her return match, she scored her first goal with Spokane as the Zephyr drew with DC Power FC.

=== Lexington SC ===
Aylmer transferred to Lexington SC on July 2, 2025. She was named team captain for the 2025–26 season, debuting in the club's season-opening draw with Fort Lauderdale United on August 23. She earned first-team All-League honors after leading Lexington, who finished last the previous season, to win the Players' Shield with the best record in the league. In the playoffs, she captained the squad to a 3–1 win over the Carolina Ascent in the final, raising the trophy as Lexington become the first team to complete the league double.

== Honors and awards ==
Washington Spirit

- NWSL Championship: 2021

Lexington SC

- USL Super League: 2025–26
- USL Super League Players' Shield: 2025–26

Individual

- USL Super League All-League First Team: 2025–26
- Third-team All-Big Ten: 2019
- Big Ten all-freshman team: 2016
