= Allison Pantuso =

American soccer player (born 1997)

Personal information
- Full name: Allison Danielle Pantuso
- Date of birth: June 30, 1997 (age 29)
- Place of birth: Thousand Oaks, California, U.S.
- Height: 5 ft 11 in (1.80 m)
- Position: Center back

Team information
- Current team: Lexington SC
- Number: 3

Youth career
- Eagles SC

College career
Years	Team	Apps	(Gls)
2015–2018	Oregon State Beavers	71	(4)

Senior career*
Years	Team	Apps	(Gls)
2019–2020	FF Lugano	5	(2)
2020–2021	Issy	18	(0)
2021	KuPS	11	(2)
2022	IFK Kalmar	22	(2)
2024–2025	Brooklyn FC	28	(1)
2025–	Lexington SC	27	(2)
- * Club domestic league appearances and goals as of May 16, 2026

Allison Danielle Pantuso (born June 30, 1997) is an American professional soccer player who plays as a center back for USL Super League club Lexington SC. Pantuso played college soccer for the Oregon State Beavers before starting her professional career overseas, playing for European clubs FF Lugano, Issy, KuPS, and IFK Kalmar. She has also previously played for Brooklyn FC.

== Early life ==
Pantuso was born and raised in Thousand Oaks, California, as one of two children of Nick and Kelly Pantuso. She started her soccer career as a midfielder and captained both her Oaks Christian High school team and Eagles SC club team. With Oaks Christian, Pantuso helped the squad win the CIF Southern California title in her junior year and second place as a senior. She was twice named to the All-Maramonte League First Team and once to the Division 2 First Team.

== College career ==
Pantuso played four seasons with the Oregon State Beavers soccer program. She had a splashy start to her OSU career, tallying a brace in her collegiate debut on August 21, 2015. She also scored an overtime match-winner against Kansas, helping Oregon State secure victory in their first ever match against the Jayhawks. Additionally, she contributed 3 assists despite never earning a start in her freshman year.

Pantuso's role soon grew, and she started all of Oregon State's matches in her next two seasons of play. She was a Pac-12 Academic Honorable Mention in both years and was the Pac-12 Defensive Player of the Week in October 2017. As a senior, Pantuso bagged the OSU captaincy and also earned MVP honors. She also was named to the Pac-12 All-Academic Second Team. In the end, Pantuso made 71 appearances and scored 4 goals in her time as a Beaver.

== Club career ==
=== European beginnings ===
In June 2019, Pantuso signed her first professional contract with FF Lugano 1976 in the Swiss Women's Super League, inking a one-year deal. She made multiple appearances as a member of Lugano, including two in the UEFA Women's Champions League. Pantuso scored her first two professional goals with the Swiss club, including one in a 2–0 victory over BSC YB Frauen.

In 2020, Pantuso went on to move clubs and play for French first-division side GPSO 92 Issy for one season. She starred in 18 league matches as Issy fought to avoid relegation to the Seconde Ligue. On July 6, 2021, Pantuso signed with KuPS of the Finnish Kansallinen Liiga. She was brought in as an intended replacement for injured teammate Emmaliina Tulkki. Pantuso played in 11 matches for KuPS and managed to score twice.

=== IFK Kalmar ===
Pantuso then joined Damallsvenskan club IFK Kalmar. She scored her first goal with the club on April 1, 2022, netting a header in a 3–1 win over AIK. During her time in Kalmar, she consumed canrenone from a doctor-prescribed medication and was subsequently dealt an 18-month doping suspension. Pantuso, who had previously received suspension exemption in other countries, managed to shorten her sentence to 6 months. She completed the remainder of her suspension in the United States.

=== Brooklyn FC ===
On July 25, 2024, Pantuso signed with American club Brooklyn FC ahead of the inaugural USL Super League season. She tallied her first USLS goal on October 15, outjumping Carolina Ascent FC defender Sydney Studer to score in a 1–1 draw with the Ascent. At the end of December 2024, Pantuso was named to the USL Super League Team of the Month after winning 12 duels and recording a passing accuracy of 80%. She completed her single season with Brooklyn as an Iron woman, playing every minute of the 28-game campaign.

=== Lexington SC ===
Pantuso signed with USL Super League club Lexington SC on June 30, 2025. She debuted for the club on August 23, playing all 90 minutes and scoring a goal in Lexington's opening-day draw with Fort Lauderdale United FC. She missed just one match as Lexington posted the best defense in the league and won the Players' Shield with the best record. After the season, she earned first-team All-League honors and was named the USL Super League Defender of the Year. In the playoffs, she helped Lexington win the league championship, becoming the first team to complete the league double.

== Career statistics ==
=== Club ===
As of June 5, 2026

Appearances and goals by club, season and competition
Club	Season	League			Cup		Playoffs		Continental		Total	
Club	Season	Division	Apps	Goals	Apps	Goals	Apps	Goals	Apps	Goals	Apps	Goals
FF Lugano 1976	2019–20	Swiss Women's Super League	5	2	—		—		2 (Note: Appearances in the UEFA Champions League)	0	7	2
GPSO 92 Issy	2020–21	Division 1 Féminine	18	0	1 (Note: Appearances in the Coupe de France)	0	—		—		19	0
KuPS	2021	Kansallinen Liiga	11	2	—		—		—		11	2
IFK Kalmar	2022	Damallsvenskan	22	2	1 (Note: Appearances in the Svenska Cupen)	0	—		—		23	2
Brooklyn FC	2024–25	USL Super League	28	1	—		—		—		28	1
Lexington SC	2025–26	USL Super League	27	2	—		2	0	—		29	2
Career total			111	9	2	0	2	0	2	0	117	9

== Honors and awards ==
Lexington SC

- USL Super League: 2025–26
- USL Super League Players' Shield: 2025–26

Individual

- USL Super League Defender of the Year: 2025–26
- USL Super League All-League First Team: 2025–26
