= Alyssa Bourgeois =

American soccer player (born 2002)

Personal information
- Date of birth: May 15, 2002 (age 24)
- Height: 5 ft 3 in (1.60 m)
- Position: Right back

Team information
- Current team: Lexington SC
- Number: 12

Youth career
- NEFC Development Academy

College career
| Years | Team | Apps | (Gls) |
| 2020 | Boston University Terriers | 5 | (0) |
| 2021–2023 | Santa Clara Broncos | 51 | (1) |

Senior career*
| Years | Team | Apps | (Gls) |
| 2024 | California Storm | 8 | (2) |
| 2024–2025 | Spokane Zephyr | 24 | (0) |
| 2025– | Lexington SC | 28 | (2) |
- * Club domestic league appearances and goals as of May 16, 2026

Alyssa Bourgeois (born May 15, 2002) is an American professional soccer player who plays as a right back for USL Super League club Lexington SC. She played college soccer for the Boston University Terriers and the Santa Clara Broncos and was selected by the Houston Dash in the fourth round of the 2024 NWSL Draft. She has previously played for Spokane Zephyr FC.

== Early life ==
Bourgeois grew up in Maynard, Massachusetts, where she played club soccer for NEFC Development Academy. Joining the Maynard High School team in 8th grade, Bourgeois played as a midfielder and was a prolific offensive threat. As a freshman, Bourgeois was crowned team and all-league MVP. She also received recognition at the state and regional levels.

== College career ==
Bourgeois started her collegiate career with the Boston University Terriers. She made her first start with the Terriers on March 13, 2021, playing a full 90 minutes in a victory over Colgate. The following match, Bourgeois helped Boston secure a shutout victory over Holy Cross and was named the Patriot League Rookie of the Week for her efforts. She ended up totaling 5 appearances in one season with the Terriers.

After finishing up her year in Boston, Bourgeois transferred to Santa Clara University and played on the Broncos women's soccer team from 2021 to 2023. She helped the team reach NCAA Tournament in all three seasons, including in 2021, where the Broncos reached the semifinals before being eliminated by BYU on penalties. As a senior, Bourgeois scored her first college goal in the first round of the tournament, contributing to a 3–0 victory over Arizona State. She was later named an honorable mention on the 2023 All-WCC team. Bourgeois departed the program having played in 51 matches, including all 21 fixtures in her junior and senior seasons. She also recorded 6 career assists.

== Club career ==
=== Spokane Zephyr ===
Bourgeois was selected by the Houston Dash in the 4th round of the 2024 NWSL Draft, becoming the 47th overall pick of the league's final college draft. She was a member of the Dash's preseason roster but ultimately did not sign with the club before the start of the season.

On June 7, 2024, Bourgeois signed her first professional contract with USL Super League team Spokane Zephyr FC ahead of the club's inaugural season of play. She played in all four of Spokane's first matches a franchise, including the team's inaugural game, which was a 1–1 draw with Fort Lauderdale United FC. She made 24 appearances in her lone season with Spokane, helping the defense earn multiple clean sheets en route to a fifth-place finish.

=== Lexington SC ===
Bourgeois transferred to Lexington SC in June 2025. She debuted for the club on August 23, starting and playing all 90 minutes of Lexington's season-opening draw with Fort Lauderdale United FC. On February 7, 2026, Bourgeois scored her first professional goal, a long ball misplayed by opposing goalkeeper Meagan McClelland in a 2–1 win over the Carolina Ascent. In May 2026, Bourgeois earned her first USL Super League Team of the Month honor after sporting the second-highest number of duels won in the league across April. In her first season with Lexington, she helped the club win the league championship and the Players' Shield, making them the first team to complete the league double.

Bourgeois started her third professional season on a positive note, earning a spot on the August Super League Team of the Month as bench player.

== Personal life ==
Bourgeois has three siblings. Her older brother, Harrison Bourgeois, played three seasons with the Bentley Falcons soccer team.

== Career statistics ==
=== Club ===
As of February 8, 2026

Appearances and goals by club, season and competition
| Club | Season | League | | | Playoffs | | Total | |
| Club | Season | Division | Apps | Goals | Apps | Goals | Apps | Goals |
|---|---|---|---|---|---|---|---|---|
| Spokane Zephyr FC | 2024–25 | USL Super League | 24 | 0 | — | | 24 | 0 |
| Lexington SC | 2025–26 | USL Super League | 16 | 1 | — | | 16 | 1 |
| Career total | | | 40 | 1 | 0 | 0 | 40 | 1 |

== Honors ==
Lexington SC

- USL Super League: 2025–26
- USL Super League Players' Shield: 2025–26
