= Lexington SC Stadium =

Stadium in Lexington, Kentucky

- Location within Kentucky Location within the United States
- Interactive map of Lexington SC Stadium
- Address: 200 Shives Drive; Lexington, Kentucky; U.S.
- Coordinates: 37.962°N 84.392°W
- Capacity: 7,500
- Surface: Grass
- Acreage: 30 acres

Construction
- Groundbreaking: October 10, 2023
- Opened: September 8, 2024
- Cost: $82,000,000 USD
- Architect: Gensler
- Builder: Stadium Structures

Tenants
- Lexington SC (USLC) 2024–present Lexington SC Women (USLS) 2024–present

Lexington SC Stadium is a soccer-specific stadium in Lexington, Kentucky. The stadium is home to Lexington SC's men's and women's teams, playing in the USL Championship and the USL Super League, respectively. The stadium has a capacity of 7,500, with the ability to be expanded to 11,000 with renovations.

== History ==
=== Planning and previous iterations ===
Originally, the team had plans for a downtown stadium as a part of the Lexington Center Corporation's High Street Development Project. The proposed location for the facility was in the heart of downtown, directly across the street from Central Bank Center and Rupp Arena, a multi-purpose venue that hosts the Kentucky Wildcats men's basketball team, concerts, conventions, and shows. However, the team later withdrew this proposal and looked for other locations.

It was later announced that the stadium would be built in its current location in October 2023, after a city council meeting voted to allow a zoning change to the area to allow for stadium construction. The new stadium, part of a larger complex that will house the club's youth fields, was to be built off of Athens–Boonesboro Road near Interstate 75.

=== Construction and opening ===
Construction took place between October 2023 to August 2024, being completed with a capacity of 7,500 but with the possibility of expansion to 11,000.

The stadium opened on September 8, 2024, with a USL Super League match between Lexington SC Women and Tampa Bay Sun FC. In the first match played in stadium history, the home team lost 3–2.
