= 2024–25 Lexington SC (women) season =

Inaugural Lexington SC season

Lexington SC
2024–25 season
- Owners: Bill and Donna Shively; Stephen Dawahare
- Head coach: Sam Stockley
- Stadium: Lexington SC Stadium; Lexington, Kentucky
- USLSL: 8th
- Top goalscorer: Madison Parsons (5 goals)
- Highest home attendance: 3,946 (v Tampa Bay) (September 8, 2024)
- Lowest home attendance: 476 (v Dallas (April 6, 2025)
- Average home league attendance: 1,468
- Biggest win: 3–0 (vs DC Power FC (H), December 14, 2024)
- Biggest defeat: 2–6 (vs Dallas Trinity FC (A), September 13, 2024); 0–4 (vs Carolina Ascent FC (H), March 23, 2025)
Home colours	Away colours
- All statistics correct as of April 26, 2025.

The 2024–25 Lexington SC season was the inaugural USL Super League season, in which Lexington is a founding club. The league is a D1 women's professional soccer league that competes during the "European Calendar" from August until June, with taking a break in the winter similar to Germany.

== Staff ==
Position	Name
Interim head coach	(England) Sam Stockley
Assistant Coach (Goalkeeping)	(United States) Ben Willis
Head of Performance	(United States) Mesa McNely
Director of Player Management & Operations	(United States) Sly Yates
Equipment Manager	(United States) Dani Roberts

== Season squad ==
Squad No.	Name	Nationality	Date of birth (age)
Goalkeepers
00	Taiana Tolleson	(United States)	April 24, 1998 (26)
1	Sarah Cox	(United States)	February 16, 1994 (30)
21	Bridgette Skiba	(United States)	October 20, 1999 (24)
Defenders
4	Trinity Watson	(United States)	March 24, 2000 (24)
5	Maddy Perez	(United States)	June 6, 2002 (22)
7	Shin Na-yeong	(South Korea)	October 9, 1999 (24)
14	Maithé López	(Colombia)	January 24, 2007 (22)
20	Autumn Weeks	(United States)	October 20, 2001 (22)
22	Sydney Shepherd	(United States)	January 13, 2000 (24)
26	Yunaira López	(Colombia)	December 4, 2004 (20)
Midfielders
8	Grace Wisnewski	(New Zealand)	June 28, 2002 (21)
10	Libby Moore	(United States)	January 19, 2001 (24)
11	Nicole Vernis	(United States)	January 15, 2001 (24)
12	Marykate McGuire	(United States)	March 4, 2000 (24)
18	Natalie Higgins	(United States)	August 28, 1996 (28)
25	Shea Moyer	(United States)	December 28, 1998 (25)
29	Sintia Cabezas	(Colombia)	May 1, 2006 (18)
30	Maci Barlow	(United States)	May 17, 2009 (15)
33	Emma Johnson	(United States)	July 20, 2007 (17)
42	Claire Winter	(United States)	March 21, 1995 (29)
Forwards
2	Kailey Utley	(United States)	December 17, 1992 (30)
2	Hannah White	(United States)	January 15, 2001 (24)
9	Elysia Laramie	(United States)	August 23, 2000 (23)
13	Hannah Richardson	(United States)	May 28, 2000 (24)
15	Madison Parsons	(United States)	December 6, 2000 (23)
16	Julie Mackin	(United States)	February 15, 1997 (27)
17	Cori Sullivan	(United States)	October 17, 1999 (24)
23	Jennifer "JJ" Aalbue	(United States)	August 21, 2001 (22)
24	Courtney Jones	(United States)	July 27, 1998 (25)
36	Kate Doyle	(United States)	October 16, 2001 (23)

Last updated: April 6, 2025.
Source: Lexington SC

== Transfers ==
=== In ===
Pos.	Player	Signed from	Details	Date	Ref.
MF	(New Zealand) Grace Wisnewski	(New Zealand) Wellington Phoenix FC	Free Transfer	June 17, 2024	
FW	(United States) Marykate McGuire	(United States) Ole Miss Rebels	Free Transfer	June 17, 2024	
FW/DF	(United States) Elysia Laramie	(United States) Long Beach State	Free Transfer	June 19, 2024	
MF	(United States) Kimberly Mendez	(Serbia) ŽFK Mašinac PZP Niš	Free Transfer	June 19, 2024	
MF	(United States) Alyssa Frazier	(Poland) AP Orlen Gdańsk	Free Transfer	June 21, 2024	
MF	(United States) Natalie Higgins	(Finland) Helsingin Palloseura	Free Transfer	June 21, 2024	
MF	(United States) Madison Parsons	(United States) Yuba FC	Free Transfer	June 24, 2024	
FW	(Norway) Madelen Holme	(Germany) SV Meppen	Free Transfer	June 24, 2024	
MF	(United States) Natalie Turner-Wyatt	(United States) Downtown United SC	Free Transfer	June 26, 2024	
MF	(United States) Emmi Dunn	(Finland) Nurmijärven Jalkapalloseura	Free Transfer	June 26, 2024	
FW	(United States) Courtney Jones	(United States) Greenville Liberty SC	Free Transfer	June 28, 2024	
FW	(United States) Julie Mackin	(United States) Greenville Liberty SC	Free Transfer	June 28, 2024	
DF	(United States) Madison Perez	(United States) Long Beach State	Free Transfer	July 1, 2024	
FW	(United States) Kailey Utley	(United States) Lexington SC (USLW)	Free Transfer	July 1, 2024	
DF	(United States) Trinity Watson	(United States) Lexington SC (USLW)	Free Transfer	July 2, 2024	
GK	(United States) Sarah Cox	(United States) Miss Kick FC	Free Transfer	July 2, 2024	
DF	(United States) Autumn Weeks	(United States) Lexington SC (USLW)	Free Transfer	July 3, 2024	
FW	(United States) Jennifer "JJ" Aalbue	(United States) Lexington SC (USLW)	Free Transfer	July 3, 2024	
GK	(United States) Taiana Tolleson	(United States) Tennessee SC (USLW)	Free Transfer	July 5, 2024	
FW	(United States) Cori Sullivan	(Scotland) Glasgow City F.C.	Free Transfer	July 5, 2024	
GK	(United States) Bridgette Skiba	(Denmark) HB Køge	Free Transfer	July 8, 2024	
FW	(United States) Hannah Richardson	(Denmark) HB Køge	Free Transfer	July 8, 2024	
MF	(United States) Shea Moyer	(Turkey) Fomget Gençlik ve Spor	Free Transfer	July 11, 2024	
DF	(South Korea) Shin Na-yeong	(South Korea) Hwacheon KSPO WFC	Free Transfer	July 11, 2024	
DF	(United States) Sydney Shepherd	(United States) Oakland Soul SC	Upgraded from Trialist	August 21, 2024	
FW	(Canada) Amanda Allen	(United States) Orlando Pride	Loan for the 2024 season	September 5, 2024	
MF	(United States) Claire Winter	(United States) Orlando Pride	Free Transfer	September 26, 2024	
FW	(United States) Hannah White	(United States) Georgia Bulldogs	Free Transfer	January 20, 2025	
DF	(Colombia) Sintia Cabezas	(United States) San Diego Wave	Loan for the remainder of 2025	January 20, 2025	
MF	(United States) Nicole Vernis	(United States) Georgia Bulldogs	Free Transfer	January 20, 2025	
DF	(Colombia) Yunaira López	Unattached	Free Transfer	January 22, 2025	
FW	(United States) Kate Doyle	(United States) Arkansas Razorbacks	Free Transfer	January 29, 2025	
MF	(United States) Libby Moore	(United States) North Carolina Tar Heels	Free Transfer	February 11, 2025	

=== Out ===
Pos.	Player	Destination Club	Date	Ref.
MF	(United States) Kimberly Mendez	TBD	January 23, 2025	
FW	(Norway) Madelen Holme	TBD	January 23, 2025	
FW	(United States) Kailey Utley	TBD	Unknown	
DF	(United States) Alyssa Frazier	TBD	Unknown	
MF	(United States) Emmi Dunn	TBD	March 31, 2025	
MF	(United States) Natalie Turner-Wyatt	TBD	Unknown	

== Competitions ==
=== Preseason ===
August 3, 2024 Exhibition	Kentucky Wildcats	Not reported	Lexington SC	Lexington, KY
		Report		Stadium: Wendell & Vickie Bell Soccer Complex

August 12, 2024 Exhibition	Lexington SC	Not Reported	Cumberlands Patriots	Lexington, KY
		Report		Stadium: Not reported

August 20, 2024 Exhibition	Centre Colonels	Not Reported	Lexington SC	Danville, Kentucky
		Report		Stadium: Andrew P. Amend Field

=== Standings ===
Pos	Team	Pld	W	L	T	GF	GA	GD	Pts	Qualification
4	Fort Lauderdale United	28	11	8	9	35	33	+2	42 (Note: Head-to-head points: Fort Lauderdale 6, Spokane 3)	Playoffs
5	Spokane Zephyr	28	11	8	9	37	32	+5	42	
6	Brooklyn	28	10	9	9	30	34	−4	39	
7	DC Power	28	5	14	9	24	41	−17	24	
8	Lexington	28	4	18	6	29	62	−33	18	

Source: USL Super League
Rules for classification: 1) head-to-head points; 2) total goal differential; 3) total goals scored; 4) disciplinary points; 5) drawing of lots.

==== Results by round ====
Round	1	2	3	4	5	6	7	8	9	10	11	12	13	14	15	16	17	18	19	20	21	22	23	24	25	26	27	28
Stadium	A	H	A	H	A	H	A	A	A	A	H	H	H	H	A	A	H	A	H	H	A	A	A	A	A	H	H	A
Result	D	L	L	L	L	D	W	W	L	L	L	D	L	W	L	L	D	W	L	L	L	D	L	L	L	L	L	D
Position	5	7	8	8	8	8	8	7	8	8	8	8	8	8	8	8	8	6	7	7	8	7	8	8	8	8	8	8

Updated to match(es) played on April 26, 2025. Source: Match reports
A = Away; H = Home; W = Win; D = Draw; L = Loss

==== Results summary ====
Overall								Home						Away					
Pld	W	D	L	GF	GA	GD	Pts	W	D	L	GF	GA	GD	W	D	L	GF	GA	GD
27	4	5	18	26	59	−33	17	1	3	9	10	28	−18	3	2	9	16	31	−15

Last updated: May 16, 2025.
Source: USLSuperLeague.com

Matches

August 25, 2024 1	Carolina Ascent FC	1–1	Lexington SC	Charlotte, North Carolina
2:30 PM EST	Studer (yellow card) 56'; Corbin 76'	Report	Parsons (yellow card) 1'; Yeong (yellow card) 15'; Shepherd 48' (Perez)	Stadium: American Legion Memorial Stadium; Attendance: 2.058; Referee: Anya Voigt

September 8, 2024 2	Lexington SC	2–3	Tampa Bay Sun FC	Lexington, Kentucky
4:00 PM EST	Parsons 57' (Perez); McGuire 83'	Report	Nasello (yellow card) 19'; Giammona 19'; Staude 20'; Soale (yellow card) 56'; Clark 79'; Bessette (yellow card) 86'	Stadium: Lexington SC Stadium; Attendance: 3,946; Referee: Danielle Chesky
Note: Inaugural match at Lexington SC Stadium with the largest home crowd ever for Lexington SC across all competitions and teams.

September 13, 2024 3	Dallas Trinity FC	6–2	Lexington SC	Dallas, Texas
8:00 PM EST	Hintzen (yellow card) 17'; Thornton 33', 78', 90+4'; Brooks 45+2'; Ubogagu 56', 67'	Report	Utley 7'; Richardson (yellow card) 32'; Parsons 52'	Stadium: Cotton Bowl; Attendance: 2,961; Referee: Jaclyn Metz

September 22, 2024 4	Lexington SC	1–3	Fort Lauderdale United FC	Lexington, Kentucky
4:00 PM EST	Shepherd (yellow card) 37', (goal) 59'; Weeks (yellow card) 45+4'	Report	McCain 22', 57', 90' (pen.); Gordon (yellow card) 49'; Komani (yellow card) 81'; Gourley (yellow card) 83'	Stadium: Lexington SC Stadium; Attendance: 1,539; Referee: Iryna Petrunok

September 28, 2024 5	Brooklyn FC	1–0	Lexington SC	New York, New York
7:30 PM EST	Presley (yellow card) 33'; Cox 47'; Kroeger (yellow card) 56'	Report	Winter (yellow card) 48'; Parsons (yellow card) 76'; Weeks (yellow card) 90'	Stadium: Commisso Soccer Stadium; Attendance: 951; Referee: Marie Durr
Note: Match originally scheduled to be played at Maimonides Park but moved due to playing field issues.

October 6, 2024 6	Lexington SC	1–1	Carolina Ascent FC	Lexington, Kentucky
4:00 PM EST	Mendez 90+10'	Report	Perez 37' (o.g.); Studer (yellow card) 45+2'; DeMarco (yellow card) 45+3'; Serepca (yellow card) 90+3'	Stadium: Lexington SC Stadium; Attendance: 1,496; Referee: Adorae Monroy

October 13, 2024 7	Spokane Zephyr FC	2–3	Lexington SC	Spokane, Washington
5:00 PM EST	Jaskaniec 37'; Ekić 58'; Bourgeois (yellow card) 90+7'	Report	Moyer 18'; McGuire 48'; Courtney Jones (yellow card) 59'; Shepherd 90+4'	Stadium: One Spokane Stadium; Attendance: 2,314; Referee: Kelsey Harms

October 19, 2024 8	Fort Lauderdale United FC	1–2	Lexington SC	Fort Lauderdale, Florida
7:30 PM EST	McCain 22'; Komani (yellow card) 59'	Report	Parsons 37', 71'	Stadium: FTL UTD Stadium; Attendance: 2,139; Referee: Melinda Sopka Homa

October 25, 2024 9	DC Power FC	2–1	Lexington SC	Washington, D.C.
8:00 PM EST	Flanagan 52', 90'	Report	McGuire 39'; Yeong (yellow card) 66'	Stadium: Audi Field; Attendance: 1,561; Referee: Jamie Padilla
Note: Match originally scheduled for October 27

November 2, 2024 10	Tampa Bay Sun FC	3–1	Lexington SC	Tampa, Florida
7:00 PM EST	Fløe 52', 85'; Flint 90+2'	Report	Shepherd 67'	Stadium: Riverfront Stadium; Attendance: 2,925; Referee: Alexandra Billeter

November 9, 2024 11	Lexington SC	2–3	Dallas Trinity FC	Lexington, Kentucky
7:00 PM EST	Parsons 14'; Weeks (yellow card) 37'; Moyer 51' (pen.)	Report	Brooks (yellow card) 35'; Hintzen 81'; Davison (yellow card) 86'; Danielsson 89'; Brian 90'	Stadium: Lexington SC Stadium; Attendance: 1,868; Referee: Calin Radosav

November 13, 2024 12	Lexington SC	1–1	Spokane Zephyr FC	Lexington, Kentucky
7:00 PM EST	McGuire 86'	Report	Ekić 26' (pen.); Bourgeois (yellow card) 65'; Viggiano (yellow card) 71'	Stadium: Lexington SC Stadium; Attendance: 1,342; Referee: Benjamin Meyer

December 7, 2024 13	Lexington SC	0–3	Brooklyn FC	Lexington, Kentucky
7:00 PM EST	Yeong (yellow card) 84'	Report	George 13' (yellow card) 58'; Scarpelli (yellow card) 40'; Garziano 59'; Elmore (yellow card) 88'; Scheriff 90+2'	Stadium: Lexington SC Stadium; Attendance: 1,148; Referee: Trevor Wiseman

December 14, 2024 14	Lexington SC	3–0	DC Power FC	Lexington, Kentucky
12:00 PM EST	Richardson 45+1', 58'; Wisnewski 56'	Report	Guillou (yellow card) 81'	Stadium: Lexington SC Stadium; Attendance: 1,340; Referee: Eric Tattersall

February 15, 2025 15	Carolina Ascent FC	2–1	Lexington SC	Charlotte, North Carolina
7:00 PM EST	Perez 3' (o.g.); Corbin 35'; Bedoya (yellow card) 90+4'	Report	Cabezas (yellow card) 30'; Richardson 82'; Moyer (yellow card) 85'	Stadium: American Legion Memorial Stadium; Attendance: 1,817; Referee: Alexandra Billeter

February 22, 2025 16	Fort Lauderdale United FC	2–0	Lexington SC	Fort Lauderdale, Florida
7:30 PM ET	McCain 49'; Hamid 62'; Lindahl (yellow card) 86'; Vaka (yellow card) 90+4'	Report	Winter (yellow card) 30'	Stadium: FTL UTD Stadium; Attendance: 2,624; Referee: Brad Jensen

March 1, 2025 17	Lexington SC	0–0	Brooklyn FC	Lexington, Kentucky
		Report	Yaple (yellow card) 58'	Stadium: Lexington SC Stadium; Attendance: 1,147; Referee: Shawn Tehini

March 9, 2025 18	DC Power FC	1–2	Lexington SC	Washington D.C.
	Geinore 85'	Report	Mackin 23'; Shepherd (yellow card) 30'; Hannah White 60'	Stadium: Audi Field; Attendance: 1,551; Referee: John Griggs

March 23, 2025 20	Lexington SC	0–4	Carolina Ascent FC	Lexington, Kentucky
	Yeong (yellow card) 48'	Report	Parker 2' (yellow card) 53'; Corbin 19'; Harding 26'	Stadium: Lexington SC Stadium; Attendance: 693; Referee: Stephanie McFarland

April 6, 2025 19	Lexington SC	0–3	Dallas Trinity FC	Lexington, Kentucky
	Brooks 36' (pen.) (yellow card) 40'; Hintzen 63'; Wagner (yellow card) 71'; Brian 83'	Report		Stadium: Lexington SC Stadium; Attendance: 476; Referee: Marie Durr
Note: Match was originally scheduled for March 15, 2024, but was postponed due to inclement weather.

April 12, 2025 21	Tampa Bay Sun FC	4–1	Lexington SC	Tampa Bay, Florida
	Nasello 36'; Fløe (yellow card) 37' (goal) 45+2'; Giammona 43'; Keane 90'	Report	Moore (yellow card) 23'; López (yellow card) 57'; Vernis 58'; Mackin 71'	Stadium: Riverfront Stadium; Attendance: Not reported Referee: Atahan Yaya

April 16, 2025 22	Lexington SC	0–3	Spokane Zephyr	Lexington, Kentucky
4:00 PM ET		Report	Cummings 6', (yellow card) 44'; Ekic 13' 50'	Stadium: Lexington SC Stadium; Attendance: 1,157; Referee: Matthew Thompson

April 19, 2025 23	Brooklyn FC	1–1	Lexington SC	Brooklyn, New York
	Grabias 60'	Report	Watson (yellow card) 3'; Moyer (yellow card) 19'; López 41' (yellow card) 52'; Grabias (yellow card) 74'	Stadium: Maimonides Park; Attendance: Not reported Referee: Gloria Martinez

April 26, 2025 24	Dallas Trinity FC	3–1	Lexington SC	Dallas, Texas
8:00 PM ET	Bolt 5'; Strawn 70'; Walker (yellow card) 84'; Thornton 90+3'	Report	Vernis (yellow card) 26'; Perez (yellow card) 50'; Hannah White 69'	Stadium: Cotton Bowl; Attendance: 4,753; Referee: Iryna Petrunok

May 3, 2025 25	Spokane Zephyr	2–0	Lexington SC	Spokane, Washington
6:00 PM PDT	Ekic 11' (pen.); Cook 50'; Weinert (yellow card) 86'	Report	López (yellow card) 59'	Stadium: One Spokane Stadium; Attendance: 2,158; Referee: Lauren Aldrich

May 10, 2025 26	Lexington SC	0–3	Tampa Bay Sun FC	Lexington, Kentucky
	Mackin (yellow card) 11'	Report	Haugen 45'; Goins 60'; Fløe 90+2'	Stadium: Lexington SC Stadium; Attendance: 2,259; Referee: Edson Carvajal

May 16, 2025 27	Lexington SC	0–1	Fort Lauderdale United FC	Lexington, Kentucky
7:00 PM EST		Report	Aalbue 17' (o.g.); Locklear (yellow card) 58'; Ansbrow (yellow card) 90+1'; McCain (yellow card) 90+4'	Stadium: Lexington SC Stadium; Attendance: 1,015; Referee: Nabil Bensalah

May 31, 2025 28	Lexington SC	3–3	DC Power FC	Lexington, Kentucky
7:00 PM EST	Vernis 13'; Parsons 50'; Perez 68'; Jones (yellow card) 70'	Report	Gourley 5', 42' (yellow card) 70'; Geinore 17'; Konte (yellow card) 19'; Stringer (yellow card) 55'; Kurosaki (yellow card) 70'; Murnin (yellow card) 89'	Stadium: Lexington SC Stadium; Attendance: 2,003; Referee: Rachel Swett

== Statistics ==
=== Appearances ===
Numbers outside parentheses denote appearances as starter.
Numbers in parentheses denote appearances as substitute.

Players with no appearances are not included on the list, italics indicate a loaned in player

As of match played May 3, 2025

No.	Nat.	Player	Regular Season	Playoffs	Total
Goalkeepers
1	(United States)	Sarah Cox	15	0	15
21	(United States)	Bridgette Skiba	10	0	10
Defenders
4	(United States)	Trinity Watson	6(1)	0	7
5	(United States)	Maddy Perez	22	0	22
7	(South Korea)	Shin Na-yeong	15(2)	0	17
20	(United States)	Autumn Weeks	9(7)	0	16
22	(United States)	Sydney Shepherd	16(2)	0	18
26	(Colombia)	Yunaira López	0(1)	0	1
29	(Colombia)	Sintia Cabezas	2(3)	0	5
33	(United States)	Emma Johnson	6(8)	0	14
Midfielders
8	(New Zealand)	Grace Wisnewski	4(7)	0	11
10	(United States)	Libby Moore	7(3)	0	10
11	(United States)	Nicole Vernis	10	0	10
12	(United States)	Marykate McGuire	11(6)	0	17
14	(Colombia)	Maithé López	6	0	6
25	(United States)	Shea Moyer (c)	25	0	25
30	(United States)	Maci Barlow	0(2)	0	2
42	(United States)	Claire Winter	14	0	14
Forwards
2	(United States)	Hannah White	10(1)	0	11
13	(United States)	Hannah Richardson	13(5)	0	18
15	(United States)	Madison Parsons	21(4)	0	25
16	(United States)	Julie Mackin	15(6)	0	21
17	(United States)	Cori Sullivan	3(7)	0	10
23	(United States)	Jennifer "JJ" Aalbue	0(5)	0	5
24	(United States)	Courtney Jones	16	0	16
36	(United States)	Kate Doyle	6(3)	0	9
Other (departed during the season)
2	(United States)	Kailey Utley	5(9)	0	14
3	(United States)	Alyssa Frazier	0(2)	0	2
10	(United States)	Kimberly Mendez	1(7)	0	8
11	(Norway)	Madelen Holme	0(1)	0	1
18	?	Higgins	0(2)	0	2
19	(United States)	Natalie Turner-Wyatt	0(5)	0	5
29	(Canada)	Amanda Allen	9	0	9

=== Goals ===
No.	Nat.	Name	Regular season	Playoffs	Total
15	(United States)	Madison Parsons	5	0	5
22	(United States)	Sydney Shepherd	4	0	4
12	(United States)	Marykate McGuire	4	0	4
13	(United States)	Hannah Richardson	3	0	3
25	(United States)	Shea Moyer	2	0	2
2	(United States)	Kailey Utley	1	0	1
10	(United States)	Kimberly Mendez	1	0	1
8	(New Zealand)	Grace Wisnewski	1	0	1
16	(United States)	Julie Mackin	1	0	1
2	(United States)	Hannah White	1	0	1
11	(United States)	Nicole Vernis	1	0	1
14	(Colombia)	Maithé López	1	0	1
2	(United States)	Hannah White	1	0	1
Own goals			1	0	1
Total			27	0	27

=== Assists ===
No.	Nat.	Name	Regular Season	Playoffs	Total
5	(United States)	Madison Perez	5	0	5
15	(United States)	Madison Parsons	5	0	5
25	(United States)	Shea Moyer	5	0	5
2	(United States)	Kailey Utley	2	0	2
1	(United States)	Sarah Cox	1	0	1
20	(United States)	Autumn Weeks	1	0	1
Total			19	0	19

=== Clean sheets ===
No.	Nat.	Name	Regular Season	Playoffs	Total
1	(United States)	Sarah Cox	1	0	1
21	(United States)	Bridgette Skiba	1	0	1
Total			2	0	2

=== Disciplinary cards ===
Player			Regular Season			Playoffs			Total		
No.	Nat.	Name	Booked	(yellow card) (yellow-red card)	Sent off (straight red)	Booked	(yellow card) (yellow-red card)	Sent off (straight red)	Booked	(yellow card) (yellow-red card)	Sent off (straight red)
7	(South Korea)	Shin Na-yeong	4	0	0	0	0	0	4	0	0
20	(United States)	Autumn Weeks	3	0	0	0	0	0	3	0	0
13	(United States)	Sydney Shepherd	2	0	0	0	0	0	2	0	0
25	(United States)	Shea Moyer	2	0	0	0	0	0	2	0	0
14	(Colombia)	Maithé López	3	0	0	0	0	0	3	0	0
16	(United States)	Julie Mackin	2	0	0	0	0	0	2	0	0
15	(United States)	Madison Parsons	1	0	0	0	0	0	1	0	0
13	(United States)	Hannah Richardson	1	0	0	0	0	0	1	0	0
24	(United States)	Courtney Jones	1	0	0	0	0	0	1	0	0
29	(Colombia)	Sintia Cabezas	1	0	0	0	0	0	1	0	0
42	(United States)	Claire Winter	1	0	0	0	0	0	1	0	0
10	(United States)	Libby Moore	1	0	0	0	0	0	1	0	0
4	(United States)	Trinity Watson	1	0	0	0	0	0	1	0	0
11	(United States)	Nicole Vernis	1	0	0	0	0	0	1	0	0
5	(United States)	Madison Perez	1	0	0	0	0	0	1	0	0
Total			27	0	0	0	0	0	27	0	0
