= List of Lexington SC (women) players =

Lexington SC is an American professional women's soccer club which began play in the inaugural season of the USL Super League. All players who have made a competitive appearance for Lexington SC are listed below.

== Key ==
- The list is ordered alphabetically.
- Appearances as a substitute are included.
- Statistics are correct as of June 4, 2026, the end of the 2025–26 USL Super League season, and are updated once a year after the conclusion of the USL Super League season.
- Players whose names are highlighted in **bold** were active players on the Lexington SC roster as of the list's most recent update.

Positions key
GK	Goalkeeper
DF	Defender
MF	Midfielder
FW	Forward

Nationality
Unless otherwise noted, the nationality of a player is determined by the country they most recently represented in international play, or if said player has not played international football then by their country of birth.
Position
Playing positions are listed according to the player's roster designation as of the list's most recent update.
Years
Years are defined as the first and last calendar years in which the player was rostered for the club in any of the competitions listed below.
Appearances and goals
This list counts appearances and goals in the USL Super League and USL Super League playoffs.

== Players ==
Yrs	No.	Pos	Nat	Player	Total		USL Super League		Playoffs	
Yrs	No.	Pos	Nat	Player	Apps	Goals	Apps	Goals	Apps	Goals
2024–2025	23	FW	(United States) USA	Jennifer Aalbue	8	0	8	0	0	0
2024	29	FW	(Canada) CAN	Amanda Allen	9	0	9	0	0	0
2025–2026	26	GK	(United States) USA	Kat Asman	30	0	28	0	2	0
2025–	6	MF	(United States) USA	Taylor Aylmer	30	1	28	1	2	0
2024–2025	30	MF	(United States) USA	Maci Barlow	2	0	2	0	0	0
2025–	15	FW	(United States) USA	Catherine Barry	30	17	28	16	2	1
2025–	12	DF	(United States) USA	Alyssa Bourgeois	30	2	28	2	2	0
2026–	16	DF	(United States) USA	Ally Brown	13	0	11	0	2	0
2025	29	DF	(Colombia) COL	Sintia Cabezas	5	0	5	0	0	0
2024–2026	1	GK	(United States) USA	Sarah Cox	17	0	17	0	0	0
2025	36	FW	(United States) USA	Kate Doyle	13	0	13	0	0	0
2025–2026	10	MF	(Bosnia and Herzegovina) BIH	Emina Ekić	20	2	20	2	0	0
2024	3	MF	(United States) USA	Alyssa Frazier	2	0	2	0	0	0
2025–	17	MF	(United States) USA	Tati Fung	26	0	24	0	2	0
2025	18	MF	(United States) USA	Justina Gaynor	8	0	8	0	0	0
2025–	35	FW	(United States) USA	Sarah Griffith	29	5	27	4	2	1
2024–2026	18, 8	MF	(United States) USA	Natalie Higgins	5	0	5	0	0	0
2024	11	FW	(Norway) NOR	Madelen Holme	1	0	1	0	0	0
2024–2025	33	DF	(United States) USA	Emma Johnson	14	0	14	0	0	0
2025–	19	DF	(United States) USA	Hannah Johnson	26	0	25	0	1	0
2024–2025	24	FW	(United States) USA	Courtney Jones	18	0	18	0	0	0
2024–2025	9	FW	(United States) USA	Elysia Laramie	2	0	2	0	0	0
2025	14	FW	(Colombia) COL	Maithé López	7	1	7	1	0	0
2025	26	DF	(Colombia) COL	Yunaira López	1	0	1	0	0	0
2024–2025	16	FW	(United States) USA	Julie Mackin	24	1	24	1	0	0
2025–	18	MF	(United States) USA	Addie McCain	29	10	27	9	2	1
2024–2025	12	FW	(United States) USA	Marykate McGuire	19	4	19	4	0	0
2024	10	MF	(United States) USA	Kimberly Mendez	8	1	8	1	0	0
2025	10	MF	(United States) USA	Libby Moore	13	0	13	0	0	0
2024–	25	MF	(United States) USA	Shea Moyer	48	5	48	5	0	0
2024–2025	7	DF	(South Korea) KOR	Shin Na-yeong	19	0	19	0	0	0
2025–	9	FW	(United States) USA	Amber Nguyen	9	0	7	0	2	0
2025–	3	DF	(United States) USA	Allison Pantuso	29	2	27	2	2	0
2024–2025	15	FW	(United States) USA	Madison Parsons	28	6	28	6	0	0
2024–	5	DF	(United States) USA	Maddy Perez	31	1	31	1	0	0
2026–	20	MF	(United States) USA	Darya Rajaee	12	1	10	1	2	0
2024–2026	13	FW	(United States) USA	Hannah Richardson	25	3	25	3	0	0
2025–	28	MF	(United States) USA	Cassie Rohan	6	0	6	0	0	0
2025–	21	DF	(United States) USA	Hannah Sharts	23	0	22	0	1	0
2024–2025	22	DF	(United States) USA	Sydney Shepherd (Note: Shepherd scored Lexington's first-ever goal, which came against Carolina Ascent FC on August 25, 2024.)	18	4	18	4	0	0
2024–2025	21	GK	(United States) USA	Bridgette Skiba	10	0	10	0	0	0
2026–	22	DF	(United States) USA	Regan Steigleder	16	1	14	0	2	1
2024–2025	17	FW	(United States) USA	Cori Sullivan	11	0	11	0	0	0
2024–2025	0	GK	(United States) USA	Taiana Tolleson	1	0	1	0	0	0
2024	19	MF	(United States) USA	Natalie Turner-Wyatt	5	0	5	0	0	0
2024	2	FW	(United States) USA	Kailey Utley	14	1	14	1	0	0
2025–	11	MF	(United States) USA	Nicole Vernis	24	2	22	2	2	0
2024–2025	4	DF	(United States) USA	Trinity Watson	9	0	9	0	0	0
2024–2025	20	DF	(United States) USA	Autumn Weeks	16	0	16	0	0	0
2025–	11	FW	(United States) USA	McKenzie Weinert	24	11	22	10	2	1
2025–	2	FW	(United States) USA	Hannah White	39	2	37	2	2	0
2024–2025	42	MF	(United States) USA	Claire Winter	14	0	14	0	0	0
2024–2025	8	MF	(New Zealand) NZL	Grace Wisnewski (Note: Wisnewski was Lexington's first-ever signing, announced on June 17, 2024.)	13	1	13	1	0	0

== By nationality ==
In total, 53 players representing 7 different countries have appeared for Lexington SC.

Note: Countries indicate national team as defined under FIFA eligibility rules. Players may hold more than one non-FIFA nationality.

Country	Total players
Bosnia and Herzegovina	1
Canada	1
Colombia	3
South Korea	1
Norway	1
New Zealand	1
United States	45

== See also ==
- List of top-division football clubs in CONCACAF countries
- List of professional sports teams in the United States and Canada
