= USL Super League Team of the Month =

American women's soccer award

The USL Super League Team of the Month is a monthly women's soccer award given to individual players in the USL Super League (USLS), a top division of women's soccer in the United States. The award began in the USL Super League's inaugural season of play and is published monthly by league staff.

== Winners ==
=== 2024–25 ===
Month	Goalkeeper	Defenders	Midfielders	Forwards	Bench	Ref.
August	(United States) Ashley Orkus, TB	(United States) Vicky Bruce, CAR; (United States) Brooke Hendrix, TB; (England) Abbey-Leigh Stringer, DC; (Tonga) Laveni Vaka, FTL	(Bosnia and Herzegovina) Emina Ekić, SPK; (United States) Cori Sullivan, LEX; (England) Chioma Ubogagu, DAL; (United States) Felicia Knox, FTL	(United States) Mia Corbin, CAR; (United States) Allie Thornton, DAL	N/A	
September	(United States) Meagan McClelland, CAR	(United States) Sydney Studer, CAR; (United States) Talia Staude, TB; (United States) Madison Wolfbauer, DC	(Bosnia and Herzegovina) Emina Ekić, SPK (2); (United States) Amber Brooks, DAL; (England) Chioma Ubogagu, DAL (2); (United States) Mackenzie George, BKN	(United States) Addie McCain, FTL; (United States) Jessica Garziano, BKN; (United States) Jasmine Hamid, FTL	(United States) Izzy Nino, SPK; (United States) Sydny Nasello, TB; (United States) Maddy Perez, LEX; (United States) Mia Corbin, CAR (2); (United States) Allie Thornton, DAL (2)	
October	(United States) Madison White, DAL	(Puerto Rico) Jill Aguilera, CAR; (United States) Hannah Davison, DAL; (Haiti) Claire Constant, DC; (United States) Celia Gaynor, FTL	(United States) Sydny Nasello, TB (2); (United States) Marley Canales, SPK; (United States) Samantha Kroeger, BKN; (United States) Mackenzie Pluck, BKN	(United States) Ashlynn Serepca, CAR; (United States) Madi Parsons, LEX	(Ecuador) Jaydah Bedoya, CAR; (United States) Maddy Perez, LEX (2); (United States) Susanna Friedrichs, DC; (United States) Taylor Aylmer, SPK; (United States) Meagan McClelland, CAR (2)	
November	(United States) Hope Hisey, SPK	(United States) Vicky Bruce, CAR (2); (United States) Madison Wolfbauer, DC (2); (Canada) Vivianne Bessette, TB	(United States) Carlee Giammona, TB; (United States) Samantha Meza, DAL; (Canada) Amanda Allen, LEX; (United States) Felicia Knox, FTL (2)	(United States) Gracie Brian, DAL; (Brazil) Luana Grabias, BKN; (England) Natasha Flint, TB	(United States) Madi Parsons, LEX (2); (Ecuador) Jaydah Bedoya, CAR (2); (United States) Madison White, DAL (2); (United States) Sarah Clark, SPK	
December	(United States) Neeku Purcell, BKN	(Canada) Sabrina McNeill, FTL; (United States) Allison Pantuso, BKN; (United States) Jenna Walker, DAL; (Canada) Julianne Vallerand, SPK	(United States) Samantha Kroeger, BKN (2); (United States) Shea Moyer, LEX; (United States) Addie McCain, FTL (2)	(England) Natasha Flint, TB (2); (United States) Allie Thornton, DAL (3); (United States) Jasmine Hamid, FTL (2)	(United States) Susanna Friedrichs, DC (2); (United States) Julie Mackin, LEX; (Canada) Jordyn Listro, TB; (United States) Sydney Studer, CAR (2); (United States) Bridgette Skiba, LEX	
February	(United States) Hope Hisey, SPK (2)	(United States) Jenna Butler, CAR; (United States) Laurel Ansbrow, FTL; (United States) Sarah Clark, SPK (2)	(United States) Samantha Kroeger, BKN (3); (United States) Amber Brooks, DAL (2); (United States) Emily Colton, DC; (United States) Addie McCain, FTL (3)	(United States) Mia Corbin, CAR (3); (United States) Carlee Giammona, TB (2); (United States) Jasmine Hamid, FTL (3)	(United States) Kelsey Hill, BKN; (United States) Brooke Hendrix, TB (2); (United States) Nicole Vernis, LEX; (United States) Sydny Nasello, TB (3); (United States) Lexi Missimo, DAL	
March	(United States) Cosette Morché, FTL	(United States) Hannah Davison, DAL (2); (United States) Laurel Ansbrow, FTL (2); (United States) Haley Thomas, SPK	(United States) Taylor Aylmer, SPK (2); (United States) Shea Moyer, LEX (2); (United States) Audrey Harding, CAR; (United States) Mackenzie George, BKN (2)	(United States) Mia Corbin, CAR (4); (England) Natasha Flint, TB (3); (United States) Gianna Gourley, DC	(Canada) Vivianne Bessette, TB (2); (United States) Camryn Lancaster, DAL; (United States) Sh'Nia Gordon, FTL; (Puerto Rico) Jill Aguilera, CAR (2)	
April	(United States) Samantha Leshnak Murphy, CAR	(Guyana) Sydney Cummings, SPK; (United States) Susanna Fitch, DC; (United States) Sydney Studer, CAR (3); (United States) Brooke Hendrix, TB (3)	(United States) Addie McCain, FTL (4); (United States) Sydny Nasello, TB (4); (United States) Amber Brooks, DAL (3)	(United States) Mia Corbin, CAR (5); (Brazil) Tamara Bolt, DAL; (United States) McKenzie Weinert, SPK	(United States) Allie Thornton, DAL (4); (United States) Shea Moyer, LEX (3); (Bosnia and Herzegovina) Emina Ekić, SPK; (United States) Ashley Orkus, TB (2)	
May	(Jamaica) Sydney Schneider, TB	(Canada) Sabrina McNeill, FTL (2); (United States) Jenna Butler, CAR (2); (United States) Sarah Clark, SPK (3)	(United States) Hope Breslin, BKN; (United States) Katie Duong, DC; (Bosnia and Herzegovina) Emina Ekić, SPK (4); (United States) Sh'Nia Gordon, FTL	(Denmark) Cecilie Fløe, TB; (Ethiopia) Loza Abera, DC; (United States) Allie Thornton, DAL (5)	(United States) Brooke Hendrix, TB (4); (England) Chioma Ubogagu, DAL (3); (United States) Kiara Locklear, FTL; (United States) Ally Cook, SPK	

=== 2025–26 ===
Month	Goalkeeper	Defenders	Midfielders	Forwards	Bench	Ref.
September	(United States) Hope Hisey, SPK	(United States) Kelsey Hill, BKN; (United States) Ella Simpson, FTL; (United States) Sarah McCoy, SPK	(United States) Amber Wisner, DAL; (United States) Addie McCain, LEX; (United States) Alexis Theoret, DC; (United States) Kelli Van Treeck, FTL	(United States) Catherine Barry, LEX; (United States) Ashlyn Puerta, JAX; (United States) Kiara Locklear, FTL	(Guyana) Sydney Cummings, DC; (United States) Julia Lester, JAX; (United States) Sydny Nasello, TB; (United States) Gianna Gourley, DC; (United States) Maddie Mercado, CAR; (United States) Sealey Strawn, DAL	
October	(United States) Hope Hisey, SPK (2)	(Puerto Rico) Jill Aguilera, CAR; (United States) Sydney Studer, CAR; (United States) Hannah Sharts, LEX; (United States) Reese Tappan, SPK	(United States) Alexis Theoret, DC (2); (United States) Sydny Nasello, TB (2); (United States) Ashlyn Puerta, JAX (2)	(United States) Audrey Harding, CAR; (United States) Sarah Griffith, LEX; (Republic of Ireland) Rebecca Cooke, BKN	(United States) Leah Scarpelli, BKN; (Scotland) Georgia Brown, JAX; (United States) Addie McCain, LEX (2); (United States) Jasmine Hamid, FTL; (United States) Ally Cook, SPK; (United States) Paige Kenton, JAX; (United States) Kat Asman, LEX	
November	(United States) Kaitlyn Parks, JAX	(Canada) Sabrina McNeill, TB; (Scotland) Georgia Brown, JAX (2); (United States) Jenna Butler, CAR; (United States) Susanna Fitch, DC	(United States) Samantha Kroeger, BKN; (United States) Lily Nabet, FTL; (United States) Taylor Aylmer, LEX	(United States) Rhea Moore, DAL; (United States) McKenzie Weinert, LEX; (United States) Paige Kenton, JAX (2)	(Australia) Madison McComasky, FTL; (Canada) Vivianne Bessette, TB; (United States) Emma Jaskaniec, SPK; (Republic of Ireland) Rebecca Cooke, BKN (2); (United States) Rylee Baisden, CAR; (United States) Gianna Gourley, DC (2); (Jamaica) Sydney Schneider, TB	
December	(United States) Rylee Foster, DAL	(United States) Sydney Studer, CAR (2); (United States) Allison Pantuso, LEX; (Scotland) Georgia Brown, JAX (3)	(England) Chioma Ubogagu, DAL; (United States) Emily Colton, DC; (United States) Emma Jaskaniec, SPK; (United States) Sophia Boman, JAX	(United States) Gianna Gourley, DC (3); (United States) Lena Silano, SPK; (United States) Paige Kenton, JAX (3)	(United States) Kelli Van Treeck, FTL (2); (Ghana) Jennifer Cudjoe, BKN; (United States) Taylor Aylmer, LEX (2); (Switzerland) Sandrine Gaillard, TB; (United States) Catherine Zimmerman, BKN; (United States) Allie Thornton, DAL; (United States) Meagan McClelland, CAR	
February	(United States) Kaitlyn Parks, JAX (2)	(United States) Allison Pantuso, LEX; (Scotland) Georgia Brown, JAX (4); (United States) Sydney Studer, CAR (3); (United States) Amber Wisner, DAL (2)	(Argentina) Sophia Braun, SPK; (Canada) Wayny Balata, DAL; (United States) Ashlyn Puerta, JAX (3)	(United States) Sydny Nasello, TB (3); (United States) Lena Silano, SPK (2); (United States) Catherine Barry, LEX (2)	(Australia) Morgan Aquino, DC; (United States) McKenzie Weinert, LEX (2); (United States) Jasmine Hamid, FTL (2); (United States) Baylee DeSmit, JAX; (United States) Emily Colton, DC (2); (United States) Samantha Kroeger, BKN (2); (Canada) Sabrina McNeill, TB (2)	
March	(Puerto Rico) Sydney Martinez, CAR	(United States) Taylor Chism, TB; (United States) Maggie Illig, JAX; (United States) Ginger Fontenot, SPK; (United States) Regan Steigleder, LEX	(United States) Heather Stainbrook, DAL; (United States) Sophia Boman, JAX (2); (United States) Darya Rajaee, LEX	(United States) Tyler Lussi, CAR; (Ethiopia) Loza Abera, DC; (United States) Faith Webber, TB	(United States) Kaitlyn Parks, JAX (3); (United States) Tori Zierenberg, SPK; (United States) Catherine Barry, LEX (3); (United States) Mia Corbin, CAR; (United States) Amber Wisner, DAL (3); (United States) Emily Colton, DC (3); (United States) Jenna Butler, CAR (2)	
April	(Puerto Rico) Sydney Martinez, CAR (2)	(Puerto Rico) Jill Aguilera, CAR (2); (United States) Amber Wisner, DAL (4); (United States) Alyssa Bourgeois, LEX; (United States) Grace Phillpotts, JAX	(United States) Sophia Boman, JAX (3); (United States) Emma Jaskaniec, SPK (3); (United States) Samantha Kroeger, BKN (3)	(United States) Emily Colton, DC (4); (United States) Catherine Barry, LEX (4); (Ethiopia) Loza Abera, DC (2)	(United States) Kat Asman, LEX (2); (United States) Jenna Butler, CAR (2); (United States) Justina Gaynor, DC; (United States) McKenzie Weinert, LEX (3); (United States) Baylee DeSmit, JAX (2); (United States) Tori Zierenberg, SPK (2); (United States) Kiara Locklear, FTL (2)	

=== 2026 ===
Month	Goalkeeper	Defenders	Midfielders	Forwards	Bench	Ref.
August	(Germany) Jamie Gerstenberg, JAX	(United States) Gracie Falla, LEX; (United States) Reese Tappan, CAR; (United States) Addisyn Merrick, CAR; (United States) Justina Gaynor, DC	(United States) Sydny Nasello, TB; (United States) Sophia Boman, JAX; (United States) Kelsey Oyler, FTL	(United States) Baylee DeSmit, JAX; (Ethiopia) Loza Abera, DC; (United States) Shea Connors, TB	(Puerto Rico) Sydney Martinez, CAR; (United States) Hannah White, LEX; (Panama) Sofia Cedeño, DAL; (United States) Emma Jaskaniec, DC; (United States) Ashlyn Puerta, JAX; (United States) Taylor Chism, TB; (United States) Alyssa Bourgeois, LEX	
September	(Puerto Rico) Sydney Martinez, CAR (2)	(United States) Allison Pantuso, LEX; (Argentina) Sophia Braun, DAL; (Haiti) Claire Constant, DC; (Puerto Rico) Jill Aguilera, CAR	(United States) Shea Groom, CAR; (United States) Mia Corbin, CAR	(United States) Jasmine Hamid, DAL; (United States) Baylee DeSmit, JAX (2); (United States) Onyeka Gamero, DAL; (United States) Shea Connors, TB	(United States) Ryan Campbell, LEX; (United States) Ally Brown, LEX; (United States) Regan Steigleder, LEX; (United States) Carissa Boeckmann, DAL; (United States) Abby Boyan, DC; (Canada) Jordyn Listro, TB; (United States) Catherine Zimmerman, BKN	
October	(Puerto Rico) Sydney Martinez, CAR (3)	(United States) Lauren Gogal, BKN; (United States) Jenna Butler, CAR; (United States) Reese Tappan, CAR (2); (Argentina) Sophia Braun, DAL	(United States) Jilly Shimkin, BKN; (United States) Ashlyn Puerta, JAX (2); (United States) Addie McCain, LEX	(United States) Sh'Nia Gordon, FTL; (United States) Catherine Barry, LEX; (United States) Catherine Zimmerman, BKN (2)	(United States) Katie Cappelletti, DC; (Puerto Rico) Jill Aguilera, CAR (2); (United States) Emily Colton, DC; (United States) Jessica Garziano, BKN; (United States) Baylee DeSmit, JAX (3); (United States) Paige Kenton, JAX; (United States) Rylee Baisden, CAR	

== Multiple winners ==
**Bold**	Indicates current USL Super League player

Rank	N.	Player	Club(s)	Wins
1	(United States)	**Sydny Nasello**	**Tampa Bay Sun FC**	8
2	(United States)	**Mia Corbin**	**Carolina Ascent FC**	7
2	(United States)	**Addie McCain**	**Fort Lauderdale United FC**, **Lexington SC**	7
2	(United States)	Amber Wisner (née Brooks)	Dallas Trinity FC	7
5	(Puerto Rico)	**Jill Aguilera**	**Carolina Ascent FC**	6
5	(United States)	**Jenna Butler**	**Carolina Ascent FC**	6
5	(United States)	**Emily Colton**	**DC Power FC**	6
5	(United States)	**Jasmine Hamid**	**Fort Lauderdale United FC**	6
5	(United States)	**Samantha Kroeger**	**Brooklyn FC**	6
5	(United States)	**Sydney Studer**	**Carolina Ascent FC**	6
5	(United States)	Allie Thornton	Dallas Trinity FC	6
12	(United States)	**Catherine Barry**	**Lexington SC**	5
12	(United States)	**Baylee DeSmit**	**Sporting Club Jacksonville**	5
12	(Puerto Rico)	**Sydney Martinez**	**Carolina Ascent FC**	5
12	(United States)	**Ashlyn Puerta**	**Sporting Club Jacksonville**	5
16	(Ethiopia)	**Loza Abera**	**DC Power FC**	4
16	(United States)	**Taylor Aylmer**	**Spokane Zephyr FC**, **Lexington SC**	4
16	(United States)	**Sophia Boman**	**Sporting Club Jacksonville**	4
16	(Scotland)	**Georgia Brown**	**Sporting Club Jacksonville**	4
16	(Bosnia and Herzegovina)	Emina Ekić	Spokane Zephyr FC	4
16	(United States)	**Gianna Gourley**	**DC Power FC**	4
16	(United States)	**Brooke Hendrix**	**Tampa Bay Sun FC**	4
16	(United States)	**Hope Hisey**	**Spokane Zephyr FC**	4
16	(United States)	**Emma Jaskaniec**	**Spokane Zephyr FC**	4
16	(United States)	**Paige Kenton**	**Sporting Club Jacksonville**	4
16	(United States)	**Sarah McCoy (née Clark)**	**Spokane Zephyr FC**	4
16	(Canada)	**Sabrina McNeill**	**Fort Lauderdale United FC**, **Tampa Bay Sun FC**	4
16	(United States)	**Allison Pantuso**	**Brooklyn FC**, **Lexington SC**	4
16	(England)	**Chioma Ubogagu**	**Dallas Trinity FC**	4
16	(United States)	**McKenzie Weinert**	**Spokane Zephyr FC**, **Lexington SC**	4
31	(Canada)	**Vivianne Bessette**	**Tampa Bay Sun FC**	3
31	(Argentina)	**Sophia Braun**	**Lexington SC**, **Dallas Trinity FC**	3
31	(United States)	**Susanna Fitch (née Friedrichs)**	**DC Power FC**	3
31	(England)	Natasha Flint	Tampa Bay Sun FC	3
31	(United States)	**Sh'Nia Gordon**	**Fort Lauderdale United FC**	3
31	(United States)	**Kiara Locklear**	**Fort Lauderdale United FC**	3
31	(United States)	Meagan McClelland	Carolina Ascent FC	3
31	(United States)	**Shea Moyer**	**Lexington SC**	3
31	(United States)	**Kaitlyn Parks**	**Sporting Club Jacksonville**	3
31	(United States)	**Reese Tappan**	**Spokane Zephyr FC**, **DC Power FC**	3
31	(United States)	**Catherine Zimmerman**	**Brooklyn FC**	3
42	(United States)	Laurel Ansbrow	Fort Lauderdale United FC	2
42	(United States)	Kat Asman	Lexington SC	2
42	(United States)	**Rylee Baisden**	**Carolina Ascent FC**	2
42	(Ecuador)	Jaydah Bedoya	Carolina Ascent FC	2
42	(United States)	**Alyssa Bourgeois**	**Lexington SC**	2
42	(United States)	Vicky Bruce	Carolina Ascent FC	2
42	(United States)	**Taylor Chism**	**Dallas Trinity FC**	2
42	(United States)	**Audrey Coleman (née Harding)**	**Carolina Ascent FC**	2
42	(United States)	**Shea Connors**	**Tampa Bay Sun FC**	2
42	(Haiti)	**Claire Constant**	**DC Power FC**	2
42	(United States)	**Ally Cook**	**Spokane Zephyr FC**	2
42	(Republic of Ireland)	**Rebecca Cooke**	**Brooklyn FC**	2
42	(Guyana)	**Sydney Cummings**	**Spokane Zephyr FC**, **DC Power FC**	2
42	(United States)	Hannah Davison	Dallas Trinity FC	2
42	(United States)	**Jessica Garziano**	**Brooklyn FC**	2
42	(United States)	**Justina Gaynor**	**DC Power FC**	2
42	(United States)	**Mackenzie George**	**Brooklyn FC**	2
42	(United States)	**Carlee Giammona**	**Tampa Bay Sun FC**	2
42	(United States)	**Kelsey Hill**	**Brooklyn FC**	2
42	(United States)	**Felicia Knox**	**Fort Lauderdale United FC**	2
42	(Canada)	**Jordyn Listro**	**Tampa Bay Sun FC**	2
42	(United States)	Ashley Orkus	Tampa Bay Sun FC	2
42	(United States)	Madi Parsons	Lexington SC	2
42	(United States)	Maddy Perez	Lexington SC	2
42	(Jamaica)	Sydney Schneider	Tampa Bay Sun FC	2
42	(United States)	Lena Silano	Spokane Zephyr FC	2
42	(United States)	**Regan Steigleder**	**Lexington SC**	2
42	(United States)	**Alexis Theoret**	**DC Power FC**	2
42	(United States)	**Kelli Van Treeck**	**Fort Lauderdale United FC**	2
42	(United States)	Madison White	Carolina Ascent FC	2
42	(United States)	Madison Wolfbauer	DC Power FC	2
42	(United States)	**Tori Zierenberg**	**Spokane Zephyr FC**	2

== See also ==
- List of sports awards honoring women
- USL Super League awards
- USL Super League Player of the Month
- NWSL Player of the Month
- Women's soccer in the United States
