= Yunaira López =

Colombian footballer (born 2004)

Personal information
- Full name: Yunaira Jessely López Moreno
- Date of birth: 4 December 2004 (age 21)
- Place of birth: Carepa, Colombia
- Height: 1.69 m (5 ft 7 in)
- Position: Defender

Team information
- Current team: FC Juárez
- Number: 5

Senior career*
Years	Team	Apps	(Gls)
- Independiente Medellín
2023–2024	Atlético Nacional		
2025	Lexington SC	1	(0)
2025–	FC Juárez	29	(1)

International career^{‡}
2022–2024	Colombia U20	7+	(1+)
2025–	Colombia	1	(0)
- * Club domestic league appearances and goals as of 19:15, 18 October 2026 (UTC) ‡ National team caps and goals as of 8 July 2025

Yunaira Jessely López Moreno (born 4 December 2004) is a Colombian professional footballer who plays as a defender for Liga MX Femenil club FC Juárez and the Colombia national team. She has previously played for Colombian Women's Football League clubs Independiente Medellín and Atlético Nacional, and USL Super League club Lexington SC.

== Club career ==
López started her career with Independiente Medellín before joining Atlético Nacional. She was part of the squad that competed in the 2023 Copa Liberatores before being eliminated in the semifinals. In 2024, López showed stability, winning 83.5% of her aerial duels and 81.2% of her defensive duels. She also scored a goal for Atlético Nacional in July 2024 to help the team climb to the top of the Colombian Women's Football League standings.

On 22 January 2025, López signed with American club Lexington SC midway through the inaugural USL Super League season. She made her USLS debut in a defeat to Spokane Zephyr FC on 16 April. It would prove to be her only appearance with Lexington before she parted ways with the club in May 2025.

López signed with Liga MX Femenil team FC Juárez on 6 June 2025, bolstering the squad ahead of the 2025–26 Liga MX Femenil campaign. In January 2026, she scored her first Liga MX goal in a defeat to Toluca. She made 26 appearances in her first season with the club, helping Las Bravas to the first round of the Liguilla playoffs. In the second match of Juárez's two-legged quarterfinal against Club América, López was sent off in the 40th minute after committing a second bookable offense; the match ended as a 3–2 loss for Juárez, eliminating them from the competition.

== International career ==
=== Youth ===
López was included in Colombia's squad for the 2022 FIFA U-20 Women's World Cup. She was a consistent starter as Colombia were eliminated in the quarterfinals.

Two years later, López also played in the 2024 FIFA U-20 Women's World Cup, which was hosted by Colombia. During the team's opening match, against Australia, she scored Colombia's first tournament goal by capitalizing on a scramble in the box following a corner kick; Linda Caicedo also scored as Colombia secured a 2–0 victory to start off their campaign. In the team's final group stage match, versus Mexico, López attempted to head an aerial ball when she collided with teammate Luisa Agudelo. She sustained a blow to the head and was left laying prone on the field following the incident. López was subsequently fitted with a neck brace, stretchered off of the pitch, and transported to the Pablo Tobón Uribe Hospital via ambulance. Medical staff later reported that while López had suffered mild head trauma, she was stable and had not developed any neurological disorders. She was able to recover from the injury and made her return to the field in Colombia's quarterfinal match against the Netherlands, coming on as a substitute for Sintia Cabezas in extra time; the Netherlands ultimately vanquished Colombia on penalties, ending the host nation's tournament run.

=== Senior ===
López received her first call-up to the Colombian senior team in March 2025, ahead of a friendly match against Japan on 7 April. She was awarded her first international cap and start as Colombia lost the game, 6–1.

== Career statistics ==
=== International ===
As of 8 July 2025

Appearances and goals by national team and year
National team	Year	Apps	Goals
Colombia	2025	1	0
Total		1	0
