= Cori Sullivan =

American soccer player (born 1999)

Personal information
- Full name: Cori Michelle Sullivan
- Date of birth: October 17, 1999 (age 27)
- Height: 5 ft 6 in (1.68 m)
- Position: Forward

Youth career
- Scottsdale Blackhawks
- SC Del Sol

College career
Years	Team	Apps	(Gls)
2018–2021	Arizona State Sun Devils	49	(6)
2022	Washington Huskies	16	(1)

Senior career*
Years	Team	Apps	(Gls)
2023	Cruz Azul	13	(1)
2023	Glasgow City	19	(5)
2024–2025	Lexington SC	11	(0)
- * Club domestic league appearances and goals as of June 27, 2025

Cori Michelle Sullivan (born January 1, 2001) is an American former professional soccer player who played as a forward. She played college soccer for the Arizona State Sun Devils and the Washington Huskies before playing professionally for Cruz Azul of the Liga MX Femenil, Glasgow City of the Scottish Women's Premier League, and Lexington SC of the USL Super League.

== Early life ==
Born into a family with four other sisters, Sullivan grew up in Prescott, Arizona, and attended BASIS Prescott High School. She initially played club soccer with the Scottsdale Blackhawks before joining SC Del Sol. With SC Del Sol, Sullivan won an AYSA State Cup Championship. She was also a member of the Arizona Olympic Development Program team, where she was named to the Championship All-Tournament and All-Region teams while with the ODP.

== College career ==
=== Arizona State Sun Devils ===
Despite having previously committed to the Pittsburgh Panthers, Sullivan changed plans and began playing with the Arizona State Sun Devils in 2018. She scored her first Sun Devil goal in her collegiate debut, a 3–1 victory over the Montana Grizzlies. She went on to score 1 more goal and record 2 assists over 18 total freshman appearances.

Throughout her freshman season, Sullivan had been suffering through Celiac Disease and consequently faced challenges while playing. After being diagnosed with Hashimoto's disease in mid-2019, she elected to take a season away from soccer to focus on her health. Sullivan prepared to return to active play in 2020, but the COVID-19 pandemic and ACL injury delayed her return for another year. In her first start back from recovery, she scored a double overtime game-winner against UCLA to mark Arizona State's first win over the Bruins in 20 years. Sullivan was subsequently named the Pac-12 Offensive Player of the Week for her efforts.

=== Washington Huskies ===
After spending four years in Arizona, Sullivan transferred to the University of Washington. In her debut with the Huskies, she tallied an assist to help Washington beat Fresno State, 3–0. Sullivan's one and only goal as a Husky came on October 2, 2022, the final goal in a 4–1 victory over Colorado. She ended up making 16 total appearances (1 start) in her single season with Washington.

== Club career ==
=== Cruz Azul ===
Due to a torn meniscus that required surgery, Sullivan was not able to declare for the 2023 NWSL Draft. Instead, she signed a contract with Mexican club Cruz Azul in February 2023, reuniting with former Arizona State teammate Alexia Delgado. She scored five minutes into her Liga MX Femenil debut, a Clausura match against the Pumas that ended with a 1–1 draw. Sullivan's strike would mark the third time in a row that she registered a direct goal contribution in her debut with a new team.

=== Glasgow City ===
Sullivan signed a two-year contract with Scottish Women's Premier League club Glasgow City on July 17, 2023. She played in 19 matches with the club, as well as several of Glasgow City's UEFA Women's Champions League qualification games. She scored 11 goals in the SWPL Sky Cup, becoming the tournament's top scorer, and 5 in regular season play. 4 of her 11 cup goals came in an 11–1 drubbing of St Johnstone, which earned her a spot on the SWPL team of the week. At the end of the season, Sullivan was among the list of players not returning to Glasgow City.

=== Lexington SC ===
On July 5, 2024, Sullivan signed a contract with Lexington SC ahead of the USL Super League's inaugural season of action. She started and played 85 minutes in Lexington's inaugural match, a 1–1 draw with Carolina Ascent FC. On September 5, she was named to the Super League's first-ever team of the month after her positive two-way performance against the Ascent. Sullivan totaled 11 appearances (3 starts) with Lexington before departing from the club at the end of the season.

On January 19, 2026, Sullivan announced her retirement from professional soccer via social media.
