= Sydney Shepherd =

English cricketer

Sydney George Shepherd (23 August 1908 – 20 December 1987) was an English first-class cricketer. He was a right-handed batsman and right arm medium-fast bowler who made a single appearance for Worcestershire against Yorkshire in May 1936. Batting at nine, he scored 9 and 0, on the latter occasion being dismissed by Hedley Verity who was on his way to taking 8-40.

After World War II, Shepherd played for some years in minor counties cricket for Cheshire. His first appearance at that level was something of a mixed experience, as he took 4–71 in the first innings, but Cheshire lost by ten wickets to the Lancashire Second XI, never recovering from collapsing in their first innings from 85/2 to 120 all out with the last six Cheshire batsmen all making ducks.

Shepherd's final appearance in the Minor Counties Championship was in June 1959 against the Yorkshire seconds, when he was nearly 52 years of age, and his second-innings 3-83 included the distinguished scalps of Brian Bolus, Jack Birkenshaw and Barry Stead.

He was born in York, and died at the age of 79 in Graigadwywynt, Ruthin, Denbighshire, Wales.
