= Libby Moore =

American soccer player (born 2001)

Personal information
- Full name: Elizabeth Cunningham Moore
- Date of birth: January 19, 2001 (age 25)
- Place of birth: Wilmington, North Carolina, U.S.
- Height: 5 ft 3 in (1.60 m)
- Position: Midfielder

Team information
- Current team: Þór/KA
- Number: 10

Youth career
- 2014–2019: Wilmington Hammerheads

College career
Years	Team	Apps	(Gls)
2019–2022	North Carolina Tar Heels	64	(2)

Senior career*
Years	Team	Apps	(Gls)
2023	Fortuna Hjørring	6	(1)
2023	Shelbourne	4	(0)
2024	NJ/NY Gotham FC	0	(0)
2025	Lexington SC	13	(0)
2025–2026	Turbine Potsdam	12	(0)
2026–	Þór/KA	0	(0)
- * Club domestic league appearances and goals as of 15:15, July 16, 2026 (UTC)

Elizabeth Cunningham Moore (born January 19, 2001) is an American professional soccer player who plays as a midfielder for Icelandic championship club Þór/KA. She played college soccer for the North Carolina Tar Heels. She has previously been a member of Danish club Fortuna Hjørring, Irish club Shelbourne, National Women's Soccer League (NWSL) club NJ/NY Gotham FC, USL Super League club Lexington SC, and German club Turbine Potsdam.

== Early life ==
Moore was born and raised in Wilmington, North Carolina. She started playing club soccer for the Wilmington Hammerheads in 2014, eventually becoming a four-year team captain and helping the Hammerheads reach two state finals. In 2019, her final year with the team, she was named the club's youth Player of the Year.

At PK3–12 private school Cape Fear Academy, Moore was a multi-sport athlete. Starting in middle school, she participated in varsity soccer, swim, and field hockey. With the soccer team, she was a three-year captain, two-time all-state honoree, and three-time all-area honoree. As a seventh grader in 2013, she was a member of the Cape Fear team that won a North Carolina state championship. Moore departed from high school having set a program record for career goals scored. Off the soccer pitch, she had also won one MVP award in field hockey and made three state cuts for the swim team.

== College career ==
As a high school sophomore, Moore began receiving interest from multiple NCAA Division I programs. After graduating from Cape Fear Academy in 2019, she joined the North Carolina Tar Heels for four seasons of college soccer. She made one appearance as a freshman, making a 15-minute cameo in a match against UNLV. The following season, she grew significantly in playing time, appearing in all 20 of the Tar Heels' matches and starting all 8 in the second half of the season. She started in every match of the 2020 NCAA tournament, including the title match, in which UNC were beaten by Santa Clara. In October 2020, she scored her first collegiate goal to cap off a 2–0 win over Syracuse.

Moore started her junior season with 9 consecutive starts before coming on as a substitute in the final 8 games of 2021. As a senior in 2022, she helped North Carolina win the ACC tournament and reach the NCAA tournament championship match for the second time in three years. She started in half of the Tar Heels' 26 games that season. Moore departed from Chapel Hill having registered 64 total appearances and 2 goals.

== Club career ==
Moore entered her name into the 2023 NWSL Draft, but was not selected by any team. Instead, in February 2023, she signed her first professional contract with Danish club Fortuna Hjørring alongside former Tar Heel teammate Aleigh Gambone. In doing so, she joined a strong contingent of eight American players at Hjørring.

On August 14, 2023, Moore was announced to have signed for League of Ireland Women's Premier Division club Shelbourne through the remainder of the 2023 season. She scored her first goal for Shelbourne on September 9, 2023, finishing from close range in a UEFA Women's Champions League qualification match against Welsh team Cardiff City.

Moore returned stateside in October 2024, as one of seven players to sign a national team replacement deal with NJ/NY Gotham FC of the National Women's Soccer League ahead of the 2024 NWSL x Liga MX Femenil Summer Cup final. She was an unused substitute as Gotham were defeated by the Kansas City Current, 2–0.

On February 11, 2025, Lexington SC announced that they had signed Moore ahead of the second half of the inaugural USL Super League season. Moore made her Super League debut five days later, starting and playing the entirety of a 2–1 loss to the Carolina Ascent. She went on to make 13 appearances for Lexington as the club finished the campaign in last place. In June 2025, she was among the list of players departing at the end of the season.

German second-division club 1. FFC Turbine Potsdam announced the signing of Moore on September 11, 2025, as the team kicked off its first season in the 2. Frauen-Bundesliga since having been relegated from the top-flight. Moore competed in 12 league matches in her first season with the club.

In July 2026, she moved to Iceland and joined top-flight Besta deild kvenna team Þór/KA on a one-year deal.

== Honors ==
North Carolina Tar Heels

- Atlantic Coast Conference: 2019, 2022
- ACC tournament: 2019
- NCAA tournament runner-up: 2019, 2022
