= Sarah McCoy =

American novelist

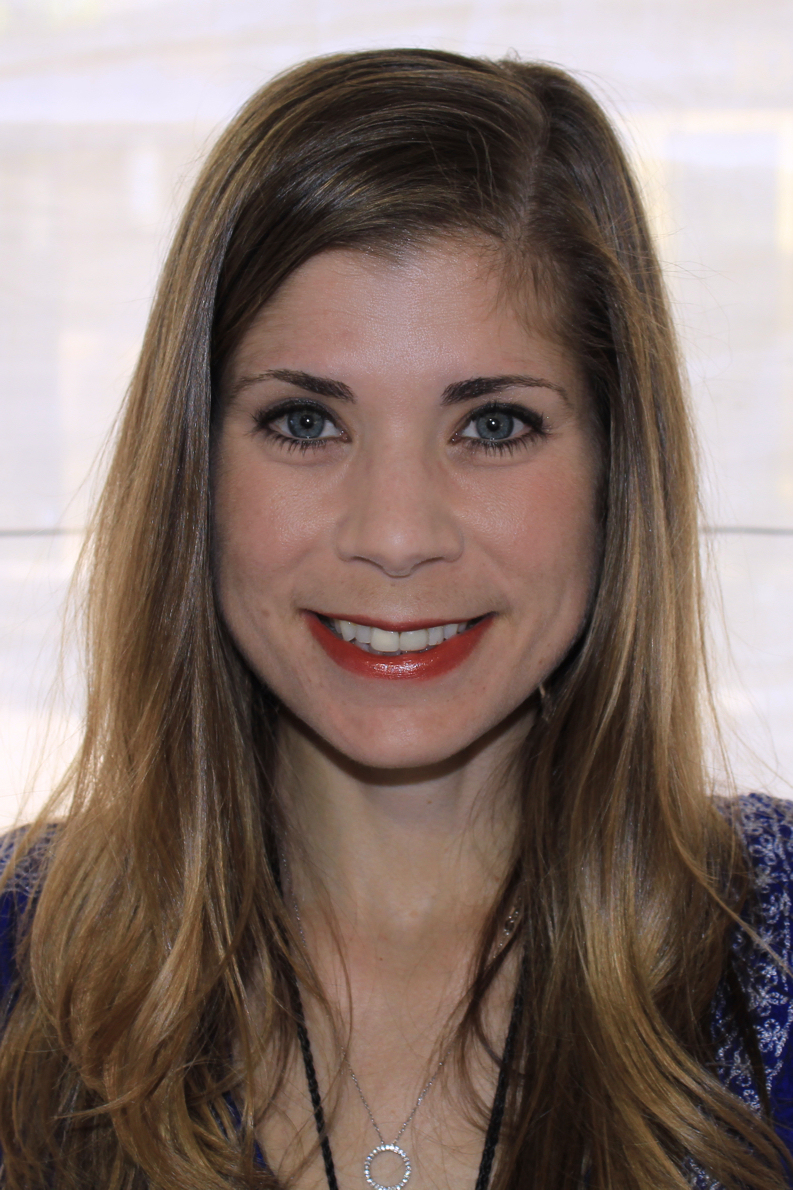
- McCoy at the 2015 Texas Book Festival.
- Born: 1980 (age 45–46); Fort Knox, Kentucky, U.S.
- Education: Virginia Tech (BA); Old Dominion University (MFA)
- Occupation: Author
- Website: sarahmccoy.com

Sarah McCoy (born 1980) is a New York Times, USA Today, and international bestselling American novelist.

== Early life and education ==
The daughter of a career Army officer from Oklahoma and a Puerto Rican schoolteacher, McCoy was born in Fort Knox, Kentucky, but grew up on or near military installations, including Stuttgart, Germany; Aberdeen, Maryland; Ft. Leavenworth, Kansas, and various locations in Virginia. She attended Virginia Tech where she received her BA in Journalism and Public Relations. She earned her MFA in English Creative Writing from Old Dominion University in Norfolk, Virginia.

== Writing ==
McCoy's master's degree thesis was her debut novel The Time It Snowed in Puerto Rico (Random House, 2009). Her second novel The Baker's Daughter (Crown, 2012) was a New York Times bestseller, a USA Today bestseller and an international bestseller. Her novella The Branch of Hazel is included in the WWII anthology Grand Central: Original Stories of Postwar Love and Reunion (Penguin, 2014). Her novel The Mapmaker's Children was released by Crown on May 5, 2015. Marilla of Green Gables released from William Morrow/HarperCollins in 2018 and was a book club pick for USA Today, New York Post, Woman's World, BookBub, PopSugar, Library Journal, and Indie Next List, among other accolades. Mustique Island released from William Morrow/HarperCollins in 2022 and was a Best Book of the Month Pick by Amazon, PopSugar, Town & Country, Vox, Veranda, and others. The Washington Post praised, "McCoy's gorgeous novel takes place on the Caribbean island of Mustique in the 1970s, a getaway for Princess Margaret…”

In 2025, Sarah McCoy published the novel Whatever Happened to Lori Lovely? loosely inspired by her correspondence with the former actress turned Benedictine nun Dolores Hart. The novel was a Book Club Pick by BookBub, Woman's World, Brenda Novak's Book Group, and received critical praise. Called a "lush, compelling story" by Shelf Awareness and recommended for "those who like their historical fiction gritty and realistic, but with a tender, heartrending throughline" by Bookreporter.

McCoy's writing has appeared in Newsweek, Real Simple, Lit Hub, The Millions, Your Health Monthly, Writer Unboxed, the Huffington Post and other publications. She hosted the NPR WSNC Radio monthly program Bookmarked with Sarah McCoy and previously taught English writing at Old Dominion University and at the University of Texas at El Paso.

== Personal ==
McCoy and her husband, an orthopedic sports surgeon at Wake Forest University, live in Winston-Salem, North Carolina.

== Novels ==
- The Time It Snowed in Puerto Rico, Random House, 2009
- The Baker's Daughter, Crown, 2012
- The Branch of Hazel (a novella) in the anthology Grand Central, Penguin, 2014
- The Mapmaker's Children, Crown, 2015.
- Proof of Providence, published only in French (Le souffle des feuilles et des promesses), Michel Lafon, 2017.
- Marilla of Green Gables, HarperCollins, 2018.
- Mustique Island, HarperCollins, 2022.
- Whatever Happened to Lori Lovely?, William Morrow/HarperCollins, 2025.
