= Bridgette Skiba =

American soccer player (born 1999)

Personal information
- Full name: Bridgette Nicole Skiba
- Date of birth: October 20, 1999 (age 27)
- Height: 5 ft 9 in (1.75 m)
- Position: Goalkeeper

Youth career
- Westside Timbers FC

College career
Years	Team	Apps	(Gls)
2018–2021	Oregon State Beavers	67	(0)

Senior career*
Years	Team	Apps	(Gls)
2023	Chicago Red Stars	0	(0)
2023–2024	HB Køge	14	(0)
2024–2025	Lexington SC	10	(0)
2025–	Stjarnan	10	(0)
- * Club domestic league appearances and goals

Bridgette Nicole Skiba (born October 20, 1999, Portland, Oregon) is an American professional soccer player who plays as a goalkeeper for Besta deild kvenna club Stjarnan.

== Early life and youth career ==
Skiba grew up in Portland, Oregon, and attended Sunset High School in Beaverton, where she played for the Apollos and the Westside Timbers club team.

She was a three-time All-State selection, including First-Team selections in 2016 and 2017 and a Second-Team in 2015, and earned All-Metro honors from 2015 to 2017. In the 2016 OSAA Class 6A semifinals, Skiba saved three penalty kicks and scored the decisive one against defending state champion Jesuit High School to send Sunset to the state final. The Oregonian described her as “the best goalie in the state.”

She graduated as her class salutatorian.

== College ==
Skiba joined the Oregon State Beavers in 2018 as part of the program's incoming recruiting class. As a freshman, she immediately earned the starting goalkeeper role, appearing in 13 matches, recording 78 saves, and posting two matches with 11 saves each.

During her sophomore season in 2019, she started all 19 games, registered 69 saves, and maintained a goals-against average of 0.98 while collecting six solo shutouts. Her performances earned her Pac-12 Goalkeeper of the Week honors on November 12 and a selection to the CoSIDA Academic All-District First Team.

In 2020, Skiba again started every match for Oregon State, compiling 58 saves and a 1.71 goals-against average over 16 appearances, and she was recognized as the team's Most Inspirational Player with the program's Benny Award.

As a senior in 2021, she started all 19 matches and played 1,673 minutes, earning another Pac-12 Goalkeeper of the Week nod on November 8 after a standout performance against Oregon. By the end of her collegiate career, Skiba ranked fourth in Oregon State program history in career saves (286) and fifth in solo shutouts (12). She was also named to the Pac-12 Academic Honor Roll for her achievements in the classroom.

== Professional career ==
=== Chicago Red Stars ===
In 2022 and 2023, Skiba spent time with the Chicago Red Stars of the National Women's Soccer League, serving as a national team replacement goalkeeper during the 2023 FIFA Women's World Cup period.

=== HB Køge ===
Later that year, she signed with HB Køge in Denmark, competing in the Danish top division, the Kvindeligaen. While with HB Køge, she featured in league play and took part in the UEFA Women's Champions League following the club's domestic title win.

In April 2023, Skiba sustained a forehead injury during a league match against Brøndby IF that required stitches, but she returned to play the following week. Team manager Camille Larsen applied the stitches and later noted that this was the first time she had stitched a player without anesthesia.

In September 2023, Skiba was in goal and made several key saves as HB Køge earned a 1–1 home draw against Juventus in the UEFA Women's Champions League qualifying round. Speaking through the team's Facebook page, she said, "I'm very happy and proud of my whole team. We couldn't have done it without the team's defense. I'm ecstatic that we got a draw. We're ready to bounce back. It's about our mentality, and we're going to take that into next week and hopefully beat them."

=== Lexington SC ===
In July 2024, Skiba returned to the United States to join Lexington SC ahead of their inaugural season in the USL Super League.

For her efforts with Lexington, she was named to USL Super League Team of the Month for December 2024.

=== Stjarnan ===
After spending time with Lexington, went abroad again to play for Stjarnan in Iceland's Besta deild kvenna.

== Style of play ==
As a goalkeeper, Skiba is noted for her shot-stopping ability, athleticism, and use with her feet—qualities highlighted when she was recruited to Oregon State.

== Records & honors ==
USL Super League

- Team of the Month: December 2024

Oregon State

- 4th in career saves: 286
- 5th in career solo shutouts: 12

Pac-12

- Goalkeeper of the Week: Nov. 8, 2021.

CoSIDA

- Academic All-District First Team: 2019.

== Personal life ==
Skiba is the daughter of Kristi and Phil Skiba, and has a brother, Hayden. While at Oregon State she majored in psychology and served as the community-service chair for the student-athlete advisory committee (SAAC).
