= Julie Mackin =

American soccer player (born 1998)

Personal information
- Full name: Julie Ann Mackin
- Date of birth: February 15, 1998 (age 28)
- Height: 5 ft 7 in (1.70 m)
- Positions: Defender; forward

Youth career
- Real Colorado

College career
Years	Team	Apps	(Gls)
2016–2019	Clemson Tigers	82	(7)

Senior career*
Years	Team	Apps	(Gls)
2018	Charlotte Lady Eagles	–	(–)
2022–2024	Greenville Liberty SC	29	(7)
2024–2025	Lexington SC	24	(1)
- * Club domestic league appearances and goals

Julie Ann Mackin (born February 15, 1998) is an American former professional soccer player who played as a defender and forward. She played collegiate soccer at Clemson University and represented the United States at various youth levels.

== Early life ==
Mackin grew up in Castle Rock, where she played youth soccer for Real Colorado. During her high school career at Castle View High School she was named the 2016 Colorado Gatorade Girls Soccer Player of the Year, after recording 14 goals and 5 assists as a senior.

== College career ==
Mackin attended Clemson University from 2016 to 2019, where she became a four‑year starter for the Tigers. As a freshman she played in 23 games, starting 21, scoring 3 goals and 2 assists. During her junior season she started every game (21 starts) and in 2018 logged 1,481 minutes and netted her first goal since 2016. Academically, she earned CoSIDA Academic All‑District honors as a junior with a 4.00 GPA as a nursing major.

== Club career ==
After college, Mackin joined Greenville Liberty SC in the USL W League in 2022, where she was a starter and played every minute of every game over her two seasons. She also made guest appearances with the Charlotte Lady Eagles in the Women's Premier Soccer League (WPSL).

On June 28, 2024, it was announced she signed with Lexington SC’s for their inaugural USL Super League season. For her contributions, she was named to USL Super League Team of the Month for December 2024.

== International career ==
Mackin featured for the United States youth national teams, including the U‑14, U‑18 and U‑19 levels. She attended training camps and international friendlies, travelling with the U‑18s to La Manga and with the U‑19s to San Diego in 2018.

== Style of play ==
Mackin is versatile, having played both outside forward and outside back. Coaches describe her as having pace, strong dribbling ability, and tactical awareness.

== Personal life ==
She currently works as a nurse practitioner at Bon Secours in Greenville, South Carolina.

== Honors ==
USL Super League

- Team of the Month: December 2024

Gatorade

- Colorado Girls Soccer Player of the Year: 2016

Atlantic Coast Conference

- Offensive Player of the Week: August 2016

Academic All-America

- All‑District Women's Soccer Team: 2018
