= Maddy Perez =

American soccer player (born 2002)

Personal information
- Full name: Madison Rose Perez
- Date of birth: June 6, 2002 (age 24)
- Height: 5 ft 5 in (1.65 m)
- Position: Defender

Team information
- Current team: Asteras Tripolis F.C.

Youth career
- 2016-2020: West Covina Bulldogs

College career
Years	Team	Apps	(Gls)
2020–2023	Long Beach State	58	(4)

Senior career*
Years	Team	Apps	(Gls)
2024–2026	Lexington SC	31	(1)
2026–	Asteras Tripolis	0	(0)

International career
2019	United States U-20		
- * Club domestic league appearances and goals as of 6 August 2026

Madison Rose Perez (born June 6, 2002) is an American professional soccer player who plays as a defender for Greek A Division club Asteras Tripolis. She played college soccer for Long Beach State before starting her professional career with Lexington SC of the USL Super League.

== Early life ==
Perez attended West Covina High School, where as a freshman she already helped lead her team to a league championship and earned first-team all-league honors.

== College career ==
Perez attended California State University, Long Beach (Long Beach State), where she played NCAA Division I soccer for the Long Beach State Beach (formerly the 49ers). In 2021, following the cancellation of the 2020 season due to the COVID-19 pandemic, Perez started 17 of 18 matches, playing every minute in 15 of them and logging 1,651 minutes. She ranked fourth on the team in points and was named Big West Freshman of the Year, earning selections to both the All-Big West First Team and Big West All-Freshman Team.

The following season, in 2022, Perez started all 21 matches, appearing in over 99% of the team’s total minutes with 1,804. She repeated as a First Team All-Big West honoree and was named to the United Soccer Coaches (USC) All-West Region Third Team.

The 2023 season saw Perez again start every match (20 total) and lead the team with 1,805 minutes played. She received First Team All-Big West honors for a third consecutive season and was again selected to the United Soccer Coaches All-West Region Third Team. Following the 2023 season, Perez announced via social media that she would forego her final year of NCAA eligibility to pursue a professional career.

== Club career ==
=== Lexington SC ===
Perez attended Lexington SC's open combine alongside former Long Beach State teammate Elysia Laramie. Following the combine, both players were offered professional contracts. After researching the club and league, Perez elected to forgo her remaining year of NCAA eligibility to sign professionally. On July 1, 2024, Lexington SC officially announced the signing of Perez to their inaugural USL Super League roster. In the club’s first professional women's match on August 25, 2024, at Carolina Ascent FC, Perez started and delivered the assist from a corner kick which became the team’s first-ever USL Super League goal. The goal was headed in by teammate Sydney Shepherd. For her performances, Perez was named to the USL Super League Team of the Month for September and October 2024, respectively. In the 2024–25 season, she emerged as a set-piece specialist, recording five assists from dead-ball situations and logging over 2,000 minutes across 24 starts. On May 31, 2025, Perez scored her first professional goal — a bending free kick that curled over the defensive wall and into the back of the net.

The following season, Perez lost her starting spot, making 7 total appearances and earning only one start. She helped Lexington win the league championship and the Players' Shield, making them the first team to complete the league double. At the end of the season, Perez departed from Lexington upon the expiration of her contract.

=== Asteras Tripolis ===
On 6 August 2026, Perez was announced to have signed for Asteras Tripolis in the Greek A Division.

== International career ==
At the youth national level, Perez earned call-ups to the United States youth national teams at U-16, U-17, U-18 and U-20 levels — most recently appearing for the U-20s in a friendly against Japan in 2019.

== Personal life ==
Perez majored in Communication Studies while at Long Beach State. She has an older brother, AJ, who played soccer at Cal Poly.

== Honors and awards ==
Lexington SC

- USL Super League: 2025–26
- USL Super League Players' Shield: 2025–26

Individual

- USL Super League Team of the Month: September 2024, October 2024
- Big West Freshman of the Year: 2021
- First-team All-Big West: 2021, 2022, 2023
