= Autumn Weeks =

American soccer player (born 2001)

Personal information
- Full name: Autumn Sierra Weeks
- Date of birth: October 20, 2001 (age 25)
- Place of birth: East Peoria, Illinois, U.S.
- Height: 5 ft 7 in (1.70 m)
- Position: Defender

Youth career
- FC Peoria

College career
Years	Team	Apps	(Gls)
2019–2021	IU Indy Jaguars	45	(5)
2022–2023	Louisville Cardinals	31	(1)

Senior career*
Years	Team	Apps	(Gls)
2021	Chicago Red Stars Reserves		
2022–2023	Racing Louisville FC (USL W)		
2024	Lexington SC (USL W)	7	(1)
2024–2025	Lexington SC	16	(0)
2025	Asheville City SC	5	(0)
2025	Odysseas Moschatou	10	(2)
- * Club domestic league appearances and goals as of 28 December 2025

Autumn Sierra Weeks (born October 20, 2001) is an American professional soccer player who plays as a defender. She played college soccer for the IU Indy Jaguars and the Louisville Cardinals. She has previously played professionally for USL Super League club Lexington SC and Greek club Odysseas Moschatou.

== Early life ==
Weeks grew up in East Peoria, Illinois, where she played club soccer for FC Peoria. She attended Peoria Notre Dame High School, where she helped contribute to 3 straight sectional championships and was twice named to All-Region and All-State teams.

== College career ==
=== IU Indy Jaguars ===
Weeks kicked off her collegiate career with the IU Indy Jaguars. She played in 20 games (starting 17 of them) in her rookie season and was subsequently named to the Horizon League's All-Freshman team. On October 2, 2019, she scored her first two college goals in a victory over UIC. The following season, Weeks started IUPUI's campaign on a high note, netting the game-winning goal against Cleveland State in the team's season opener. IUPUI progressed to the Horizon League Tournament, where Weeks was named to the conference's All-Tournament Team. In her final year with the Jaguars, she starred in 16 matches and also was named Second Team All-Horizon.

=== Louisville Cardinals ===
Ahead of the 2022 college season, Weeks transferred to the University of Louisville and joined the Cardinals. On August 18, 2022, she scored a debut goal to help Louisville earn a 3–0 win to kick off its season. The goal, just like Weeks' first IUPUI goal, was netted against UIC. Weeks went on to star in all 18 matches for the Cardinals, playing 769 minutes. In her final college season, she started in 8 of her 15 appearances and increased to 998 minutes on the year. Louisville played their final match of the season on October 26, 2023, against Duke, whom they had never previously beaten. Weeks tallied her first collegiate assist in the match, which ended as a victory for the Cardinals.

== Club career ==
Throughout her college career, Weeks spent her offseasons gaining experience with pre-professional clubs. In 2021, she played for the Chicago Red Stars Reserves and helped the team win the Lake Michigan Conference championship. The next three years, she played for USL W League clubs, spending two seasons with Racing Louisville FC and one with Lexington SC.

After completing college, Weeks spent time with the professional counterparts of her USL W League teams. She attended a pro day with Racing Louisville FC's National Women's Soccer League squad and tried out for Lexington SC's upcoming USL Super League team. Weeks made it onto Lexington's squad, but, hopeful to join the NWSL, she delayed signing a contract until after hearing results from the league's 2024 Draft. She went undrafted and subsequently inked her first professional deal with Lexington. Weeks made 16 appearances in her rookie year as Lexington finished in last place and failed to qualify for the playoffs. She was responsible for one goal contribution, an assist in a match against Dallas Trinity FC on November 9, 2024. At the end of the season, Lexington SC announced that Weeks would be departing from the club.

Following her experience with Lexington, Weeks joined Asheville City SC for the 2025 USL W League season. She helped contribute to Asheville City's run into the USL W League playoffs, where the club was eliminated in the semifinals by North Carolina Courage U23; Weeks came on as a substitute in the eventual 2–1 loss. She made 5 total appearances for Asheville City.

On August 24, 2025, Weeks signed with Greek club Odysseas Moschatou.
