= Marykate Loper =

American soccer player (born 2000)

Personal information
- Full name: Marykate McGuire Loper
- Birth name: Marykate Francis McGuire
- Date of birth: March 4, 2000 (age 26)
- Place of birth: Providence, Rhode Island, U.S.
- Height: 5 ft 4 in (1.63 m)
- Position: Forward

Team information
- Current team: Charleston Cougars (assistant)

Youth career
- New England FC
- Boston Breakers Academy

College career
Years	Team	Apps	(Gls)
2018–2021	Duke Blue Devils	80	(19)
2022	Ole Miss Rebels	14	(7)

Senior career*
Years	Team	Apps	(Gls)
2023	Team Boca Blast	–	(5)
2024–2025	Lexington SC	19	(4)

Managerial career
- 2026–: Charleston Cougars (assistant)
- * Club domestic league appearances and goals

Marykate McGuire Loper (née McGuire; born March 4, 2000) is an American soccer coach and former professional player who is currently an assistant coach for the Charleston Cougars. She played college soccer for the Duke Blue Devils and the Ole Miss Rebels before spending one season playing professionally for USL Super League club Lexington SC.

== Early life ==
Loper was born in Providence, Rhode Island, to former University of Rhode Island collegiate athletes Matt McGuire and Karen Amber. She started off playing club soccer with New England FC and was the US Youth Soccer National Championship top scorer as the club won the tournament in 2013. Loper also played for the Boston Breakers Academy and Rhode Island's ODP team, being named the state ODP Player of the Year in 2013.

Loper played high school soccer for Portsmouth High, although she spent one season at St. George's School as a sophomore. Despite missing her senior season of play with a knee injury, Loper was thrice named Rhode Island's Gatorade Player of the Year and totaled 81 goals across both programs.

== College career ==
=== Duke Blue Devils ===
Loper dreamed of playing Division I college soccer since elementary school and verbally committed to Duke University as a high school freshman. She joined the Blue Devils program in 2018 and played in all 17 of Duke's games in her first year. Loper scored her first collegiate goal on August 26, 2018, in a 3–0 victory over the Elon Phoenix. Her 7 freshman assists, including one in the NCAA tournament second round, ranked for third-most on the team.

The following year, Loper had a breakout season. She led the Blue Devils with 9 goals and was able to record a four-game goal streak in September 2019. Loper then kicked off her junior year with a bang, scoring two goals in the season opener against Wake Forest and earning ACC Offensive Player of the Week honors. She was the team leader in assists and contributed to the Blue Devils reaching the NCAA Elite Eight. At the end of the season, Loper was named to the All-ACC Academic Team and the ACC Academic Honor Roll. As a senior, Loper added 17 more matches and 4 goals to her tally. She finished her time at Duke with 80 appearances and 19 goals to her name.

=== Ole Miss Rebels ===
After her four years at Duke, Loper transferred to the University of Mississippi in order to pursue a Master of Arts degree. She used the extra year of eligibility granted to athletes due to the COVID-19 pandemic to also play a fifth year of soccer. Loper tallied her first goal with the Ole Miss Rebels in the team's season opener, a 5–0 victory over Southeastern Louisiana on August 18, 2022. Loper ended up earning 14 appearances (all starts) and recorded 7 goals, averaging a goal every other game.

== Club career ==
Loper registered for the 2023 NWSL Draft but was ultimately not selected. She then joined Team Boca Blast in the amateur Women's Premier Soccer League. Loper scored 5 goals and registered 1 assist for the Floridan club in her single season of play. Boca Blast did not return to the WPSL in 2024.

On June 17, 2024, Loper signed a contract with Lexington SC ahead of the inaugural USL Super League season. She scored her first Super League goal in Lexington's home stadium debut, which was a 3–2 defeat to Tampa Bay Sun FC. In October and November, Loper had a run of scoring 3 goals within 6 games, bringing her total goal tally to 4 going into the league's mid-season break. She totaled 19 appearances (11 starts) with Lexington before departing from the club at the end of the season.

== International career ==
In 2013, Loper received her first youth international call-up, joining the United States U-14 team for a training camp in Carson, California. She later received call-ups to U-16 and U-18 camps in 2015 and 2017, respectively.

== Coaching career ==
In March 2026, Loper joined the coaching staff of the Charleston Cougars women's soccer team as an assistant coach.

== Career statistics ==
=== Club ===
Appearances and goals by club, season and competition
Club	Season	League			Cup		Playoffs		Total	
Club	Season	Division	Apps	Goals	Apps	Goals	Apps	Goals	Apps	Goals
Lexington SC	2024–25	USL Super League	19	4	—		—		19	4
Career total			19	4	0	0	0	0	19	4
