= Kailey Utley =

American soccer player (born 1993)

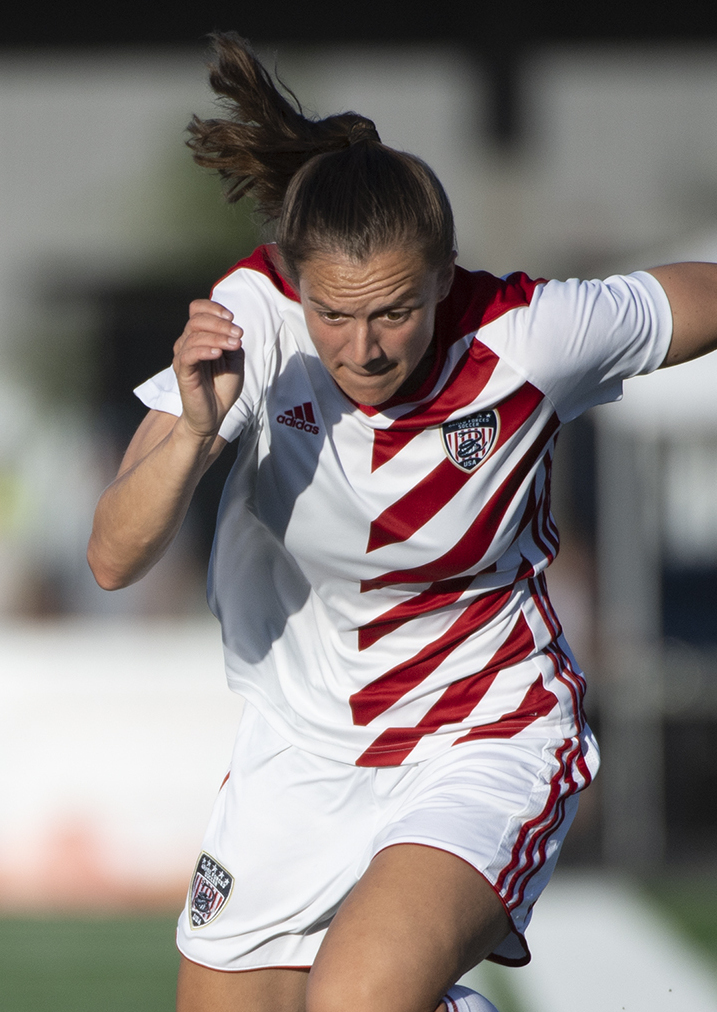
- Utley at the World Military Cup in 2022

Personal information
- Full name: Kailey Nicole Utley
- Date of birth: December 17, 1993 (age 32)
- Height: 5 ft 4 in (1.63 m)
- Position: Forward

Youth career
- St. Louis Scott Gallagher

College career
| Years | Team | Apps | (Gls) |
| 2012–2015 | West Virginia Mountaineers | 85 | (18) |

Senior career*
| Years | Team | Apps | (Gls) |
| 2016–2018 | Fire and Ice SC | | (27) |
- FC Olympia
| 2021–2022 | FC Olympia (indoor) | | (25) |
| 2022 | Pacific Northwest SC | | |
| 2023–2024 | Lexington SC (USLW) | 7+ | (4+) |
| 2024–2025 | Lexington SC | 14 | (1) |
| 2025–2026 | Louisville Triumph (indoor) | | |
- * Club domestic league appearances and goals

Kailey Nicole Utley (born December 17, 1993) is an American former professional soccer player. She played college soccer for the West Virginia Mountaineers before spending stints with multiple semi-professional clubs. She played one season professionally with USL Super League club Lexington SC to end her career.

== Early life ==
Utley is a native of St. Louis, Missouri, United States. She started playing soccer at the age of five before eventually joining local side St. Louis Scott Gallagher SC. She attended Pattonville High School, where she made the school's varsity team as a freshman. She soon became a major offensive threat for her school, recording multiple hat-tricks and braces, being named to various All-Metro, All-Region, and All-Midwest teams, and contributing to several district titles. Utley also played basketball and softball at Pattonville High, making her a tri-sport athlete.

== College career ==
Utley played four years of college soccer at West Virginia University. As a junior in 2014, she scored 5 goals across 22 matches en route to her third of four career Big 12 Conference titles. Two of her goals came in an October 2014 match against Oklahoma State, in which she scored both the game-tying goal and overtime match-winner to help the Mountaineers inch closer to winning the conference.

As a senior in 2015, Utley set career-highs, scoring 12 goals and notching 6 assists to rank second in the conference in total points and fourth in the nation with seven game-winning goals. Her performances earned her a spot on the All-Big 12 first team, Big 12 all-tournament team, and all-region first team. In November 2015, she recorded a second-half hat-trick against Loyola Marymount in her final-ever collegiate home game to help West Virginia win, 5–2, and advance to the NCAA tournament Elite Eight for the second time in program history; the Mountaineers were then eliminated from the competition by Penn State in what Utley believed to be her final career match of soccer.

== Club career ==
In the 2016 National Women's Soccer League preseason, Utley was invited to train with FC Kansas City as a trialist, but did not make the team's final roster. Instead, Utley joined semi-professional club Fire and Ice SC, where she helped lead the team to the 2017 Women's Premier Soccer League championship title after scoring 11 goals and tallying 2 assists in an undefeated season. While enrolled in optometry school, she continued playing for Fire and Ice, netting a total of 27 goals in her multi-season career. Utley also spent time playing indoor soccer locally in a recreational Vetta Sports league.

Utley then moved to Washington, where she played one season of outdoor soccer with FC Olympia. In 2021 and 2022, she played for FC Olympia's indoor soccer team, setting a single-season goals scored record in 2022.

In 2022, as a member of the United States Army, Utley participated in the Women's Military World Football Cup. She helped the United States outscore opponents 18–6 and finish the tournament in fourth place, the team's best finish since 2004. She later joined semiprofessional side Pacific Northwest SC, where she was named the Northwest Conference Offensive Player of the Year.

In 2023, Utley signed for USL W League club Lexington SC. She set the club record in goals scored at the time of her departure in 2024.

In the summer of 2024, Lexington SC's professional team announced that they had signed Utley ahead of the inaugural USL Super League season. On August 25, 2024, Utley made her pro debut, starting and playing the entirety of Lexington's first-ever game, a 1–1 draw with the Carolina Ascent. She scored her first professional goal on September 13, netting the opening goal in a defeat to the Dallas Trinity after going on an individual run that involved evading defender Hannah Davison before scoring past the goalkeeper. On February 13, 2025, Utley announced her retirement from soccer. She had made 14 appearances (4 starts) in her sole professional season.

Since retiring from playing professionally, Utley has returned to dabbling in indoor soccer. She was a member of the Louisville Triumph FC team that participated in the 2025–26 MASLW season.

== Personal life ==
At West Virginia University, Utley majored in Biology. In the fall of 2016, she enrolled in an optometry program at the University of Missouri–St. Louis and earned a full-ride scholarship to become an officer in the United States Army the following year. Utley's decision followed in the footsteps of her two grandfathers, both of whom served in the United States military, and her brother, who also joined the Army. Utley eventually served as an Army optometrist at Joint Base Lewis–McChord before playing professionally for Lexington SC.

Since retiring from professional soccer, Utley has stayed in Kentucky and continued to work as an optometrist.

== Honors and awards ==
West Virginia Mountaineers

- Big 12 Conference: 2012, 2013, 2014, 2015
- Big 12 Conference women's soccer tournament: 2013, 2014

Fire and Ice SC

- Women's Premier Soccer League: 2017

Individual

- First-team All-Big 12: 2015
- Big 12 tournament all-tournament team: 2015
