= Nicole Vernis =

American soccer player (born 2001)

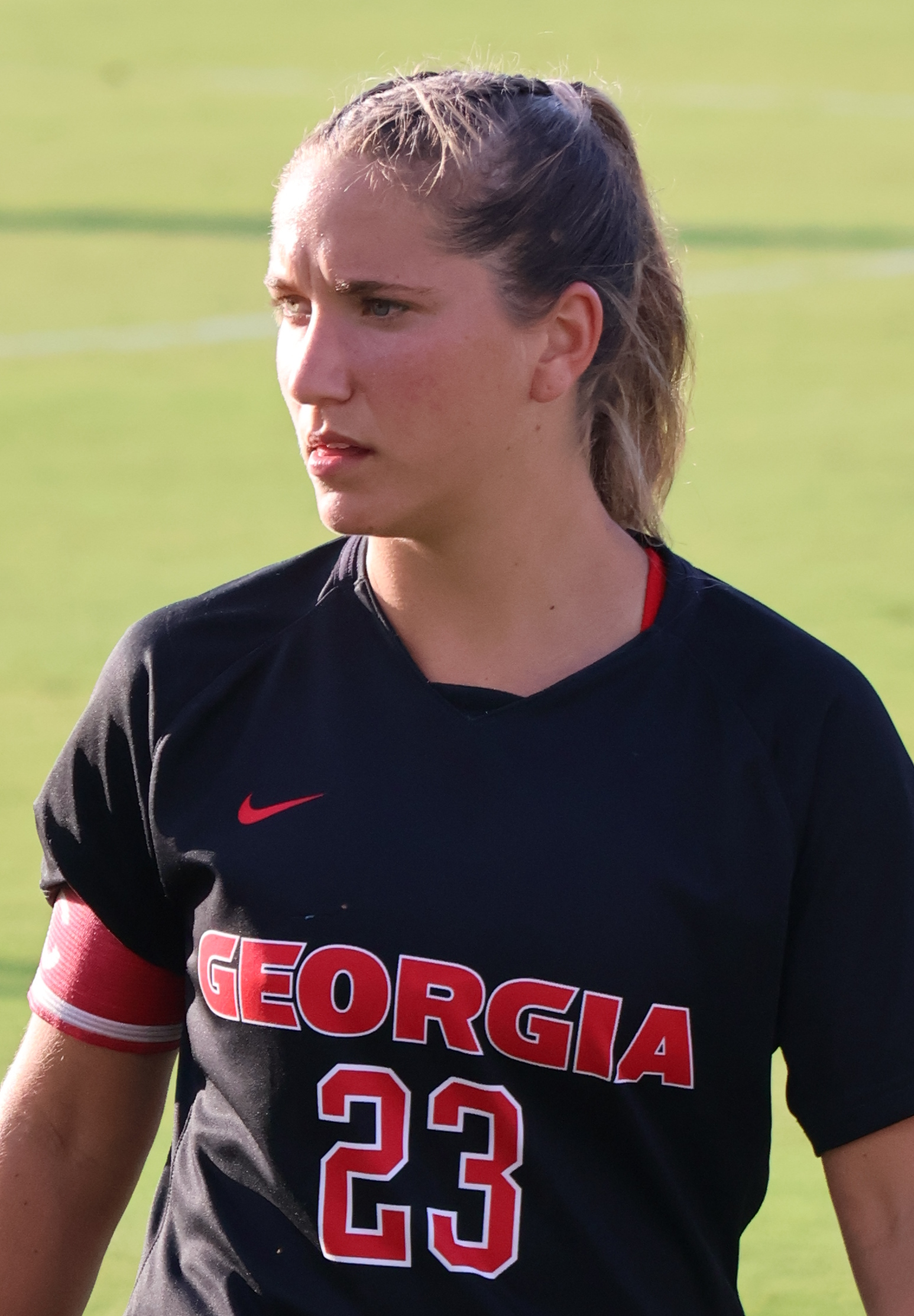
- Vernis with Georgia in 2024

Personal information
- Full name: Nicole Marie Vernis
- Date of birth: January 15, 2001 (age 25)
- Height: 5 ft 4 in (1.63 m)
- Position: Midfielder

Team information
- Current team: Lexington SC
- Number: 23

Youth career
- FC Florida
- Palm Beach Garden Predators
- 2016–2019: The Benjamin School

College career
Years	Team	Apps	(Gls)
2019–2021	Florida Gators	36	(3)
2022–2024	Georgia Bulldogs	44	(9)

Senior career*
Years	Team	Apps	(Gls)
2025–	Lexington SC	22	(2)
2025	→ Lazio (loan)	1	(0)
2026	→ Fort Lauderdale United (loan)	6	(1)
- * Club domestic league appearances and goals as of 16:27, September 26, 2026 (UTC)

Nicole Marie Vernis (born January 15, 2001) is an American professional soccer player who plays as a midfielder for USL Super League club Lexington SC. She played college soccer for the Florida Gators and the Georgia Bulldogs.

== Early life ==
Vernis grew up in North Palm Beach, where she attended The Benjamin School. As a youth player, she also played for FC Florida and the Palm Beach Gardens Predators. In high school, she earned All‑Palm Beach County honors and was named the 2019 Sun Sentinel Palm Beach 3A‑1A Player of the Year.

== College career ==
Vernis began her collegiate career at the University of Florida, where she played in every match in the 2020‑21 and 2021 seasons, tallying 36 appearances and contributing 3 goals offensively. In 2022, she transferred to the University of Georgia and red‑shirted that season per transfer regulations.

During the 2023 season with Georgia, she started 23 matches, ranking first on the team in various offensive categories including shots and assists, and scored in the NCAA Tournament second round. In 2024 she was named team captain, tied for team lead in assists, and was honored with Second Team All‑Southeastern Conference (SEC) and United Soccer Coaches (USC) All‑Southeast Region Second Team awards.

== Club career ==
On January 20, 2025, Vernis signed with Lexington SC of the USL Super League. She made her professional debut on February 15, 2025 against Carolina Ascent FC, and in her first half‑season she started 12 matches, scored 2 goals, and played just over 1,000 minutes. For her contributions, she was named to the USL Super League Team of the Month for February 2025. Her scoring includes a goal in the season finale against DC Power FC, which ended in a 3–3 draw. In June 2025, it was announced that she would return to Lexington SC for the 2025–26 season.

On August 13, 2025, Lazio of Serie A Femminile announced the acquisition of Vernis on loan from Lexington. Two months into her loan spell, Vernis was reported by Lazio as having returned to the United States without authorization from the club. Vernis' agent separately claimed she had an injury and hadn't received a salary since her arrival in Italy.

On January 29, 2026, Vernis was officially recalled to Lexington; she had made four appearances across all competitions for Lazio. Upon her return, she helped Lexington win the league championship and the Players' Shield, making them the first team to complete the league double.

On July 31, 2026, Vernis was sent back on loan to fellow league club Fort Lauderdale United for the entire fall season. She started all six of Fort Lauderdale's opening set of matches, scoring one goal, before being recalled to Lexington on September 24.

== Honors and awards ==
Georgia Bulldogs

- 2023 SEC women's soccer tournament: 2023

Lexington SC

- USL Super League: 2025–26
- USL Super League Players' Shield: 2025–26

Individual

- USL Super League Team of the Month: February 2025
- Second-team All‑SEC: 2024
