= Madi Parsons =

American soccer player (born 2000)

Personal information
- Full name: Madison Parsons
- Date of birth: December 6, 2000 (age 25)
- Place of birth: Sacramento, California, USA
- Height: 5 ft 9 in (1.75 m)
- Position: Forward

College career
Years	Team	Apps	(Gls)
2018–2022	Chico State Wildcats	17	(6)

Senior career*
Years	Team	Apps	(Gls)
2024–2025	Lexington SC	27	(6)
2025–2026	Tampa Bay Sun	15	(2)
- * Club domestic league appearances and goals as of 22:23, April 2, 2026 (UTC)

Madison Parsons (born December 6, 2000) is an American professional soccer player who plays as a forward. She played college soccer for the Chico State Wildcats before starting her professional career with USL Super League clubs Lexington SC and Tampa Bay Sun FC.

== Early life ==
Raised in Shingle Springs, she played youth soccer for Blues FC, coached by Sean-Michael Callahan, competing in the NorCal Premier League, considered the third tier of girls' youth soccer in California. Parsons credits Callahan for laying the foundation of her technical skills and soccer understanding. Parsons attended Ponderosa High School, where she earned Capital Valley Conference MVP honors as a junior, was named First Team All-CVC three consecutive years, and was a two-time team MVP.

== College career ==
Parsons attended California State University, Chico (Chico State), where she majored in Accounting. Parsons redshirted in 2018 and did not see game action in 2019 due to injuries that required two knee surgeries. She was recognized as a 2020–21 California Collegiate Athletic Association (CCAA) All-Academic honoree and received the Division II Athletic Directors Association Academic Achievement Award for the same academic year.

The COVID-19 pandemic affected Parsons' junior year, and she played a shortened season in 2020–21, scoring 6 goals and 1 assist in 17 games and 5 starts. She also set a CCAA Conference record for the fastest hat-trick, scoring three goals in 3 minutes and 4 seconds.

== Club career ==
=== Lexington SC ===
Despite limited exposure in high-level youth and collegiate programs, Parsons pursued professional soccer through open tryouts. She was encouraged by her college coaches and local players and gained attention from her agent. In December 2023, Parsons attended an open tryout for Lexington SC, one of the inaugural teams in the newly established USL Super League. She impressed the coaching staff and was offered a professional contract and became one of the few players to transition from NCAA Division II collegiate soccer without prior ECNL/Girls Academy experience into a professional Tier 1 league in the United States. Parsons played a key midfield role during the club's debut campaign. Eight games into her professional career, she ranked second in the league in goals and points, and was tied for first in goal contributions. She was named USL Super League Player of the Month for October 2024. The following month, November 2024, she was once again named to the USL Super League Team of the Month. On June 25, 2025, Lexington SC announced that Parsons was among the players not retained for the 2025–26 season.

=== Tampa Bay Sun ===
On November 7, 2025, Parsons signed with Tampa Bay Sun FC of the USL Super League. She made 15 appearances and scored 2 goals as Tampa Bay finished second to last in the league standings. On June 12, 2026, the Sun announced that Parsons would not be returning to the club for a second season.

== Personal life ==
Parsons is the daughter of Kenneth and Amber Parsons and has eight siblings. She cites her parents as her heroes and admires Carli Lloyd for leadership and dedication. Parsons enjoys Netflix, spending time with friends, and hopes to pursue a Master's degree in accounting. She also aspires to travel to South Africa to see a great white shark breach.

== Honors and awards ==
USL Super League

- Player of the Month: October 2024
- Team of the Month: October 2024, November 2024

College

- CCAA All-Academic: 2020–21
- NCAA Division II ADA Academic Achievement Award: 2020–21
- CCAA record fastest hat-trick: 3 minutes, 4 seconds: 2021
