= Sintia Cabezas =

Colombian footballer (born 2006)

Personal information
- Full name: Sintia Vanesa Cabezas Vanegas
- Date of birth: 1 May 2006 (age 20)
- Height: 1.58 m (5 ft 2 in)
- Position: Winger

Team information
- Current team: Les Marseillaises
- Number: 19

Senior career*
Years	Team	Apps	(Gls)
2022–2024	América de Cali		
2025	San Diego Wave	0	(0)
2025	→ Lexington SC (loan)	5	(0)
2025	→ Levante UD (loan)	9	(0)
2026–	Les Marseillaises	4	(0)

International career^{‡}
2022–	Colombia U20	24	(0)
Medal record
Women's football
Representing Colombia
FIFA U-20 Women's World Cup
Third place	2026 Poland
- * Club domestic league appearances and goals as of 23:05, 27 September 2026 (UTC) ‡ National team caps and goals as of 20 March 2025

Sintia Vanesa Cabezas Vanegas (born 1 May 2006) is a Colombian professional footballer who plays as a winger for Première Ligue club Les Marseillaises.

== Club career ==
Cabezas grew up in Cali. In 2022, she said she aspired to play at the college level in the United States and French club Paris Saint-Germain. Cabezas played for Colombian Women's Football League club América de Cali from 2022 to 2024, with the club choosing not to renew her contract ahead of the 2025 season.

On 20 January 2025, the NWSL's San Diego Wave FC announced that they had signed Cabezas on a two-year contract and would loan her to USL Super League club Lexington SC for the year. Cabezas made five appearances with Lexington as the team finished at the bottom of the USL Super League table. On 18 July 2025, the Wave loaned Cabezas out once again, this time on a season-long spell with Spanish club Levante UD.

In January 2026, Cabezas transferred to French club Les Marseillaises for an undisclosed fee plus a percentage of sell-on fees.

== International career ==
Cabezas debuted for Colombia's under-20 team when she was 16. She helped them qualify for the 2022 FIFA U-20 Women's World Cup, playing all seven games and starting five at the 2022 South American Under-20 Women's Football Championship as they finished runner-up to Brazil. Two years later, she started all nine games during the 2024 South American Under-20 Women's Football Championship, where they finished in third place. Colombia hosted the 2024 FIFA U-20 Women's World Cup, where Cabezas played every minute of regulation for the team, helping them top their group with three shutout wins. In the round of 16, she assisted Linda Caicedo in a 1–0 win against South Korea, before they were eliminated on penalties after a 2–2 draw against the Netherlands.

== Honours ==
Colombia U20

- FIFA U-20 Women's World Cup third place: 2026
