= Madelen Holme =

Norwegian footballer (born 2002)

Personal information
- Full name: Madelen Koldal Holme
- Date of birth: 20 February 2002 (age 24)
- Position: Striker

Youth career
- Gneist

Senior career*
Years	Team	Apps	(Gls)
2017–2018	Sandviken	2	(0)
2019–2022	Arna-Bjørnar	17	(0)
2022	Levante	0	(0)
2023–2024	Åsane	1	(0)
2024	Lexington SC	0	(0)

International career
2017	Norway U15	4	(0)
2018	Norway U16	13	(8)
2020	Norway U18	3	(0)
- * Club domestic league appearances and goals

Madelen Kolden Holme (born 20 February 2002) is a Norwegian footballer who most recently played for Lexington SC of the USL Super League.

== Early life ==
Holme started playing football young and played with fourteen-year-olds at ten. Holme was regarded as a Norwegian prospect.

== Career ==
She started her career with the Norwegian side Sandviken, where she suffered a ligament injury. In 2022, she signed for Spanish side Levante. In January 2023, she left the team under a mutual release agreement. In June 2024, it was announced that she signed for Lexington SC, an inaugural member of the new top-flight USL Super League in the United States.

== Style of play ==
Holme mainly operates as a striker and is left-footed. She is known for her technical ability.
