= Regan Steigleder =

American soccer player (born 1998)

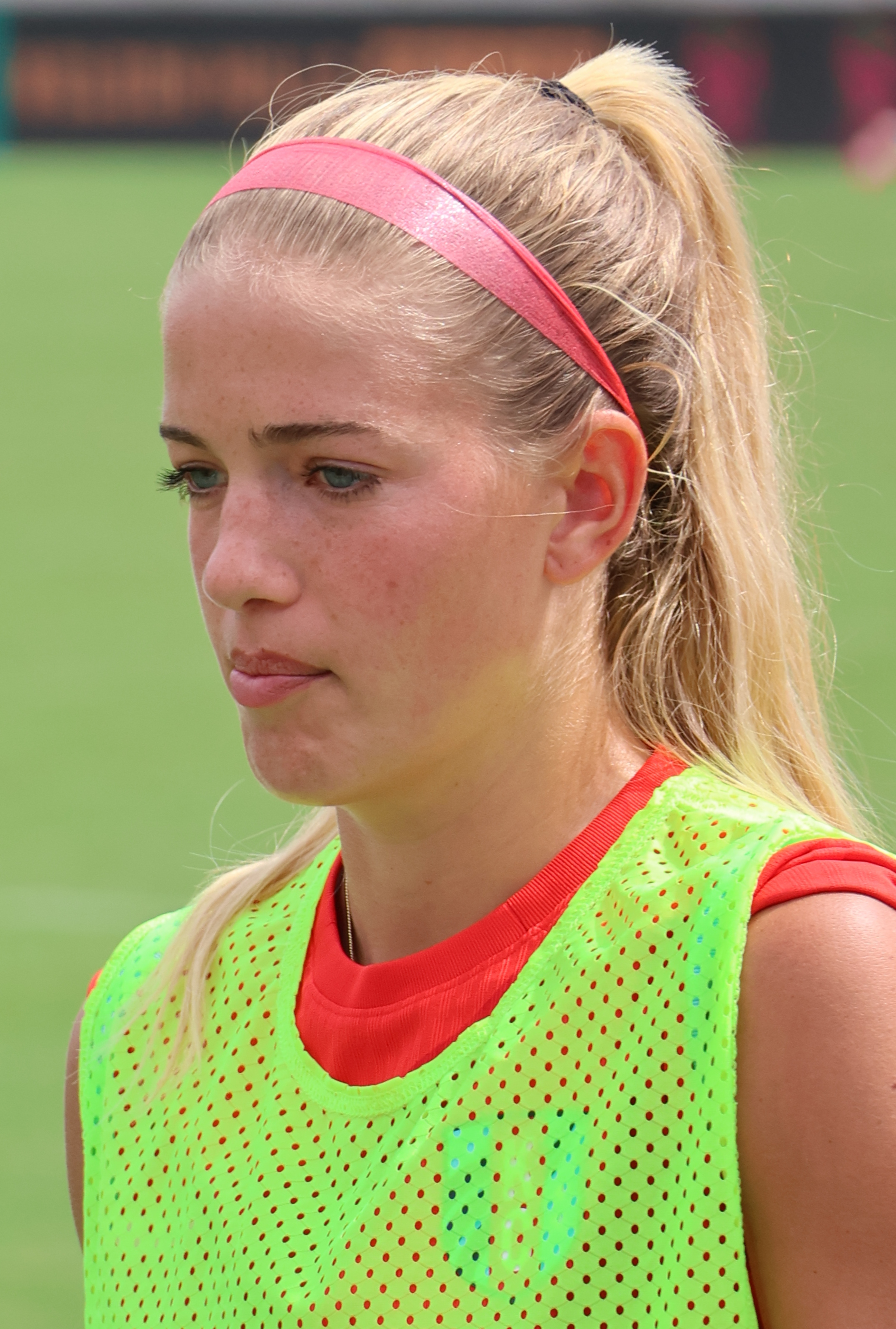
- Steigleder with the Kansas City Current in 2024

Personal information
- Full name: Regan Leigh Steigleder
- Date of birth: September 3, 1998 (age 28)
- Height: 5 ft 7 in (1.70 m)
- Position: Defender

Team information
- Current team: Lexington SC
- Number: 22

College career
Years	Team	Apps	(Gls)
2017–2021	Northwestern Wildcats	86	(12)

Senior career*
Years	Team	Apps	(Gls)
2022–2023	KIF Örebro	49	(4)
2024–2025	Kansas City Current	4	(0)
2026–	Lexington SC	14	(0)
- * Club domestic league appearances and goals as of May 16, 2026

Regan Leigh Steigleder (born September 3, 1998) is an American professional soccer player who plays as a defender for USL Super League club Lexington SC. She played college soccer for the Northwestern Wildcats. She began her professional career with Swedish club KIF Örebro in 2022, before moving to the Kansas City Current in 2024.

== Early life ==
Steigleder was raised in Iowa City, Iowa, the daughter of Paul and Lisa Steigleder. Her mother named her after Regan MacNeil, the fictional character possessed by a demon in the horror film The Exorcist. She began playing soccer when she was three and joined the Iowa Soccer Club in kindergarten. She began playing travel soccer in middle school with a club based in Phoenix, Arizona, before playing two years with the Michigan Hawks. She played almost anywhere on the field for the Hawks and won the ECNL under-17 national championship in 2016.

She captained her high school soccer team at Iowa City West, where she scored 93 goals in four years. She led her team to the state 3A championship as a junior in 2015, providing an assist and then scoring the winning goal in a 2–1 victory. She reached the state semifinals and was named the Gatorade Iowa Player of the Year as a senior in 2016. She also played one season of high school basketball as a freshman point guard. She initially committed to Vanderbilt, but after its head coach resigned, she switched to Northwestern over offers from Iowa, Nebraska, TCU, and Clemson.

== College career ==
Steigleder was a five-year starting midfielder for the Northwestern Wildcats, scoring 12 goals in 86 appearances. In her first season in 2017, she helped her team place second in the Big Ten Conference and make it to the final of the conference tournament, earning Big Ten all-freshman honors. She left the game injured against Purdue as a sophomore in 2018 and missed the rest of the season.

Steigleder played the most minutes on the team as a junior in 2019 and was named to the All-Big Ten third team. She scored four goals in the pandemic-shortened 2020 season, including the only goal in a win over Purdue in the first round of the Big Ten tournament. She was granted a fifth year of eligibility due to the pandemic and became one of the team's captains in her graduate year in 2021. She led the team in field minutes played and tied her career high with four goals.

== Club career ==
=== KIF Örebro ===
Steigleder trained with the Chicago Red Stars as a non-roster player in the 2022 preseason and appeared in a preseason friendly against the United States national under-23 team. She then signed her first professional contract with Swedish club KIF Örebro DFF on April 8, 2022, for the rest of the year. She entered the usual starting lineup following the departure of Anna Sandberg to Häcken and was converted from an attacking midfielder to an offensive-minded left back. She finished the 2022 Damallsvenskan season with 13 starts in 24 appearances, with KIF Örebro ninth of fourteen teams. On November 3, her contract was extended for an additional year. She started all 25 games in which she played in the 2023 season.

=== Kansas City Current ===
Steigleder re-signed with KIF Örebro for another year on December 22, 2023, and was considered a possible captain for the coming season. However, on January 30, 2024, she was instead traded to the NWSL's Kansas City Current for a transfer fee, signing a one-year contract with the option to extend another year. She made her NWSL debut on March 30, coming on as a late substitute for Bia Zaneratto in a 4–2 win against Angel City FC. She was used rarely during the season, making only 7 appearances with 2 starts in all competitions, as the Current finished fourth in the standings. After her contract option was exercised, she made only one competitive appearance the following year, a substitute cameo in a 4–1 victory over the Chicago Stars on September 26, 2025, as Kansas City won the NWSL Shield.

=== Lexington SC ===
In January 2026, Steigleder signed as a free agent with USL Super League club Lexington SC. She immediately assumed a starting role for the club, debuting in a 3–1 win over Fort Lauderdale United at the end of the month. She helped the club post the best defense in the league as they won the Players' Shield with the best record. On May 30, 2026, she scored her first Lexington goal in the league final against the Carolina Ascent, putting them up 2–1. She was named the championship game MVP after Lexington won 3–1, becoming the first team to complete the league double. At the end of the season, Lexington re-signed Steigleder to a new one-year contrac, keeping her in Kentucky for another season.

== Personal life ==
Steigleder is in a relationship with Kansas City Chiefs player Jack Cochrane.

== Honors and awards ==
Kansas City Current

- NWSL Shield: 2025
- NWSL x Liga MX Femenil Summer Cup: 2024

Lexington SC

- USL Super League: 2025–26
- USL Super League Players' Shield: 2025–26

Individual

- Third-team All-Big Ten: 2019
- Big Ten all-freshman team: 2017
