= Shea Moyer =

American soccer player (born 1998)

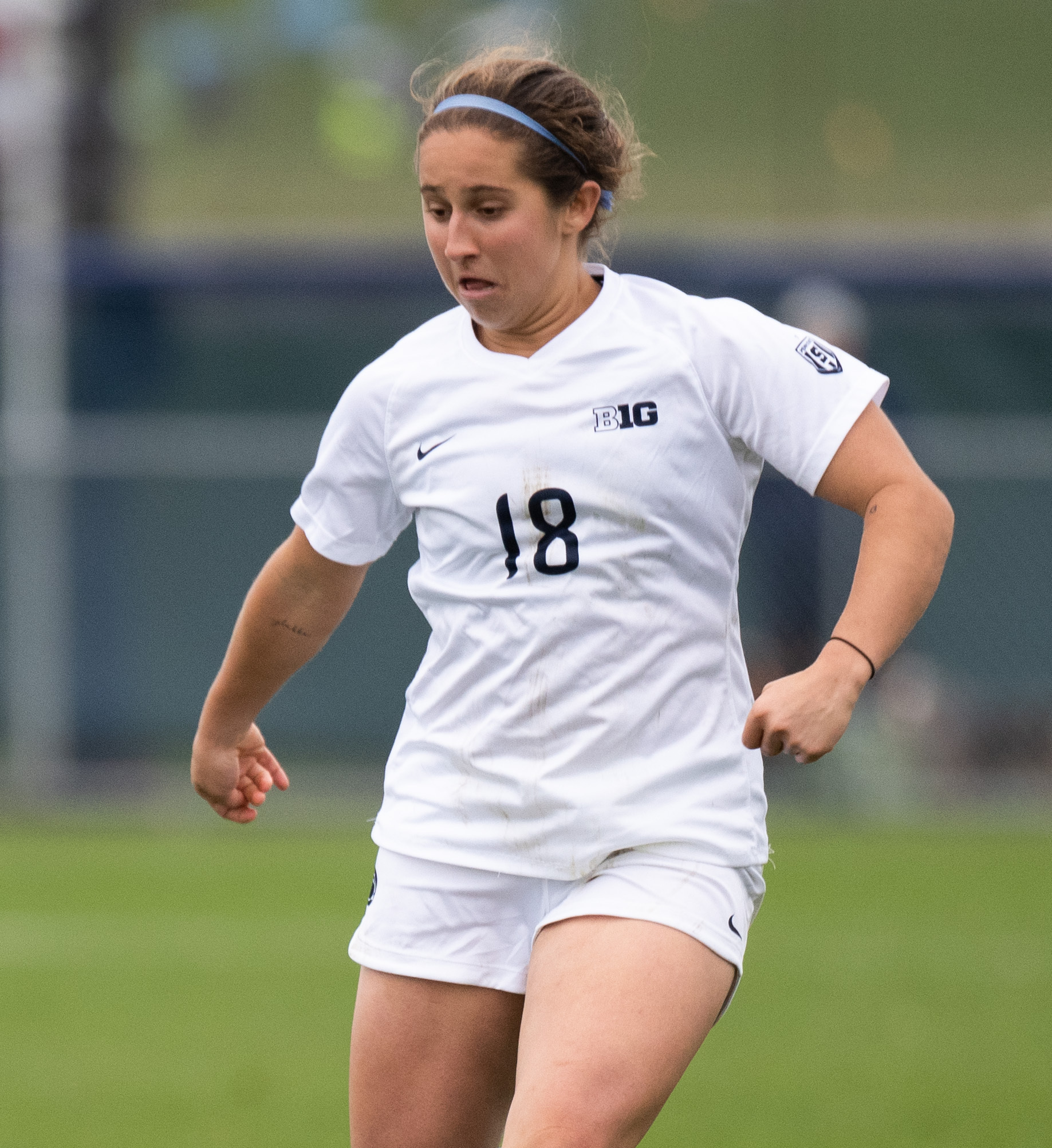
- Moyer with Penn State in 2018

Personal information
- Date of birth: December 28, 1998 (age 27)
- Place of birth: Bethlehem, Pennsylvania, United States
- Height: 5 ft 4 in (1.63 m)
- Position: Midfielder

Team information
- Current team: Fort Lauderdale United
- Number: 8

Youth career
- FC Revolution
- Penn Fusion

College career
Years	Team	Apps	(Gls)
2017–2019	Penn State Nittany Lions	43	(3)

Senior career*
Years	Team	Apps	(Gls)
2021	Throttur		
2021–2022	ASA Tel Aviv University		
2023	Throttur		
2023–2024	ASA Tel Aviv University		
2024	Ankara BB Fomget GSK	14	(1)
2024–2026	Lexington SC	48	(5)
2026	→ Fort Lauderdale United (loan)	6	(0)
2026–	Fort Lauderdale United	0	(0)

International career
- United States U18
- * Club domestic league appearances and goals as of 01:09, July 9, 2026 (UTC)

Shea Moyer (born December 28, 1998) is an American professional soccer player who plays as a midfielder for USL Super League club Fort Lauderdale United FC. She played college soccer for the Penn State Nittany Lions. She has previously been a member of Icelandic club Throttur, Israeli club ASA Tel Aviv University, Turkish club GSK, and USLS club Lexington SC.

== Early life and college career ==
Moyer was born in Bethlehem, Pennsylvania, and played for Wyomissing Area Junior/Senior High School.

She played for her college soccer team Penn State Nittany Lions between 2017 and 2019. She could not finish the 2019 season due to an injury, a form of anterior cruciate ligament (ACL) tear suffered in her right knee after the second match. She scored three goals in 43 games played in her college soccer career.

Moyer was also with the clubs FC Revolution during her high school years and after the college, as well as Penn Fusion.

== Club career ==
In March 2021, Moyer went to Iceland and signed a one-year contract with Reykjavík-based club Throttur. After the 2021 season, she moved to Israel and joined ASA Tel Aviv University to play in the Ligat Al Nashim. In 2022, she returned to Iceland and her former club Throttur. She played in the 2023–24 season again for ASA Tel Aviv University.

Mid-January 2024, she moved to Turkey and signed a deal with Ankara BB Fomget GSK for the second half of the 2023–24 Women's Super League. She appeared in 14 matches and scored one goal. Her team finished the season as runners-up.

On July 12, 2024, it was announced that Moyer would be joining Lexington SC as part of the club's inaugural roster to compete in the new top-flight women's soccer league in the USA, the USL Super League. In her first season with Lexington, Moyer started all 28 of the team's matches, scored two goals, and recorded 5 assists. She was named to the All-League Second Team at the end of the season, the only Lexington player to earn a postseason award that year.

In her second season with Lexington, Moyer lost her starting role, coming on as a substitute in all but three 3 of her 20 matches played. In April 2026, Lexington sent Moyer out on loan to Fort Lauderdale United FC through the remainder of the 2025–26 season. After her loan spell ended, Moyer re-joined Fort Lauderdale permanently in July 2026.

== International career ==
Moyer was called up to 15 youth training camps of the United States national team during her school years. She was named to the United States national team at under-14, under-15, under-18, under-19, and under-20 levels. She was part of the United States under-20 team who played in the 2016 Women's International Cup in Ireland.

== Personal life ==
Shea Moyer was born to former successful Penn State Nittany Lions athletes Jerry and Janeen Moyer in Bethlehem, Pennsylvania. Her father was an All-Region selection, MVP in 1984, and captain for the men's soccer team, and her mother was a successful member of the swimming team.

After graduating from the Wyomissing Area Junior/Senior High School, she attended Pennsylvania State University in the spring 2017. Majoring in kinesiology, she graduated in December 2020. She is a certified personal trainer.
