= Lexington SC (women) =

American USL soccer club

Lexington Sporting Club
- Full name: Lexington Sporting Club
- Nickname: Gals in Green
- Short name: Lexington SC; Lex SC; LSC
- Founded: October 5, 2021; 5 years ago
- Stadium: Lexington SC Stadium; Lexington, Kentucky
- Capacity: 7,500
- Owner(s): Bill and Donna Shively; Stephen Dawahare
- President: Vince Gabbert
- Sporting Director: Michelle Rayner
- Coach: Kosuke Kimura
- League: USL Super League
- 2025–26: USL Super League, 1st of 9; Playoffs: Champions
- Website: lexsporting.com/women
Home colors	Away colors

Lexington Sporting Club is an American professional women's soccer club based in Lexington, Kentucky, that competes in the USL Super League (USLS). The club also fields a team in the USL W League (USLW).

== USL Super League ==
=== Inaugural season ===
In May 2023, the USL announced that LSC would be an inaugural member of the USL Super League, kicking off in 2024 alongside Carolina Ascent FC, Brooklyn FC, Dallas Trinity FC, Spokane Zephyr FC, Tampa Bay Sun FC, Fort Lauderdale United FC, and DC Power FC, with Chattanooga, Indianapolis, Jacksonville, Madison, and Oakland set to join in subsequent seasons.

The USL Super League (USLS) is a Division I professional women's soccer league in the United States. The league will be owned and operated by the United Soccer League. Originally planned to launch in August 2023, it is now slated to begin play in August 2024.

On January 9, 2024, the club announced Michael Dickey as the women's first team inaugural head coach for the inaugural 2024 season scheduled to kick off in August.

On September 8, 2024, the USL Super League team played the first ever game at the newly built Lexington SC Stadium in front of a crowd of 3,946 - the largest in the club's history across all teams.

== USL W League ==
Announced in October 2022, Lexington SC participated in the USL W League a pre-professional women's soccer league in the United States which began play in May 2023. The team competes in the Valley Division alongside Indy Eleven, Kings Hammer FC, Racing Louisville Academy, and St. Charles FC. The inaugural team played its matches at Toyota Stadium (Kentucky). Former National Women's Soccer League player Morgan Proffitt notably appeared in a handful of matches for the inaugural team.

== Supporters ==
The Railbirds are the only officially recognized supporters group for the club. The group was founded in August 2022 by Jesus Robles, Sam Spencer, Jon Lunsford, and Alan Clark.

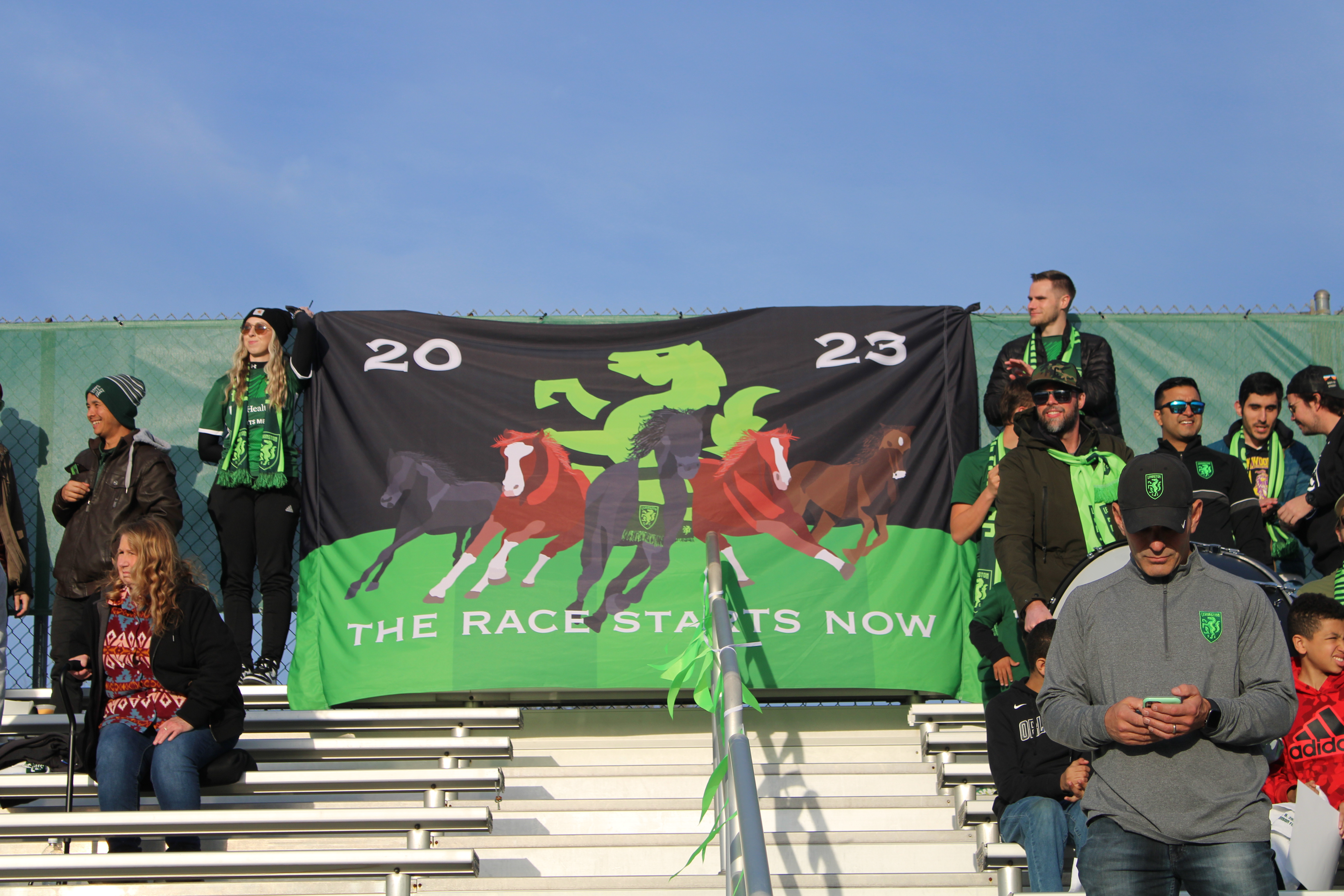
The Railbirds unveil their "The Race Starts Now" tifo before the kickoff of Lexington's inaugural home match at Toyota Stadium.

The group's name is inspired by the horseracing term "Railbird" – a person who hangs on the fence of a horse track, cheering for their horse and helping to give that final push across the finish line.

The group supports all teams that the club fields, including the men's teams that play in USL League One.

== Colors and crest ==
Per the club's website, the crest and colors are broken down as follows-

Typography – "Our name, Lexington Sporting Club, is emblazoned in typography inspired by bourbon barrels. The letters are reminiscent of the barrels' graceful curves, giving our name the weight of local history and tradition."

The Shield – "The shield reflects the longstanding traditions of soccer. The heraldic silhouette recalls soccer club crests from the sport's early days during the Victorian Era. And the tapered shape perfectly frames our horse and our name."

The Horse – "Horses are synonymous with Lexington, the horse capital of the world. People speak with pride about the majestic, athletic, powerful, animal. The design of our horse is distinct yet traditional. Rearing upward gives the crest a sense of energy and power, striking a balance of historical and contemporary."

The Colors – "Lexington's rolling hills and lush, leafy woodland that bolster Kentucky's major industries bourbon and horses inspire the colors for this design. Our community carries a strong sense of place, and we love the green colors that dominate our landscape."

Design process

The Lexington SC crest was designed by Christopher Payne, a designer whose work with soccer clubs in the United Kingdom and the United States includes Eastleigh Football Club, Flower City Union, Monterey Bay FC, and Appalachian FC. Payne coordinated with Lexington-based media and PR company Bullhorn Creative which oversaw project management, creative services, and messaging beyond the brand design.

Over several months, Lexington SC leadership held fourteen listening sessions with community members, gathering more than 300 responses to brand surveys and more than 1,500 responses to stadium surveys to identify key themes to reflect on the club's brand identity. Themes that emerged included the cultural landscape of the Bluegrass region and its lush green rolling hills and leafy woodlands, its equine and bourbon industries, and a communal sense of place.

Surrounded by over 400 horse farms, Lexington is often referred to as the "Horse Capital of the World". It was also the first city outside of Europe to ever host the World Equestrian Games. To reflect this heritage, as well as club ownership's involvement in the thoroughbred industry and President Vince Gabbert's professional connection to Keeneland Race Course, the crest features a vibrant green stylized horse figure set against a dark green background.

Payne developed a typeface called Lex Type specific for Lexington SC branding. He states, "Like a horse, Lex Type is tall, powerful, and athletic. However, if you look closely, you'll notice the typeface has subtle curves at the top and the bottom of the letters. This detail is inspired by the graceful curves of a bourbon barrel, tying the typography to this important element of local history and tradition."

=== Sponsorship ===
Seasons	Kit manufacturer	Shirt sponsor
2024 (USL Super League)	Nike	UK HealthCare Sports Medicine
2023-24 (USLW)	Nike	Badass Coffee of Hawaii
2025-26 USL-SL	Hummel	UK HealthCare Sports Medicine
2025 USLW	Hummel	Tru by Hilton

== Mascot ==
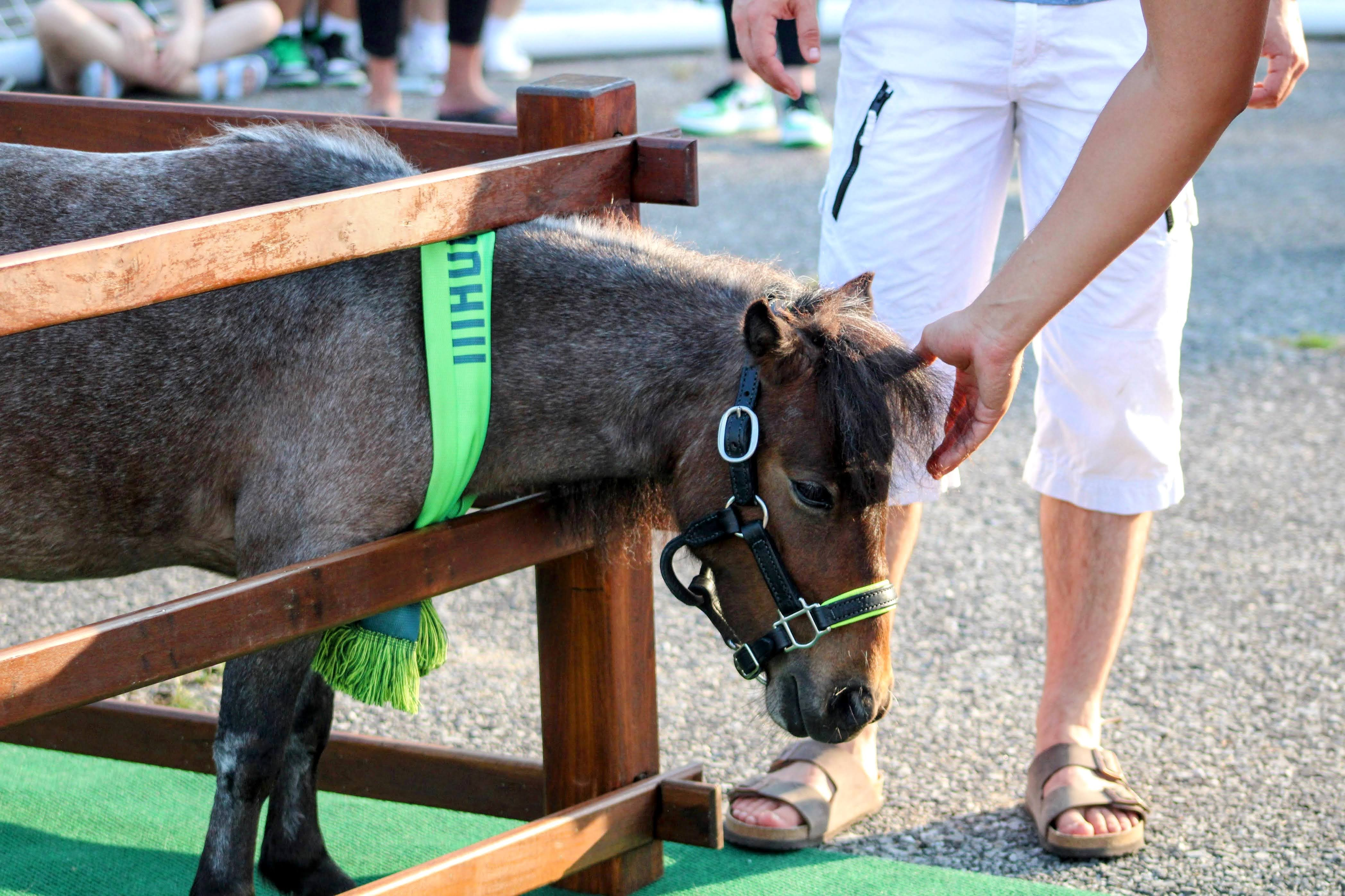
The club's mascot Thunder in her pen prior to kickoff

On May 12, 2023, LSC announced their official "mini" mascot Thunder, a miniature therapy horse stationed in the southwest corner of Toyota Stadium during matches. Thunder is very popular among fans, especially younger ones, and helped pave the way for the green horse found on the club's crest to be nicknamed Thunder by the fans after her.

== Stadium ==
Lexington SC's Super League team will be the first to play in Lexington SC Stadium, a new 7,500 soccer-specific stadium in the southeastern part of Lexington, Kentucky. The stadium will be the home for the club's 2 professional teams and is surrounded by the club's professional and academy training grounds.

== Players and staff ==
=== USL Super League current roster ===
As of October 14, 2026

Note: Flags indicate national team as defined under FIFA eligibility rules; some limited exceptions apply. Players may hold more than one non-FIFA nationality.

No.	Pos.	Nation	Player
2	FW	USA	Hannah White
3	DF	USA	Allison Pantuso
5	MF	USA	Ally Perry
6	MF	USA	Taylor Aylmer
7	GK	USA	Marz Josephson
10	MF	USA	Mac Midgley
11	FW	USA	McKenzie Weinert
12	DF	USA	Alyssa Bourgeois
15	FW	USA	Catherine Barry
16	DF	USA	Ally Brown

No.	Pos.	Nation	Player
18	MF	USA	Addie McCain
19	DF	USA	Hannah Johnson
20	MF	USA	Darya Rajaee
22	DF	USA	Regan Steigleder
23	MF	USA	Nicole Vernis
24	GK	USA	Ryan Campbell (on loan from Gotham FC)
26	MF	USA	Katie Murray
28	DF	USA	Cassie Rohan
35	FW	USA	Sarah Griffith
66	DF	USA	Gracie Falla

==== Out on loan ====
Note: Flags indicate national team as defined under FIFA eligibility rules; some limited exceptions apply. Players may hold more than one non-FIFA nationality.

No.	Pos.	Nation	Player
9	FW	USA	Amber Nguyen (at Fort Lauderdale United through December 31, 2026)
17	MF	USA	Tati Fung (at DC Power FC through December 31, 2026)

==== Academy players ====
Note: Flags indicate national team as defined under FIFA eligibility rules; some limited exceptions apply. Players may hold more than one non-FIFA nationality.

No.	Pos.	Nation	Player
13	DF	USA	McKenzie Hawkins
14	MF	USA	Bridget Kopmeyer

=== Former players ===
For details of former players, see Category:Lexington SC (women) players and List of Lexington SC (women) players.

=== Staff ===
As of December 9, 2025

Front Office
President	Vince Gabbert
Chief Operating Officer	Kim Shelton
USL Women's Technical Staff
Women's Sporting Director	Michelle Reyner
USL Super League Head Coach	Kosuke Kimura
USL Super League Assistant Coach	Taylor Leach
USL W-League Coach	Paul Dolinsky

== Team records ==
=== Year-by-year ===
USL Super League

As of December 14, 2024

Season	USL Super League										Playoffs	Top Scorer ^{1}		Head coach	Avg. Attendance
Season	Div	M	W	D	L	GF	GA	GD	Pts	Pos	Playoffs	Player	Goals	Head coach	Avg. Attendance
2024-25	1	28	4	6	18	29	62	-33	18	8th	DNQ	(United States) Madison Parsons	6	(United States) Michael Dickey (United States) Maren McCrary (interim) (England) Sam Stockley (interim)	1,531
2025-26	1	11	5	6	0	24	9	+15	21	1st	Champions	(United States) Catherine Barry	7	(Japan) Masaki Hemmi (Japan) Kosuke Kimura	1,920

USL W-League

As of July 22, 2025

Season	USL W League									Playoffs	Top Scorer ^{1}		Head coach
Season	M	W	D	L	GF	GA	GD	Pts	Pos	Playoffs	Player	Goals	Head coach
2023	10	3	1	6	10	17	−7	10	3rd	Did not qualify	(United States) Kailey Utley	4	(England) Alan Kirkup
2024	10	4	2	4	23	13	+10	14	3rd	Did not qualify	(United States) Makala Woods	6	(England) Alan Kirkup
2025	10	3	3	4	19	16	+3	12	4th	Did not qualify	(United States) Natalie Mitchell	8	(United States) Paul Dolinsky

1. Top Scorer includes statistics from league matches only.

=== Head coaches ===
USL Super League

- Includes Regular Season & Playoffs. Excludes friendlies.

Coach	Nationality	Start	End	Games	Win	Loss	Draw	Win %
Michael Dickey	United States	January 9, 2024	February 21, 2025	15	3	9	3	20.00
Maren McCrary (interim)	United States	February 21, 2025	March 1, 2025	2	0	1	1	0.00
Sam Stockley (interim)	England	March 1, 2025	July 3, 2025	11	1	8	2	9.09
Masaki Hemmi	Japan	July 3, 2025	December 9, 2025	12	5	7	0	41.67
Kosuke Kimura	Japan	December 9, 2025		2	0	2	0	0.00

USL W League

Coach	Nationality	Start	End	Games	Win	Loss	Draw	Win %
Alan Kirkup	(England)	October 18, 2022	June 29, 2024	20	7	3	10	42.5
Paul Dolinsky	(United States)	Unknown	Present	10	3	4	3	30.0

=== Team records ===
USL Super League

As of June 4, 2026. Current players in bold. Statistics are updated once a year after the conclusion of the USL Super League season.

Most appearances
Player					Appearances		
#	Name	Nat.	Pos.	Lexington career	USLS	Playoffs	Total
1	**Shea Moyer**	(United States)	MF	2024–	48	0	48
2	**Hannah White**	(United States)	FW	2025–	37	2	39
3	**Maddy Perez**	(United States)	DF	2024–	31	0	31
4	Kat Asman	(United States)	GK	2025–2026	28	2	30
4	**Taylor Aylmer**	(United States)	MF	2025–	28	2	30
4	**Catherine Barry**	(United States)	FW	2025–	28	2	30
4	**Alyssa Bourgeois**	(South Korea)	DF	2025–	28	2	30
8	**Sarah Griffith**	(United States)	FW	2025–	27	2	29
8	**Addie McCain**	(United States)	MF	2025–	27	2	29
8	**Allison Pantuso**	(United States)	DF	2025–	27	2	29

Top goalscorers
Player					Goals scored		
#	Name	Nat.	Pos.	Lexington career	USLS	Playoffs	Total
1	**Catherine Barry**	(United States)	FW	2025–	16	1	17
2	**McKenzie Weinert**	(United States)	FW	2025–	10	1	11
3	**Addie McCain**	(United States)	MF	2025–	9	1	10
4	Madison Parsons	(United States)	FW	2024–2025	6	0	6
5	**Shea Moyer**	(United States)	MF	2024–	5	0	5
5	**Sarah Griffith**	(United States)	FW	2025–	4	1	5
7	Marykate McGuire	(United States)	FW	2024–2025	4	0	4
7	Sydney Shepherd	(United States)	DF	2024–2025	4	0	4
9	Hannah Richardson	(United States)	FW	2024–2026	3	0	3

== League honors ==
USL Super League

USL W League

2024
Team of the Month
- Katelyn Fishnick - May

== Other honors ==
The Railbirds (Supporters Group)

Golden Horseshoe
2024 USLW Player of the Year - Makala Woods
