= 2023 Portland Thorns FC season =

Portland Thorns FC soccer season

Portland Thorns FC
2023 season
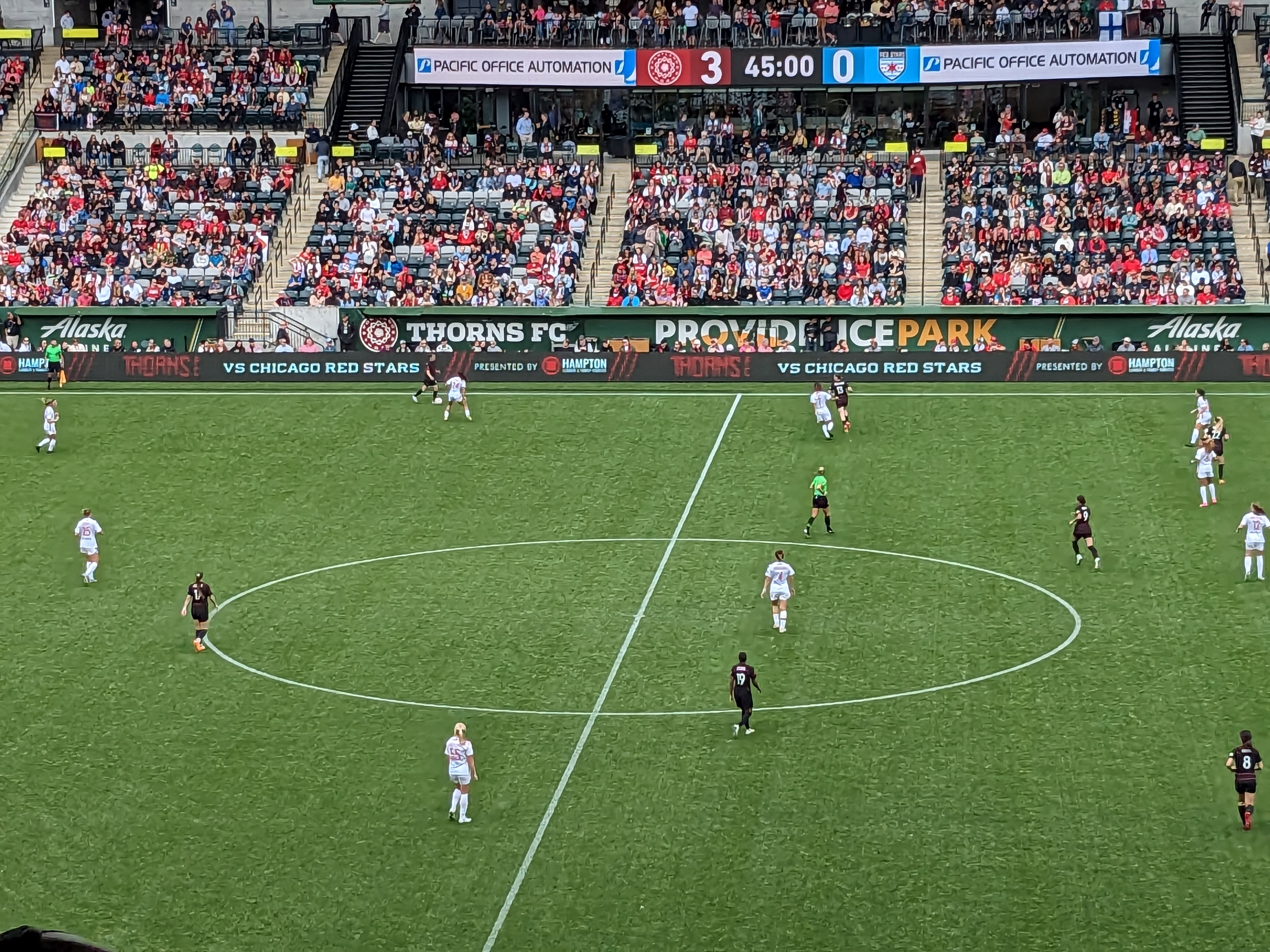
- Thorns at home vs. Chicago on May 21
- Owner: Merritt Paulson
- General manager: Karina LeBlanc
- Head coach: Mike Norris
- Stadium: Providence Park (capacity: 25,218)
- League: 2nd
- Challenge Cup: Group stage
- Playoffs: Semifinals
- Top goalscorer: Sophia Smith (10 goals)
- Highest home attendance: 25,218 (September 16 vs. OLR)
- Lowest home attendance: 14,972 (Apr 22 vs. LOU)
- Average home league attendance: 18,815
- Biggest win: 4–0 (Mar 26 vs. ORL) (May 21 vs. CHI)
- Biggest defeat: 1–3 (Jun 11 vs. ORL)
Home colors	Away colors
- All statistics correct as of July 21, 2023.

The 2023 Portland Thorns FC season was the team's eleventh season as a professional women's soccer team. Thorns FC played in the National Women's Soccer League (NWSL), the top tier of women's soccer in the United States.

== Background ==
Thorns FC are the league's defending champions after defeating the Kansas City Current 2–0 in the 2022 NWSL championship match. The championship was the club's third.

=== League discipline ===
In December 2022, first-year head coach Rhian Wilkinson resigned. The joint NWSL/NWSL Players Association (NWSLPA) report on league-wide abuse allegations revealed that Wilkinson allegedly self-reported having exchanged messages expressing mutual romantic feelings with Thorns FC player Emily Menges, who also served as treasurer of the NWSLPA. Wilkinson and Menges had previously been teammates when Wilkinson played for the Thorns in 2015. Wilkinson's resignation came in spite of the report also stating that Wilkinson did not violate league policies and did not suggest ending her employment.

In January 2023, following the release of the joint NWSL and NWSLPA report and subsequent allegations of league policy violations in the club's actions around Paul Riley, the NWSL fined Thorns FC $1 million, retroactively satisfied by a previous $1 million pledge by owner Merritt Paulson toward establishing an NWSL player safety office. Paulson also announced his intent to sell the Thorns. An early investment group led by former Nike executive Melanie Strong reportedly valued the Thorns at $60 million in a formal bid for a majority stake in the team.

The same investigation also alleged that Thorns FC head athletic trainer Pierre Soubrier inappropriately distributed medication containing codeine to players during the 2022 semifinals, and that assistant coach Sophie Clough inappropriately kissed a player's neck during the team's championship celebrations. The club terminated both employees' employment following the report's release.

=== Hirings ===
On January 10, 2023, Thorns FC announced the hiring of Mike Norris, an assistant on Wilkinson's Thorns FC staff and former Canadian women's national soccer team assistant and goalkeeper coach, as her replacement.

On March 23, Thorns FC announced the hiring of Rob Gale and Katie Quinlan as assistant coaches. Gale was formerly head coach and general manager of Canadian Premier League team Valour FC and a youth coach for the Canadian women's national team, and Quinlan was director of player development for Texas club Gulf Coast SC and head coach and technical director for Blackburn Rovers L.F.C.

== Summary ==
=== March/April ===
Thorns FC acquired Canadian forward Adriana Leon on a short-term loan from Manchester United on April 13.

In the April 29 match against Angel City FC, Thorns goalkeeper Bella Bixby scored a backheel goal in the final minutes of stoppage time to secure a 3–3 draw. The goal was the second in league history scored by a goalkeeper with both being equalizing goals scored in Providence Park by Thorns goalkeepers off stoppage-time corners in regular-season draws, following Michelle Betos's goal in a 1–1 draw against FC Kansas City on June 19, 2015.

Portland went undefeated in league play during April, winning three matches and drawing two to finish the month at the top of the table with 11 points, but lost its first Challenge Cup match of the season against San Diego Wave FC 0–1 on April 19.

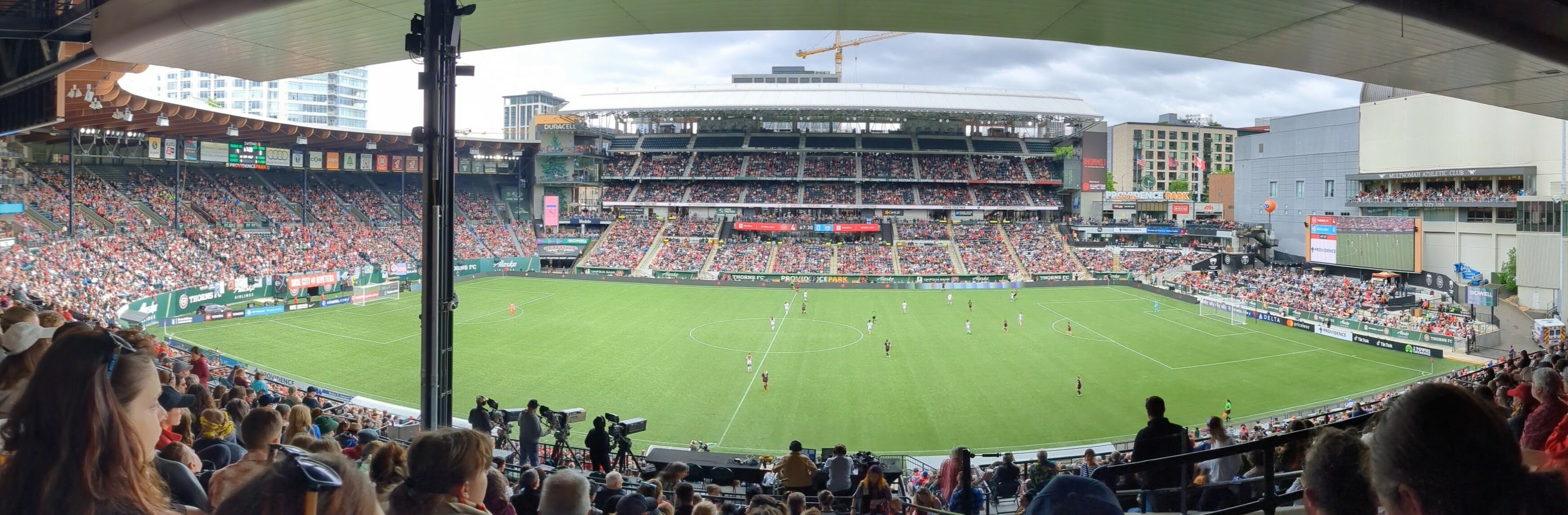
The Thorns' May 21 home match against Chicago Red Stars drew 20,402 in attendance, the team's largest regular-season attendance since 2019.

=== May ===
On May 6 on the road against North Carolina Courage, the Thorns finished with a second consecutive 3–3 draw. Former Courage player Crystal Dunn scored a brace, with Olivia Moultrie's 83rd-minute equalizer salvaging the point. The Thorns then suffered their first loss of the regular season against Houston Dash, taking an early lead on a Raquel Rodríguez goal but conceding to Joelle Anderson and Ebony Salmon in Houston.

The Thorns responded at home on May 21 by scoring three goals in the first 16 minutes and adding a fourth in the second half in a shutout win against Chicago Red Stars. The match featured the second career goal of center back Kelli Hubly. The match marked the third consecutive season that the Thorns had scored three goals on a team in the opening 16 minutes of a match, and the second time in three seasons that the Thorns had done so to Chicago.

The May 21 match drew an attendance of 20,402, the team's largest home attendance to a regular-season match since the 2019 season.

On May 26, the Thorns managed another late draw on the road, this time against San Diego Wave FC. Portland required a 90th-minute goal from rookie defender Reyna Reyes, her first professional score, from a Sam Coffey corner to equalize in the 1–1 tie.

=== June ===
The Thorns opened June with their first-ever win at Lumen Field by defeating Cascadian rivals OL Reign 2–0. The result was also the Thorns' first win against the Reign since the 2020 NWSL Fall Series. Sophia Smith broke a seven-match goalscoring drought, the longest such drought of her career, with her 17th-minute goal, and Christine Sinclair scored the Thorns' second tally in the 87th minute. Sinclair's goal marked the 60th match in all competitions in which she had scored, setting an NWSL record. The match was the second of a doubleheader with the Seattle Sounders FC and Timbers, who played to a scoreless draw; the combined event sold more than 42,000 tickets. Combined with a NJ/NY Gotham FC loss to San Diego Wave FC the following day, the result returned the Thorns to the top of the table.

On June 22, 2023, the Thorns permanently transferred midfielder Lindsey Horan to Olympique Lyonnais, where she had been on loan since January 2022. Lyon paid a transfer fee of €250,000 (US$274,000) with a conditional bonus of an additional €50,000 (US$54,750).

== Stadium and facilities ==
Thorns FC continued to play and train in Providence Park, their home since the team's inaugural season in 2013.

=== Player criticism ===
In an interview with ESPN on July 13, 2023, midfielder Lindsey Horan — who transferred from the Thorns to Olympique Lyon midseason while still on loan — cited the team's lack of a dedicated training facility compared to the Timbers, and lack of grass pitches for training and playing, in her decision to remain in France. Active Thorns players Meghan Klingenberg and Bella Bixby added public criticism of the Providence Park surface and Thorns's lack of training facility to The Oregonian on July 20.

== Broadcasting ==
Local Fox Broadcasting Company affiliate station KPTV agreed to stream eight regular season Thorns FC matches locally via FOX 12 PLUS. These were in addition to the league's national broadcast and streaming agreements with CBS and Paramount+ in the United States, and with The Sports Network in Canada.

== Team ==
=== Staff ===
As of April 1, 2023.

Technical
General manager President of Thorns FC operations	Karina LeBlanc
Head coach	Mike Norris
Assistant coach	Rob Gale
Assistant coach	Katie Quinlan
Assistant coach	Vytautas Andriuškevičius
Goalkeeper coach	Nadine Angerer
Medical
Assistant athletic trainer	Kelly Strasser
Performance specialist	Tom Milroy
Director of scouting and recruiting Youth sporting director	Mike Smith
Head physician	Breanne Brown

=== Squad ===
As of July 20, 2023.

No.	Pos.	Nat.	Name	Date of birth (age)	Since	Previous team	Notes
1	GK	(United States) USA	Bella Bixby	November 20, 1995 (aged 27)	2018	(United States) Oregon State	
18	GK	(United States) USA	Shelby Hogan	May 10, 1998 (aged 24)	2021	(United States) Providence College	
29	GK	(United States) USA	Lauren Kozal	July 11, 2000 (aged 22)	2023	(United States) Michigan State	
51	GK	(United States) USA	Lindsey Harris	November 19, 1993 (aged 29)	2023	(Portugal) S.F. Damaiense	GKR (Note: GKR: Goalkeeper Replacement signing)
48	DF	(United States) USA	Kayla Morrison	August 5, 1996 (aged 26)	2023	(Australia) Melbourne Victory FC	NTRP (Note: NTRP: Short-term National Team Replacement Player signing)
2	DF	(Mexico) MEX	Reyna Reyes	February 16, 2001 (aged 22)	2023	(United States) Alabama	
4	DF	(United States) USA	Becky Sauerbrunn	June 6, 1985 (aged 37)	2020	(United States) Utah Royals FC	
5	DF	(United States) USA	Emily Menges	July 28, 1992 (aged 30)	2014	(United States) Georgetown	
14	DF	(Finland) FIN	Natalia Kuikka	December 1, 1995 (aged 27)	2020	(Sweden) Kopparberg/Göteborg FC	INT (Note: INT: International player)
20	DF	(United States) USA	Kelli Hubly	August 9, 1994 (aged 28)	2017	(United States) DePaul	
25	DF	(United States) USA	Meghan Klingenberg	August 2, 1988 (aged 34)	2015	(United States) Orlando Pride	
29	DF	(United States) USA	Tegan McGrady	October 11, 1997 (aged 25)	2022	(United States) San Diego Wave FC	
39	DF	(United States) USA	Meaghan Nally	June 30, 1998 (aged 24)	2020	(United States) Georgetown	
45	DF	(United States) USA	Natalie Beckman	March 25, 2000 (aged 23)	2022	(United States) Denver	
8	MF	(Japan) JPN	Hina Sugita	January 31, 1997 (aged 26)	2022	(Japan) INAC Kobe Leonessa	INT
11	MF	(Costa Rica) CRC	Raquel Rodríguez	October 28, 1993 (aged 29)	2020	(United States) Sky Blue FC	
13	MF	(United States) USA	Olivia Moultrie	September 17, 2005 (aged 17)	2021	(United States) Beach FC	
17	MF	(United States) USA	Sam Coffey	December 31, 1998 (aged 24)	2021	(United States) Penn State	
19	MF	(United States) USA	Crystal Dunn	July 3, 1992 (aged 30)	2020	(United States) North Carolina Courage (Note: Rights acquired via OL Reign.)	
44	MF	(United States) USA	Gabby Provenzano	August 7, 1999 (aged 23)	2022	(United States) Rutgers	
46	MF	(United States) USA	Taylor Porter	September 29, 1997 (aged 25)	2021	(Spain) UDG Tenerife	
50	MF	(Colombia) COL	Isabel Dehakiz	July 19, 2000 (aged 22)	2023	(Colombia) Deportivo Cali	NTRP
9	FW	(United States) USA	Sophia Smith	August 10, 2000 (aged 22)	2020	(United States) Stanford	
12	FW	(Canada) CAN	Christine Sinclair	June 12, 1983 (aged 39)	2013	(United States) Western New York Flash	
15	FW	(United States) USA	Michele Vasconcelos	May 11, 1994 (aged 28)	2022	(United States) Kansas City Current (Note: Rights acquired following loan to Sevilla FC.)	
16	FW	(Canada) CAN	Janine Beckie	August 20, 1994 (aged 28)	2022	(England) Manchester City W.F.C.	SEI (Note: SEI: Season-ending injury)
22	FW	(United States) USA	Morgan Weaver	October 18, 1997 (aged 25)	2020	(United States) Washington State	
24	FW	(United States) USA	Izzy D'Aquila	September 8, 2001 (aged 21)	2023	(United States) Santa Clara	
33	FW	(United States) USA	Hannah Betfort	January 4, 1999 (aged 24)	2021	(United States) Wake Forest	
49	FW	(United States) USA	Alyssa Walker	November 30, 1997 (aged 25)	2023	(Norway) SK Brann	LOAN (Note: Signed to a short-term loan until September 1, 2023.)

== Competitions ==
=== NWSL Challenge Cup ===
Portland finished second in the West Division during the 2022 NWSL Challenge Cup and did not advance. Thorns FC returned to the West Division in the 2023 tournament.

==== Group stage ====
April 19, 2023	San Diego Wave FC	1–0	Portland Thorns FC	San Diego, California
7:00 p.m. PDT (UTC-7)	Enge (yellow card) 24'; Nally 65' (o.g.)	Report		Stadium: Snapdragon Stadium; Attendance: 9,504; Referee: Brandon Stevis

May 31, 2023	Portland Thorns FC	3–2	Angel City FC	Portland, Oregon
7:30 p.m. PDT (UTC-7)	Vasconcelos 23' (D'Aquila); D'Aquila 46' (Moultrie); Nally (yellow card) 86'; Weaver 90+3' (Sinclair)	Report	Le Bihan 61' (Camberos); Emslie 66' (pen.); Spencer (yellow card) 72'	Stadium: Providence Park; Attendance: 16,429; Referee: Adorae Monroy

June 28, 2023	Portland Thorns FC	0–1	OL Reign	Portland, Oregon
7:30 p.m. PDT (UTC-7)	Nally (yellow card) 54'	Report	Bennett 34' (Malonson)	Stadium: Providence Park; Attendance: 16,252; Referee: Matthew Thompson

July 21, 2023	Portland Thorns FC	4–1	San Diego Wave FC	Portland, Oregon
7:30 p.m. PDT (UTC-7)	Betfort 9', 58' (Klingenberg); Porter (yellow card) 36'; Weaver 54' (Betfort); Vasconcelos (yellow card) 56'; Reyes 61' (Klingenberg)	Report	Kornieck 81' (Shaw)	Stadium: Providence Park; Attendance: 16,393; Referee: Ricardo Fierro

July 29, 2023	Angel City FC	2–1	Portland Thorns FC	Los Angeles, California
7:00 p.m. PDT (UTC-7)	McCaskill 9', 47'	Report	Weaver 44'	Stadium: BMO Stadium; Attendance: 13,154; Referee: Brandon Stevis

August 6, 2023	OL Reign	0–0	Portland Thorns FC	Seattle, Washington
3:00 p.m. PDT (UTC-7)		Report		Stadium: Lumen Field; Attendance: 12,061; Referee: Matthew Corrigan

==== West Division standings ====
Pos	Team	Pld	W	T	L	GF	GA	GD	Pts	Qualification	RGN	LA	POR	SD
1	OL Reign	6	4	2	0	7	0	+7	14	Advance to knockout stage	—	0–0	0–0	1–0
2	Angel City FC	6	2	2	2	7	8	−1	8		0–2	—	2–1	2–1
3	Portland Thorns FC	6	2	1	3	8	7	+1	7		0–1	3–2	—	4–1
4	San Diego Wave FC	6	1	1	4	4	11	−7	4		0–3	1–1	1–0	—

Source: NWSL

==== Results by matchday ====
Matchday	1	2	3	4	5	6
Stadium	A	H	H	H	A	A
Result	L	W	L	W	L	D
Position	3	2	3	2		3

Updated to match(es) played on July 21, 2022. Source: NWSL
A = Away; H = Home; W = Win; D = Draw; L = Loss

=== Regular season ===
==== Matches ====
March 28, 2023 1	Portland Thorns FC	4–0	Orlando Pride	Portland, Oregon
2:00 p.m. PDT (UTC-7)	Weaver 16'; Smith 22' (Sinclair); Sugita 49'; Vasconcelos 76' (Smith)	Report	Cluff (yellow card) 10'; Doyle (yellow card) 70'	Stadium: Providence Park; Attendance: 15,204; Referee: Eric Tattersall

April 1, 2023 2	Kansas City Current	1–4	Portland Thorns FC	Kansas City, Kansas
11:30 a.m. CDT (UTC-5)	Kizer 58' (Loera)	Report	Dunn 3' (Coffey); Sugita (yellow card) 29'; Hubly (yellow card) 66'; Smith 18' (pen.), 83' (Klingenberg), 88'	Stadium: Children's Mercy Park; Attendance: 11,301; Referee: Natalie Simon

April 14, 2023 3	Portland Thorns FC	1–1	Houston Dash	Portland, Oregon
7:30 p.m. PDT (UTC-7)	Dunn	Report	Sánchez 24'	Stadium: Providence Park; Attendance: 15,657; Referee: Alex Billeter

April 22, 2023 4	Portland Thorns FC	2–0	Racing Louisville FC	Portland, Oregon
7:30 p.m. PDT (UTC-7)	Sinclair; Weaver (yellow card) 28' (goal) 45+4' (Smith); Coffey (yellow card) 32'	Report	Borges (yellow card) 67'; Fischer (yellow card) 74'; Pickett (yellow card) 90+4'	Stadium: Providence Park; Attendance: 14,972; Referee: Thomas Snyder

April 29, 2023 5	Portland Thorns FC	3–3	Angel City FC	Portland, Oregon
7:30 p.m. PDT (UTC-7)	Sugita 32' (pen.); Weaver 65' (Moultrie); Kuikka (yellow card) 77'; Bixby 90+7'	Report	Thompson 10' (Endo); Ertz (yellow card) 30' (goal) 79' (Le Bihan); Kuikka 74' (o.g.)	Stadium: Providence Park; Attendance: 16,938; Referee: Elton Garcia

May 6, 2023 6	North Carolina Courage	3–3	Portland Thorns FC	Cary, North Carolina
7:00 p.m. EDT (UTC-4)	Menges 1' (o.g.); Kerolin 26' (Williams); V. Pickett 70' (Wingate)	Report	Dunn; Kuikka (yellow card) 54'; Moultrie 83' (Kuikka); Smith (yellow card) 90'	Stadium: WakeMed Soccer Park; Attendance: 7,070; Referee: Alyssa Nichols

May 12, 2023 7	Houston Dash	2–1	Portland Thorns FC	Houston, Texas
7:30 p.m. CDT (UTC-5)	Anderson 59'; Salmon 71' (Sánchez)	Report	Rodríguez 34' (Moultrie); Nally (yellow card) 90'	Stadium: Shell Energy Stadium; Attendance: 4,638; Referee: Katja Koroleva

May 21, 2023 8	Portland Thorns FC	4–0	Chicago Red Stars	Portland, Oregon
2:00 p.m. PDT (UTC-7)	Hubly 8' (Coffey) (yellow card) 36'; Dunn 14' (Sugita); Moultrie 16' (Dunn); Kuikka 48' (Coffey)	Report	Bianchi (yellow card) 90'	Stadium: Providence Park; Attendance: 20,402; Referee: Tori Penso

May 26, 2023 9	San Diego Wave FC	1–1	Portland Thorns FC	San Diego, California
7:00 p.m. PDT (UTC-7)	Kornieck (yellow card) 77'; McNabb (yellow card) 83'; Jakobsson 86'	Report	Smith (yellow card) 20'; Reyes 90' (Coffey)	Stadium: Snapdragon Stadium; Attendance: 18,130; Referee: Elton García

June 3, 2023 10	OL Reign	0–2	Portland Thorns FC	Seattle, Washington
5:00 p.m. PDT (UTC-7)	Hiatt (yellow card) 21'; Cook (yellow card) 89'	NWSL report ESPN reporthttps://www.nwslsoccer.com/match/b42b1fa178624b7d9fc4feebdc15de7b/seattle-reign-vs-portland-thorns	Smith 17' (Sugita); Sinclair 87' (Weaver)	Stadium: Lumen Field; Attendance: 42,054; Referee: Brad Jensen

June 11, 2023 11	Orlando Pride	3–1	Portland Thorns FC	Orlando, Florida
7:00 p.m. EDT (UTC-4)	Adriana 26', 47' (Watt) (yellow card) 90+4'; Montefusco (yellow card) 64'; Bright 69'	Report	Hubly (yellow card) 8'; Smith 20' (Weaver); Kuikka (yellow card) 25'	Stadium: Exploria Stadium; Attendance: 7,319; Referee: Danielle Chesky

June 18, 2023 12	Chicago Red Stars	2–3	Portland Thorns FC	Bridgeview, Illinois
5:00 p.m. CDT (UTC-5)	St-Georges (yellow card) 58'; Stevens 72' (pen.); Schlegel 82' (Bianchi)	Report	Sugita (yellow card) 29' (goal) 63' (Weaver); Smith 43' (Kuikka); Bixby (yellow card) 65'; Sinclair 75' (Dunn); Hubly (yellow card) 79'	Stadium: SeatGeek Stadium; Attendance: 3,655; Referee: Anya Voigt

June 23, 2023 13	Portland Thorns FC	4–2	Washington Spirit	Portland, Oregon
7:30 p.m. PDT (UTC-7)	Smith 11' 23' 48'; Weaver 64'	Report	Hatch 13'; Sanchez 46'	Stadium: Providence Park; Attendance: 20,254; Referee: Katja Koroleva

July 1, 2023 14	Portland Thorns FC	0–1	Kansas City Current	Portland, Oregon
7:00 p.m. PDT (UTC-7)	Klingenberg (yellow card) 35'	Report	Cooper 36' (pen.)	Stadium: Providence Park; Attendance: 17,796; Referee: Tori Penso

July 9, 2023 15	NJ/NY Gotham FC	2–1	Portland Thorns FC	Harrison, New Jersey
5:30 p.m. EDT (UTC-4)	Long 21'; Purce (yellow card) 27'; Stengel 56'	Report	Bixby (yellow card) 6'; Betfort 62' (Klingenberg)	Stadium: Red Bull Arena; Attendance: 3,923; Referee: Greg Dopka

August 20, 2023 16	Portland Thorns FC	2–1	North Carolina Courage	Portland, Oregon
7:30 p.m. PDT (UTC-7)	Hubly (red card) 17'; Belfort 41'; Smith 69'	Report	Lussi 19'	Stadium: Providence Park; Attendance: 22,107; Referee: Matthew Thompson

August 27, 2023 17	Washington Spirit	1–1	Portland Thorns FC	Washington, D.C.
5:00 p.m. EDT (UTC-4)	Hatch 90+2' (pen.)	Report	Weaver 64'	Stadium: Audi Field; Attendance: 13,048; Referee: Jeremy Scheer

September 2, 2023 18	Racing Louisville FC	2–1	Portland Thorns FC	Louisville, Kentucky
7:30 p.m. EDT (UTC-4)	Erceg 60'; Kgatlana 64'	Report	Weaver 6'	Stadium: Lynn Family Stadium; Attendance: 5,778; Referee: Karen Callado

September 16, 2023 19	Portland Thorns FC	2–0	OL Reign	Portland, Oregon
7:30 p.m. PDT (UTC-7)	Sugita 30'; Weaver 36'; Klingenberg (yellow card) 58'	Report	Sonnett (yellow card) 29'	Stadium: Providence Park; Attendance: 25,218; Referee: Katja Koroleva

September 30, 2023 20	Portland Thorns FC	0–2	San Diego Wave FC	Portland, Oregon
7:30 p.m. PDT (UTC-7)		Report	Carusa 20' (Shaw); Morgan 38' (Westphal); Pogarch (yellow card) 77'; van Egmond (yellow card) 87'	Stadium: Providence Park; Attendance: 19,947; Referee: Calin Radosav

October 7, 2023 21	Portland Thorns FC	1–0	NJ/NY Gotham FC	Portland, Oregon
2:00 p.m. PDT (UTC-7)	Sugita 54'	Report		Stadium: Providence Park; Attendance: 19,599; Referee: Danielle Chesky

October 15, 2023 22	Angel City FC	5–1	Portland Thorns FC	Los Angeles, California
2:00 p.m. PDT (UTC-7)	Vignola 36'; Camberos 38'; McCaskill 47'; Leroux 51'; Endo 80'	Report	Sugita 79'	Stadium: BMO Stadium; Attendance: 22,000; Referee: Elvis Osmanovic

==== Regular season standings ====
Pos	Team	Pld	W	D	L	GF	GA	GD	Pts	Qualification
1	San Diego Wave FC (S)	22	11	4	7	31	22	+9	37	NWSL Shield, Playoff semifinals, and CONCACAF W Champions Cup
2	Portland Thorns FC	22	10	5	7	42	32	+10	35	Playoff semifinals and W Champions Cup
3	North Carolina Courage	22	9	6	7	29	22	+7	33	Playoff quarterfinals
4	OL Reign	22	9	5	8	29	24	+5	32	Playoff quarterfinals
5	Angel City FC	22	8	7	7	31	30	+1	31	Playoff quarterfinals
6	NJ/NY Gotham FC (C)	22	8	7	7	25	24	+1	31	Playoff quarterfinals
7	Orlando Pride	22	10	1	11	27	28	−1	31	
8	Washington Spirit	22	7	9	6	26	29	−3	30	
9	Racing Louisville FC	22	6	9	7	25	24	+1	27	
10	Houston Dash	22	6	8	8	16	18	−2	26	
11	Kansas City Current	22	8	2	12	30	36	−6	26	
12	Chicago Red Stars	22	7	3	12	28	50	−22	24	

Source: NWSL
Rules for classification: Tiebreakers
(C) Champions and W Champions Cup; (S) NWSL Shield

==== Results summary ====
Overall								Home						Away					
Pld	W	D	L	GF	GA	GD	Pts	W	D	L	GF	GA	GD	W	D	L	GF	GA	GD
22	10	5	7	42	32	+10	35	7	2	2	23	10	+13	3	3	5	19	22	−3

Last updated: October 15, 2023.
Source: NWSLsoccer.com

==== Results by matchday ====
Matchday	1	2	3	4	5	6	7	8	9	10	11	12	13	14	15	16	17	18	19	20	21	22
Stadium	H	A	H	H	H	A	A	H	A	A	A	A	H	H	A	H	A	A	H	H	H	A
Result	W	W	D	W	D	D	L	W	D	W	L	W	W	L	L	W	D	L	W	L	W	L
Position	1	1	1	1	1	2	4	2	2	1	3	2	1	2	2	1	1	2	1	2	1	2

Updated to match(es) played on October 15, 2023. Source: NWSL
A = Away; H = Home; W = Win; D = Draw; L = Loss

=== Playoffs ===
November 5, 2023 Semi-finals	Portland Thorns FC	0–1 (a.e.t.)	NJ/NY Gotham FC	Portland, Oregon
4:00 p.m. PST	Sugita (yellow card) 81'	Report	Martin (yellow card) 40'; Nighswonger (yellow card) 70'; López (yellow card) 90+3'; Krieger (yellow card) 96'; Stengel 107'	Stadium: Providence Park; Attendance: 25,218; Referee: Danielle Chesky

== Statistics ==
As of matches played July 21, 2023.

Goalscorers per competition
No.	Pos.	Nat.	Name	NWSL	Cup	Playoffs	Total
9	FW	(United States) USA	Sophia Smith	10	0	0	10
22	FW	(United States) USA	Morgan Weaver	4	2	0	6
19	MF	(United States) USA	Crystal Dunn	5	0	0	5
33	FW	(United States) USA	Hannah Betfort	1	2	0	3
12	FW	(Canada) CAN	Christine Sinclair	3	0	0	3
8	MF	(Japan) JPN	Hina Sugita	3	0	0	3
13	MF	(United States) USA	Olivia Moultrie	2	0	0	2
2	DF	(Mexico) MEX	Reyna Reyes	1	1	0	2
15	FW	(United States) USA	Michele Vasconcelos	1	1	0	2
1	GK	(United States) USA	Bella Bixby	1	0	0	1
24	FW	(United States) USA	Izzy D'Aquila	0	1	0	1
20	DF	(United States) USA	Kelli Hubly	1	0	0	1
14	DF	(Finland) FIN	Natalia Kuikka	1	0	0	1
11	MF	(Costa Rica) CRC	Raquel Rodríguez	1	0	0	1
Total				30	7	0	37

Assists credited by player, per competition
No.	Pos.	Nat.	Name	NWSL	Cup	Playoffs	Total
17	MF	(United States) USA	Sam Coffey	6	0	0	6
25	DF	(United States) USA	Meghan Klingenberg	3	2	0	5
15	FW	(United States) USA	Sophia Smith	5	0	0	5
13	MF	(United States) USA	Olivia Moultrie	2	1	0	3
8	MF	(Japan) JPN	Hina Sugita	3	0	0	3
22	FW	(United States) USA	Morgan Weaver	3	0	0	3
19	MF	(United States) USA	Crystal Dunn	2	0	0	2
14	DF	(Finland) FIN	Natalia Kuikka	2	0	0	2
12	FW	(Canada) CAN	Christine Sinclair	1	1	0	2
33	FW	(United States) USA	Hannah Betfort	0	1	0	1
24	FW	(United States) USA	Izzy D'Aquila	0	1	0	1
Total				27	6	0	33

Clean sheets per competition
No.	Pos.	Ntn.	Name	NWSL	Cup	Playoffs	Total
1	GK	(United States) USA	Bella Bixby	4	0	0	4
Total				4	0	0	4

Disciplinary cards per competition
Player				NWSL		Cup		Playoffs		Total	
No.	Pos.	Nat.	Name	Yellow card	Red card	Yellow card	Red card	Yellow card	Red card	Yellow card	Red card
20	DF	(United States) USA	Kelli Hubly	4	0	0	0	0	0	4	0
14	DF	(Finland) FIN	Natalia Kuikka	3	0	0	0	0	0	3	0
39	DF	(United States) USA	Meaghan Nally	1	0	2	0	0	0	3	0
1	GK	(United States) USA	Bella Bixby	2	0	0	0	0	0	2	0
9	FW	(United States) USA	Sophia Smith	2	0	0	0	0	0	2	0
8	MF	(Japan) JPN	Hina Sugita	2	0	0	0	0	0	2	0
17	MF	(United States) USA	Sam Coffey	1	0	0	0	0	0	1	0
25	DF	(United States) USA	Meghan Klingenberg	1	0	0	0	0	0	1	0
46	MF	(United States) USA	Taylor Porter	0	0	1	0	0	0	1	0
15	FW	(United States) USA	Michele Vasconcelos	0	0	1	0	0	0	1	0
22	FW	(United States) USA	Morgan Weaver	1	0	0	0	0	0	1	0
Total				17	0	4	0	0	0	21	0

== Awards ==
As of July 5, 2023.

=== NWSL monthly awards ===
Thorns FC players named to the Best XI of the Month
Month	Pos.	Nat.	Name	Ref.
March/April	DF	(United States) USA	Becky Sauerbrunn	
March/April	MF	(United States) USA	Crystal Dunn	
March/April	FW	(United States) USA	Sophia Smith	
May	MF	(United States) USA	Crystal Dunn (2)	
June	MF	(United States) USA	Sam Coffey	
June	FW	(United States) USA	Sophia Smith (2)	

Thorns FC players named NWSL Player of the Month
Month	Player of the Month			Statline	Ref.
Month	Pos.	Nat.	Name	Statline	Ref.
March/April	FW	(United States) USA	Sophia Smith	Hat-trick vs. KC; 4 goals, 4 assists	
June	FW	(United States) USA	Sophia Smith (2)	Hat-trick vs. WAS; 6 goals	

=== NWSL weekly awards ===
Thorns FC players named NWSL Player of the Week
Wk.	Player of the Week				Ref.
Wk.	Pos.	Nat.	Name	Won	Ref.
1	FW	(United States) USA	Sophia Smith	Nom.	
2	FW	(United States) USA	Sophia Smith	Won	
6	MF	(United States) USA	Crystal Dunn	Won	
8	MF	(United States) USA	Sam Coffey	Nom.	
10	FW	(United States) USA	Morgan Weaver	2nd	
13	FW	(United States) USA	Sophia Smith (2)	Won	

Thorns FC players awarded NWSL Save of the Week
Wk.	Save of the Week				Ref.
Wk.	Pos.	Nat.	Name	Won	Ref.
4	GK	(United States) USA	Bella Bixby	Nom.	
6	GK	(United States) USA	Bella Bixby	Nom.	
9	GK	(United States) USA	Bella Bixby	Nom.	
10	GK	(United States) USA	Bella Bixby	Nom.	
13	GK	(United States) USA	Shelby Hogan	Nom.	

== Transactions ==
=== 2023 NWSL Draft ===
Draft picks are not automatically signed to the team roster. The 2023 NWSL Draft was held on January 12, 2023, in Philadelphia, Pennsylvania.

R	P	Pos.	Nat.	Player	College	Status	Ref.
1	5	DF	(Mexico) MEX	Reyna Reyes	University of Alabama	Signed through 2024 with an option for 2025 on March 25, 2023.	
1	12	FW	(United States) USA	Izzy D'Aquila	Santa Clara University	Signed through 2025 with an option for 2026 on March 15, 2023.	
2	24	FW	(United States) USA	Lauren DeBeau	Michigan State University	Not signed, rights released.	
3	32	GK	(United States) USA	Lauren Kozal	Michigan State University	Signed through 2023 with an option for 2024 on March 15, 2023.	

=== Contract options ===
Date	Pos.	Nat.	Player	Notes	Ref.
November 1, 2022	FW	(Canada) CAN	Christine Sinclair	Option exercised.	
November 15, 2022	DF	(United States) USA	Natalie Beckman	Option exercised.	
November 15, 2022	MF	(United States) USA	Taylor Porter	Option exercised.	
November 15, 2022	MF	(United States) USA	Gabby Provenzano	Option exercised.	
November 15, 2022	FW	(United States) USA	Marissa Everett	Option declined; player retired.	

=== Re-signings ===
Date	Pos.	Nat.	Player	Notes	Ref.
September 30, 2022	DF	(United States) USA	Becky Sauerbrunn	Free agent re-signed through 2023.	
November 8, 2022	MF	(Costa Rica) CRC	Raquel Rodríguez	Re-signed through 2025.	
November 10, 2022	MF	(United States) USA	Sam Coffey	Signed a contract extension through 2025.	
November 15, 2022	MF	(United States) USA	Morgan Weaver	Signed a contract extension through 2024 with an option for 2025.	
January 27, 2023	DF	(United States) USA	Tegan McGrady	Re-signed through 2023 with an option for 2024.	
January 27, 2023	FW	(United States) USA	Michele Vasconcelos	Free agent re-signed through 2023 with an option for 2024.	
January 27, 2023	FW	(United States) USA	Hannah Betfort	Re-signed through 2024 with an option for 2025.	
January 27, 2023	DF	(United States) USA	Meaghan Nally	Re-signed through 2024 with an option for 2025.	
January 27, 2023	GK	(United States) USA	Shelby Hogan	Re-signed through 2025 with an option for 2026.	

=== Loans in ===
Date	Pos.	Nat.	Player	Previous club	Fee/notes	Ref.
April 13, 2023	FW	(Canada) CAN	Adriana Leon	(England) Manchester United	Signed for a short-term loan through June 30, 2023.	
July 20, 2023	FW	(United States) USA	Alyssa Walker	(Norway) SK Brann Kvinner	Signed for a short-term loan with fee until September 1, 2023.	

=== Loans out ===
Date	Pos.	Nat.	Player	Destination club	Fee/notes	Ref.
June 30, 2023	MF	(United States) USA	Lindsey Horan	(France) Olympique Lyonnais Féminin	Loaned until June 30, 2023.	

=== Transfers in ===
Date	Pos.	Nat.	Player	Previous club	Fee/notes	Ref.
June 29, 2023	DF	(United States) USA	Kayla Morrison	(Australia) Melbourne Victory FC	Signed to a short-term National Team Replacement Player contract.	
July 6, 2023	MF	(Colombia) COL	Isabel Dehakiz	(Colombia) Deportivo Cali	Signed to a short-term National Team Replacement Player contract.	
July 20, 2023	GK	(United States) USA	Lindsey Harris	(Portugal) S.F. Damaiense	Signed to a short-term Goalkeeper Replacement contract due to a knee injury to Lauren Kozal.	
September 20, 2023	DF	(Denmark) DEN	Rikke Sevecke	(England) Everton	Signed for remainder of 2023 with a team option for the 2024 season.	

=== Transfers out ===
Date	Pos.	Nat.	Player	Destination club	Fee/notes	Ref.
November 28, 2022	GK	(United States) USA	Abby Smith	(United States) NJ/NY Gotham FC	Unrestricted free agent signing.	
January 5, 2023	MF	(United States) USA	Yazmeen Ryan	(United States) NJ/NY Gotham FC (Note: Rights acquired via Angel City FC.)	Traded to Angel City FC in exchange for the fifth-overall pick in the 2023 NWSL Draft, a second-round pick in the 2024 NWSL Draft, and $200,000 in allocation money. As part of the transaction, Ryan was traded by Angel City to Gotham FC with $250,000 in allocation money in exchange for the first-overall pick in the 2023 NWSL Draft.	
June 22, 2023	MF	(United States) USA	Lindsey Horan	(France) Olympique Lyon	Transferred for a transfer fee of €250,000 with a conditional €50,000 bonus.	

=== Retirements ===
Date	Pos.	Nat.	Player	Ref.
November 28, 2022	FW	(United States) USA	Marissa Everett	
