= 2024 Portland Thorns FC season =

Portland Thorns FC
2024 season
- Owner: RAJ Sports
- General manager: Karina LeBlanc
- Head coach: Rob Gale (interim Apr 16–Jul 19, permanent Jul 19–); Mike Norris (until Apr 16)
- Stadium: Providence Park; (capacity: 25,218)
- League: 6th
- NWSL x Liga MX Femenil Summer Cup: Group stage
- Playoffs: Quarterfinals
- CONCACAF W Champions Cup: Semifinals
- Top goalscorer: Sophia Smith (12)
- Highest home attendance: 23,212 (Nov 1 vs. LA)
- Lowest home attendance: 16,688 (Mar 30 vs. LOU)
- Average home league attendance: 18,725
- Biggest win: League: 4–0 (May 11 vs. SEA); All competitions: 0–6 (Oct 15 at VAN, CONCACAF)
- Biggest defeat: 1–4 (Jun 23 vs. KC)
Home colors	Away colors
- All statistics correct as of November 10, 2024.

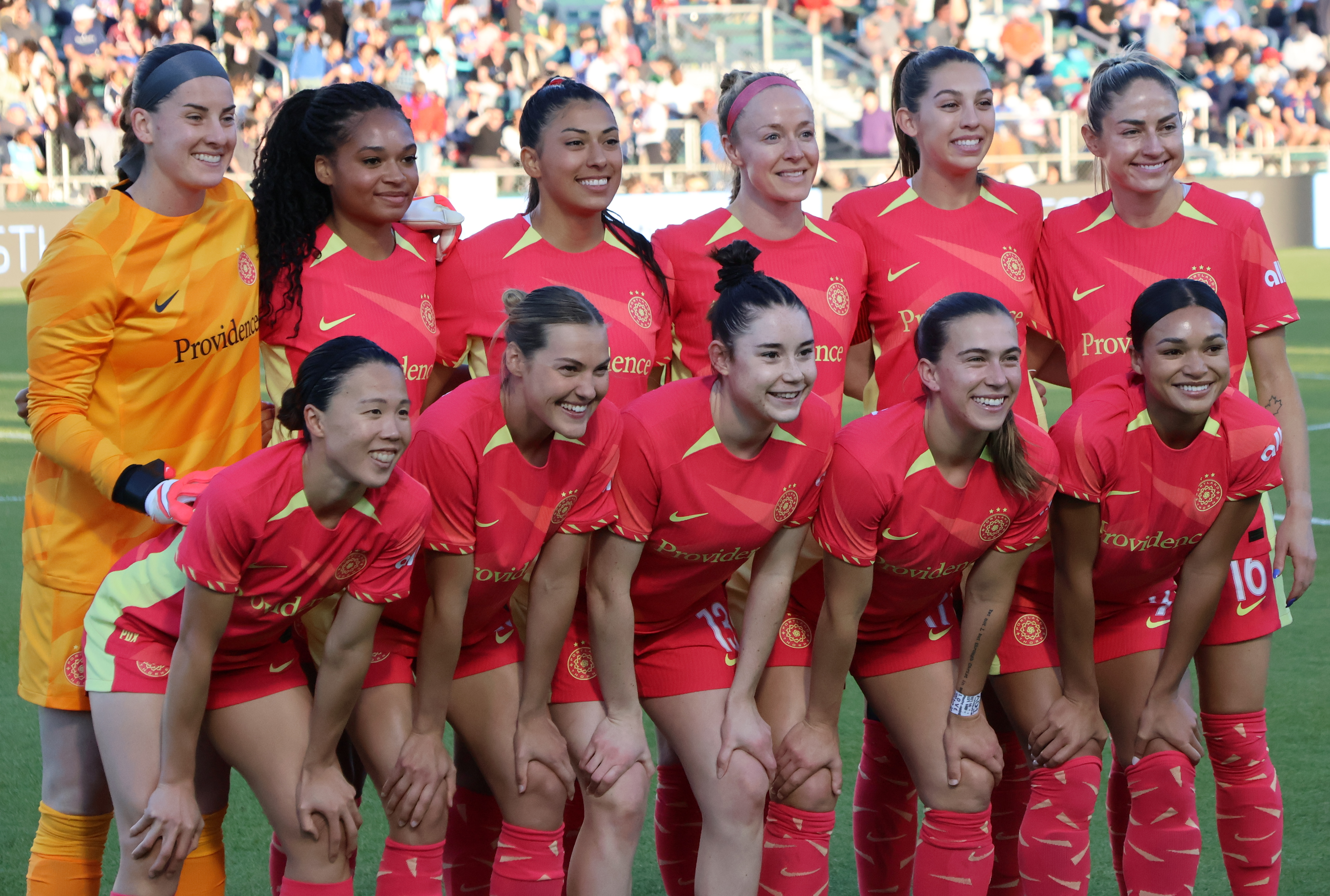
Week 4 starting lineup: Hogan, Obaze, Reyes, Sauerbrunn, Weaver, Beckie Sugita, Müller, Moultrie, Coffey, Smith

The 2024 Portland Thorns FC season was the team's twelfth season as a professional women's soccer team. Thorns FC played in the National Women's Soccer League (NWSL), the top tier of women's soccer in the United States. The Thorns opened the NWSL season against the Kansas City Current, playing in the first game at the Current's newly built CPKC Stadium, and finished in sixth place to qualify for the playoffs, where they lost in the quarterfinals to third-seeded NJ/NY Gotham FC.

In addition to playing in the 2024 NWSL season, the Thorns also played in the inaugural 2024 NWSL x Liga MX Femenil Summer Cup and 2024–25 CONCACAF W Champions Cup tournaments, qualifying for the latter by finishing as runners-up for the 2023 NWSL Shield.

== Team ==
=== Staff ===
As of October 4, 2024.

Technical
General manager President of Thorns FC operations	Karina LeBlanc
Technical director	Mike Norris
Head coach	Rob Gale
Assistant coach	Vytautas Andriuškevičius
Assistant coach	Sarah Lowdon
Assistant coach	Stephen Hart
Goalkeeper coach	Jordan Franken
Medical
Head athletic trainer	Matt Hunter
Director of scouting and recruiting Youth sporting director	Mike Smith
Sports scientist	Ella Maliska
Performance and wellness coach	Renee Pirkl

=== Squad ===
As of November 2, 2024.

No.	Pos.	Nat.	Name
1	GK	(United States) USA	Bella Bixby
18	GK	(United States) USA	Shelby Hogan
26	GK	(United States) USA	Kat Asman
30	GK	(Australia) AUS	Mackenzie Arnold
2	DF	(Mexico) MEX	Reyna Reyes
4	DF	(United States) USA	Becky Sauerbrunn
5	DF	(Denmark) DEN	Isabella Obaze
11	DF	(Nigeria) NGA	Nicole Payne
20	DF	(United States) USA	Kelli Hubly
25	DF	(United States) USA	Meghan Klingenberg
8	MF	(Japan) JPN	Hina Sugita
13	MF	(United States) USA	Olivia Moultrie
14	MF	(United States) USA	Sophie Hirst
17	MF	(United States) USA	Sam Coffey
21	MF	(Canada) CAN	Jessie Fleming
23	MF	(Germany) GER	Marie Müller
27	MF	(Republic of Ireland) IRL	Marissa Sheva
29	MF	(United States) USA	Mallie McKenzie
44	MF	(United States) USA	Gabby Provenzano
54	MF	(United States) USA	Olivia Wade-Katoa
9	FW	(United States) USA	Sophia Smith
12	FW	(Canada) CAN	Christine Sinclair
15	FW	(United States) USA	Payton Linnehan
22	FW	(United States) USA	Morgan Weaver
24	FW	(United States) USA	Izzy D'Aquila
66	FW	(United States) USA	Reilyn Turner
77	FW	(United States) USA	Alexa Spaanstra

=== On loan ===
No.	Pos.	Nat.	Name	Destination
28	GK	(United States) USA	Lauren Kozal	Tampa Bay Sun FC

== Competitions ==
Win Draw Loss

=== Regular season ===
Pos	Team	Pld	W	D	L	GF	GA	GD	Pts	Qualification
4	Kansas City Current	26	16	7	3	57	31	+26	55	Playoffs
5	North Carolina Courage	26	12	3	11	34	28	+6	39	Playoffs
6	Portland Thorns FC	26	10	4	12	37	35	+2	34	Playoffs
7	Bay FC	26	11	1	14	31	41	−10	34	Playoffs
8	Chicago Red Stars	26	10	2	14	31	38	−7	32	Playoffs

Source: NWSL
Rules for classification: Tiebreakers

==== Results summary ====
Overall								Home						Away					
Pld	W	D	L	GF	GA	GD	Pts	W	D	L	GF	GA	GD	W	D	L	GF	GA	GD
26	10	4	12	37	35	+2	34	7	1	5	22	15	+7	3	3	7	15	20	−5

Last updated: November 2, 2024.
Source: NWSLsoccer.com

March 16 1	Kansas City Current	5–4	Portland Thorns FC	Kansas City, Missouri
12:00 pm CT	DiBernardo 22'; Wheeler 25'; Bia 34'; Hamilton 64'; Pfeiffer 68'	Report	Smith 43', 74'; Beckie 71', 90+1'; Sugita (yellow card) 79'; Hubly (yellow card) 85'	Stadium: CPKC Stadium; Attendance: 11,500*; Referee: Alex Billeter

March 24 2	Portland Thorns FC	0–1	NJ/NY Gotham FC	Portland, Oregon
4:00 pm PT		Report	González 72'	Stadium: Providence Park; Attendance: 19,857; Referee: Ricardo Fierro

March 30 3	Portland Thorns FC	2–2	Racing Louisville FC	Portland, Oregon
4:30 pm PT	Fleming (yellow card) 24'; Weaver 52'; Coffey 90+9'	Report	Kanu 3', 6'	Stadium: Providence Park; Attendance: 16,688; Referee: Gerald Flores

April 13 4	North Carolina Courage	2–0	Portland Thorns FC	Cary, North Carolina
8:00 pm ET	Lussi 5'; Hopkins 35'	Report	Sugita (yellow card) 71'; Hubly (yellow card) 81'	Stadium: WakeMed Soccer Park; Attendance: 5,711; Referee: Matthew Thompson

April 20 5	Portland Thorns FC	4–1	Houston Dash	Portland, Oregon
3:00 pm PT	Sinclair 6', (yellow card) 20'; Smith 27'; Moultrie 77'; Beckie 90+6'	Report	Ordoñez 49', (yellow card) 75'; Rubensson (yellow card) 69'	Stadium: Providence Park; Attendance: 17,580; Referee: Danielle Chesky

April 27 6	Chicago Red Stars	0–2	Portland Thorns FC	Bridgeview, Illinois
6:00 pm CT	Staab (yellow card) 62'	Report	Smith 10', 26', (yellow card) 71'; Obaze (yellow card) 90+8'	Stadium: SeatGeek Stadium; Attendance: 4,544; Referee: Thomas Snyder

May 1 7	Bay FC	2–3	Portland Thorns FC	San Jose, California
7:00 pm PT	Kundananji 41'; Castellanos 60'	Report	Linnehan 2', (yellow card) 45+6'; Smith 7', 78'; Dias (yellow card) 90+1'	Stadium: PayPal Park; Attendance: 10,611; Referee: Greg Dopka

May 4 8	Portland Thorns FC	2–1	Washington Spirit	Portland, Oregon
7:00 pm PT	Coffeyy 4'; Sinclair 22'	Report	Silano 86'; Rodman (yellow card) 90+8'	Stadium: Providence Park; Attendance: 17,039; Referee: Elvis Osmanovic

May 11 9	Portland Thorns FC	4–0	Seattle Reign FC	Portland, Oregon
7:00 pm PT	Moultrie 42' (yellow card) 61'; Smith 80' (pen.); Sugita 90+3'; Linnehan 90+8'	Report	McClernon (yellow card) 58'; Huerta (yellow card) 79'; Athens (yellow card) 89'	Stadium: Providence Park; Attendance: 20,229; Referee: Abdou Ndiaye

May 17 10	Houston Dash	0–2	Portland Thorns FC	Houston, Texas
6:00 pm CT	Petersen (yellow card) 42'	Report	Dias 56'; Moultrie 68'	Stadium: Shell Energy Stadium; Attendance: 5,726; Referee: Rebecca Pagan

May 24 11	Orlando Pride	2–1	Portland Thorns FC	Orlando, Florida
7:00 pm ET	Banda 30', 40'; Lemos (yellow card) 90'	Report	Hubly (yellow card) 9'; D'Aquila 71'; Linnehan (yellow card) 90+6'	Stadium: Inter&Co Stadium; Attendance: 9,226; Referee: Katja Koroleva

June 8 12	Portland Thorns FC	1–0	North Carolina Courage	Portland, Oregon
7:00 pm PT	Smith 79' (pen.), (yellow card) 89' (yellow-red card) 90+11'	Report	O'Sullivan (yellow card) 66'; Williams (yellow card) 26' (yellow-red card) 78'; Miura (yellow card) 102+11'	Stadium: Providence Park; Attendance: 21,025; Referee: Danielle Chesky

June 16 13	Seattle Reign FC	0–0	Portland Thorns FC	Seattle
1:00 pm PT	Brown (yellow card) 53'; Huitema (yellow card) 89'	Report	Beckie (yellow card) 3'; Dias (yellow card) 67'; Müller (yellow card) 85'	Stadium: Lumen Field; Attendance: 9,052; Referee: Alyssa Nichols

June 23 14	Portland Thorns FC	1–4	Kansas City Current	Portland, Oregon
1:00 pm PT	Hubly (yellow card) 62'; Smith 73'	Report	LaBonta 30', 40'; Ballisager 38'; Chawinga 47'	Stadium: Providence Park; Attendance: 20,024; Referee: Brandon Stevis

June 29 15	Utah Royals	0–0	Portland Thorns FC	Sandy, Utah
8:00 pm MT	Del Fava (yellow card) 44'	Report	Hubly (yellow card) 90'	Stadium: America First Field; Attendance: 8,677; Referee: Sergil Demlanchuk

July 5 16	Portland Thorns FC	1–0	San Diego Wave FC	Portland, Oregon
7:00 pm PT	D'Aquila 85'; Dias (yellow card) 90'	Report	Lundkvist (yellow card) 22'; van Egmond (yellow card) 74'	Stadium: Providence Park; Attendance: 18,011; Referee: Alex Billeter

August 24 17	NJ/NY Gotham FC	2–0	Portland Thorns FC	Harrison, New Jersey
2:00 pm ET	Stevens 7'; Ryan 70'	Report		Stadium: Red Bull Arena; Attendance: 10,640; Referee: Darren Bandy

August 30 18	Portland Thorns FC	1–3	Bay FC	Portland, Oregon
7:00 pm PT	Smith 32'; Fleming (yellow card) 83'	Report	Dahlkemper 7'; Hill 18'; Bailey (yellow card) 35'; Anderson 70'; Kundananji (yellow card) 73'	Stadium: Providence Park; Attendance: 18,018; Referee: Shawn Tehini

September 7 19	Washington Spirit	2–1	Portland Thorns FC	Washington D.C.
9:30 am PT	Rodman 59'; Santos 90+6'	Report	Sugita 48'	Stadium: Audi Field; Attendance: 14,306; Referee: Greg Dopka

September 13 20	Portland Thorns FC	0–1	Chicago Red Stars	Portland, Oregon
7:00 pm PT	Reyes (yellow card) 46'; Hubly (yellow card) 79'	Report; Box	Schlegel 16'	Stadium: Providence Park; Attendance: 17,120; Referee: Elton García

September 23 21	Angel City FC	2–2	Portland Thorns FC	Los Angeles, California
7:00 pm PT	A. Thompson 10' (Dougherty Howard); Emslie 76'	Report	Weaver 49' (Müller); Fleming (yellow card) 59'; Moultrie 64' (Hubly)	Stadium: BMO Stadium; Attendance: 22,000; Referee: Joshua Encarnación

September 28 22	San Diego Wave FC	2–0	Portland Thorns FC	San Diego, California
7:00 pm PT	Jones 69'; Barcenas 74'	Report		Stadium: Snapdragon Stadium; Referee: Elijio Arreguin

October 5 23	Portland Thorns FC	1–2	Utah Royals	Portland, Oregon
4:00 pm PT	Moultrie 53' (pen.)	Report	Betfort 47'; Tanaka 50'	Stadium: Providence Park; Attendance: 17,451; Referee: Rebecca Pagan

October 11 24	Portland Thorns FC	2–0	Orlando Pride	Portland, Oregon
7:00 pm PT	Weaver 22'; Sinclair 54'; Reyes (yellow card) 81'; Müller (yellow card) 84'	Report; Box	Pickett (yellow card) 21'	Stadium: Providence Park; Attendance: 17,174; Referee: JC Griggs

October 19 25	Racing Louisville FC	1–0	Portland Thorns FC	Louisville, Kentucky
7:30 PM ET	Flint (yellow card) 60' (goal) 88'	Report	Moultrie (yellow card) 79'	Stadium: Lynn Family Stadium; Attendance: 5,905; Referee: Calin Radosav

November 1 26	Portland Thorns FC	3–0	Angel City FC	Portland, Oregon
7:00 pm PT	Sinclair 16'; Smith 26'; Weaver 45+4'	Report	Bright (yellow card) 73'	Stadium: Providence Park; Attendance: 23,212; Referee: Brad Jensen

=== Playoffs ===
The Thorns finished the regular season in sixth place and qualified for the NWSL playoffs as the sixth seed of eight teams.

November 10, 2024 Quarterfinals	NJ/NY Gotham FC	2–1	Portland Thorns FC	Harrison, New Jersey
3:00 p.m. EST (UTC-7)	Davidson 67'; Carter (yellow card) 74'; Lavelle 90+7'	Report	Turner 75'	Stadium: Red Bull Arena; Attendance: 15,540; Referee: Danielle Chesky

=== NWSL x Liga MX Femenil Summer Cup ===
Advancement in the tournament was achieved by the four teams with the most points across the five groups. This did not include any teams in this group.

Pos	Team	Pld	W	PW	PL	L	GF	GA	GD	Pts	UTA	POR	SEA	TIJ
1	(United States Soccer Federation) Utah Royals	3	2	0	0	1	9	4	+5	6	—	3–1	1–2	5–1
2	(United States Soccer Federation) Portland Thorns FC	3	2	0	0	1	7	3	+4	6	1–3	—	1–0	5–0
3	(United States Soccer Federation) Seattle Reign FC	3	1	0	0	2	4	5	−1	3	2–1	0–1	—	2–3
4	(Mexican Football Federation) Tijuana	3	1	0	0	2	4	12	−8	3	1–5	0–5	3–2	—

Source: NWSL
Rules for classification: tiebreakers

July 21, 2024	Portland Thorns FC (United States)	5–0	(Mexico) Tijuana	Portland, United States
7:00 pm	Sinclair 4'; Wade-Katoa 18'; D'Aquila 54'; Dias 67'; Sheva 72'	Report		Stadium: Providence Park; Referee: Osvaldo Delgado-Landeros

July 27, 2024	Utah Royals (United States)	3–1	(United States) Portland Thorns FC	Sandy
10:00 p.m.	Betfort 3'; Sentnor 21'; Vasconcelos 76'	Report	Moultrie 86'	Stadium: America First Field; Referee: Jamie Padilla

July 31, 2024	Portland Thorns FC (United States)	1–0	(United States) Seattle Reign FC	Portland, United States
10:00 p.m.	Linnehan 40'	Report		Stadium: Providence Park; Referee: Corbyn May

=== 2024–25 CONCACAF W Champions Cup ===
The Thorns advanced to the Concacaf W Champions Cup semifinals but lost to hosts Liga MX Femenil club Tigres 0-2 on May 21, 2025. They defeated Club América 3-0 in the third-place consolation match on May 24.

==== Group stage ====
Pos	Team	Pld	W	D	L	GF	GA	GD	Pts	Qualification	AME	POR	SDW	WFC	SFE
1	(Mexico) América	4	3	0	1	14	3	+11	9	Advance to knockout stage	—	—	—	7–0	5–0
2	(United States) Portland Thorns	4	3	0	1	13	5	+8	9	Advance to knockout stage	3–1	—	—	—	2–1
3	(United States) San Diego Wave	4	3	0	1	7	3	+4	9		0–1	3–2	—	—	—
4	(Canada) Whitecaps Girls Elite	4	1	0	3	2	16	−14	3		—	0–6	0–2	—	—
5	(Panama) Santa Fe	4	0	0	4	2	11	−9	0		—	—	0–2	1–2	—

Source: CONCACAF
Rules for classification: Tiebreakers

4 September 2024	Portland Thorns FC (United States)	3–1	(Mexico) Club América Femenil	Providence Park, Portland
19:00	Sinclair 13', 28'; Moultrie (yellow card) 45'; Turner 52'	Report	Guerrero 53'	Referee: Myriam Marcotte (Canada)

18 September 2024	San Diego Wave FC (United States)	3–2	(United States) Portland Thorns FC	Snapdragon Stadium, San Diego
19:00

1 October 2024	Portland Thorns FC (United States)	2–1	(Panama) Santa Fé FC	Providence Park, Portland
19:30

15 October 2024	Whitecaps FC Girls Elite (Canada)	0–6	(United States) Portland Thorns FC	BC Place, Vancouver
TBD

==== Semifinals ====
21 May 2025	UANL (Mexico)	2–0	(United States) Portland Thorns FC	Estadio Universitario, San Nicolás de los Garza (Mexico)
21:30 ET	Farmer 10'; Kgatlana 27' (yellow card) 45'; Rangel (yellow card) 85'	Box score Report	Perry (yellow card) 90+7'	Attendance: 4,589; Referee: Carly Shaw-MacLaren (Canada)

==== Third place play-off ====
24 May 2025	(Mexico) Club América Femenil	0–3	(United States) Portland Thorns FC	Estadio Universitario, San Nicolás de los Garza (Mexico)
19:00 ET	Guerrero (yellow card) 48'	Box score Report	Tordin 45'; Linnehan 52'; Messner (yellow card) 57'; Moultrie 81'	Attendance: 803; Referee: Astrid Gramajo (Guatemala)

== Transactions ==
=== 2024 NWSL Draft ===
Draft picks are not automatically signed to the team roster. The 2024 NWSL Draft was held on January 12, 2024.

R	P	Player	Pos.	College	Status	Ref.
1	11	(United States) Payton Linnehan	FW	Pennsylvania State University	Signed to a two-year contract with a mutual option on March 1, 2024.	
2	23	(United States) Olivia Wade-Katoa	MF	Brigham Young University	Signed to a two-year contract with a mutual option on March 5, 2024.	
2	25	(United States) Kelsey Kaufusi	DF	Utah State University	Not signed.	
3	39	(United States) Kat Asman	GK	Pennsylvania State University	Signed to a one-year contract with a mutual option on March 6, 2024.	
4	53	(United States) Katie Duong	MF	Stanford University	Not signed.	

=== Contract operations ===
Date	Player	Pos.	Notes	Ref.
January 17, 2024	(United States) Gabby Provenzano	MF	Re-signed to a one-year contract extension.	
January 18, 2024	(United States) Meghan Klingenberg	DF	Free agent re-signed to a one-year contract.	
January 22, 2024	(Canada) Christine Sinclair	FW	Free agent re-signed to a one-year contract.	
January 23, 2024	(United States) Becky Sauerbrunn	DF	Free agent re-signed to a one-year contract.	
February 13, 2024	(United States) Olivia Moultrie	MF	Re-signed to a three-year contract extension through 2026.	
September 12, 2024	(United States) Morgan Weaver	FW	Re-signed to a five-year contract extension through 2028.	

=== Loans in ===
Date	Player	Pos.	Previous club	Fee/notes	Ref.
February 18, 2024	(Nigeria) Nicole Payne	DF	(France) Paris Saint-Germain	Loaned through the end of the season. Permanently acquired on July 2, 2024.	

=== Loans out ===
Date	Player	Pos.	Destination club	Fee/notes	Ref.
September 5, 2024	(United States) Lauren Kozal	GK	(United States) Tampa Bay Sun FC	Loaned through the remainder of the NWSL season.	

=== Transfers in ===
Date	Player	Pos.	Previous club	Fee/notes	Ref.
January 9, 2024	(Denmark) Isabella Obaze	DF	(Sweden) FC Rosengård	Acquired in exchange for an undisclosed fee and signed to a three-year contract with a mutual option.	
January 31, 2024	(Canada) Jessie Fleming	MF	(England) Chelsea	Acquired in exchange for an undisclosed fee and signed to a three-year contract.	
February 2, 2024	(Germany) Marie Müller	DF	(Germany) SC Freiburg	Acquired in exchange for an undisclosed fee and signed to a two-year contract with a mutual option.	
March 14, 2024	(Republic of Ireland) Marissa Sheva	MF	(United States) Washington Spirit	Preseason trialist signed to a one-year contract with a mutual option.	
March 20, 2024	(Portugal) Ana Dias	FW	(Russia) ZFK Zenit	Signed to a one-year contract with a mutual option.	
March 21, 2024	(United States) Mallie McKenzie	MF	(United States) Georgia Bulldogs	Preseason trialist signed to a one-year contract with a mutual option.	
April 20, 2024	(Mexico) Emily Alvarado	GK	(United States) Houston Dash	Traded in exchange for $35,000 in allocation money and a maximum of $50,000 in additional funding pending performance conditions met.	
July 2, 2024	(Nigeria) Nicole Payne	DF	(France) Paris Saint-Germain	Loanee acquired permanently in exchange for an undisclosed fee and signed to a two-year contract through 2025.	
July 10, 2024	(Australia) Mackenzie Arnold	GK	(England) West Ham United	Signed to a three-year contract through 2026 with a mutual option.	
July 18, 2024	(United States) Marissa DiGenova	DF	(United States) Lancaster Inferno FC	Signed as national team replacement players.	
July 18, 2024	(United States) Rebekah Valdez	FW	(United States) Grand Canyon Antelopes	Signed as national team replacement players.	
August 19, 2024	(United States) Alexa Spaanstra	FW	(United States) Kansas City Current	Traded in exchange for $25,000 in intra-league transfer funds and $15,000 in allocation money.	
August 21, 2024	(United States) Reilyn Turner	FW	(United States) Racing Louisville FC	Traded in exchange for Janine Beckie.	
September 2, 2024	(United States) Sophie Hirst	MF	(United States) Houston Dash	Traded in exchange for $25,000 in intra-league transfer funds and a conditional $10,000 in intra-league transfer funds.	

=== Transfers out ===
Date	Player	Pos.	Destination club	Fee/notes	Ref.
January 23, 2024	(Costa Rica) Rocky Rodríguez	MF	(United States) Angel City FC	Traded in exchange for $275,000 in allocation money and conditional fees.	
July 26, 2024	(United States) Meaghan Nally	DF	(Denmark) Odense Boldklub Q	Mutual contract termination.	
August 15, 2024	(Mexico) Emily Alvarado	GK	(Mexico) Club Tijuana	Mutual contract termination.	
August 21, 2024	(Canada) Janine Beckie	FW	(United States) Racing Louisville FC	Traded in exchange for Reilyn Turner.	
August 26, 2024	(Portugal) Ana Dias	FW	(Mexico) Tigres UANL	Transferred in exchange for an undisclosed fee.	

=== Retirements ===
Date	Player	Pos.	Ref.
November 10, 2024	(Canada) Christine Sinclair	FW	

=== Injury listings ===
Date	Player	Pos.	List	Injury	Ref.
March 13, 2024	(United States) Gabby Provenzano	MF	Season-ending injury	Left Achilles tear.	
May 9, 2024	(United States) Morgan Weaver	FW	45-day injury	Right knee injury sustained in match against Bay FC.	
October 11, 2024	(United States) Olivia Wade-Katoa	MF	Season-ending injury	Right knee injury sustained in match against Santa Fe F.C.	

=== Preseason trialists ===
Trialists are non-rostered invitees during preseason and are not automatically signed. The Thorns' initial preseason roster, which was released on January 24, 2024, did not feature any non-rostered invitees. However, the club added three non-rostered invitees to their preseason roster on February 20, 2024.

Player	Pos.	Previous club	Status	Ref.
(United States) Taylor Aylmer	MF	(United States) Racing Louisville FC	Not signed.	
(United States) Mallie McKenzie	MF	(United States) Georgia Bulldogs	Signed to a one-year contract with a mutual option on March 21, 2024.	
(Republic of Ireland) Marissa Sheva	FW	(United States) Washington Spirit	Signed to a one-year contract with a mutual option on March 14, 2024.	
