= 2023 NWSL Challenge Cup =

Fourth edition of top women's soccer league cup in the United States

2023 UKG National Women's Soccer League Challenge Cup

Tournament details
- Country: United States
- Dates: April 19 – September 9
- Teams: 12

Final positions
- Champions: North Carolina Courage (2nd title)
- Runners-up: Racing Louisville FC

Tournament statistics
- Matches played: 39
- Goals scored: 101 (2.59 per match)
- Top goal scorer(s): Kristen Hamilton (5 goals)

Awards
- MVP: Kristen Hamilton
- All statistics correct as of September 9, 2023.

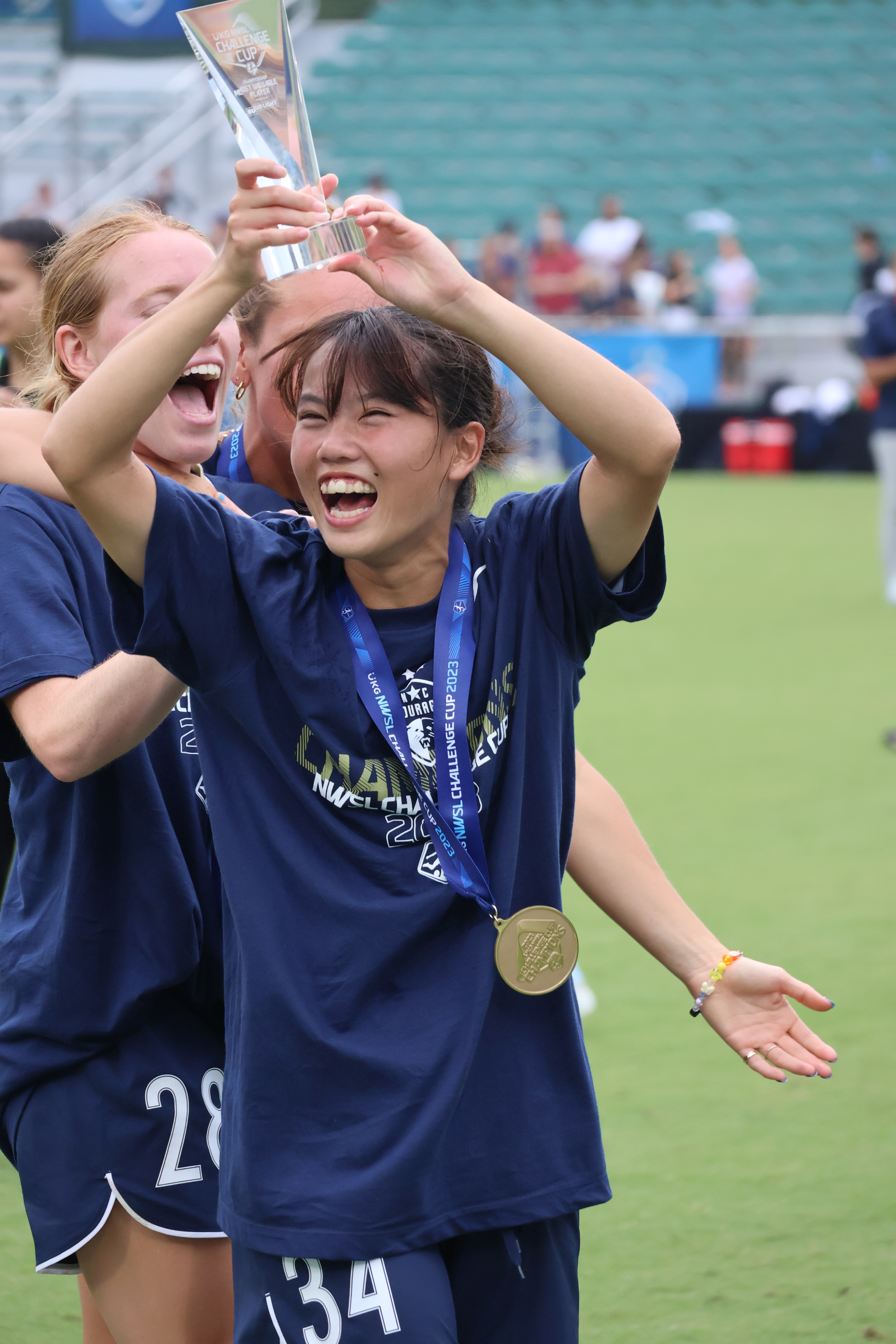
Manaka Matsukubo was named MVP of the 2023 Challenge Cup final.

The 2023 NWSL Challenge Cup, known as the 2023 UKG NWSL Challenge Cup for sponsorship reasons, was a league cup competition that took place during the 2023 National Women's Soccer League season. It was the fourth edition of the NWSL Challenge Cup tournament.

The 2023 NWSL Challenge Cup was the first time the NWSL Challenge Cup was played concurrently with the regular season, bringing it in line with most other league cup competitions worldwide. It was also the first edition under a multi-year sponsorship with UKG, which increased the pool of prize money to $1 million toward a goal of achieving equal compensation when compared to men's leagues and open cup competitions in the United States.

The North Carolina Courage defeated the Racing Louisville FC 2–0 in the final.

== Format ==
The 2023 NWSL Challenge Cup was a multi-stage tournament. All 12 NWSL teams participated in the Challenge Cup, and the tournament was played concurrently with the regular season. The tournament was split into three groups of four teams each, and each team played a six-game double round-robin with its group. Following the group stage, the top team of each group and the highest-placing group runner-up advanced to the single-elimination semifinals on September 6, with the winners competing in the final on September 9. Matches did not have extra-time periods, and semifinal and final matches drawn during regulation proceeded directly to kicks from the penalty mark.

=== Prize money ===
Players in the four semifinal teams divide the tournament's $1 million pool of prize money. Sponsor UKG determined a prize pool of that size would draw the tournament's rewards closer to that of the men's MLS is Back tournament, which had a $1.1 million prize pool in 2020. For comparison, the 2022 NWSL Challenge Cup prize pool was estimated to be about or less than $500,000.

=== Tiebreakers ===
A team's position in the divisional standings was determined by points, with three points awarded for a win, one point for a tie, and zero points for a loss. If two or more teams in the same group are tied on points at the end of the group stage, the following tiebreaking criteria were applied to determine the final group standings:

1. Greatest goal difference across all group stage matches.
2. Most goals scored across all group stage matches.
3. Direct head-to-head points record with teams involved in the tie.
4. Direct head-to-head goal difference in matches between teams involved in the tie.
5. Direct head-to-head number of goals scored in matches between teams involved in the tie.
6. Fewest disciplinary points accrued. Points will be awarded as follows, and players can receive only one disciplinary points assessment per match, with the highest taking precedent:
  1. yellow card: 1 point;
  2. (yellow card) (yellow-red card) indirect red card (as a result of two yellow cards): 3 points;
  3. (red card) direct red card: 4 points;
  4. (yellow card) (red card) yellow card and direct red card: 5 points.
7. If teams still could not be separated using the tiebreaking procedures, the NWSL would decide ranking using the random drawing of lots.

In the case of two or more teams from different divisions being tied on points at the end of the group stage, the competition follows the same procedure except for the use of the head-to-head scenarios by virtue of the fact teams from different divisions would not have played each other during the group stage.

== Group stage ==
=== East Division ===
Pos	Team	Pld	W	T	L	GF	GA	GD	Pts	Qualification	NC	NJY	WAS	ORL
1	North Carolina Courage	6	3	2	1	15	5	+10	11	Advance to knockout stage	—	1–1	6–0	0–0
2	NJ/NY Gotham FC	6	3	2	1	10	7	+3	11		2–0	—	1–0	1–1
3	Washington Spirit	6	3	0	3	10	13	−3	9		1–2	4–2	—	4–2
4	Orlando Pride	6	0	2	4	5	15	−10	2		1–1	1–3	0–1	—

Source: NWSL
April 19
19:00 ET

Orlando Pride	1–1	North Carolina Courage
Watt 56'	Report	O'Sullivan 90+9'

Exploria Stadium, Orlando, Florida
Attendance: 3,139
Referee: Gabriele Giusti

April 19
17:30 ET

NJ/NY Gotham FC	1–0	Washington Spirit
Williams 56'	Report

Red Bull Arena, Harrison, New Jersey
Attendance: 7,543
Referee: Shawn Tehini

May 3
19:00 ET

North Carolina Courage	1–1	NJ/NY Gotham FC
Gejl 3'	Report	Williams 74'

WakeMed Soccer Park, Cary, North Carolina
Attendance: 2,761
Referee: Joshua Encarnación

May 10
19:30 ET

Washington Spirit	4–2	Orlando Pride
Silano 33'; Staab 37'; Sheva 42'; Sanchez 90+4'	Report	Hansen 10'; Watt 49'

Audi Field, DC
Attendance: 4,991
Referee: Joshua Encarnación

June 14
19:30 ET

Washington Spirit	1–2	North Carolina Courage
McKeown 54'	Report	Ratcliffe 62'; Wingate 90+2'

Audi Field, DC
Attendance: 5,778
Referee: Mathew Corrigan

July 22
19:00 ET

North Carolina Courage	6–0	Washington Spirit
Ratcliffe 61'; Tagliaferri 65'; Wingate 70'; Boade 72'; Pinto 80'; Miura 83'	Report

WakeMed Soccer Park, Cary, North Carolina
Attendance: 4,063
Referee: Thomas Snyder

July 23
19:00 ET

Orlando Pride	1–3	NJ/NY Gotham FC
Montefusco 9'	Report	Nighswonger 35' (pen.); Zerboni 55'; Ryan 57'

Exploria Stadium, Orlando, Florida
Attendance: 4,051
Referee: Shawn Tehini

July 28
19:00 ET

Washington Spirit	4–2	NJ/NY Gotham FC
Hatch 25'; Biegalski 55'; Hatch 63'; Ricketts 70'	Report	Purce 4'; Nighswonger 8'

Audi Field, DC
Attendance: 4,732
Referee: Danielle Chesky

July 29
19:00 ET

North Carolina Courage	5–0	Orlando Pride
Ratcliffe 17'; Berkely 38'; Tagliaferri 48'; Hopkins 78', 89'	Report

WakeMed Soccer Park, Cary, North Carolina
Attendance: 3,543
Referee: Greg Dopka

August 4
19:00 ET

Orlando Pride	0–1	Washington Spirit
	Report	Speckmaier 90+8'

Exploria Stadium, Orlando, Florida
Attendance: 3,661
Referee: Brad Jensen

August 5
19:30 ET

NJ/NY Gotham FC	2–0	North Carolina Courage
Stengel 16'; Zerboni 59'	Report

Red Bull Arena, Harrison, New Jersey
Attendance: 3,004
Referee: Elvis Osmanovic

August 9
19:30 ET

NJ/NY Gotham FC	1–1	Orlando Pride
Shim 90+2'	Report	Bright 34'

Red Bull Arena, Harrison, New Jersey
Attendance: 2,038
Referee: Jeremy Scheer

=== Central Division ===
Pos	Team	Pld	W	T	L	GF	GA	GD	Pts	Qualification	KC	LOU	HOU	CHI
1	Kansas City Current	6	4	1	1	14	4	+10	13	Advance to knockout stage	—	3–0	3–1	4–0
2	Racing Louisville FC	6	4	0	2	10	6	+4	12	Advance to knockout stage based on ranking	3–2	—	3–0	2–0
3	Houston Dash	6	2	0	4	4	11	−7	6		0–2	1–0	—	2–0
4	Chicago Red Stars	6	1	1	4	3	10	−7	4		0–0	0–2	3–0	—

Source: NWSL
April 19
20:00 ET

Houston Dash	0–2	Kansas City Current
	Report	Kizer 36'; Lind 66' (o.g.)

Shell Energy Stadium, Houston, Texas
Attendance: 4,124
Referee: Laura Rodriguez

May 3
20:00 ET

Houston Dash	2–0	Chicago Red Stars
Olivieri 5'; Ordóñez 72' (pen.)	Report

Shell Energy Stadium, Houston, Texas
Attendance: 3,696
Referee: Adorae Monroy

May 17
19:30 ET

Racing Louisville FC	3–2	Kansas City Current
DeMelo 25', 30'; Borges 86'	Report	Cooper 17'; Debinha 89'

Lynn Family Stadium, Louisville, Kentucky
Attendance: 4,303
Referee: Alexandra Billeter

May 31
20:00 ET

Chicago Red Stars	0–2	Racing Louisville FC
	Report	Kanu 44'; Goins 71'

SeatGeek Stadium, Bridgeview, Illinois
Attendance: 1,762
Referee: Laura Rodriguez

June 14
20:00 ET

Racing Louisville FC	3–0	Houston Dash
Fischer 45+4'; DeMelo 45+6'; Goins 73'	Report

Lynn Family Stadium, Louisville, Kentucky
Attendance: 4,983
Referee: JC Griggs

June 14
20:00 ET

Kansas City Current	4–0	Chicago Red Stars
Debinha 54', 70'; DiBernardo 60'; Kizer 62'	Report

Children's Mercy Park, Kansas City, Kansas
Attendance: 8,226
Referee: Shawn Tehini

July 21
20:00 ET

Racing Louisville FC	2–0	Chicago Red Stars
Baggett 11'; Monaghan 19'	Report

Lynn Family Stadium, Louisville, Kentucky
Attendance: 5,499
Referee: Nabil Bensalah

July 22
20:00 ET

Kansas City Current	3–1	Houston Dash
Hamilton 45+1', 45+4', 68'	Report	Desiano 17'

Children's Mercy Park, Kansas City, Kansas
Attendance: 11,014
Referee: Laura Rodriguez

July 29
20:00 ET

Chicago Red Stars	0–0	Kansas City Current
	Report

SeatGeek Stadium, Bridgeview, Illinois
Attendance: 2,959
Referee: Abdou Ndiaye

July 29
20:30 ET

Houston Dash	1–0	Racing Louisville FC
Salmon 26'	Report

Shell Energy Stadium, Houston, Texas
Referee: Gaad David Flores Ramírez

August 5
20:00 ET

Kansas City Current	3–0	Racing Louisville FC
Hamilton 3', 81'; Mace 90+1'	Report

Children's Mercy Park, Kansas City, Kansas
Attendance: 9,321
Referee: Jon Freemon

August 5
20:00 ET

Chicago Red Stars	3–0	Houston Dash
Hocking 37', 43'; Nagasato 50'	Report

SeatGeek Stadium, Bridgeview, Illinois
Attendance: 3,137
Referee: Karen Callado

=== West Division ===
Pos	Team	Pld	W	T	L	GF	GA	GD	Pts	Qualification	RGN	LA	POR	SD
1	OL Reign	6	4	2	0	7	0	+7	14	Advance to knockout stage	—	0–0	0–0	1–0
2	Angel City FC	6	2	2	2	7	8	−1	8		0–2	—	2–1	2–1
3	Portland Thorns FC	6	2	1	3	8	7	+1	7		0–1	3–2	—	4–1
4	San Diego Wave FC	6	1	1	4	4	11	−7	4		0–3	1–1	1–0	—

Source: NWSL
April 19
22:00 ET

Angel City FC	0–2	OL Reign
	Report	Huitema 64'; Le Bihan 77' (o.g.)

BMO Stadium, Los Angeles, California
Attendance: 10,021
Referee: Anya Voigt

April 19
22:00 ET

San Diego Wave FC	1–0	Portland Thorns FC
Nally 65' (o.g.)	Report

Snapdragon Stadium, San Diego, California
Attendance: 9,504
Referee: Brandon Stevis

May 3
19:00 ET

OL Reign	0–0	Angel City FC
	Report

Lumen Field, Seattle, Washington
Attendance: 5,511
Referee: Adam Kilpatrick

May 31
22:00 ET

San Diego Wave FC	0–3	OL Reign
	Report	Brown 29'; Athens 54'; Huitema 60'

Snapdragon Stadium, San Diego, California
Attendance: 9,763
Referee: Anya Voigt

May 31
22:30 ET

Portland Thorns FC	3–2	Angel City FC
Vasconcelos 23'; D'Aquila 46'; Weaver 90+3'	Report	Le Bihan 61'; Emslie 66' (pen.)

Providence Park, Portland, Oregon
Attendance: 16,429
Referee: Adorae Monroy

June 28
22:00 ET

Angel City FC	2–1	San Diego Wave FC
Hammond 2'; Le Bihan 18'	Report	Colaprico 63'

BMO Stadium, Los Angeles, California
Attendance: 13,648
Referee: Katja Koroleva

June 28
22:30 ET

Portland Thorns FC	0–1	OL Reign
	Report	Bennett 55'

Providence Park, Portland, Oregon
Attendance: 16,252
Referee: Matthew Thompson

July 21
22:30 ET

Portland Thorns FC	4–1	San Diego Wave FC
Betfort 9', 58'; Weaver 54'; Reyes 61'	Report	Kornieck 81'

Providence Park, Portland, Oregon
Attendance: 16,393
Referee: Ricardo Fierro

July 28
22:00 ET

OL Reign	1–0	San Diego Wave FC
Balcer 71'	Report

Lumen Field, Seattle, Washington
Attendance: 7,513
Referee: Alyssa Nichols

July 29
22:00 ET

Angel City FC	2–1	Portland Thorns FC
McCaskill 9', 47'	Report	Weaver 44'

BMO Stadium, Los Angeles, California
Attendance: 13,154
Referee: Brandon Stevis

August 5
22:00 ET

San Diego Wave FC	1–1	Angel City FC
Shaw 11'	Report	Camberos 16'

Snapdragon Stadium, San Diego, California
Attendance: 14,408
Referee: Elijio Arreguin

August 6
20:00 ET

OL Reign	0–0	Portland Thorns FC
	Report

Lumen Field, Seattle, Washington
Attendance: 12,061
Referee: Mathew Corrigan

=== Ranking of second-placed teams ===
The best second-placed team from the group stage advances to the knockout stage.

Pos	Grp	Team	Pld	W	T	L	GF	GA	GD	Pts	Qualification
1	Central	Racing Louisville FC	6	4	0	2	10	6	+4	12	Advance to knockout stage
2	East	NJ/NY Gotham FC	6	3	2	1	10	7	+3	11	
3	West	Angel City FC	6	2	2	2	7	8	−1	8	

Source: NWSL

== Knockout stage ==
In the knockout stage, the semifinals occurred on September 6 and the final took place on September 9.

=== Bracket ===
Semifinals
1	OL Reign	0
4	Racing Louisville FC	1
2	Kansas City Current	0
3	North Carolina Courage	1

Championship
4	Racing Louisville FC	0
3	North Carolina Courage	2

==== Semi-finals ====
September 6
20:00 ET

Kansas City Current	0–1	North Carolina Courage
	Report	Kurtz (yellow card) 38'; Miura (yellow card) 51'; Boade (yellow card) 78'; Pinto (yellow card) 84', (goal) 90+6'

Children's Mercy Park, Kansas City, Kansas
Attendance: 4,590
Referee: Anya Voigt

September 6
22:00 ET

OL Reign	0–1	Racing Louisville FC
	Report	Davis 28'; Holloway (yellow card) 34'; Kgatlana (yellow card) 62'

Lumen Field, Seattle, Washington
Attendance: 3,906
Referee: Natalie Simon

==== Final ====
September 9
12:30 ET

North Carolina Courage	2–0	Racing Louisville FC
Kerolin 28'; Kurtz (yellow card) 45'; Matsukubo 54'	Report	DeMelo (yellow card) 73'

WakeMed Soccer Park, Cary, North Carolina
Attendance: 3,068
Referee: Alex Billeter

==== Notes ====
A.Match was interrupted and delayed approximately three hours by inclement weather. Attendance numbers were therefore imprecise and unreported.

== Statistics ==
=== Goalscorers ===
There were 101 goals scored in 39 matches, for an average of 2.59 goals per match.

5 goals

- (United States) Kristen Hamilton, KC

3 goals

- (Brazil) Debinha, KC
- (United States) Savannah DeMelo, LOU
- (United States) Brittany Ratcliffe, NC
- (United States) Morgan Weaver, POR

2 goals

- (United States) Penelope Hocking, CHI
- (United States) Cece Kizer, KC
- (France) Clarisse Le Bihan, LA
- (United States) Savannah McCaskill, LA
- (United States) Parker Goins, LOU
- (United States) Jenna Nighswonger, NJY
- (United States) Katie Stengel, NJY
- (United States) Lynn Williams, NJY
- (United States) McCall Zerboni, NJY
- (United States) Haley Hopkins, NC
- (United States) Brianna Pinto, NC
- (United States) Frankie Tagliaferri, NC
- (United States) Olivia Wingate, NC
- (Canada) Jordyn Huitema, RGN
- (United States) Ally Watt, ORL
- (United States) Hannah Betfort, POR
- (United States) Ashley Hatch, WAS

1 goal

- (United States) Yūki Nagasato, CHI
- (United States) Madelyn Desiano, HOU
- (Venezuela) Bárbara Olivieri, HOU
- (Mexico) Diana Ordóñez, HOU
- (England) Ebony Salmon, HOU
- (United States) Michelle Cooper, KC
- (United States) Vanessa DiBernardo, KC
- (United States) Hailie Mace, KC
- (Mexico) Scarlett Camberos, LA
- (Scotland) Claire Emslie, LA
- (United States) Madison Hammond, LA
- (United States) Jordan Baggett, LOU
- (Brazil) Ary Borges, LOU
- (United States) Kirsten Davis, LOU
- (United States) Kayla Fischer, LOU
- (Nigeria) Uchenna Kanu, LOU
- (United States) Paige Monaghan, LOU
- (United States) Margaret Purce, NJY
- (United States) Yazmeen Ryan, NJY
- (United States) Mana Shim, NJY
- (United States) Malia Berkely, NC
- (United States) Tess Boade, NC
- (Denmark) Mille Gejl, NC
- (Brazil) Kerolin, NC
- (Japan) Manaka Matsukubo, NC
- (Japan) Narumi Miura, NC
- (Republic of Ireland) Denise O'Sullivan, NC
- (United States) Messiah Bright, ORL
- (United States) Tori Hansen, ORL
- (United States) Megan Montefusco, ORL
- (United States) Izzy D'Aquila, POR
- (Mexico) Reyna Reyes, POR
- (United States) Michele Vasconcelos, POR
- (United States) Bethany Balcer, RGN
- (United States) Elyse Bennett, RGN
- (United States) Ryanne Brown, RGN
- (United States) Olivia Athens, RGN
- (United States) Danielle Colaprico, SD
- (United States) Taylor Kornieck, SD
- (United States) Jaedyn Shaw, SD
- (United States) Camryn Biegalski, WAS
- (United States) Tara McKeown, WAS
- (United States) Chloe Ricketts, WAS
- (United States) Ashley Sanchez, WAS
- (Republic of Ireland) Marissa Sheva, WAS
- (United States) Lena Silano, WAS
- (Venezuela) Mariana Speckmaier, WAS
- (United States) Sam Staab, WAS

1 own goal

- (United States) Katie Lind, KC (against HOU)
- (France) Clarisse Le Bihan, LA (against RGN)
- (United States) Meaghan Nally, POR (against SD)

Source: NWSL

Statistics do not include penalty-shootout goals.

=== Discipline ===
A player was automatically suspended for the next match in the tournament for the following offenses:

- Receiving a red card (red card suspensions could be extended for serious offenses);
- Receiving two yellow cards in two matches, unless the second yellow card was accumulated in the final match of group play;
- Direct red card suspensions that could not be served during the tournament were carried over to the NWSL regular season, but suspensions as a result of indirect red cards were not.

== Awards ==
Manaka Matsukubo was awarded the MVP of the 2023 NWSL Challenge Cup final match, and Kristen Hamilton was named the overall MVP of the tournament.

Named to the All-Tournament team:

Pos.	Player	Club
GK	(United States) Katie Lund	Racing Louisville FC
DF	(United States) Malia Berkely	North Carolina Courage
DF	(New Zealand) Abby Erceg	Racing Louisville FC
DF	(United States) Shae Holmes	OL Reign
DF	(United States) Jenna Nighswonger	NJ/NY Gotham FC
MF	(Brazil) Debinha	Kansas City Current
MF	(United States) Savannah DeMelo	Racing Louisville FC
MF	(United States) Jaelin Howell	Racing Louisville FC
FW	(United States) Kristen Hamilton	Kansas City Current
FW	(United States) Brittany Ratcliffe	North Carolina Courage
