= Hina Sugita =

Japanese footballer (born 1997)

Hina Sugita 杉田 妃和
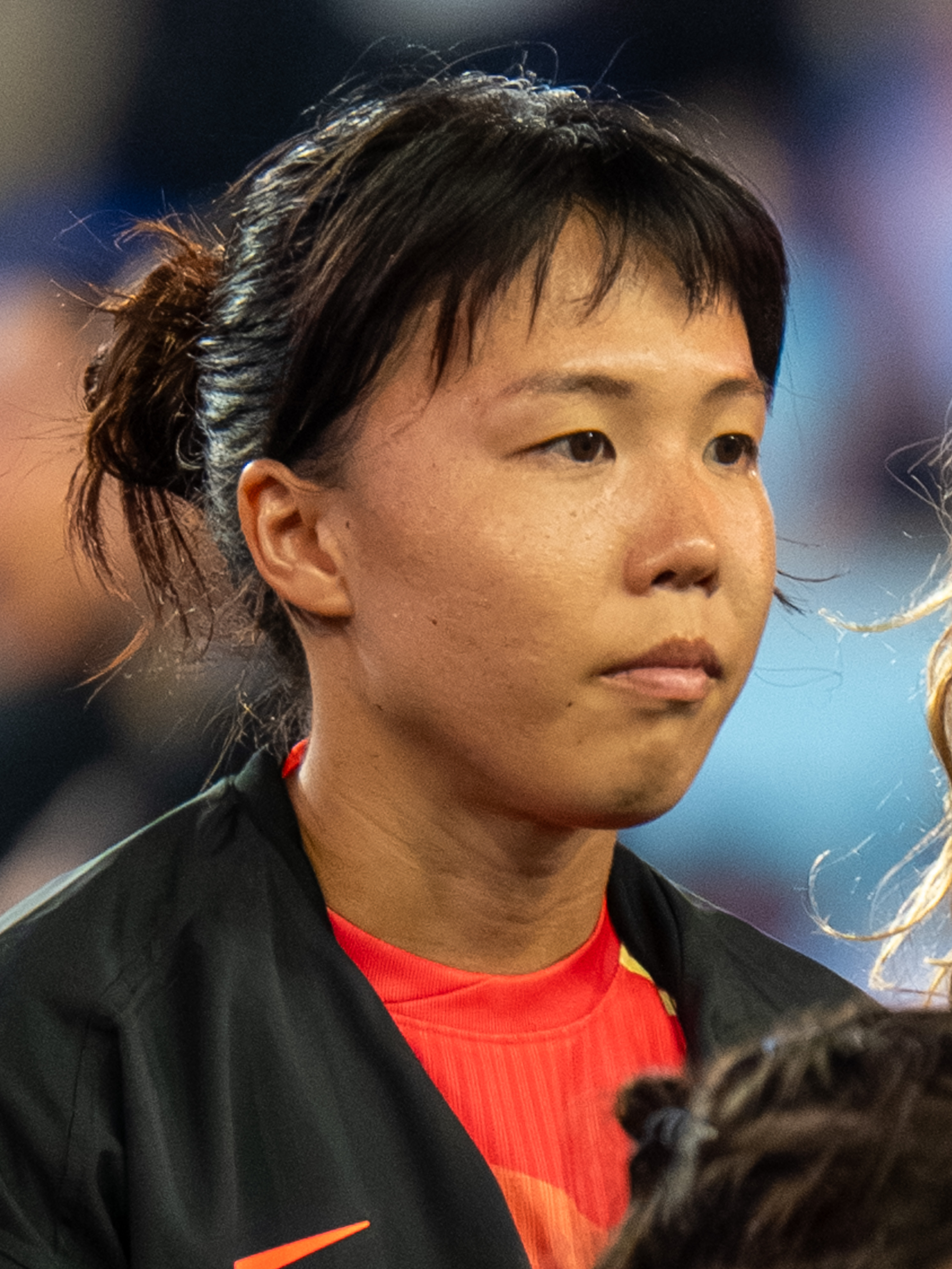
- Sugita in 2025

Personal information
- Full name: Hina Sugita
- Date of birth: 31 January 1997 (age 29)
- Place of birth: Kitakyushu, Japan
- Height: 1.61 m (5 ft 3 in)
- Position: Midfielder

Team information
- Current team: Angel City
- Number: 7

Youth career
- 2012–2014: Fujieda Junshin High School

Senior career*
Years	Team	Apps	(Gls)
2015–2022	INAC Kobe Leonessa	102	(17)
2022–2025	Portland Thorns	82	(13)
2025–	Angel City	4	(0)

International career^{‡}
2012–2014	Japan U-17	9	(7)
2016	Japan U-20	6	(1)
2018–	Japan	46	(3)
Medal record
Representing Japan
FIFA U-20 Women's World Cup
Bronze medal – third place	2016 Papua New Guinea
AFC U-19 Women's Championship
Gold medal – first place	2015 China
FIFA U-17 Women's World Cup
Gold medal – first place	2014 Costa Rica
AFC U-16 Women's Championship
Gold medal – first place	2013 China
- * Club domestic league appearances and goals as of 22:10, 11 November 2025 (UTC) ‡ National team caps and goals as of 03:49, 5 November 2024 (UTC)

Hina Sugita (杉田 妃和, Sugita Hina; born 31 January 1997) is a Japanese professional footballer who plays as a midfielder for Angel City FC of the National Women's Soccer League (NWSL) and the Japan national team.

== Club career ==
After graduating from high school, Sugita joined Nadeshiko League club INAC Kobe Leonessa in 2015. She debuted as a midfielder in 2015. She became a regular player in 2016 and was selected for the Best Young player award in the 2016 season.

On 26 January 2022, Sugita joined the Portland Thorns on a three-year deal. She won the 2022 NWSL Championship with the club.

On 30 September 2025, Thorns traded Sugita to Angel City FC in exchange for M.A. Vignola and $600,000 in intra-league transfer funds. On 17 March 2026, it was announced that Sugita had been placed on the season-ending injury list after she had sustained an ACL tear in her left leg.

== International career ==
In September 2012, when Sugita was 15 years old, she was selected for Japan's U-17 national team for 2012 U-17 Women's World Cup. She played all 4 matches and scored 2 goals. In 2013, she played at the 2013 AFC U-16 Women's Championship, which Japan won for the second time in a row. She also scored 6 goals and was selected as the tournament MVP. In 2014, she was selected for Japan's U-17 team for the 2014 U-17 Women's World Cup. She played 5 matches as captain, scoring 5 goals and leading Japan to its first championship, as well as winning the tournament's Golden Ball (MVP). In November 2016, she was selected for Japan's U-20 national team for the 2016 U-20 Women's World Cup. She played all 6 matches and Japan won the third place. She was also selected Golden Ball award.

On 2 August 2018, Sugita debuted for the Japanese national team as substitute midfielder in the 72nd minute against Australia.

On 10 May 2019, Sugita was included in the 23-player squad for the 2019 FIFA Women's World Cup.

On 18 June 2021, she was included in the Japan squad for the 2020 Summer Olympics.

On 13 June 2023, she was included in the 23-player squad for the FIFA Women's World Cup 2023.

== Career statistics ==
=== Club ===
As of match played 2 November 2024

Appearances and goals by club, season and competition
Club	Season	League			National cup (Note: Includes Empress's Cup)		League cup (Note: Includes Nadeshiko League Cup, WE League Cup, NWSL Challenge Cup)		Total	
Club	Season	Division	Apps	Goals	Apps	Goals	Apps	Goals	Apps	Goals
INAC Kobe Leonessa	2015	Nadeshiko League	4	0	2	0	—		6	0
INAC Kobe Leonessa	2016	Nadeshiko League	17	3	4	0	8	1	29	4
INAC Kobe Leonessa	2017	Nadeshiko League	18	2	2	1	9	1	29	4
INAC Kobe Leonessa	2018	Nadeshiko League	18	5	5	0	9	1	32	6
INAC Kobe Leonessa	2019	Nadeshiko League	18	3	4	0	2	0	24	3
INAC Kobe Leonessa	2020	Nadeshiko League	18	3	2	0	—		20	3
INAC Kobe Leonessa	2021–22	WE League	9	1	1	0	—		10	1
INAC Kobe Leonessa	Total		102	17	20	1	28	3	150	21
Portland Thorns	2022	NWSL	23	5	—		5	2	28	7
Portland Thorns	2023	NWSL	19	6	—		1	0	20	6
Portland Thorns	2024	NWSL	21	2	—		—		21	2
Portland Thorns	Total		63	13	—		6	2	69	15
Career total			165	30	20	1	34	5	219	36

=== International ===
As of match played 4 June 2024

Appearances and goals by national team and year
National Team	Year	Apps	Goals
Japan	2018	1	0
Japan	2019	14	0
Japan	2020	3	0
Japan	2021	9	2
Japan	2022	5	0
Japan	2023	13	1
Japan	2024	1	0
Total		46	3

Scores and results list Japan's goal tally first, score column indicates score after each Sugita goal.

List of international goals scored by Hina Sugita
No.	Date	Venue	Opponent	Score	Result	Competition
1	11 April 2021	Japan National Stadium, Tokyo, Japan	Panama	7–0	7–0	Friendly
2	10 June 2021	Edion Stadium Hiroshima, Hiroshima, Japan	Ukraine	6–0	8–0	Friendly
3	23 September 2023	Kitakyushu Stadium, Kitakyushu, Japan	Argentina	6–0	8–0	Friendly

== Honors ==
INAC Kobe Leonessa

- Empress's Cup: 2015, 2016

Portland Thorns FC

- NWSL Championship: 2022
