= Olivia Wingate =

American soccer player (born 2000)

- Wingate with Gotham FC in 2026

Personal information
- Full name: Olivia Ann Wingate
- Date of birth: January 20, 2000 (age 26)
- Place of birth: Medford, Massachusetts, U.S.
- Height: 5 ft 7 in (1.70 m)
- Position: Forward

Team information
- Current team: Gotham FC
- Number: 29

Youth career
- FC Stars

College career
Years	Team	Apps	(Gls)
2018–2022	Notre Dame Fighting Irish	95	(26)

Senior career*
Years	Team	Apps	(Gls)
2023–2026	North Carolina Courage	28	(2)
2026–	Gotham FC	2	(0)

International career
2015–2016	United States U-16	6	(2)
2017	United States U-18	3	(0)
- * Club domestic league appearances and goals as of November 1, 2026

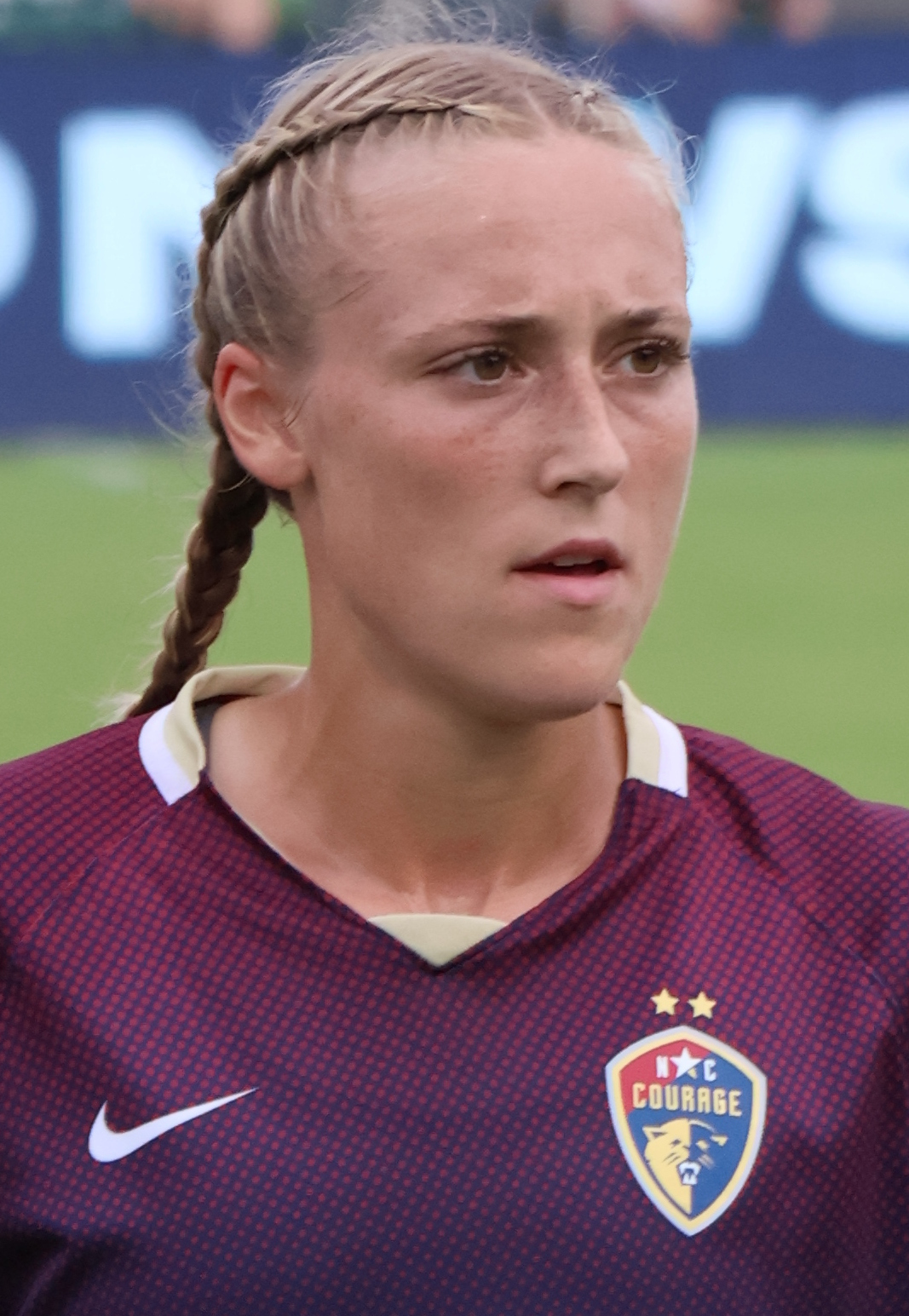
Wingate with the North Carolina Courage in 2023

Olivia Ann Wingate (born January 20, 2000) is an American professional soccer player who plays as a forward for Gotham FC of the National Women's Soccer League (NWSL). She played college soccer for the Notre Dame Fighting Irish and was selected sixth overall by the North Carolina Courage in the 2023 NWSL Draft.

== Early life ==
Wingate was born in Medford, Massachusetts, the second of four children of Carol and Steven Wingate, and raised in nearby Wilmington. She started playing soccer at age four and played other sports growing up such as softball, basketball, and ice hockey. She played ECNL club soccer for FC Stars. She played one season of ice hockey as a freshman at Wilmington High School, leading the team with about 20 goals as a forward.

Wingate played two seasons of high school soccer, scoring 12 goals in about 10 games as a sophomore in 2015 and recording 17 goals and 5 assists in 13 games as a junior in 2016. She helped lead the Wilmington Wildcats to undefeated regular-season records, but they made early departures from the state tournament both years. She was twice named the Middlesex League Player of the Year. She committed to the Notre Dame Fighting Irish as a sophomore in 2015. In the spring of 2017, she sustained a knee injury after colliding with an opposing goalkeeper, which sidelined her for more than a year until two weeks before her first college game.

== College career ==
Wingate appeared in every game for Notre Dame Fighting Irish from 2018 to 2022, becoming a consistent starter in the middle of her sophomore year. After scoring five goals over her first three seasons, she raised her production in her senior year with seven goals and five assists in 2021. She scored twice in the NCAA tournament, leveling in a second-round win over Purdue and netting in a loss to Arkansas in the third round. She was named to the All-ACC third team after leading the conference in shot accuracy (0.640).

Wingate scored a career-high 14 goals and added 5 assists in her final college season in 2022. She was named ACC Offensive Player of the Week twice, once for a second-half hat trick against Wisconsin and again for recording two goals and two assists in a pair of wins over NC State and Florida State. She scored three goals in the NCAA tournament to help Notre Dame reach the quarterfinals, where they lost to North Carolina. Wingate was named first-team All-ACC and third-team All-American.

== Club career ==
=== North Carolina Courage ===
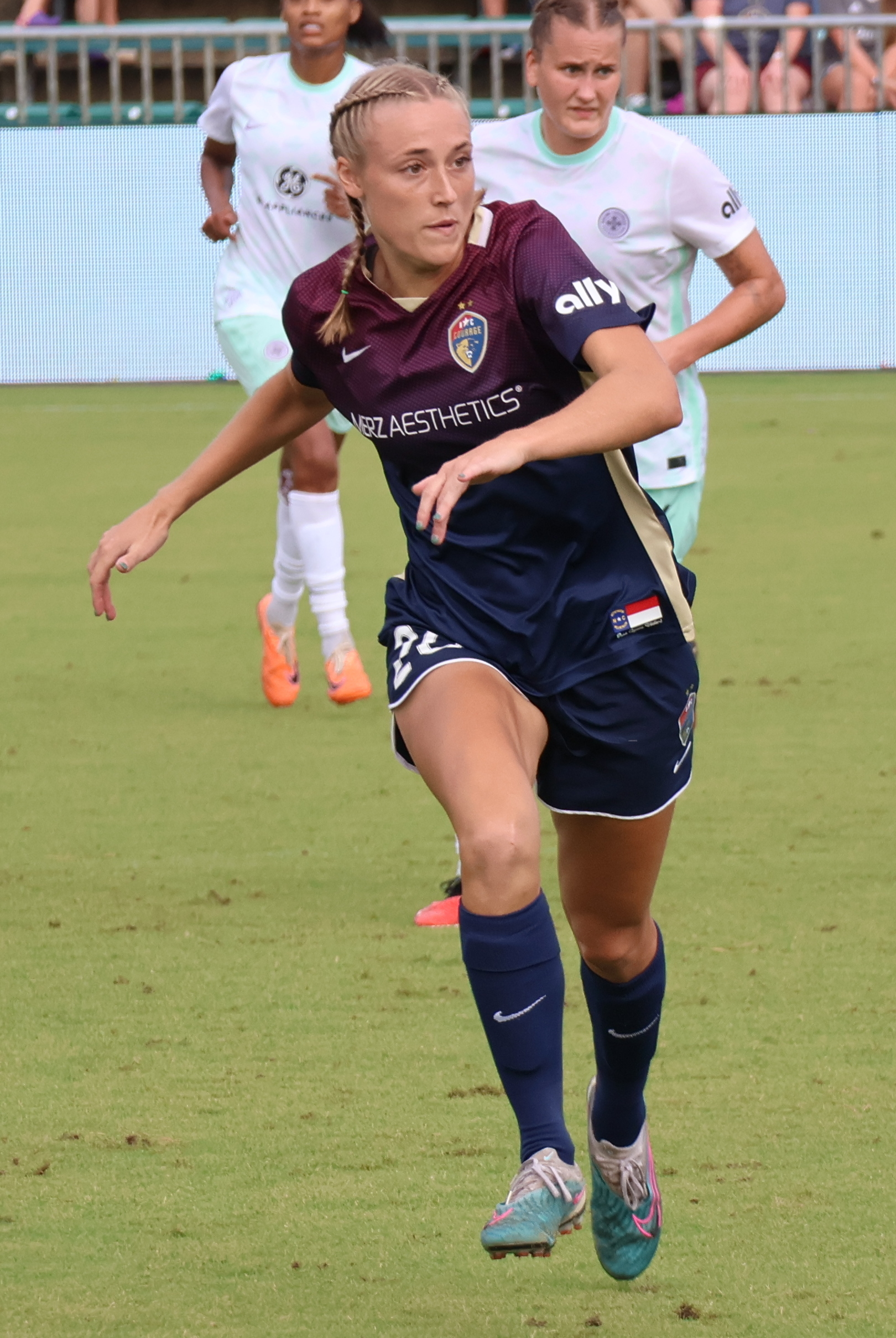
Wingate playing for the Courage in the 2023 NWSL Challenge Cup final

The North Carolina Courage selected Wingate sixth overall in the 2023 NWSL Draft with the first of their four first-round draft picks. She was signed to a three-year contract. She made her professional debut in the 65th minute of the opening matchday against the Kansas City Current on March 25. On June 14, she scored her first professional goal in stoppage time against the Washington Spirit, securing a 2–1 win in the NWSL Challenge Cup group stage. She finished her rookie season with 2 goals and 4 assists in 23 appearances, making 3 starts, in all competitions.

On July 7, 2024, Wingate scored her first NWSL regular-season goal in her first appearance of the season, a 3–1 win against Racing Louisville. On October 12, she responded to Christen Press's stoppage-time goal for Angel City with one of her own in the 90+10th minute, preserving the Courage's 21-game home unbeaten streak with a 1–1 draw. Injured for much of the early part of the season, she had 2 goals and 2 assists in 13 games, with 2 starts, in all competitions.

Wingate missed the entire following season as she underwent surgery on the lateral collateral ligament (LCL) in her left knee in June 2025. In January 2026, she re-signed with the Courage on a one-year deal. After one and a half years out of action, she returned to the field in a 4–0 win over the Chicago Stars on May 16, 2026.

=== Gotham FC ===
On October 8, 2026, Wingate made a free deadline day transfer to reigning champions Gotham FC. She made her club debut just over a week later in a 1–0 defeat to the Washington Spirit.

== International career ==
Wingate was first called up to the United States under-16 team in 2015. She scored two goals in three games in an under-16 friendly tournament in Italy in May 2016. She made three appearances with the under-16s at a tournament in the Netherlands in September of that year. She played for the under-18 team on a three-game tour of England in February 2017.

== Playing style ==
Wingate is known for her speed. She has cited Mia Hamm and Christen Press as inspirations.

== Honors and awards ==
North Carolina Courage

- NWSL Challenge Cup: 2023

Gotham FC

- NWSL Shield: 2026

Individual

- Third-team All-American: 2022
- First-team All-ACC: 2022
- Third-team All-ACC: 2021
- Wilmington Town Crier's Female Athlete of the Year: 2016, 2022
- Wilmington Town Crier's Female Athlete of the Decade: 2010s
