= 2023 NWSL Challenge Cup final =

Championship game of the 2023 NWSL Challenge Cup

- Event: 2023 NWSL Challenge Cup
North Carolina Courage	Racing Louisville FC
2	0
- Date: September 9, 2023
- Venue: WakeMed Soccer Park, Cary, North Carolina
- Final MVP: Manaka Matsukubo
- Referee: Alex Billeter
- Attendance: 3,068

The 2023 NWSL Challenge Cup Final, the final match of the 2023 NWSL Challenge Cup, was contested by North Carolina Courage and Racing Louisville FC.

== Road to the final ==
Note: In all results below, the score of the finalist is given first.

North Carolina Courage		Round	Racing Louisville FC	
Opponent	Result	Group stage	Opponent	Result
Orlando Pride	1–1	Match 1	Kansas City Current	3–2
NJ/NY Gotham FC	1–1	Match 2	Chicago Red Stars	2–0
Washington Spirit	2–1	Match 3	Houston Dash	3–0
Washington Spirit	6–0	Match 4	Chicago Red Stars	2–0
Orlando Pride	5–0	Match 5	Houston Dash	0–1
NJ/NY Gotham FC	0–2	Match 6	Kansas City Current	0–3
Opponent	Result	Knockout stage	Opponent	Result
Kansas City Current	1–0	Semifinal	OL Reign	1–0

== Match ==
=== Details ===
September 9
12:30 ET

North Carolina Courage	2–0	Racing Louisville FC
Kerolin 28'; Kurtz (yellow card) 45'; Matsukubo 54'	Report	DeMelo (yellow card) 73'

WakeMed Soccer Park, Cary, North Carolina
Attendance: 3,068
Referee: Alex Billeter

Most Valuable Player:
Manaka Matsukubo, NC

Assistant referees
Tiffini Turpin
Seth Barton
Fourth official
Brad Jensen
Reserve assistant referee
Matthew Rodman

Match rules

- 90 minutes.
- Penalty shoot-out if scores level.
- Maximum of five substitutions. (Note: Each team was given only three opportunities to make substitutions, excluding substitutions made at half-time.)
