= Izzy D'Aquila =

American soccer player (born 2001)

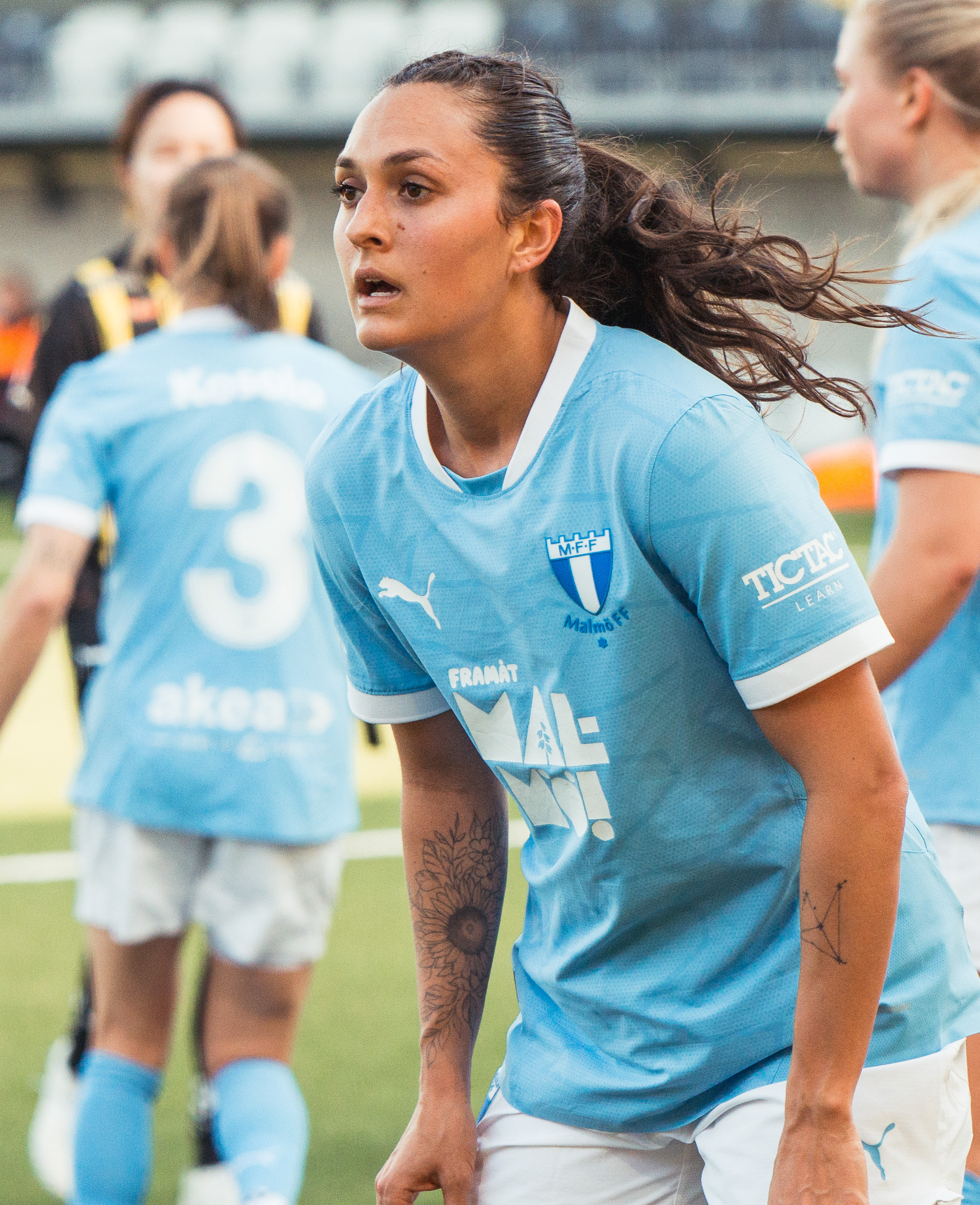
- D'Aquila with Malmö FF in 2025

Personal information
- Full name: Isabella Louise D'Aquila
- Date of birth: September 8, 2001 (age 25)
- Place of birth: Mission Viejo, California, United States
- Height: 5 ft 6 in (1.68 m)
- Position: Forward

Team information
- Current team: Malmö FF
- Number: 24

Youth career
- So Cal Blues
- 2015–2019: JSerra Catholic High School

College career
Years	Team	Apps	(Gls)
2019–2023	Santa Clara Broncos	78	(50)

Senior career*
Years	Team	Apps	(Gls)
2023–2024	Portland Thorns	29	(2)
2025–	Malmö FF	21	(12)

International career^{‡}
2018–2019	United States U17		
2019	United States U20		
- * Club domestic league appearances and goals as of 24 June 2026 ‡ National team caps and goals as of April 2, 2023

Isabella Louise D'Aquila (born September 8, 2001) is an American professional soccer player who plays as a forward for Malmö FF of the Damallsvenskan. She previously played for Portland Thorns FC of the National Women's Soccer League (NWSL).

== Youth career ==
D'Aquila grew up in Mission Viejo, California, a suburb of Orange County in southern California. She played high school soccer for JSerra Catholic High School and was named national Gatorade High School Player of the Year for the 2017–18 season, and ALL-USA Girls Soccer Player of the Year by TopDrawerSoccer.com and USA Today in 2017-18 and 2018–19. D'Aquila scored 134 total goals for JSerra. She also played for the So Cal Blues youth soccer club in the Elite Clubs National League.

== College career ==
D'Aquila played NCAA Division I women's soccer for the Santa Clara Broncos. In her senior season, D'Aquila scored 19 goals, second-most in the NCAA. She scored a total of 50 goals and 16 assists in 78 appearances. D'Aquila also won the 2020 NCAA Division I Women's Soccer Tournament with the Broncos, in which she scored three goals to tie for second-most scored in the tournament, and also scored the championship-winning penalty shoot-out goal.

== Club career ==
=== Portland Thorns FC, 2023–2024 ===
After reports and analysis rated her as a potential early selection in the 2023 NWSL Draft, defending NWSL champions Thorns FC selected D'Aquila with the 12th overall pick in the first round. On March 15, 2023, D'Aquila signed a three-year contract with the club, plus an option for a fourth year.

On March 26, 2023, D'Aquila made her debut for the Thorns in a 4–0 victory against Orlando Pride as a 77th-minute substitute for Sophia Smith.

=== Malmö FF, 2025– ===
On January 7, 2025, Swedish football club Malmö FF signed D'Aquila to a two-year contract for the club's first year in Sweden's top league.

== International career ==
D'Aquila played for the United States women's national under-17 soccer team in the 2018 FIFA U-17 Women's World Cup. She also trained and played with the United States under-20 team.

== Career statistics ==
As of match played October 15, 2024

Appearances and goals by club, season and competition
Club	Season	League			Cup (Note: Includes the NWSL Challenge Cup (2023) and NWSL x Liga MX Femenil Summer Cup (2024))		Continental (Note: Includes the CONCACAF W Champions Cup (2024))		Playoffs (Note: Includes NWSL Playoffs)		Total	
Club	Season	Division	Apps	Goals	Apps	Goals	Apps	Goals	Apps	Goals	Apps	Goals
Portland Thorns FC	2023	NWSL	15	0	6	1	—		0	0	21	1
Portland Thorns FC	2024	NWSL	13	2	3	1	4	3	—		20	6
Career total			28	2	9	2	4	3	0	0	41	7

== Honors ==
Santa Clara Broncos

- NCAA Division I Women's Soccer Championship: 2020

Individual

- Gatorade National Female Soccer Player of the Year: 2018
