= Mike Norris (football manager) =

English football manager (born 1979)

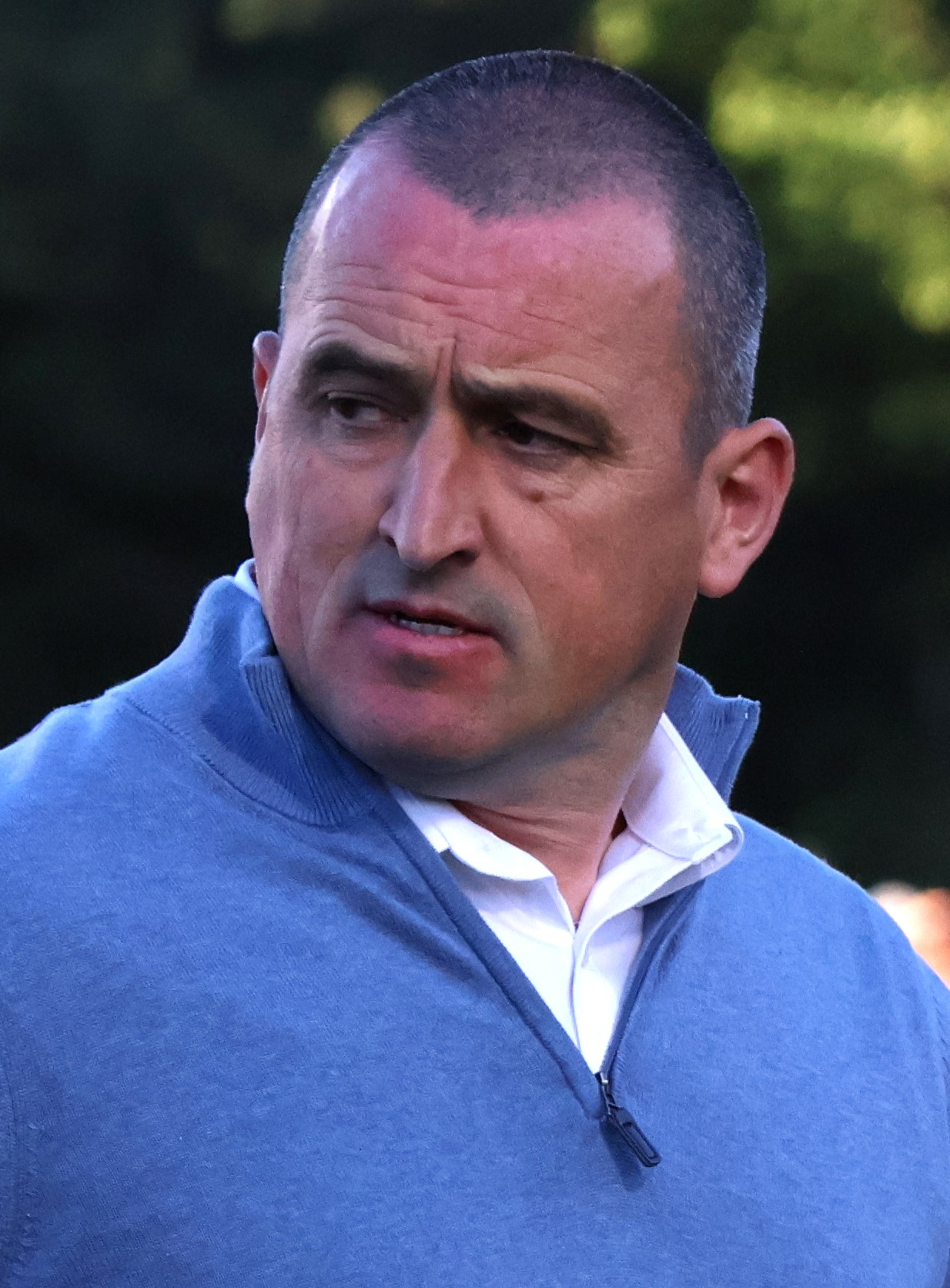
- Norris in 2024

Personal information
- Full name: Michael Norris
- Date of birth: 8 October 1979 (age 47)
- Place of birth: Ashington, England
- Height: 6 ft 3 in (1.90 m)
- Position: Goalkeeper

Team information
- Current team: Portland Thorns (Technical Director)

Youth career
- Years: Team
- Cramlington Juniors
- England Boys Club
- York City

Managerial career
- 2007–2014: Mountain United FC (GK coach)
- 2009–2013: Quest University Kermodes (assistant/GK coach)
- 2009–2013: Quest University Kermodes Women (GK coach)
- 2013–2015: UBC Thunderbirds Women (GK coach)
- 2014–2016: Vancouver Whitecaps FC Academy (GK coach)
- 2014–2019: Canada U20 Women (GK coach)
- 2014: Canada U15 Women (GK coach)
- 2015: Canada U23 Women (GK coach)
- 2018: Canada U17 Women (GK coach)
- 2019: Canada U17 (GK coach)
- 2019–2021: Canada Women (GK coach)
- 2022–2023: Portland Thorns FC (assistant)
- 2023–2024: Portland Thorns FC

Michael Norris (born 8 October 1979) is an English football manager who is the Technical Director of the Portland Thorns in the National Women's Soccer League.

== Playing career ==
Norris played youth football as a goalkeeper for Cramlington Juniors, England Boys Club and York City.

== Coaching career ==
Norris earned his FA Preliminary Licence (now known as the FA Coaching Level 2 Licence) in 1998, as well as his FA Goalkeeper Coaching Level 2 Licence in the same year. He earned his Canada Soccer Coaching B Diploma in 2014, followed by a Coaching A Diploma in 2019.

After settling in Vancouver in 2006, his former goalkeeping coach Simon Smith also arrived in the area. Smith hired Norris to work at the new Simon Smith Goalkeeping Academy. Norris would later on set up his own academy program, Michael Norris Pro Goalkeeping. In 2007, he began coach in Burnaby for youth club Mountain FC, later known as Mountain United FC, where he served until 2014. In 2009, he began working as the goalkeeping coach for the men's and women's football teams of Quest University in Canada. He also served as an assistant coach for the men's team. In 2013, he left to become the goalkeeping coach for the UBC Thunderbirds women's football team at the University of British Columbia, where he worked until 2015. From 2014 to 2016, he worked at the Vancouver Whitecaps FC Academy, serving as the goalkeeping coach for men's and women's youth teams.

In 2014, Norris began working as a goalkeeping coach for various Canadian youth national teams. This included the under-15, under-17, under-20 and under-23 women's teams, as well as the under-17 men's team at the 2019 CONCACAF U-17 Championship. In late 2019, he began working as the set piece and goalkeeping coach for the Canada women's senior national team. The team went on to win the gold medal at the 2020 Olympic Football Tournament.

The following year, Norris joined Portland Thorns FC in the National Women's Soccer League as an assistant coach. The team won the championship in the 2022 season, though coach Rhian Wilkinson resigned at the end of the season. On 9 January 2023, Norris was appointed as head coach of the Portland Thorns.

== Personal life ==
Norris was born in Ashington and grew up in Newcastle upon Tyne. Since 2006 he has lived in Burnaby, British Columbia, with his wife and two daughters.
