= Gabby Provenzano =

American soccer player (born 1999)

Personal information
- Full name: Gabriella Alyssa Provenzano
- Date of birth: August 7, 1999 (age 27)
- Place of birth: Sergeantsville, New Jersey, U.S.
- Height: 5 ft 5 in (1.65 m)
- Positions: Midfielder; center back

Youth career
- 2007–2017: Players Development Academy
- 2013–2016: Hunterdon Central Red Devils

College career
Years	Team	Apps	(Gls)
2017–2021	Rutgers Scarlet Knights	103	(5)

Senior career*
Years	Team	Apps	(Gls)
2022–2024	Portland Thorns	4	(0)
2025–2026	Tampa Bay Sun	28	(1)
- * Club domestic league appearances and goals as of 03:46, May 18, 2026 (UTC)

Gabriella Alyssa Provenzano (born August 7, 1999) is an American professional soccer player who plays as a midfielder or a center back. She played college soccer for the Rutgers Scarlet Knights before being drafted by Portland Thorns FC in the second round of the 2022 NWSL Draft. She has previously played for USL Super League club Tampa Bay Sun FC.

== Youth career ==
Provenzano played youth soccer at Elite Clubs National League club Players Development Academy (PDA) from ages 8 to 18. One of her coaches at PDA was Mike O'Neill, who would later manage her at the Rutgers Scarlet Knights. She later played as a forward and an attacking midfielder for the soccer team of her high school, Hunterdon Central Regional High School.

== College career ==
Provenzano played NCAA Division I women's soccer for the Rutgers Scarlet Knights. Having started as a defensive midfielder, Rutgers moved her to the center back role in her junior year. During her time at Rutgers, Provenzano was nicknamed "The General" by manager O'Neill, who also named her as team captain.

Provenzano collected 103 career appearances and played 8,568 minutes for Rutgers, both program records. In 2021, she captained Rutgers to its first Big Ten Conference championship in any sport since the school joined the conference in 2014. The 2021 Big Ten women's soccer tournament named her to the all-tournament team, and she featured in the 2021 NCAA Division I Women's Soccer Tournament, where Rutgers fell in the semifinals to eventual champions Florida State. The Big Ten Conference also named Provenzano its 2021 defensive player of the year, and she was named a semifinalist for the national MAC Hermann Trophy.

== Club career ==
=== Portland Thorns ===
In December 2021, NWSL club Portland Thorns FC selected Provenzano with the 22nd overall pick in the 2022 NWSL Draft. In the process, she became the ninth Rutgers player to be drafted by an NWSL club, as well as the third Rutgers player drafted by the Portland-based team. On March 15, 2022, Thorns FC announced that the club had signed Provenzano to a one-year contract, with an option for an additional year. On March 5, 2022, Provenzano made her professional debut for Thorns FC in a 0–0 preseason draw against OL Reign. On March 31, 2022, Provenzano made her professional competitive debut for Thorns FC in a 3–0 2022 NWSL Challenge Cup victory against Angel City FC, coming on as a 84th-minute substitute. Having collected four appearances throughout the 2022 season, she gained her first professional title as Thorns FC won the NWSL Playoffs over Kansas City Current.

In March 2023, Thorns FC exercised their option on Provenzano's contract for a second year ahead of the 2023 season. The remainder of her Thorns career was marred by injuries, with Provenzano tearing her left achilles before 2024. At the end of the season, Provenzano was out of contract with the Thorns and was not re-signed ahead of the 2025 season.

=== Tampa Bay Sun ===
In 2025, Provenzano joined USL Super League side Tampa Bay Sun FC for the second half of the club's inaugural campaign. She helped contribute to the team's second-place finish and resulting qualification for the league's playoffs. Provenzano then returned to the Sun for the 2025–26 season, where she played in 24 matches as Tampa Bay finished second-to-last in the Super League standings. On June 15, 2026, the Sun announced Provenzano's departure after one-and-a-half seasons in Tampa Bay.

== Honors ==
Portland Thorns FC

- NWSL Championship: 2022

Tampa Bay Sun FC

- USL Super League: 2024–25

Individual

- Big Ten Conference Defensive Player of the Year: 2021
