= Meaghan Nally =

American soccer player (born 1998)

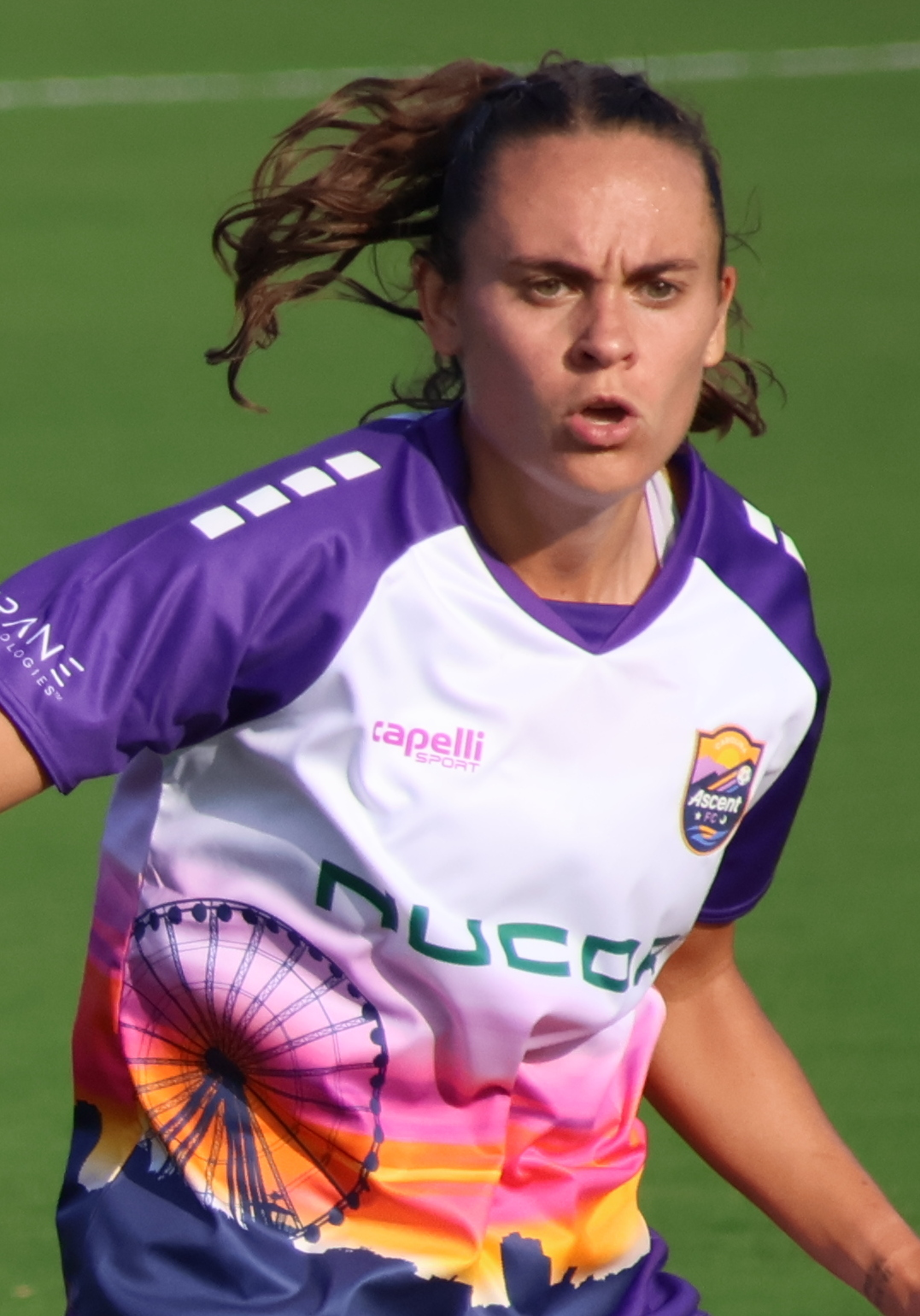
- Nally with the Carolina Ascent in 2025

Personal information
- Full name: Meaghan Elizabeth Nally
- Date of birth: June 30, 1998 (age 28)
- Place of birth: Fairfax, Virginia, United States
- Height: 5 ft 7 in (1.70 m)
- Position: Center back

Team information
- Current team: Carolina Ascent
- Number: 19

Youth career
- 2008–2016: FC Virginia

College career
Years	Team	Apps	(Gls)
2016–2019	Georgetown Hoyas	88	(8)

Senior career*
Years	Team	Apps	(Gls)
2020–2024	Portland Thorns	25	(0)
2020	→ Turbine Potsdam (loan)	9	(0)
2024–2025	OB Q	23	(1)
2025–	Carolina Ascent	13	(1)

International career
2019	United States U23		
- * Club domestic league appearances and goals as of 17:28, June 4, 2026 (UTC)

Meaghan Elizabeth Nally (born June 30, 1998) is an American professional soccer player who plays as a center back for USL Super League club Carolina Ascent.

== Early life and college career ==
Born in Fairfax, Virginia, Nally began her career at FC Virginia where she played from 2008 to 2016, before she began playing college soccer for the Georgetown Hoyas. During her first season, she appeared in 21 games, starting once against the USC Trojans in the 2016 Women's College Cup. The next season, she started 20 games for the Hoyas, scoring 3 goals, before appearing in all 25 games for her college in 2018.

== Club career ==
=== Portland Thorns, 2020–2024 ===
On January 16, 2020, Nally was selected with the 25th overall pick in the NWSL College Draft by the Portland Thorns. After not appearing for the Thorns in the NWSL Challenge Cup, Nally was loaned out to German Frauen-Bundesliga club Turbine Potsdam. She played 9 matches while in Germany, helping her side keep four cleansheets.

In 2021, Nally returned from her loan and made her professional debut for the Thorns on April 15, 2021, against the Chicago Red Stars in the Challenge Cup. She came on as an 83rd-minute substitute in the 1–0 victory.

On July 26, 2024, Nally was waived.

=== Odense Boldklub Q, 2024–2025 ===
In August 2024, Nally signed a contract with Odense Boldklub Q in the Danish Women's 1st Division. She made her first appearance for the club on August 10 and scored one goal.

=== Carolina Ascent, 2025–present ===
Carolina Ascent FC of the USL Super League signed Nally on July 12, 2025. Nally made her Ascent debut on August 30, coming on as a stoppage-time substitute for Maddie Mercado in Carolina's season-opening draw with Fort Lauderdale United FC.

== Career statistics ==
As of match played April 15, 2021

Appearances and goals by club, season and competition
Club	Season	League			Cup		Continental		Total	
Club	Season	Division	Apps	Goals	Apps	Goals	Apps	Goals	Apps	Goals
Portland Thorns	2020	National Women's Soccer League	0	0	0	0	—	—	0	0
Portland Thorns	2021	National Women's Soccer League	0	0	1	0	—	—	1	0
Portland Thorns	Total		0	0	1	0	0	0	1	0
Turbine Potsdam (loan)	2020–21	Frauen-Bundesliga	9	0	1	0	—	—	10	0
Career total			9	0	2	0	0	0	11	0

== Honors ==
Portland Thorns FC

- NWSL Challenge Cup: 2021
- NWSL Championship: 2022
