= Michele Vasconcelos =

American soccer player (born 1994)

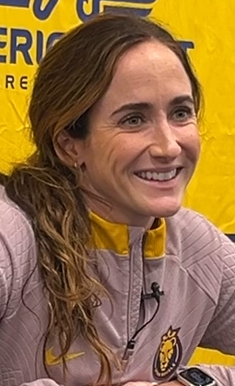
- Vasconcelos with the Utah Royals in 2024

Personal information
- Full name: Jennifer Michele Vasconcelos
- Birth name: Jennifer Michele Murphy
- Date of birth: May 11, 1994 (age 32)
- Place of birth: Sandy, Utah, United States
- Height: 5 ft 5 in (1.65 m)
- Position: Forward

Youth career
- Olympique Montreaux

College career
Years	Team	Apps	(Gls)
2012–2016	BYU Cougars	86	(30)

Senior career*
Years	Team	Apps	(Gls)
2016	Real Salt Lake Women	7	(3)
2018–2020	Chicago Red Stars	31	(3)
2020	Utah Royals	1	(0)
2021	Kansas City	10	(0)
2021–2022	→ Sevilla (loan)	22	(2)
2022–2023	Portland Thorns	5	(1)
2024	Utah Royals	13	(0)

International career
2017	United States U23		
- * Club domestic league appearances and goals as of January 13, 2025

Jennifer Michele Vasconcelos (née Murphy; born May 11, 1994) is an American professional soccer player who most recently played as a forward for the Utah Royals of the National Women's Soccer League (NWSL). She played college soccer for the BYU Cougars and was drafted 11th overall by the Chicago Red Stars in the 2017 NWSL College Draft. She has also played for Kansas City NWSL, Portland Thorns FC, and Spanish club Sevilla.

== Early life and college career ==
Vasconcelos played high school soccer at Alta High School in Sandy, Utah, which won three state championships during her career. She scored a total of 37 goals and recorded 22 assists at Alta High. Vasconcelos also played youth soccer for Sandy-based club Olympique Montreux.

=== BYU Cougars ===
Vasconcelos played NCAA Division I soccer at Brigham Young University, where she scored 30 goals and 27 assists in her career as an attacking midfielder and was named West Coast Conference player of the year in 2016.

== Club career ==
=== Real Salt Lake Women, 2016 ===
Vasconcelos played for Real Salt Lake Women in the United Women's Soccer league during the 2016 season.

=== Chicago Red Stars, 2018–2020 ===
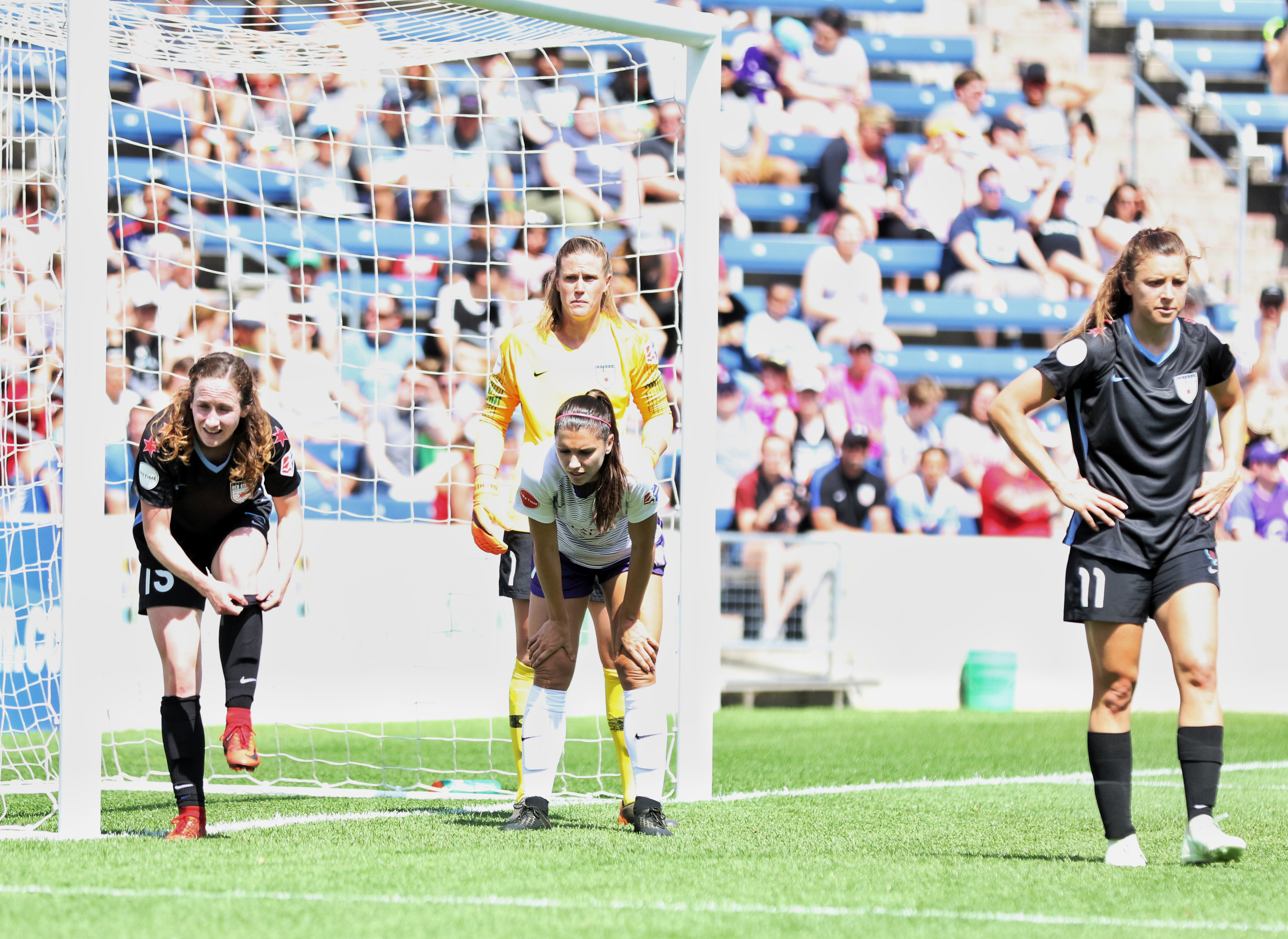
Chicago Red Stars players, 2018

National Women's Soccer League team Chicago Red Stars selected Vasconcelos with the 11th pick in the 2017 NWSL College Draft. She missed the entire 2017 NWSL season as she was pregnant with her first child.

On March 25, 2018, Vasconcelos debuted for Chicago Red Stars in a 1–1 draw against Houston Dash. She appeared in 20 games for the Red Stars in 2018.

In 2019, Vasconcelos appeared in 11 games and scored two goals before tearing her left anterior cruciate ligament in a match on July 6, 2019, against Sky Blue FC. She missed the remainder of the 2019 season.

Vasconcelos appeared in six matches as a substitute for the Red Stars at the 2020 NWSL Challenge Cup.

=== Utah Royals FC, 2020 ===
On September 10, 2020, Utah Royals acquired Vasconcelos from the Red Stars in exchange for $55,000 in allocation money. Vasconcelos requested the trade to be closer to her family.

=== Kansas City NWSL, 2020–2021 ===
On December 7, 2020, ownership of Utah Royals FC was transferred to a group in Kansas City, Kansas. The team was subsequently relaunched as an expansion team and temporarily renamed Kansas City NWSL, and the league transferred all of Royals FC's roster rights to the new club, including Vasconcelos's contract.

On April 26, 2021, Vasconcelos scored the expansion Kansas City team's first home goal at Children's Mercy Park in the 77th minute of a 1-3 loss to Houston Dash in a 2021 NWSL Challenge Cup match.

=== Sevilla FC, 2021–2022 ===
On September 1, 2021, Kansas City loaned Vasconcelos to Sevilla FC of the Spanish Primera División Femenina for one season.

=== Portland Thorns FC, 2022–2023 ===
On July 1, 2022, following Vasconcelos's loan to Sevilla FC, Kansas City waived her NWSL playing rights. Two weeks later, Portland Thorns FC announced that the club had signed Vasconcelos as a national team replacement player. She debuted for Portland on July 16, 2022, as a 78th-minute substitute in a 5–0 win against NJ/NY Gotham FC. On July 29, 2022, Thorns FC extended Vasconcelos's contract to the end of the 2022 season, giving her the opportunity to make three more appearances for Portland.

On January 27, 2023, Thorns FC announced that it had re-signed Vasconcelos to a one-year contract with an option for an additional year. On March 26, 2023, she scored her first goal for Thorns FC in the 76th minute of a 4–0 win against Orlando Pride.

=== Utah Royals, 2024– ===
On November 21, 2023, Utah Royals announced that they had signed Vasconcelos. During the NWSL x Liga MX Femenil Summer Cup, she scored a goal against her former club Portland in a 3–1 victory. After making 13 appearances in her second stint with Utah, Vasconcelos was released on January 13, 2025.

== International career ==
Vasconcelos received a call-up to the United States Under-23 Women's National Team for a training camp in November 2017.

== Personal life ==
Vasconcelos is a member of the Church of Jesus Christ of Latter-day Saints. She married Pedro Vasconcelos in 2014. He was a member of the BYU Cougars men's soccer team. She gave birth to their daughter, Scarlett, in 2017.
