= Marsha's =

Bar in Philadelphia, Pennsylvania, U.S.

- Interactive map of Marsha's

Restaurant information
- Established: 19 September 2025
- Owner: Chivonn Anderson
- Food type: Lesbian bar; "elevated stadium classics"
- Location: 430 South Street, Philadelphia, Pennsylvania, 19147, United States
- Coordinates: 39°56′30″N 75°09′01″W
- Website: marshassouthstreet.com

Marsha's is a queer women's sports bar in Philadelphia, Pennsylvania, founded in 2025 by Chivonn Anderson in partnership with restaurant consultant & chef Trisha Eichelberger. Named after Marsha P. Johnson, the business is the city's first women's sports bar, and is considered a de facto lesbian bar.

The bar is Philadelphia's first fixed establishment centering queer women to open since the closure of Toasted Walnut in 2021, which shuttered due to the insurmountable debts incurred during the COVID-19 pandemic. Marsha's opened after the local LGBTQ+ community saw sustained growth in interest in women-centered queer events (such as Sip City Mixers, which has acted as a "traveling lesbian bar" for the region) and women's sporting events, including calls for a Philadelphia WNBA team and NWSL team, the former of which had come to fruition just months before Marsha's opened.

Marsha's is located in the Queen Village neighborhood of Philadelphia along South Street only two blocks from Val's Lesbian Bar, another Philadelphia lesbian bar which opened only months after. In a rare move, Anderson and Eichelberger were able to acquire both the property and liquor license to the location's previous dive bar, Woolly Mammoth, out of a desire to avoid the various risks and liabilities of leasing a space after challenges with opening Anderson's previous South Street dining venture, Redcrest Kitchen.

== Incidents ==
=== February 2026 compliance inspection ===
On February 20, 2026, Marsha’s South Street was subjected to a multi-agency compliance inspection involving the Philadelphia Police Department, the city's Department of Licenses and Inspections, and the Pennsylvania State Police Bureau of Liquor Control Enforcement. Law enforcement officials stated the action was prompted by multiple anonymous complaints alleging licensing issues and underage service, though authorities subsequently confirmed that no violations were found and no citations were issued.

The scale of the law enforcement presence—which reportedly included over a dozen officers, some in tactical gear—drew immediate condemnation from the LGBTQ+ community. Owner Chivonn Anderson characterized the use of unfounded tips as a targeted attempt to disrupt a Black-owned queer space, describing the experience as "traumatizing." Advocacy groups and local patrons drew parallels between the incident and historical "morality" policing, specifically citing the legacy of former Mayor & Police Commissioner Frank Rizzo as a precedent for the targeting of queer venues and harassment of LGBTQ+ Philadelphians by the Philadelphia Police Department. Critics alleged that the high-visibility enforcement signaled a regression in queer freedom of expression and safe access to nightlife in the city.

=== April 2026 labor and workplace controversy ===
In April 2026, the venue faced community scrutiny following allegations of workplace discrimination and mismanagement voiced by former staff members. Allegations by former manager and bartender Olivia Rhodes, a Black trans woman, included claims of a hostile work environment, racial microaggressions, and transphobia. Rhodes alleged that a white male manager sought to hire more men to increase the venue's "testosterone" and disparaged music by Black artists as "too Black" for the demographic. Seisha Mason, another former staff, also alleged instances of wage theft and retaliatory termination, which were subsequently refuted by the venue.

A spokesperson for the venue contested the claims as "false and misleading" and offered contrary statements to each allegation. Management assert they were justified in calling law enforcement during Rhodes' termination as a response to both alleged trespass and refusal to return company property. In response to the outcry, Philly Black Pride rapidly relocated one of its scheduled events from the venue due to initial community calls for a boycott. Owner Chivonn Anderson announced an internal DEI review to "rebuild trust," while General Manager Ryan Murph quietly announced his immediate departure from the role after being named as a central figure in the allegations.

Each side's handling of the dispute drew varied criticism from the local LGBTQ+ community. Some voiced concerns that disproportionate backlash over unproven allegations initially circulated via social media could lead to a tragic and premature closure of a rare venue intended as a safe space for queer women— particularly following a February 2026 police inspection that was seen as a signal of vulnerability for the LGBTQ+ community's freedom of expression. Conversely, others viewed the allegations as a betrayal of the values of the bar's namesake and have issued calls for restorative justice and accountability.

== See also ==
- LGBTQ culture in Philadelphia
- Women's sports in the United States
- Lesbian Bar Project
- List of lesbian bars
