= A Bar of Their Own =

Women's sports bar in Minneapolis, Minnesota, U.S.

- Interactive map of A Bar of Their Own

Restaurant information
- Established: March 2024
- Location: 2207 East Franklin Ave, Minneapolis, Minnesota, 55404, United States
- Coordinates: 44.96262°N 93.24049°W
- Website: abaroftheirown.com

A Bar of Their Own is a women's sports bar in Minneapolis, Minnesota, United States. It is the first women's sports bar in Minnesota.

== Description ==
Located on East Franklin Ave in the Seward neighborhood of Minneapolis, A Bar of Their Own is an LGBTQ-owned bar focused on women's sports. The menu includes vegan and gluten-free menu items, as well as the "beloved chicken wings" from the site's predecessor, Tracy's Saloon, which was established in 1979. Sixteen of their eighteen beers on tap are owned, made, or led by women, non-binary, or transgender people.

The bar shows exclusively women's sports, from local teams like the Minnesota Lynx, Aurora FC, Minnesota Frost, and Minnesota Strike, to national leagues like the WNBA, college softball, and the Pro Volleyball Federation.

A Bar of Their Own was founded by Mankato native Jillian Hiscock, who said she was inspired by The Sports Bra in Portland, Oregon. It opened in March 2024 in time for the 2024 Big Ten women's basketball tournament which took place in Minneapolis and featured Caitlin Clark. The bar is Minnesota's first ever women's sports bar.

The name plays on the 1992 film A League of Their Own, and the bar features a signed poster from the Rockford Peaches who inspired the movie. The bar keeps a signature wall, which includes signatures from sportswomen like Rebekkah Brunson, Billie Jean King, and Emma Greco.

In 2026, Hiscock received the Special Merit Award at Minnesota's celebration of National Girls & Women in Sports Day in Minnesota for her work with A Bar of Their Own.

== See also ==
- List of bars
