= Rough and Tumble Pub =

Sports bar in Seattle, Washington, U.S.

- Interactive map of Rough and Tumble Pub

Restaurant information
- Location: 5309 22nd Avenue NW, Seattle, Washington, United States
- Coordinates: 47°40′01″N 122°23′06″W
- Website: roughandtumblepub.com

Rough and Tumble Pub is a women's sports bar with two locations in the Seattle, Washington, United States. The original location operates in Ballard. It was the city's first bar dedicated to women's sports. In 2025, the business announced plans to open a second location.

== History ==
In 2025, the business announced plans to open a second location in the space that previously housed Columbia City Ale House. With this opening, Rough and Tumble became the first women's sports bar to have two locations.

== Reception ==
The Infatuation included Rough and Tumble in a 2025 list of Seattle's twelve best sports bars.

== See also ==
- List of bars
- Women's sports in the United States
