= Women's sports in Portland, Oregon =

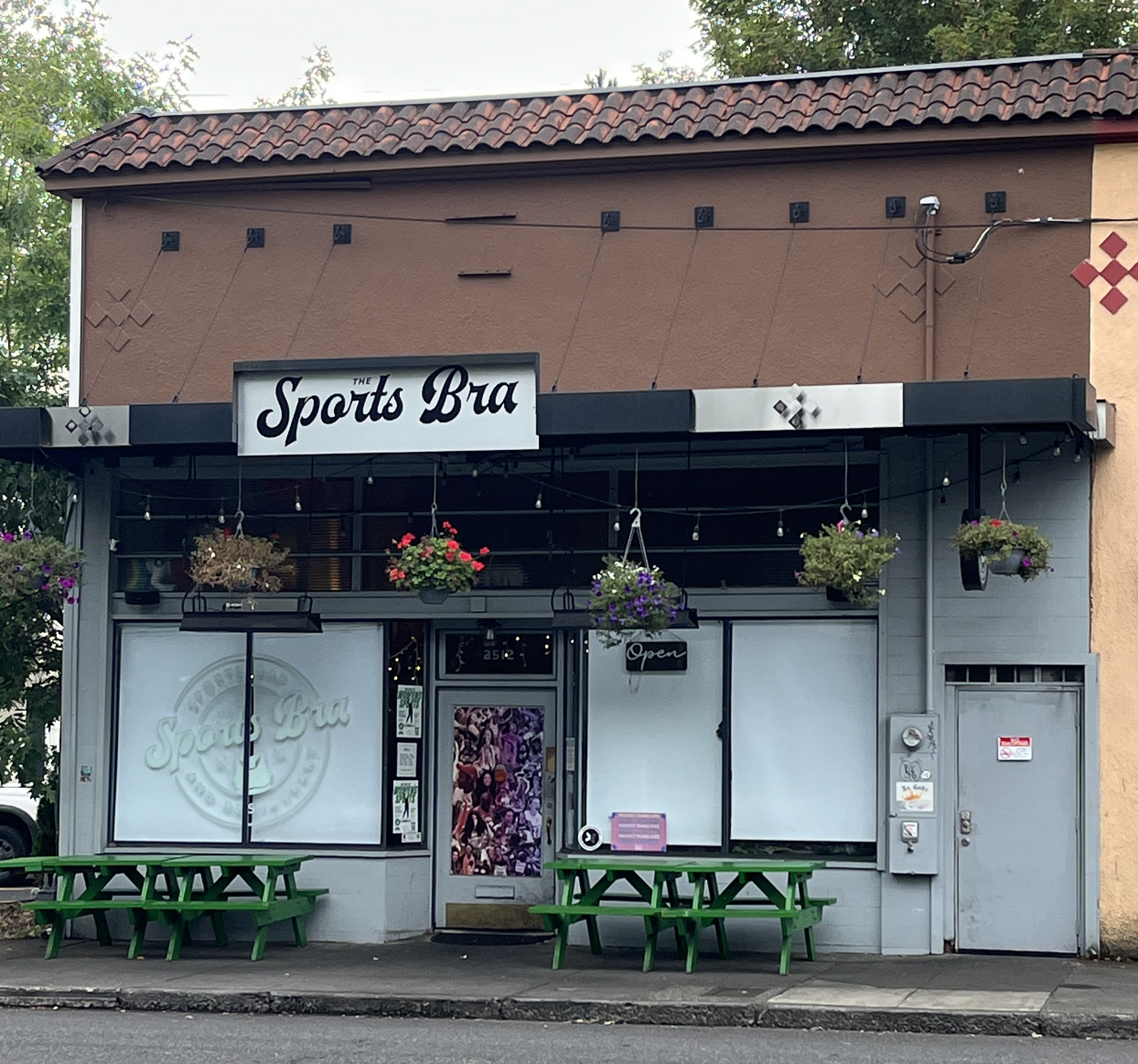
Exterior of The Sports Bra, a women's sports bar in Portland, Oregon, in 2025

The American city of Portland, Oregon has many women's sports teams. In 2024, Inc. magazine said Portland "is well known for its embrace of women's sports". A commissioner for the Women's National Basketball Association has described the city as "an epicenter of women's sports", according to Adweek. In 2025, The Athletic ranked Portland fourth in a list of the nation's top cities for women's sports. Reporting on the ranking, Kale Williams of Axios Portland wrote, "The Rose City has cemented its place in the national pantheon with a long-established culture and some recent additions that make Portland one of the premier destinations for athletes and fans."

== Teams ==
The Rose City Rollers is a women's roller derby league.

The Lavender League is an LGBTQ-friendly soccer league for queer and trans women as well as non-binary people. There were approximately 200 registered players in 2025. Bump, Set, Dyke is an inclusive but primarily lesbian volleyball team. The Portland United Hockey League is for women as well as transgender and non-binary people.

Previously, the Portland Power competed in the American Basketball League and held games at Veterans Memorial Coliseum.

The Portland Rugby Club Grackles are three-time Oregon Rugby State champions, as of 2025. Team members attend various local high schools.

=== University and college sport ===
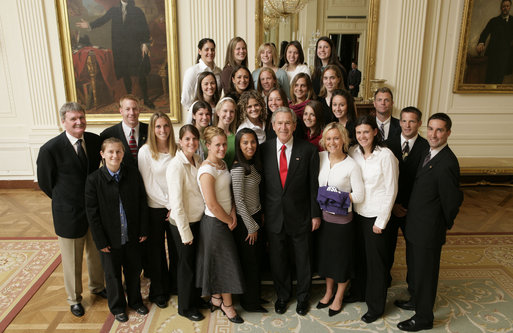
President George W. Bush stands with members of the University of Portland's women's soccer team, 2006, during a photo opportunity with the 2005 and 2006 NCAA Sports Champions

Following are collegiate women's sports teams based in Portland:

- Portland Pilots women's basketball
- Portland Pilots women's soccer
- Portland State Vikings women's basketball
- Portland State Vikings women's tennis

=== Professional sports ===
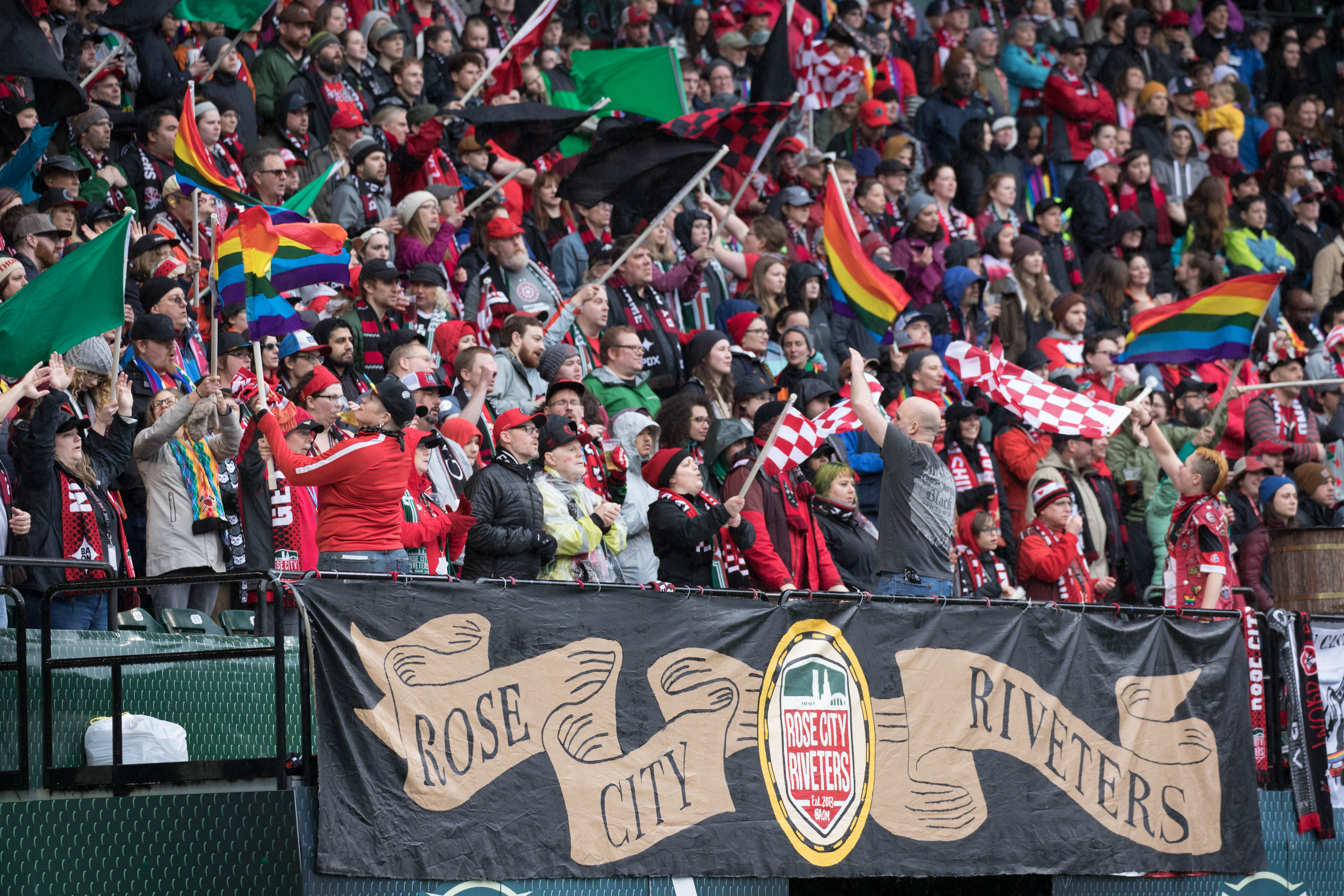
The Rose City Riveters during a match between Portland Thorns FC and Orlando Pride at Providence Park in Portland, Oregon, 2018

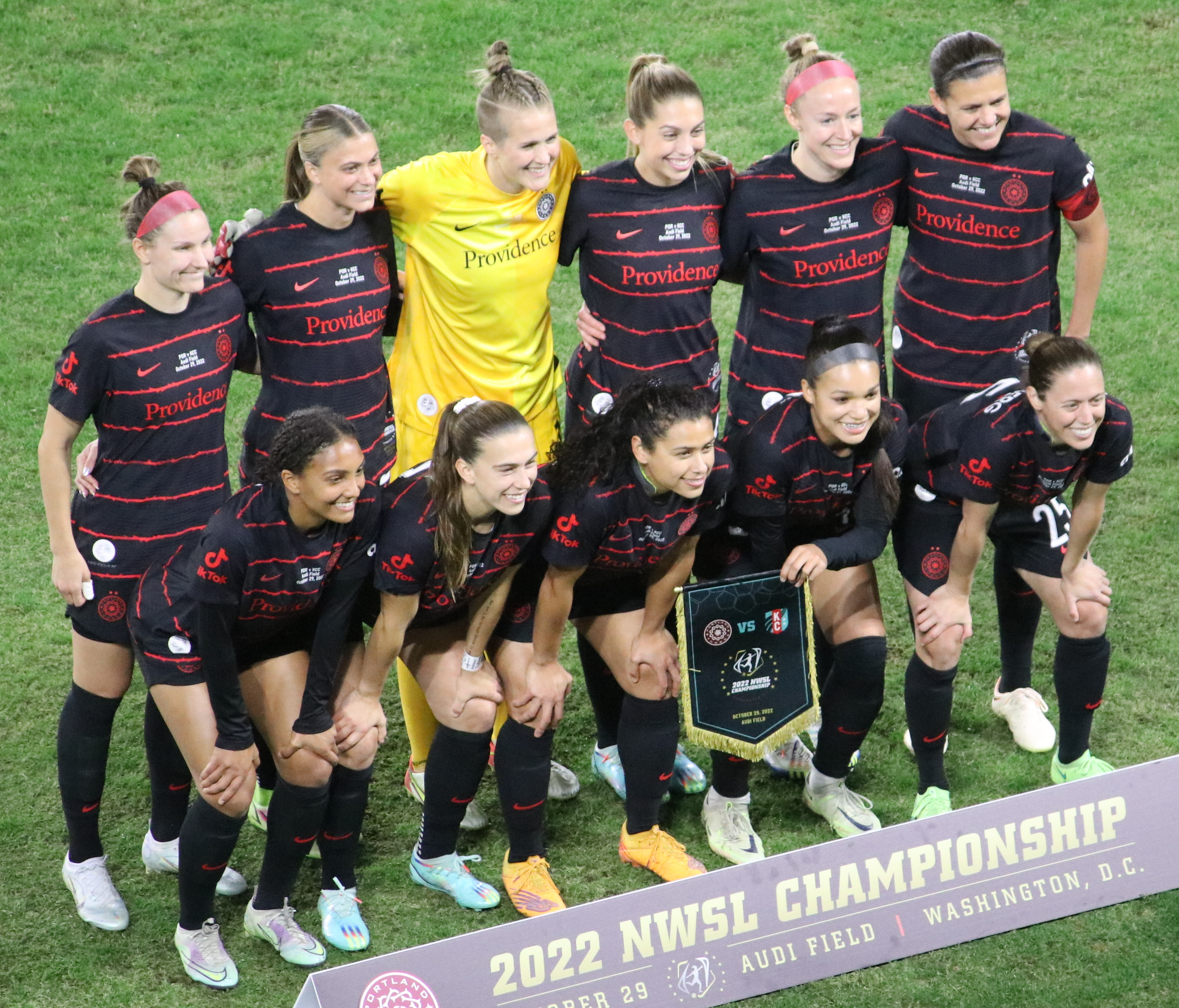
Portland Thorns starters at the 2022 National Women's Soccer League Championship

Following are professional women's sports teams based in Portland:

- Oregon Ravens – Women's National Football Conference
- Oregon Soar – ultimate frisbee
- Portland Cascade – Athletes Unlimited Softball League
- Portland Cherry Bombs FC – USL W League
- Portland Fire – Women's National Basketball Association
- Portland Thorns FC – National Women's Soccer League

The Rose City Riveters is a supporters' group for the Thorns. The group has expressed support for the inclusion of queer and trans women. In 2017, Caitlin Murray of The New York Times said, "In nearly every way, from on-field success to fan support to profitability, the Thorns are a model of sports franchise success. Even if they do not add a second league title on Saturday, there is an argument to be made that the Thorns are the most successful professional women's sports team in the world." Reporting on the team's 2017 National Women's Soccer League championship win, Katelyn Best of Portland Monthly wrote:

One day, we hope, women's soccer will prosper all around the world. Other clubs will sell out stadiums. The stars of women's teams in Latin America and Europe will be household names, with salaries as lavish as those of their male peers. But for now, Portland is unique. For the women who train and play in obscurity in places where the men's game holds world-historical importance, Portland is the promised land.

In 2024, Oregon Public Broadcasting said the return of the Portland Fire "would cement the city's place as a leader in women's sports".

== Culture and events ==
In 2025, Demi Lawrence of Portland Business Journal wrote, "The concept of Portland as the women's sports epicenter has been in the making for decades, but there's been a renewed push in the last few years to put it into motion." The four-day summit Epicenter Week in 2025 focused on promoting women's sports in the city. The second annual event was held in 2026.

The Sports Bra is a women's sports bar. Based in Portland, the Women's Collegiate Softball League launched in 2023. The Portland Trail Blazers' first women's summit was held in 2025.

The inaugural International Women's Sports Film Festival is slated to take place in downtown Portland in May 2026. Featuring films about women and nonbinary athletes, the festival is being spearheaded by Kate Delhagen and Jenny Nguyen of The Sports Bra, as well as Molly King of the LGBTQ+ documentary festival QDoc and Kimiko Matsuda of the Idea Factory.

The 1999 and 2003 FIFA Women's World Cups had games played in Portland.

== See also ==
- Portland Fire (2000–2002)
- Sports in Portland, Oregon
- Women's sports in the United States
