= Whiskey Girl Tavern =

Women's sports bar in Chicago, Illinois, U.S.

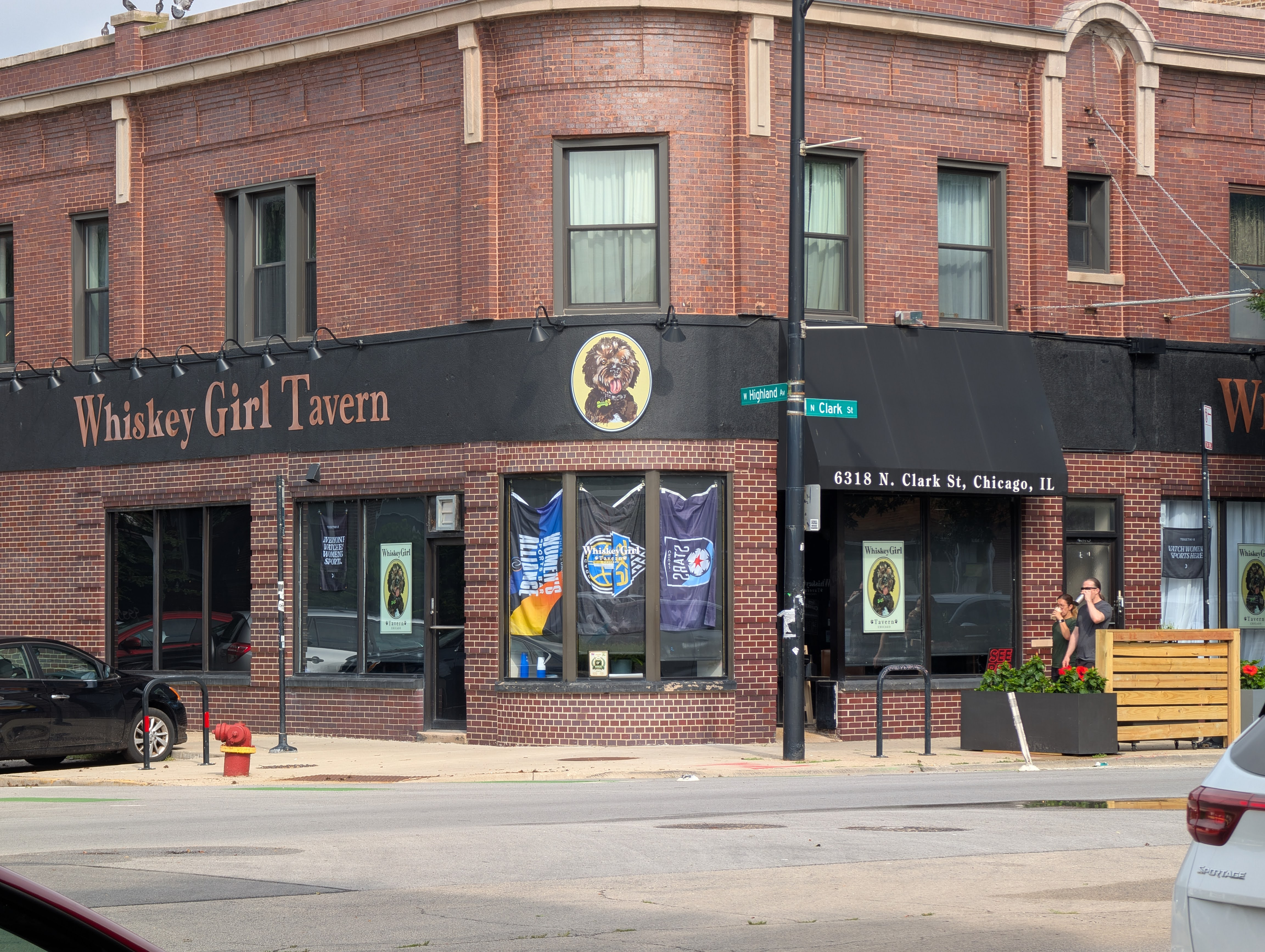
- Whiskey Girl Tavern in 2025
- Interactive map of Whiskey Girl Tavern

Restaurant information
- Established: July 2022
- Owners: Christina and Heather Roberts
- Location: 6318 N Clark St, Chicago, Illinois, 60660, United States
- Coordinates: 41.99710°N 87.67067°W
- Website: whiskeygirltavern.com

Whiskey Girl Tavern is a women's sports bar in the Edgewater neighborhood of Chicago, Illinois. It was founded by Christina and Heather Roberts and opened in July 2022 in the former Pressure Billiards & Cafe space at 6318 North Clark Street.

The tavern regularly screens women's professional and college sports while also showing other competitions, and it hosts watch parties and community events. It was among the first wave of women's sports bars that opened in the United States during 2022.

== History ==
Before opening Whiskey Girl Tavern, Christina Roberts had co-founded Back Lot Bash, an annual Pride event in Andersonville. Their plans for the tavern, reported in March 2022, called for a sports bar and lounge serving food, craft cocktails, and nonalcoholic drinks. The tavern opened in early July with two bars and a performance space intended for game viewing, LGBTQ gatherings, and other community events.

In 2024, WBEZ identified Whiskey Girl Tavern as Chicago's existing women's sports bar while reporting on the growth of similar venues around the United States.

== See also ==
- LGBTQ culture in Chicago
- List of bars
