= Gender in youth sports in the United States =

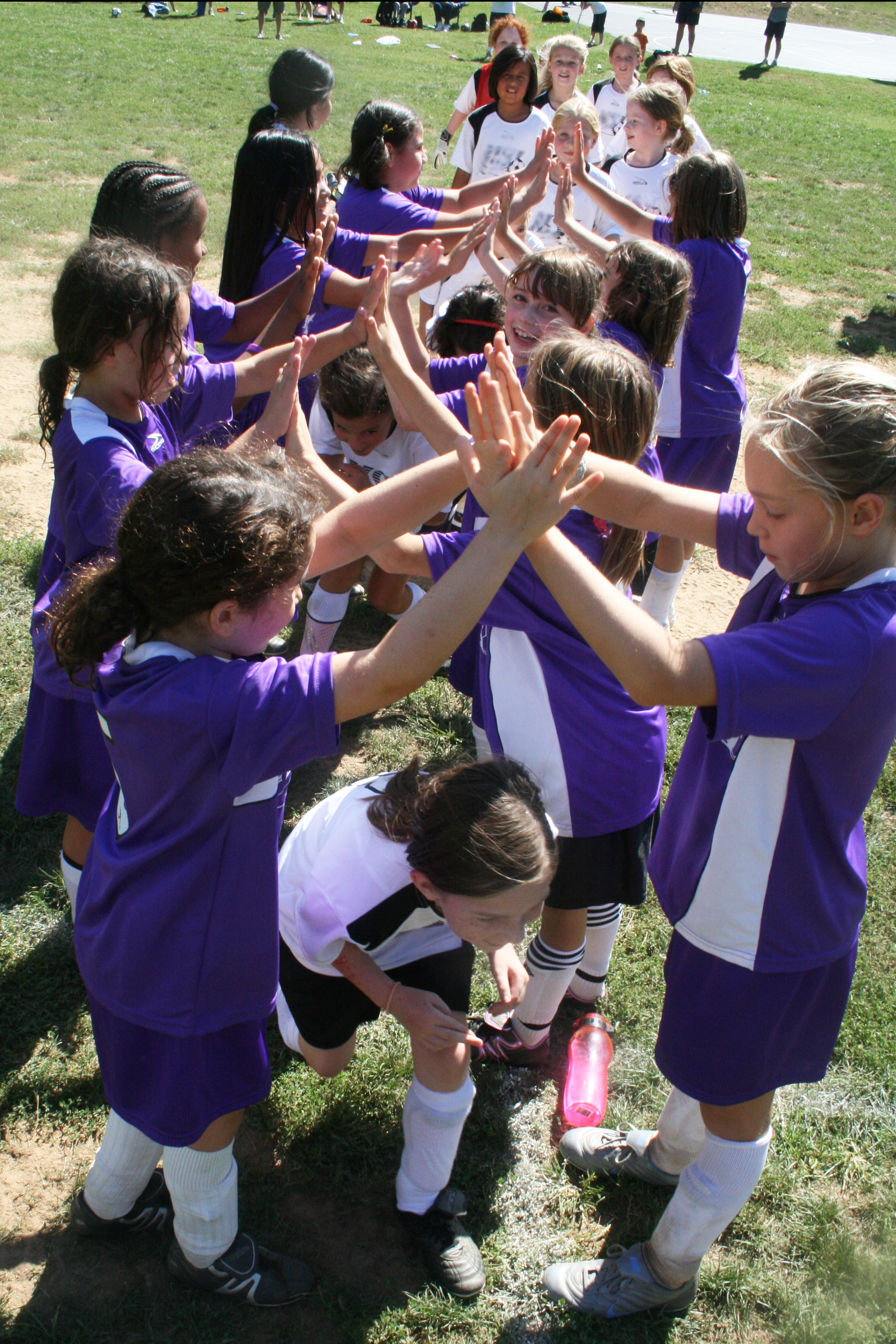
Girls soccer goodbye ritual

Gender in youth sports refers to the role and influence that both young male and females have in sports. The participation of American youth in sports is a matter that is always trying to be improved and appeal to all genders. There are organizations in the United States that are trying to improve the disparity of participation rates between boys and girls. Every sport can be played by both girls and boys.

== Participation rates in youth sports by gender ==
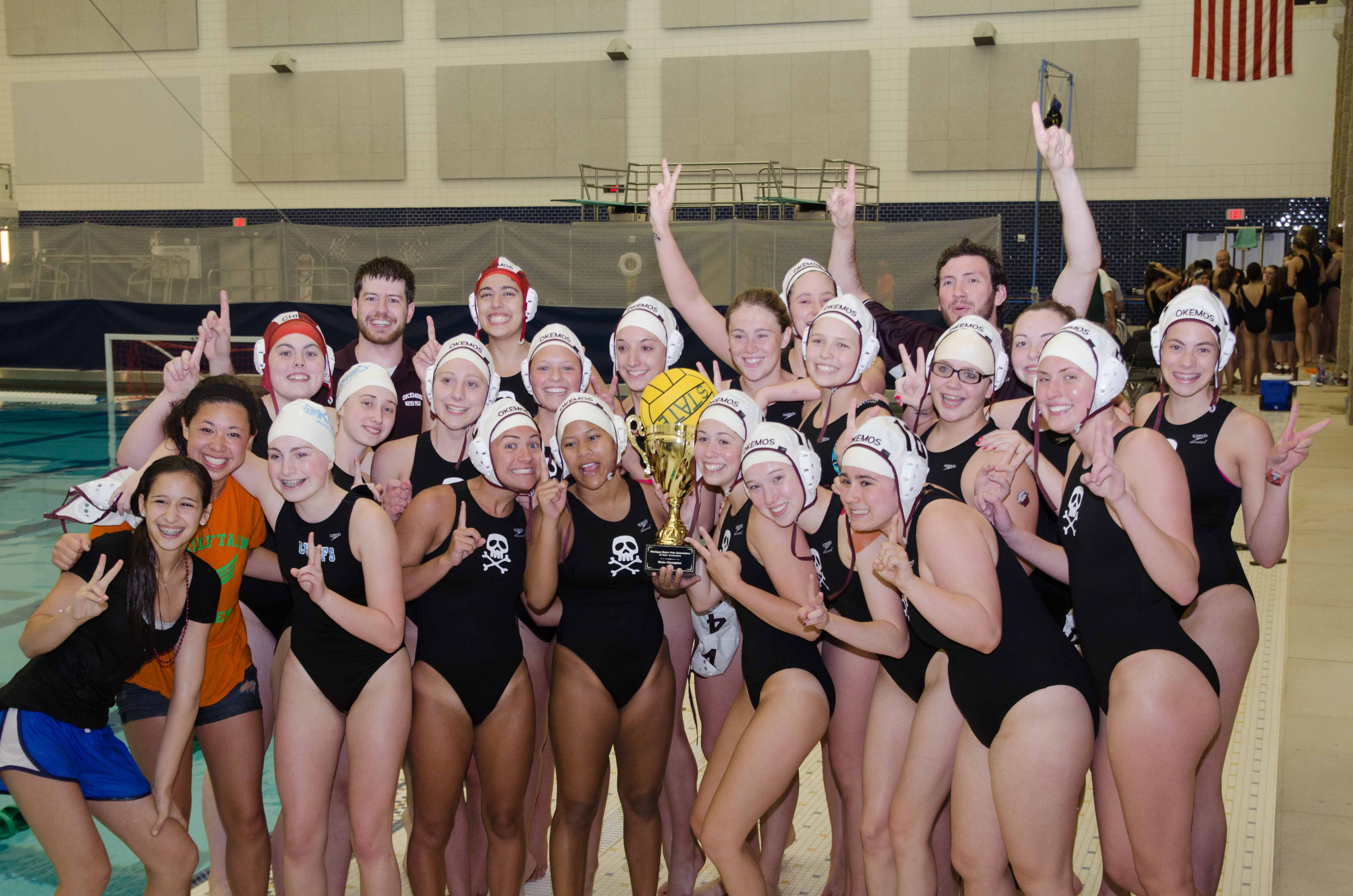
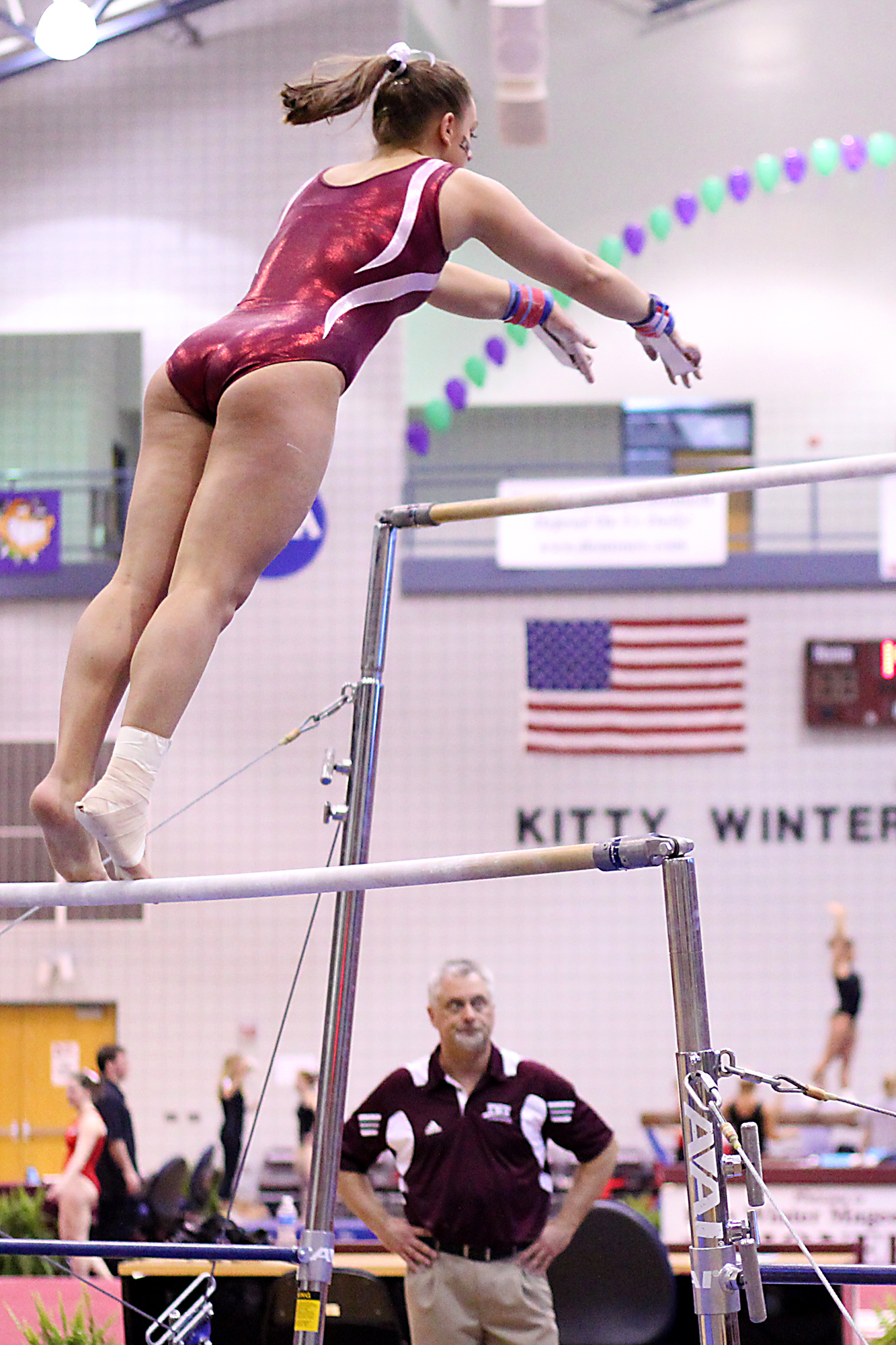
Left: A U.S. high school girls' water polo team (with their male coaches in background) posing with their trophy. Right" A U.S. university girl practising a difficult gymnastics manoeuvre under the watchful eyes of her coach.

In the United States, 54.1% of children 6-17 years of age participate in sports. Of that, the participation rate of boys (56.1%) is higher then that of girls (52.0%). There are more boys participating in sports than girls in urban and suburban areas. Studies on third to fifth grade children found that in urban areas 59% of girls participated in sport compared to the 80% of boys who participated. In suburban areas, 81% of girls compared to 89% of boys involved in youth sports, while in rural areas 73% of girls participated compared to 69% of boys. Gender equality for younger children was better in rural and suburban areas than in urban areas. Young urban girls, especially, have a narrower window of opportunity for becoming involved with sports than their male counterparts and girls from suburban and rural communities. 1 in 4 9^{th} to 12^{th} grade urban girls have never participated in organized or team sports, compared to about 1 in 6 urban boys.

Age and social class contribute to differences in gender participation. Half of low-income parents agreed that their schools and communities were not meeting the needs of girls as much as those of boys (Hessel, 2000). More African-American and Hispanic parents feel schools and communities are failing their daughters. Boys in immigrant families are more likely to play sports than girls are. Nearly a quarter (23%) of children have at least one parent born outside the United States. Compared to boys, girls in immigrant families report lower rates of athletic participation. Many immigrant parents also hold more traditional attitudes toward girls' and boys' interest in sports. However, girls are exploring a wider array of sports and exercise activities than boys do, including traditional, recreational and newly emerging sports such as cheerleading, dance, Double Dutch and volleyball. Boys focus more on traditional sports and exercise activities, which, most often, take the form of organized school and community sports. In short, progress on the gender front in U.S. sports has been made, but it remains uneven, and it is often poor and urban girls who are being left behind.

Youth sports are racially and ethnically diverse. Girls of color are doubly impacted by both gender and race discrimination in sport. 15% percent of all girls and 16% of all boys who participate in sports are African-American. 17% of female athletes and 15% of male athletes are Hispanic, while Asian girls and boys comprise 8% and 12%, respectively, of children who play sports. And yet, proportionally fewer girls of color are involved with sports than white girls. More African-American and Hispanic parents feel schools and communities are failing their daughters. Girls of color are also much more likely than their male counterparts to be non-athletes. The same discrepancies across racial and ethnic groups do not exist among boys.

Sports like soccer, baseball, and basketball are shared by both girls and boys. However, there are still sports still considered "boy sports", such as football and wrestling. More females are involved in sports that were once considered male only sports due to the fact that youth sports organizations such as the National Alliance for Youth Sports have added more mixed gendered opportunities for children over the years (Stiebling 1999). Sport is seen as a status enhancer in school that has led to a difference in participation levels based on factors such as gender, ethnicity, and grade level (Shakib, 2011)

== Gender and sports opportunities ==
The rise of organized sports opportunities for girls has increased dramatically since the passage of Title IX in 1972. During the 1972–73 season, the AIAW offered its first seven national championships which included badminton, basketball, golf, gymnastics, swimming & diving, track & field, and volleyball. By the 1980–81 season, the AIAW national program had grown to 39 championships in 17 different sports with 6,000 women's teams and 960 member institutions (Everhart and Pemberton, 2001). The number of female participants continues to rise as variables such as opportunity for involvement, valuing of sports as part of total development and overall fitness for girls and women has increased. Among the many forms of sexism in sports, perhaps the most pervasive and devastating is the lack of equal opportunities for girls to compete in programs similar to those offered for boys (Seefeldt, V., Ewing, M. E, 1995).

Despite the tremendous gains in sports participation made by girls and women during the last 30 years, there is still a persistent gap in the enrollment figures between males and females. The participation of girls is currently only 39% of the total participation in interscholastic athletics. There has been a slow but steady climb toward equity in the percent of female participants, from 32% of the males' participation in 1973–74 to 63% in 1994–95 (Hessel, 2000). Generally more boys attend PE classes than girls, especially in urban and rural schools. Urban girls are left out when it comes to physical education (PE) in the United States, with 84% report having no PE classes at all in the 11th and 12th grades. Rural girls in the same grades are not far behind with 68% reporting no PE classes. Across the country, young low-income children both girls and boys are underserved with regard to school-based physical education.

Girls' sports have been defined and shaped by "men's values, men's understanding of the world, and men's experiences-all of which suppress the development and expression of female values" (Blinde, 1989). The history and evolution of gendered sports substantiates this statement and provides evidence of gender bias in sports as well as sport culture created and sustained to maintain that bias. Girls have had to adapt within the established male model. Boys continue to receive the bulk of sport participation opportunities, scholarships, and access to better coaching (Everhart and Pemberton, 2001). These gains for boys has resulted in the loss of women's sport culture, therefore merging female sports model into the existing male sport model. The ability for girls to play has led to the reduction of female sport administrative leadership and female coaches.

== Discrimination against trans youth in sports ==
With the passage of Executive Order 14201, many high school and college sports organizations have decided to bar transgender youth (particularly trans girls and other AMAB individuals) from competing in teams congruent with their real genders. This has effectively blocked thousands of children and young adults from the career opportunities associated with professional sports, as well as the friendship building and camaraderie of participation in high school athletics.

As of 2023, LGBQ+ youth that are cisgender, are more likely to compete in sports then transgender and gender expansive youth. 30.4% of cisgender LGBQ+ youth currently play sports, while 19% of transgender and gender-expansive youth currently play sports. Participation in sports has both positive psychological and physical benefits, improving youth's development and way they regulate emotions. By participating in sports, the general population of youth have reported feeling a sense of school belonging. This is important for transgender and gender-nonconforming youth who often feel left out.

Although there are research proven benefits to LGBTQ youth participating in sports, there are also some negative effects. A quarter (24.7%) of LGBTQ youth avoid participating in sports at school because they felt unsafe. Additionally, 11.3% reported school staff or coaches advised against participating in sports because of their identity. Through a study done by Toomey and Russel (2012), they found that heterosexual boys where more likely to participate in youth sports than heterosexual girls and all sexual minority youth. Furthermore, sexual minority girls had a lower participation rate than heterosexual girls and sexual minority boys.

Anti-trans policies worldwide have also led to scrutiny and harassment of cisgender women and girls, and particularly cis women of color, if they're not perceived as "feminine enough", such as the harassment faced by Imane Khelif at the 2024 Summer Olympics.

== Gender gap in physical education ==
The gender gap in physical education: Urban girls are left out when it comes physical education (PE) in the United States, with 84% report having no PE classes at all in the 11th and 12th grades. Rural girls in the same grades are not far behind with 68% reporting no PE classes. Across the country, young low-income children both girls and boys are underserved with regard to school-based physical education. Generally more boys attend PE classes than girls, especially in urban and rural schools.

== Adult gender mentoring in youth sports ==
=== Professional coaching ===
In 1972, more than 90% of women's programs were administered and directed by women. By 1994, less than 21% of those same programs were administered/directed by a female, and by 1999 the percent of female head athletic administrators had dropped to 17.8% (Everhart and Pemberton, 2001). Men began applying for, and getting, women's coaching positions. In 1972, over 90% of the coaches who coached women's sports were female. By 1999, 45.6% of women's sports coaches were female. Coaching opportunities for men in women's sports were increasing significantly. Conversely, the number of female coaches in men's sports has not seen the same growth. About 2% of NCAA men's programs have a female coach at the helm (Everhart and Pemberton, 2001).

=== Volunteer coaching ===
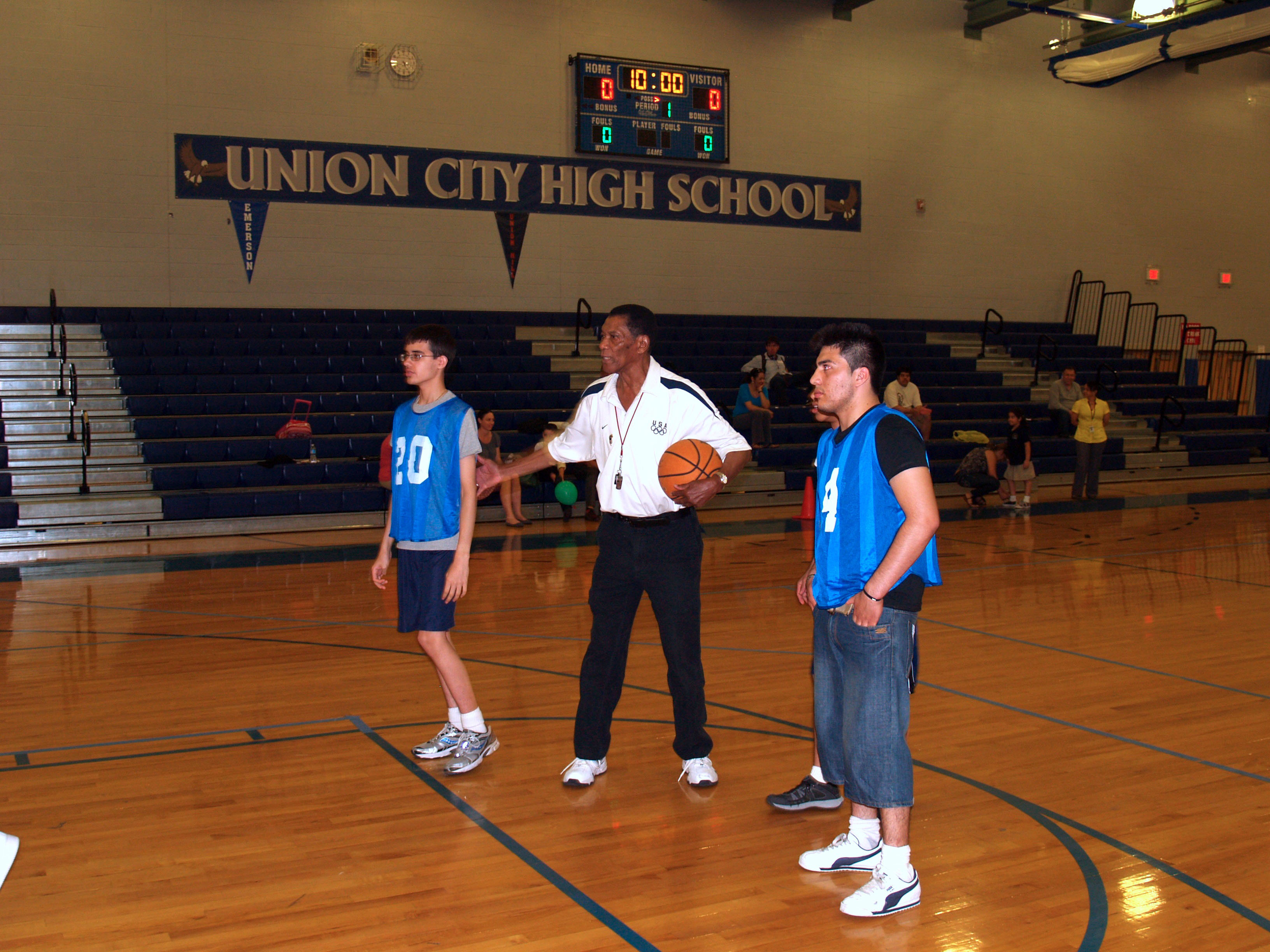

The gendered participation in youth sports is seen not only by the separating of boys and girls, but also in the roles of the adults who are contributing to the teams as volunteers. Messner and Bozada-Deas studied yearbooks from a group of 538 youth baseball and softball teams and 1,490 from the American Youth Soccer Organization (AYSO) in 1999 to 2007. Only 13.4% of the teams had women coaches on the soccer team and only 5.9% of the team's management in baseball and softball were women. Team parents, whose sole duty is to take care of snacks, make phone calls to organize team events, hold fundraising, and providing support for the team players are predominantly filled by women.

=== Responsibility ===
Men prefer not to volunteer for team parent positions due to the responsibilities placed on them compared to those of the coach. Women's roles in sports are to hold the position of team parent, while men are usually head coach or assistant coach. Team parents are often labeled "team mom", making this position more likely for female parents than male parent. (Messner, 2011) The gendered assumption of team parent being called "team mom" and the idea of having a "team dad" is ridiculous and often laughed at. Therefore when given the opportunity to volunteer, more women choose to be team parents, while men will most likely choose to be assistant coaches. For men, coaching involves more masculine tasks, involving leadership over the entire team, setting up games, practices, and trained athletes.

=== Parental involvement in youth sports ===
For girl athletes, the mentors they mentioned in exercise and sports were their coaches and physical education teachers. For boys, dads and coaches topped the list of main mentors. 46% of boys and 28% of girls credit their father for teaching them "the most" about sports and exercise. While mothers and fathers provide similar levels of encouragement and support for both their daughters and sons, many girls may be shortchanged by dads who channel more energy into mentoring their sons than their daughters.
