= Women's sports bar =

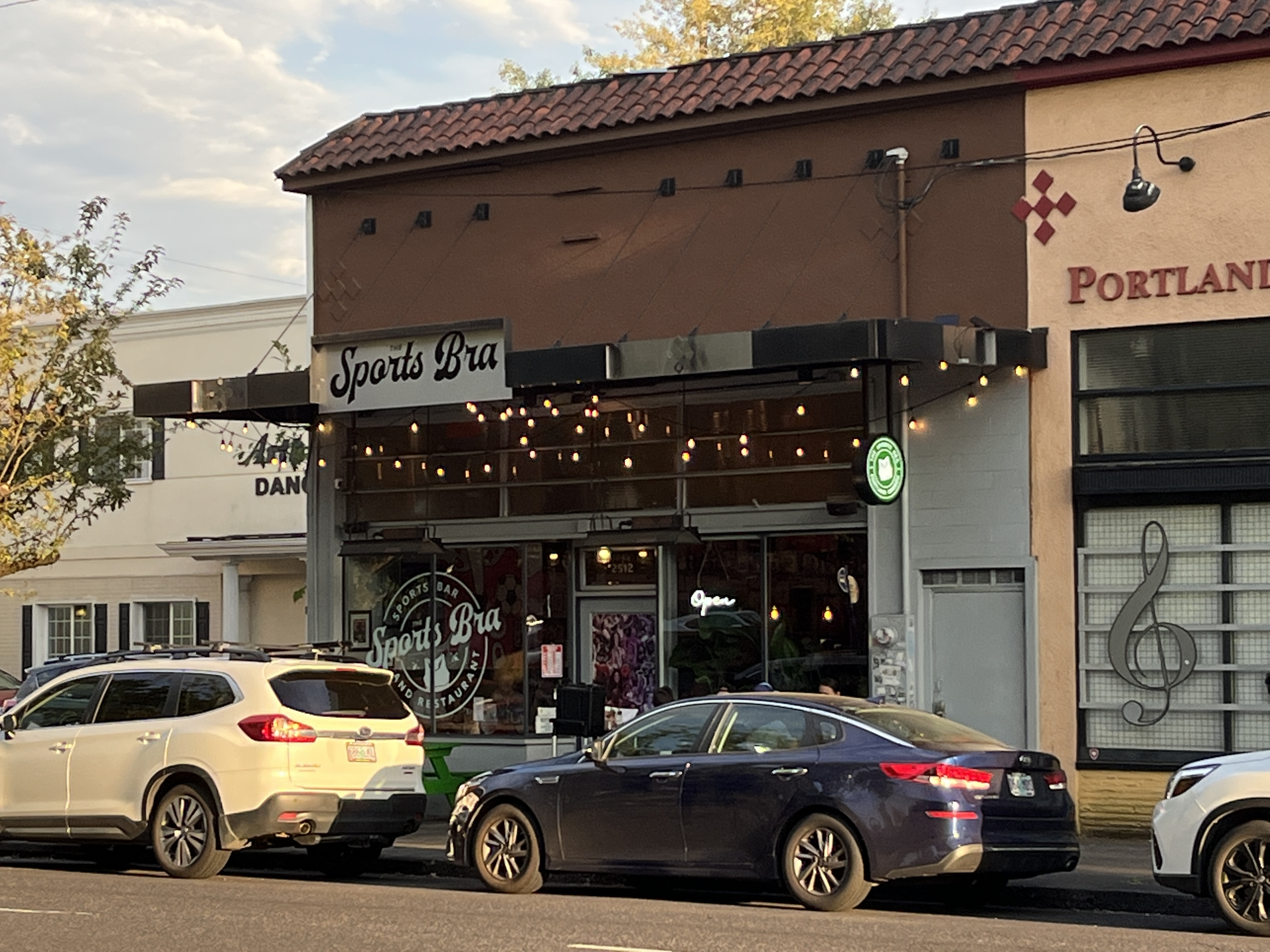
The Sports Bra, Portland, Oregon, U.S., 2022

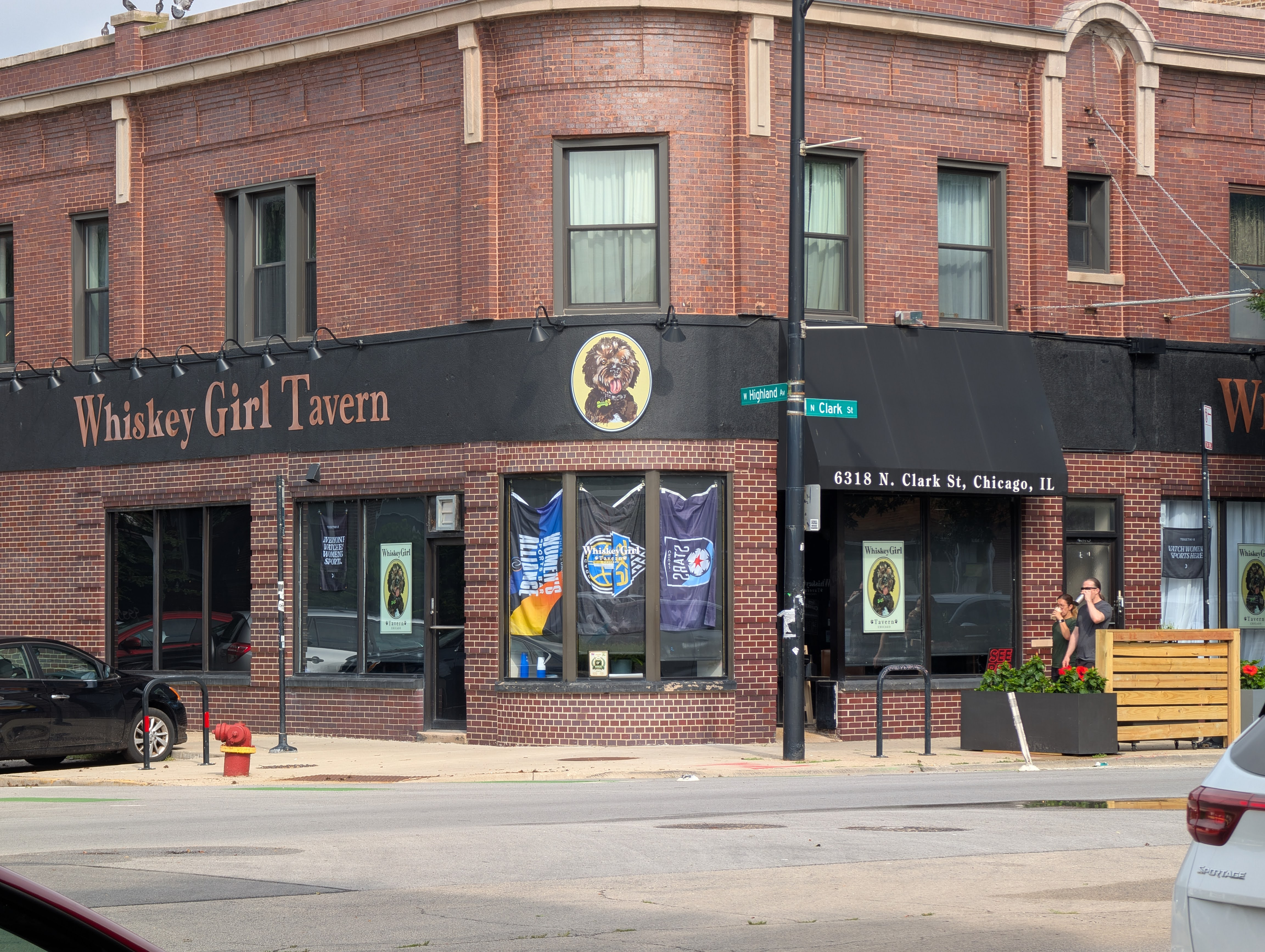
Whiskey Girl Tavern, Chicago, Illinois, U.S.

Women's sports bars are sports bars designed to highlight and promote women's sporting leagues. Women's sports bars have experienced significant growth, particularly within the United States.

The Sports Bra in Portland, Oregon, became the first when it opened its doors in April 2022. Rough and Tumble Pub in Seattle followed suit eight months later. Crossbar, the UK's first bar dedicated to showing women's sports, opened in Brighton in February 2026.

The rise of women's sports bars has been linked to the rise of professional women's sporting leagues and its associated viewership increases.

Other notable women's sports bars include A Bar of Their Own in Minneapolis, Marsha's in Philadelphia, and Whiskey Girl Tavern in Chicago. Other women's sports bars include:

- Athena Keke's, Brooklyn NY
- Drawdown Brewing, Boston MA
- The Dub, Kansas City MO
- The 99ers Sports Bar, Denver CO
- 1972, Austin TX
- Pitch The Baby, Seattle WA
- Rikki's, San Francisco CA
- SET The Bar, Omaha NE
- Side Peace Sports Bar, Houston TX
- Title 9, Pittsburgh PA
- Title 9 Sports Grill, Phoenix AZ
- The W Sports Bar, Cleveland OH
- Watch Me! Sports Bar, Long Beach CA
- Wilka's, New York NY

== See also ==
- Women's sports in the United States
- List of bars
