= Women's sports in the United States =

Women have steadily received more opportunities to participate in sports in the United States over the centuries, with Title IX having played a major role since 1972 in ensuring sex-equal opportunity. Today there are a number of professional women's sport leagues in the United States.

== Participation ==
=== Implementation and regulation of Title IX ===
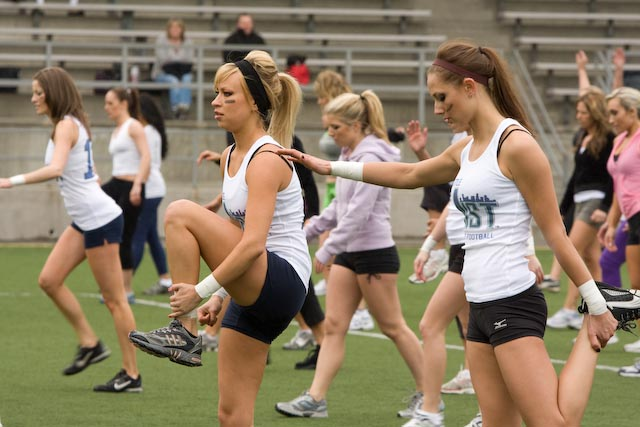
Some players of the X League doing a warming up exercise

In 1972 the United States Congress passed the Title IX legislation as a part of the additional Amendment Act to the 1964 Civil Rights Act. Title IX states that: "no person shall on the basis of sex, be excluded from participating in, be denied benefits of, or be subjected to discrimination under any educational programs or activities receiving federal financial assistance"; Title IX prohibits discrimination based on sex in schools receiving federal funds through grants, scholarships, or other support for students. The law states that federal funds can be withdrawn from a school engaging in intentional sex-based discrimination in the provision of curriculum, counseling, academic support, or general educational opportunities.

Contrary to popular belief, Title IX initially had nothing to do with sports and would not include interscholastic or varsity sports until later. Today the law from the Education Act requires that both male and female athletes have equal facilities and equal benefits. The equal benefits are considered necessities such as equal equipment, uniforms, supplies, training, practice, quality in coaches and opponents, awards, cheerleaders and bands at the game.

A stadium screen depicting the Dallas Cowboys Cheerleaders

Important changes regarding athletics and sport occurred in 1975:

In 1975, the Department of Health, Education, and Welfare's Office for Civil Rights (OCR) published a Title IX regulation that required institutions sponsoring athletic programs to provide equal athletic opportunities for students by accommodating both sexes' athletic interests and abilities.

In 1979, there was a policy interpretation that offered three ways in which schools could be compliant with Title IX in regards to athletics and sport; it became known as the "three-part test".

1. Providing athletic participation opportunities that are substantially proportionate to the student enrollment. This prong of the test is satisfied when participation opportunities for women and men are "substantially proportionate" to their respective undergraduate enrollment.
2. Demonstrating a continual expansion of athletic opportunities for the underrepresented sex. This prong of the test is satisfied when an institution has a history and continuing practice of program expansion that is responsive to the developing interests and abilities of the underrepresented sex (typically female).
3. Accommodating the interest and ability of the underrepresented sex. This prong of the test is satisfied when an institution is meeting the interests and abilities of its female students even where there are disproportionately fewer females than males participating in sports.

Schools only have to be compliant with one of the three prongs.

==== Compliance standards ====
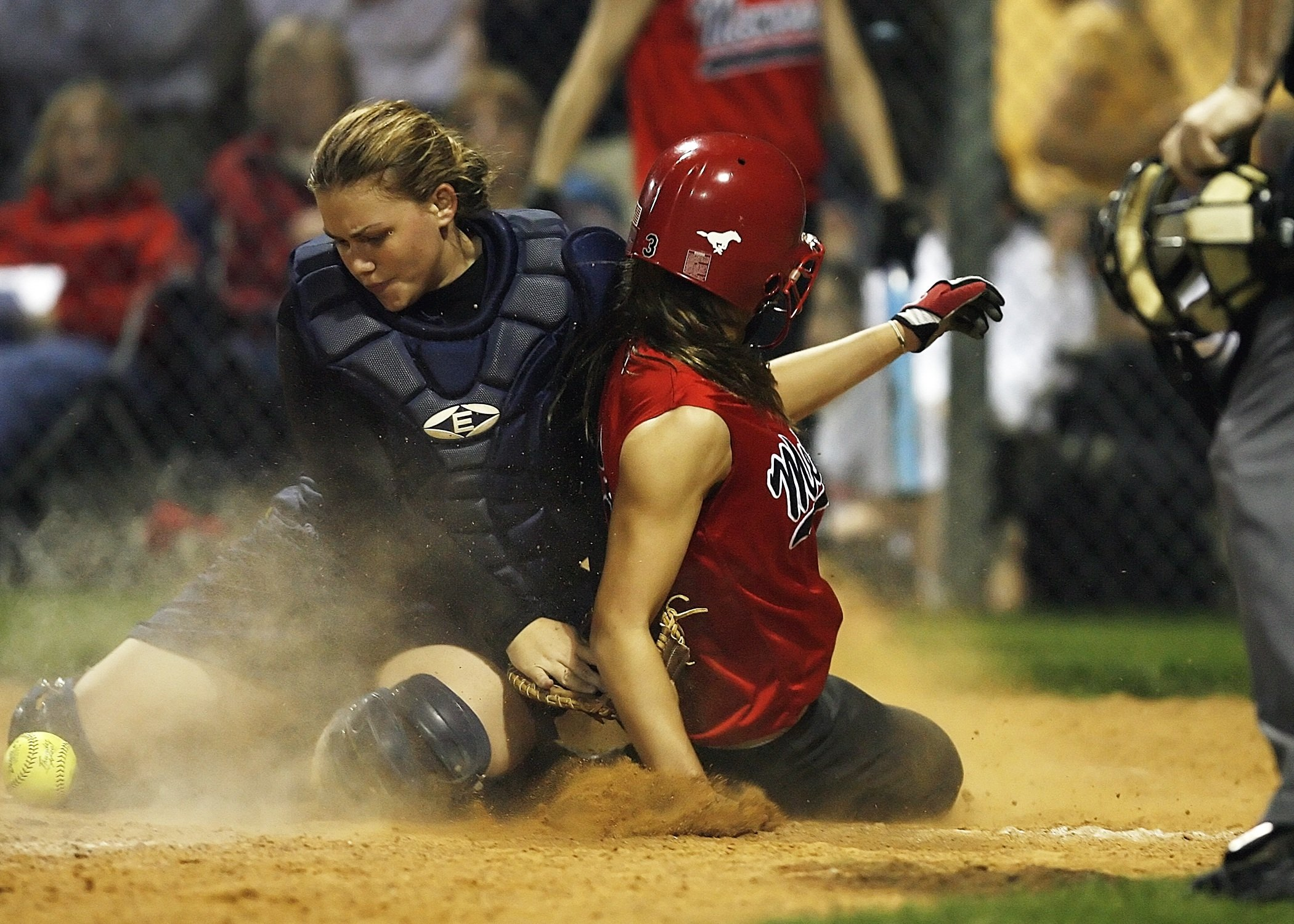
Softball home plate collision

A 1999 study by Sigelman and Wahlbeck found many schools were "nowhere near compliance". Many schools attempt to achieve compliance through the first prong; however, in order to achieve that compliance schools cut men's programs, which is not the way the OCR wanted compliance achieved. Equity is not the only way to be compliant with Title IX; athletic departments need to show that they are making efforts to achieve parity in participation, treatment, and athletic financial assistance.

According to research done by the National Women's Law Center in 2011, 4500 public high schools across the nation exhibited high rates of gender inequality and were considered to be in violation of the Title IX laws. Further research done by the Women's Law Center in 2017 found schools with a high number of minority students and a higher number of people of color, mainly found in the southern American states, had a much higher rate of gender disparity. A large disparity gap regarding sport-related scholarships for women and men, with men getting 190 million more in funding than women, was also found. Despite an increase in participation in sports by girls and women, this pattern persists. Most colleges focus on their male athletics teams and invest more money into those already successful programs. This disparity is presented by some feminist ideologues as a phenomenon illustrating a cause and effect link between race and gender, and how it plays a significant role in the hierarchy of sports.

==== Effect of Title IX on women's sports ====
It is widely believed that Title IX has had a positive effect on women's sports in America and aided their participation. American female athletes now have grounds to help support the stance that women athletes deserve a higher level of respect and consideration that is necessary in order for their participation. Women's involvement in sports has helped raise the recognition of their sports programs and competitive athletes to a level comparable to that which men have enjoyed for many years.

While the mandate did not immediately go into effect it had been publicized to such an extent that it enabled the general public to sense its future implications. There had been great anticipation for the bill prior to its passage which helped it gain media coverage in time for when the bill was mandated to be followed.

=== Post Title IX ===
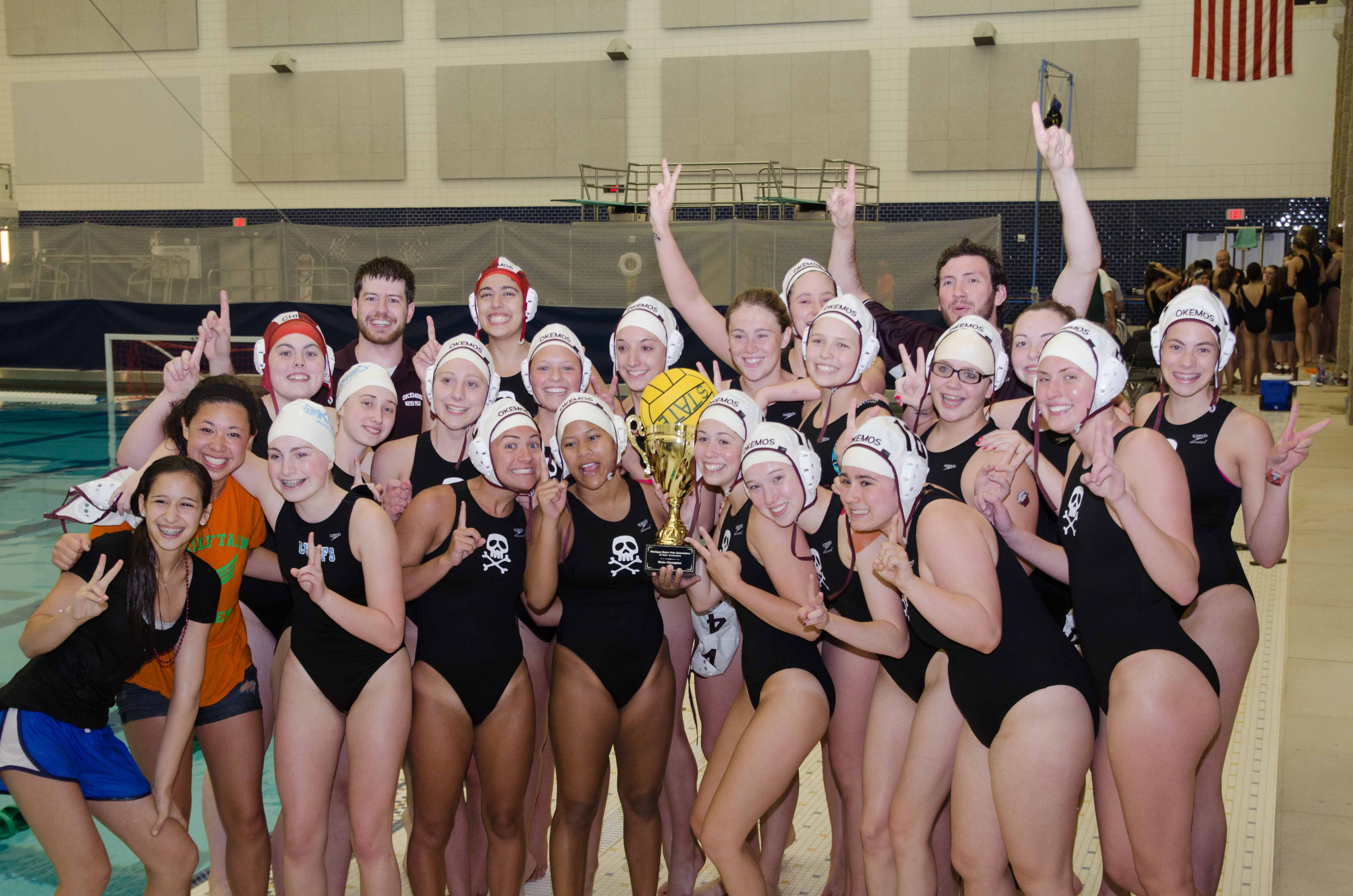
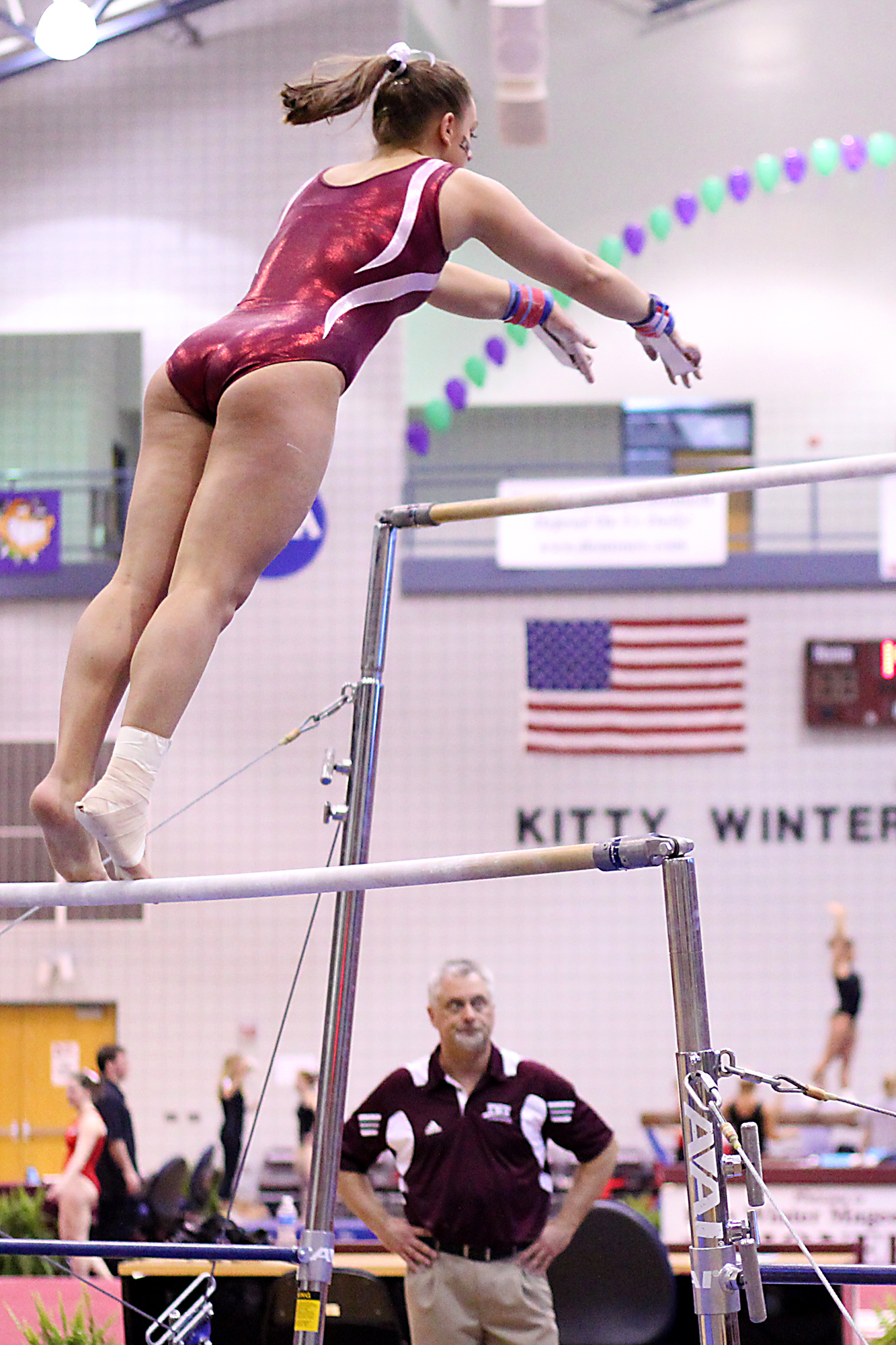
Women's sports is given very high priority in U.S. from school itself. Picture on left shows a U.S. high school girls' water polo team (with their male coaches in background) posing with their trophy. Picture on right shows a U.S. university girl practising a difficult gymnastics manoeuvre under the watchful eyes of her coach.

The involvement in women's sports spiked after Title IX was put into place, mostly in high school level sports as well as collegiate. Title IX's effect on women in sport was observed to have far reaching implications that were not restricted to those who were participating in a professional or intermediate way. Girls and women who did not see themselves in a more "serious athlete" light felt increasingly empowered to participate and compete.

The bill allowed for the equal treatment of female athletes to become a part of the larger sports institution and culture and is considered to have played an important role in increasing the popular view in America that female participation and competition in sport was a valid part of society and life. Although a lot has changed since the implementation of Title IX, high school girls still remain to have less access to sports opportunities than males did in 1972. On a college basis as well, female athletes are receiving significantly lower amounts in athletic scholarships compared to their male counterparts with a notable gap of $252 million.

==== Threats to Title IX's Equal Protection ====
Map of US laws regarding transgender athletes

With the passage of Executive Order 14201 on February 5th, 2025, transgender athletes nationwide have been targeted for participating in their respective sports. Institutions and teams which have continued to allow transfeminine athletes are placed at risk of losing federal funds.

Additionally, many U.S. states ban transgender women from participation completely.

Another threat to Title IX's Equal Protection is NIL. Recently with the new Name, Image, and Likeness (NIL) laws the disparity between men's and women's sports has grown significantly. The NIL rules have led to the NCAA striking and agreement with the Power 4 (P4) conferences to allow revenue sharing between the athletic programs and the athlete's. These athletic programs can pay up $20.5 million in NIL deals to the athletes. These payments will not be split up evenly between men and women. Most of the money is being put towards the sports that make the programs the most revenue, football and men's basketball. Some schools are putting 75% of the money towards football. This is a direct violation of Title IX.

Others argue that if revenue sharing is the true goal, Title IX should not apply because it's about sharing the money with the sports that generate revenue. The NIL deals are not scholarships or aid. They are given out based on what the athletic programs believe you are worth.

=== Statistics ===
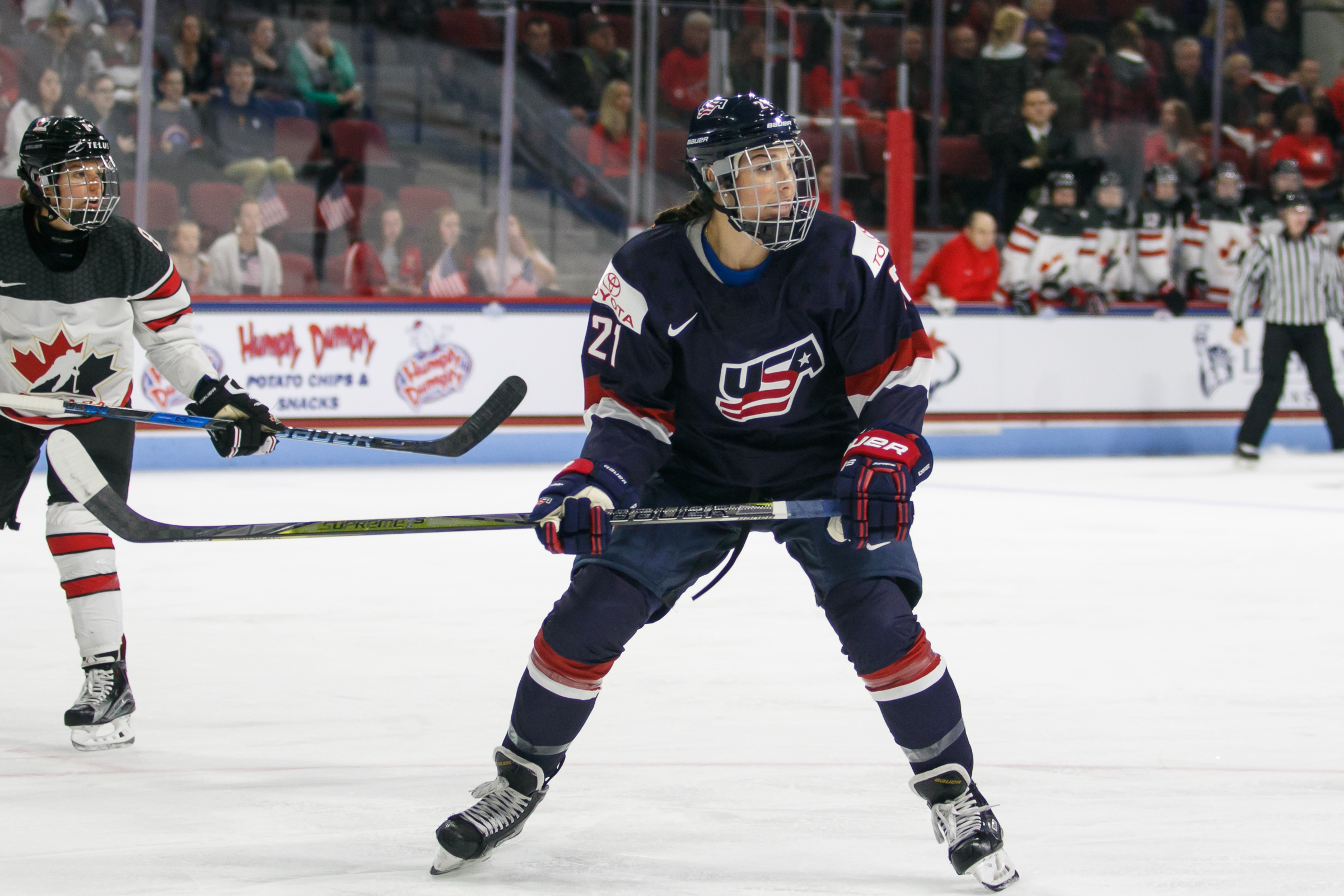
American women's ice hockey player, Hilary Knight. Women's ice hockey is a variant of men's ice hockey, one of the most expensive sports to play in North America and rare: one among only 4 ice skating team sports worldwide.

Title IX is American law. The purpose of the Title IX of the Educational Amendments of 1972 was to update Title VII of the Civil Rights Act of 1964, which banned several forms of discrimination in employment but did not address or mention discrimination in education. Contrary to popular belief, the creation of Title IX had nothing to do with sports. Women's sports were not considered a relevant issue within educational organizations at the time. It was not until later that Title IX involved a new objective to ensure equal treatment in organized sports and schools regardless of sex, in a federally funded program. However, Title IX is most commonly associated with its impact on American athletics and more specifically the impact it has had on women's participation in athletics at every age.

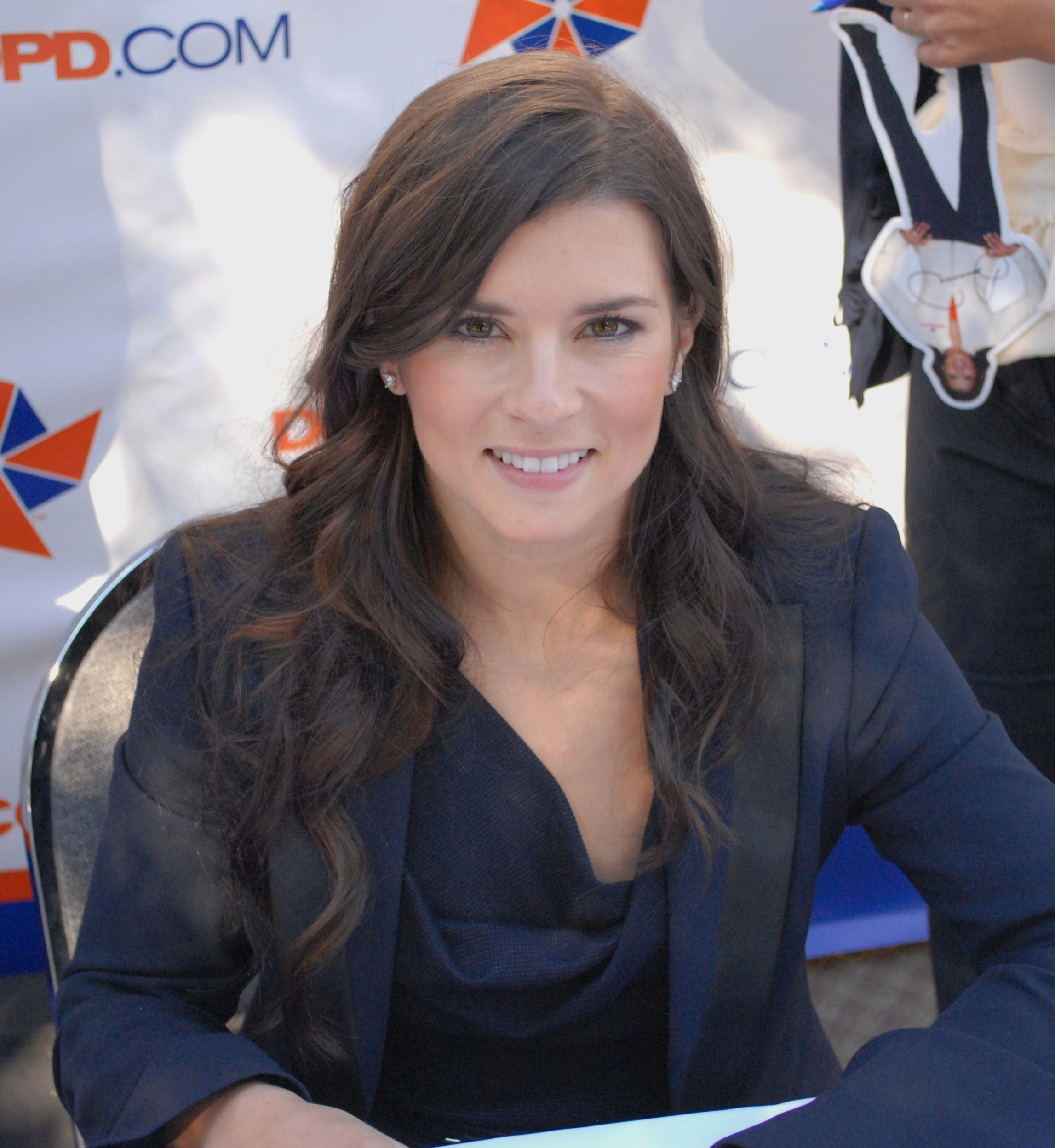
Professional racing driver Danica Patrick in 2010

Since Title IX became law, records have illustrated an increasing number of opportunities in American educational institutions in a variety of sports for women and girls. As of the 2007–2008 school year, females made up 41% of the participants in college athletics. In 1971–1972 there were 294,015 females participating in high school athletics and in 2007–2008 there were over three million females participating, a 940% increase in female participation in high school athletics. In 1971–1972 there were 29,972 females participating in college athletics and in 2007–2008 there were 166,728 females participating, a 456% increase in female participation in college athletics. In 1971, less than 300,000 females played in high school sports. After the law was passed many females started to get involved in sports. By 1990, eighteen years later, 1.9 million female high school students were playing sports.

American studies have investigated whether or not there is a strong correlation between female participation in sport and positive outcomes in women's education and employment later on in life. A 2010 study found that the changes set in motion by Title IX explained about 20 percent of the increase in women's education and about 40 percent of the rise in employment for 25-to-34-year-old women. This is not to say that all women who are successful later on in life played sports, but it is saying that women who did participate in athletics received benefits in their education and employment later on in life.

In 1971, fewer than 295,000 girls participated in high school varsity athletics, accounting for just 7 percent of all varsity athletes; in 2001, that number leaped to 2.8 million, or 41.5 percent of all varsity athletes, according to the National Coalition for Women and Girls in Education. In 1966, 16,000 females competed in intercollegiate athletics. By 2001, that number jumped to more than 150,000, accounting for 43 percent of all college athletes. In addition, a 2008 study of intercollegiate athletics showed that women's collegiate sports had grown to 9,101 teams, or 8.65 per school. The five most frequently offered college sports for women in America are, in order: (1) basketball, 98.8% of schools have a team, (2) volleyball, 95.7%, (3) soccer, 92.0%, (4) cross country, 90.8%, and (5) softball, 89.2%. Since 1972, women have also competed in the traditional male sports of wrestling, weightlifting, rugby, and boxing. An article in the New York Times reported lasting benefits for women from Title IX, citing a correlation between participation in sports and increased educational opportunities as well as employment opportunities for girls. Furthermore, the athletic participation by girls and women spurred by Title IX was associated with lower obesity rates while other public health program failed to claim similar success.

=== Participation in leadership roles ===
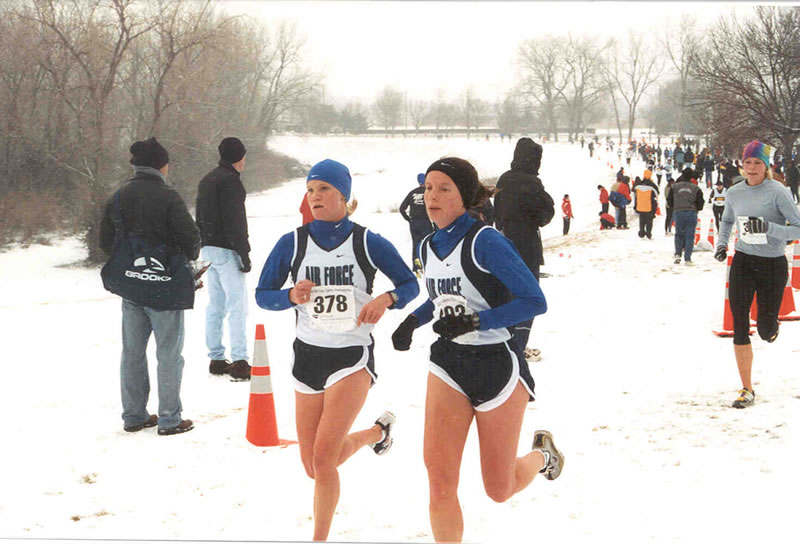
U.S. Air Force women personnel do a cross-country run on snow, 2004.

Although female participation in sports has increased due to Title IX, there has not been a similar effect in terms of women holding coaching or other managerial positions in sports. Most sport teams or institutions, regardless of gender, are managed by male coaches and managers. For example, according to 2016 data, 33% of WNBA teams are led by women coaches or managers. The International Olympic Committee also consists of 20% female members. The data presented also showed that 15% of athletic directors in colleges nationwide were females, and that number is much less in the southern states. There are various reasons that have been suggested to account for this trend. Messner and Bozada-Deas (2009) suggest traditional gender roles may play a role and that society's historical division of labor leads to men volunteering as team coaches and women volunteering as team "moms". Everhart and Chelladurai (1998) show that this phenomenon may be part of a larger cycle --- girls who are coached by men growing up are less likely to view themselves as coaches when they are adults, and so the number of female coaches decreases, meaning more girls are coached by men.

== Media coverage ==
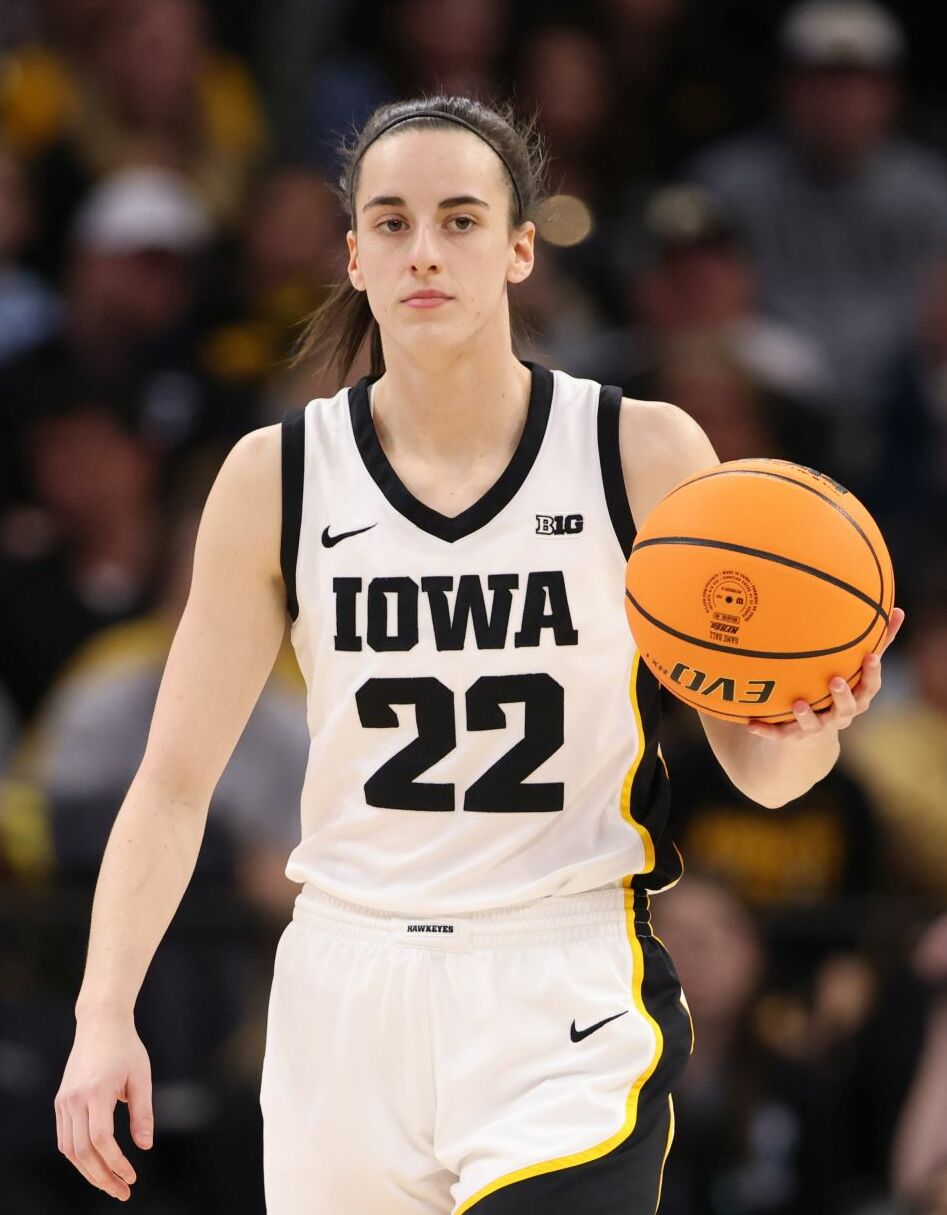
Former Iowa women's basketball player, Caitlin Clark

Women's sports media coverage is significantly less than men's sports in the United States. According to a study at Purdue University that looked at the difference in women's sports coverage from 1989-2019, women's sports live television air time only went up from 5% in 1989 to 5.4% in 2019. Other studies have come to find that 4% of the air time on ESPN was women's sports. The women's sports segments tend to be way shorter, and they do not have the same in deep analysis that the men's sports do. This is a massive disparity considering that women make up 239,341 of the 555,538 total NCAA athletes. Some may think this is happening because less people follow women's sports than they do men's sports, but the gap is much smaller than most people believe it to be. A study in 2025 showed that 21% of people follow women's college sports, and 31% of people follow mens college sports.

== Professional sports ==
Though women have been pro athletes in the United States since the early 1900s, paid teams and leagues are still uncommon and, as of 2013, female athletes are paid far less than their male counterparts. For instance, the WNBA had its first season in 1997, 51 years after the inception of the men's NBA. The WNBA (under the NBA Board of Governors) pays the top women's players less than 1% of the salary that the top men's players are capable of earning; in 2021, the maximum salary for any WNBA player was $221,450, while the maximum NBA salary was $38,199,000. In 2005, the WNBA team salary cap was $0.673 million; by 2021, this amount had nearly doubled to $1.339 million. However, during this period, the NBA's cap more than doubled, from $43.87 million in 2005 to $109.14 million in 2021.

The Women's United Soccer Association became the first American women's pro league in 2001, but lasted only briefly because of financial sponsorship. Fans enjoyed women's pro soccer for three seasons before executives announced the suspension of the league, despite the women's national soccer team (USWNT) rating it as one of the world's top teams. The absence of a Women's professional football (soccer) league in the United States made it difficult for the USWNT to find new players until Women's Professional Soccer was founded. A 2004 effort to revive the WUSA was launched. On September 4, 2007, a new North American women's professional football league, tentatively named Women's Soccer LLC, was announced, and ultimately launched in 2009 as Women's Professional Soccer. That league folded after its 2012 season, with the current National Women's Soccer League established later that year and beginning play in 2013.

=== Soccer ===
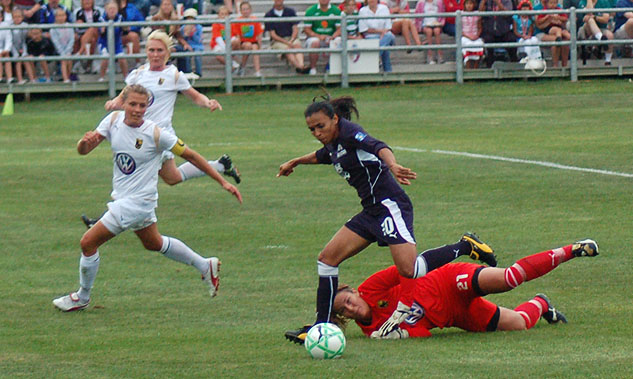
Marta Vieira da Silva in a 2009 Women's Professional Soccer (WPS) All-Stars match against Umeå IK.

The Women's Professional Soccer league, formed in September 2007, began its league play in March 2009. In its final season in 2011, there were six teams in the eastern United States. The WPS canceled the 2012 season when the number of teams dropped to five after Dan Borislow's team in South Florida, magicJack, was terminated by the league. The WPS hoped to continue the season in 2013 with at least six teams and eight in the 2014 season, but ultimately folded in May 2012 because of legal and financial troubles.

In November 2012, the US, Mexican, and Canadian soccer federations announced the establishment of the National Women's Soccer League, which began to play in 2013. The US and Canadian federations remain involved with the NWSL; the Mexican federation withdrew after establishing Liga MX Femenil in 2016.

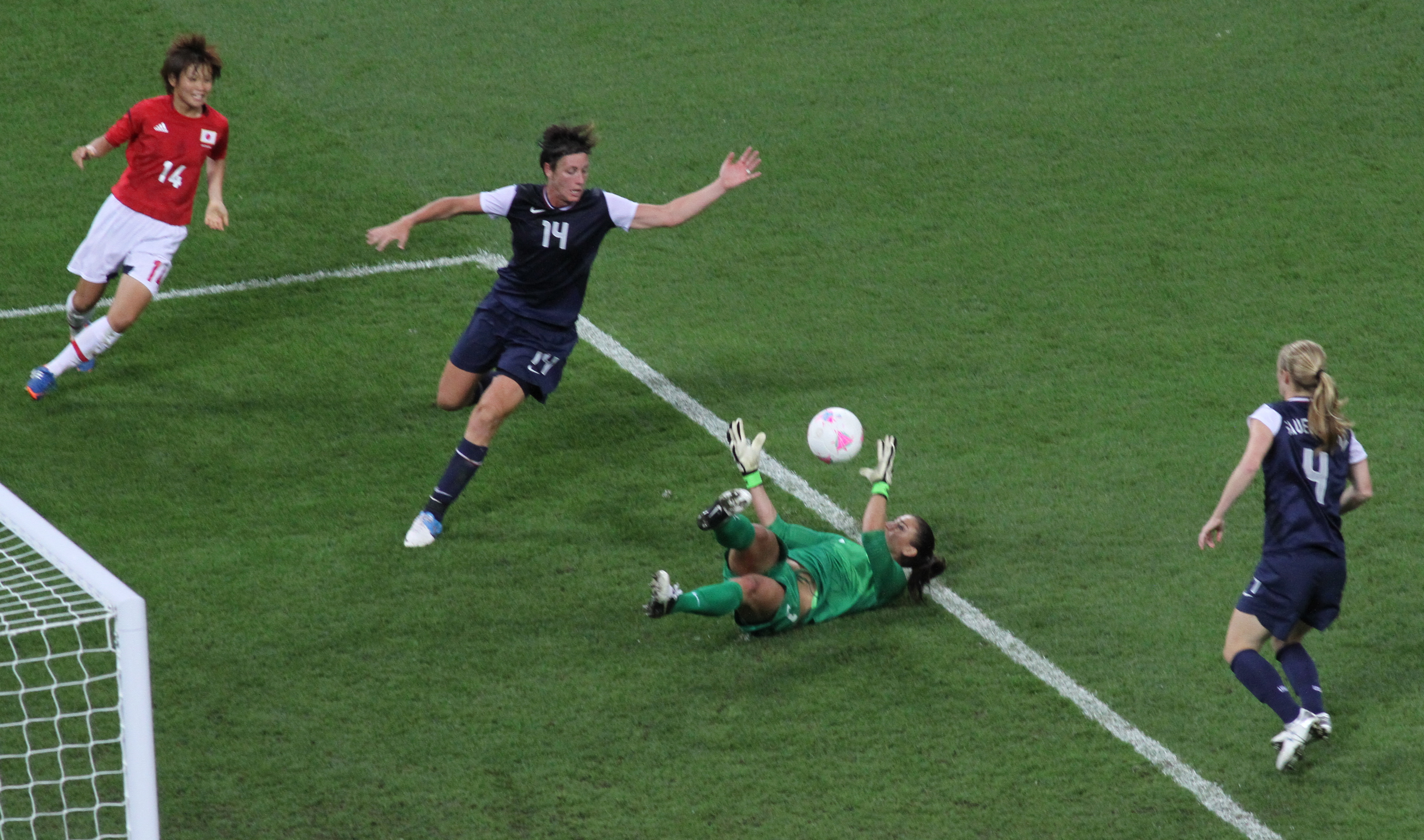
Gold medal match in 2012 London Olympics. Left to right: Asuna Tanaka-14, Abby Wambach-14, Hope Solo-1, Becky Sauerbrunn-4

The National Women's Soccer team saw the loss of the Boston Breakers in January 2018. The Boston Breakers were one of the earliest women's professional teams starting in 2000 under the Women's United Soccer Association. Despite continuing to switch leagues throughout the years, the Boston Breakers continued to find funding for the team. When the team folded in 2018 due to a lack of funding, the league held a draft for the players on the Boston Breakers.Since the team folded, the NWSL is experienced unprecedented growth and success. In the spring of 2024, San Diego Wave FC was sold for a record $120 million, which was double the past-record. The anticipated sale of Angel City FC reflects the rising value and investment interest in the league. Angel City was valued at $180 Million in March of 2024. Since then, new investors are contributing to a flourishing market, as evidenced by Seattle Reign's significant sale to the Seattle Sounders. Additionally, NWSL's new $240 million media-rights deal with ESPN, CBS, Amazon, and Scripps Sports has significantly boosted viewership by 95%. The league's expansion to 14 teams and increased match attendance crossed one million attendees. This was faster than ever in 2024, which further underlines its growing popularity. With a 98% rise in sponsorships and plans for future expansions, the NWSL is solidifying its position as a major player in the sports industry, reflecting both robust investor confidence and an expanding global market for women's soccer.

=== Baseball ===
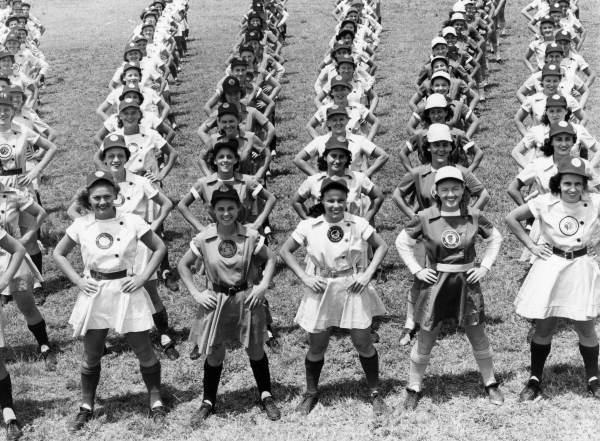
All-American Girls Professional Baseball League members performing calisthenics in Opa-locka, Florida, on April 22, 1948. The different baseball clubs are (L-R): Fort Wayne Daisies (partially visible), Chicago Colleens, Rockford Peaches, South Bend Blue Sox, Springfield Sallies and Peoria Redwings.

With the entry of the United States into World War II, several major league baseball executives started a new professional league with female players in order to maintain baseball in the public eye while the majority of able men were away. The founders included Philip K. Wrigley, Branch Rickey, and Paul V. Harper. They feared that Major League Baseball might even temporarily cease due to the war because of the loss of talent, as well as restrictions on team travel due to gasoline rationing.

Since many men were on the battlefield during the Second World War, the All-American Girls Professional Baseball League (AAGPBL), in place of Major League Baseball, was created in 1943 to provide entertainment for people exhausted by the war. It was such a success that the number of people who attended women's baseball games reached almost 1 million in 1948. Yet, when the war ended and Major League Baseball players came back home, female baseball players were obliged to fill the role of a housewife at home. AAGPBL lost its audience, struggled with finances, and ceased to exist in 1954. The National Girls Baseball League operated in the same era (1944–1954), drawing 500,000 in some seasons.

Forty years later, in 1994, a businessman in Atlanta struck a $3 million sponsorship deal with Coors and formed a women's professional baseball team called the Colorado Silver Bullets. About 20 members were selected from 1,300 baseball players nationwide for the team. The Bullets played games with both men's semiprofessional teams and regional teams. After the birth of the Ladies League Baseball in 1997, it included four teams. The Bullets fought with them.

The Ladies League Baseball changed its name to the Ladies Pro Baseball and added two teams into the league in 1998. However, after the first month, the league was suspended due to the financial difficulties of its sponsors. The Bullets folded in 1998 after Coors terminated its contract.

The Women's Professional Baseball League (WPBL) was established in 2024. Play is due to commence August 2026. The names of the initial four WPBL teams were announced in July 2026 and consist of the Boston Hunters, the Los Angeles Queens, the New York Heights and the San Francisco Firebells.

=== Basketball ===
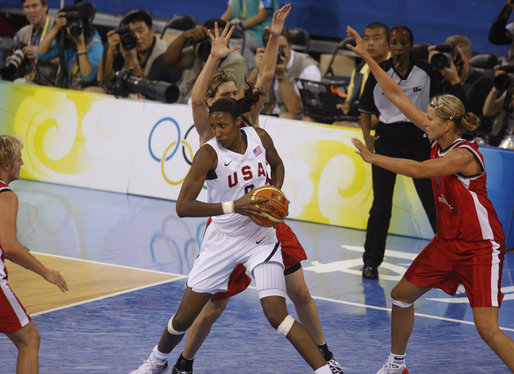
Lisa Leslie playing against Spain during the 2008 Summer Olympics.

There are many countries where women's professional basketball leagues exist besides the United States, such as Italy, Germany, Spain, and Brazil. Many American players went overseas, and some WNBA players play basketball in foreign countries during WNBA's offseason. In 2025, WNBA superstars Napheesa Collier and Breanna Stewart launched Unrivaled, a league playing 3-on-3 basketball on a compressed full court, as a way for WNBA players to play professionally in the U.S. during the WNBA offseason.

The Women's Professional Basketball League (WBL) was a professional women's basketball league in the United States. The league played three seasons from the fall of 1978 to the spring of 1981. The league is generally considered to be the first American professional women's basketball league to be founded. The next league was the Women's American Basketball Association (WABA) and the Women's Basketball Association (WBA) The WBA was a professional women's basketball league in the United States. The league played three seasons from the summer of 1993 to the summer of 1995. The league is considered to be the first American professional women's basketball league to be successful as a summer league, like the WNBA. Also, the American Basketball League (ABL) was founded in 1996 during an increase in interest in the sport following the 1996 Summer Olympics. The league played two full seasons (1996–97 and 1997–98) and started a third (1998–99) before it folded on December 22, 1998.

=== Golf ===
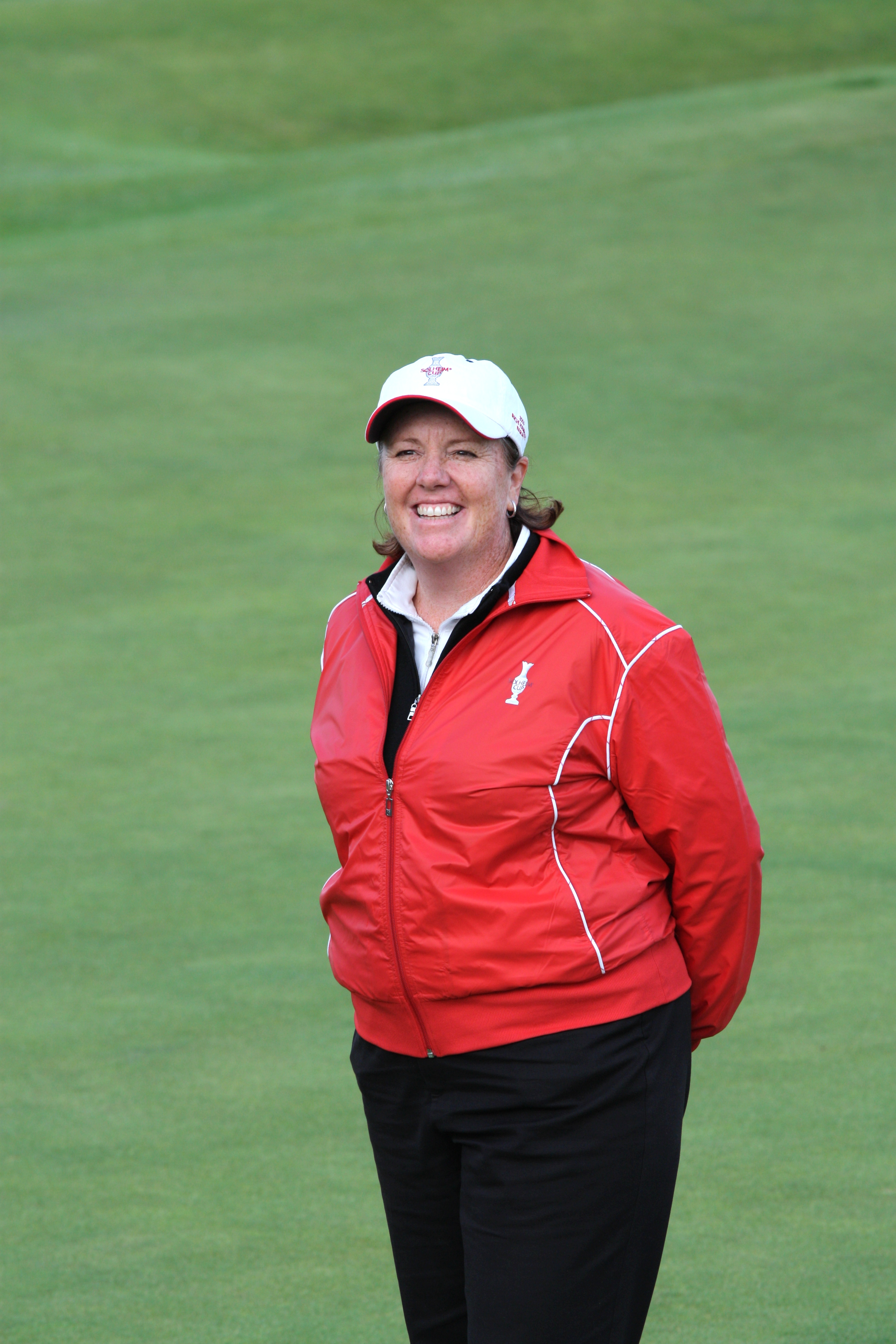
Meg Mallon is a highly respected American golfer who won six major championships and 18 LPGA Tour events during her distinguished career.

The LPGA (Ladies Professional Golf Association) was founded in 1950 and is the longest-running women's professional sports association. The LPGA Tour boasts several significant tournaments, including its five major championships that are key highlights of the women's golf calendar. The U.S. Women's Open, established in 1946, is renowned for its historic prestige and challenging courses. The Chevron Championship, founded in 1972, is celebrated for its dramatic finishes at Mission Hills Country Club. The Women's PGA Championship, first played in 1955, is organized by the PGA of America and stands as a testament to competitive excellence. The Women's British Open, previously known as the Women's British Open, has been a major since 2001 and is known for its demanding links courses. These tournaments underscore the LPGA Tour's prominence in women's golf, showcasing top talent and contributing to the sport's global appeal. The Evian Championship founded 30 years ago in 1994 on the Ladies European Tour (LET) as the Evian Masters, it is one of two major championships on the LET. Nancy Lopez is an iconic figure, known for her 48 LPGA Tour wins and three major titles, as well as her four Player of the Year awards. Betsy King, with 34 LPGA victories and six major championships, is celebrated for her consistent excellence, while Patty Sheehan, with 35 wins and six majors, is renowned for her competitive spirit and skill.

=== Horse racing ===
In 1906 Lula Olive Gill became the first female jockey to win a horse race in California. Later that same year, Ada Evans Dean rode her own horse to victory after her jockey had become ill. Indeed, Dean won twice — in spite of never having raced before.

Kathy Kusner mounted a successful legal case in 1968 to become the first licensed female jockey in the United States. Since the age of 16, she had been regularly winning unrecognized flat and timber races. As a licensed jockey, she rode races up and down the eastern seaboard and Canada and became the first licensed female jockey to ride races in Mexico, Germany, Colombia, Chile, Peru, Panama, South Africa, and what was then Rhodesia. She was also the first woman to ride in the Maryland Hunt Cup, widely considered the toughest timber race in the world. ABC Television filmed an award-winning documentary in Saratoga about Kusner being the first woman in modern times to ride in a steeplechase at the racetrack.

=== Ice hockey ===
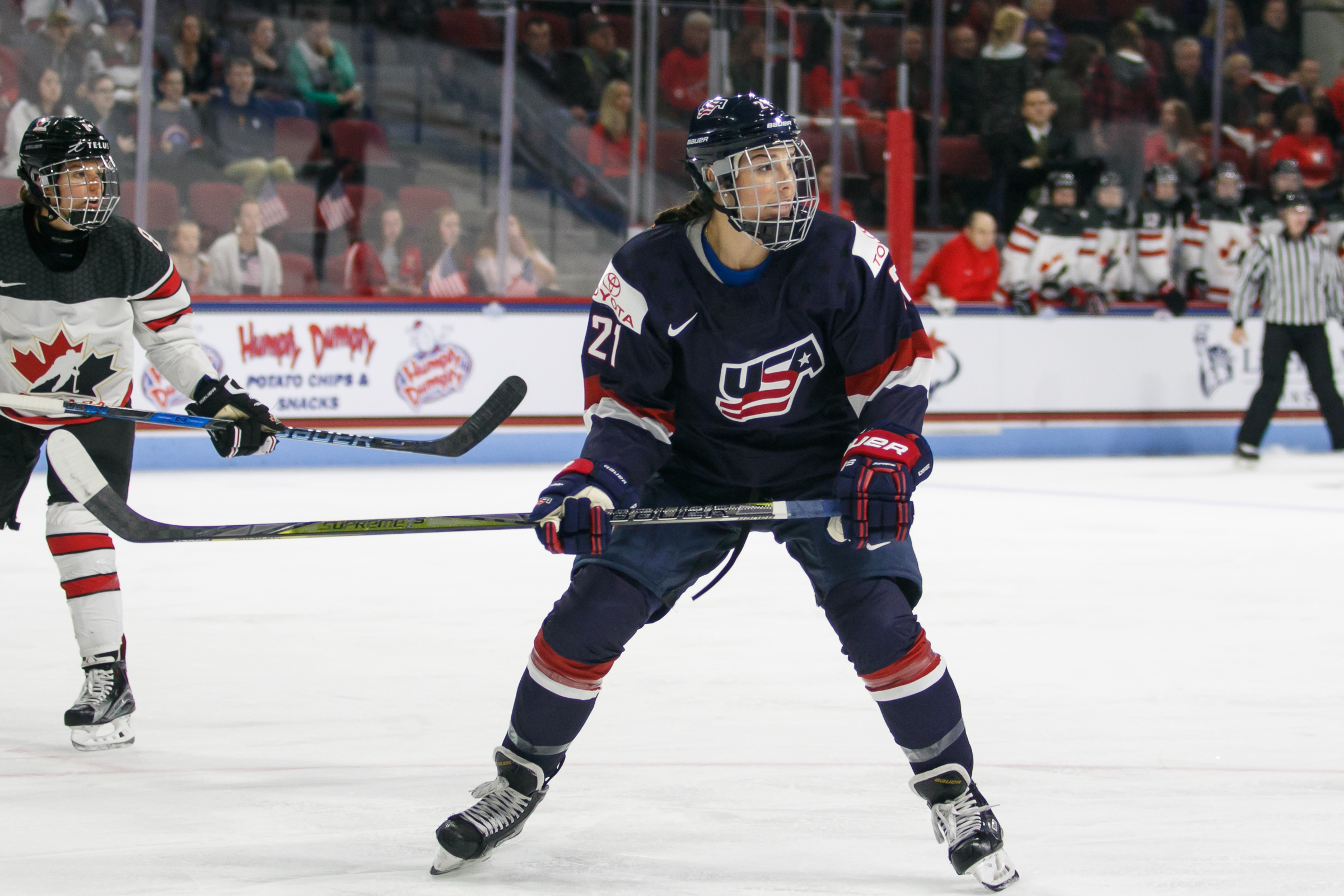
Hilary Knight been a key player for Team USA, winning multiple Olympic medals as well as multiple World Championship titles.

The Professional Women's Hockey League (PWHL) is a women's professional ice hockey league based in the United States but also featuring teams in Canada. It started play in January 2024 as the de facto replacement of the Premier Hockey Federation (PHF), which began play in 2015 as the National Women's Hockey League (NWHL). The PHF was established in 2015 with four teams. The league eventually grew to seven teams: the Boston Pride, Buffalo Beauts, Connecticut Whale, Metropolitan Riveters, Minnesota Whitecaps, and two Canadian teams, the Montreal Force and Toronto Six. The league debuted as the first women's professional ice hockey league to pay its players.

After the 2022–23 PHF season, the league was purchased by a group led by billionaire investor Mark Walter and tennis great Billie Jean King, shut down, and effectively replaced by the PWHL. The new league started with six teams, evenly divided between the two countries.

=== Field lacrosse ===
Athletes Unlimited Pro Lacrosse is a professional women's lacrosse league in the United States that played its first season in 2021. The league was the third women's league that Athletes Unlimited Pro Sports created, with its first two being softball and volleyball. The Athletes Unlimited Pro Sports model differs from the traditional sports model. Rather than the players being split into teams with one team winning a championship at the end of the year, each player scores individual points as the season progresses and the league crowns an individual champion at the end of the season. Teams are selected on a weekly basis by the top 4 scorers from the previous week using a draft.

=== Softball ===
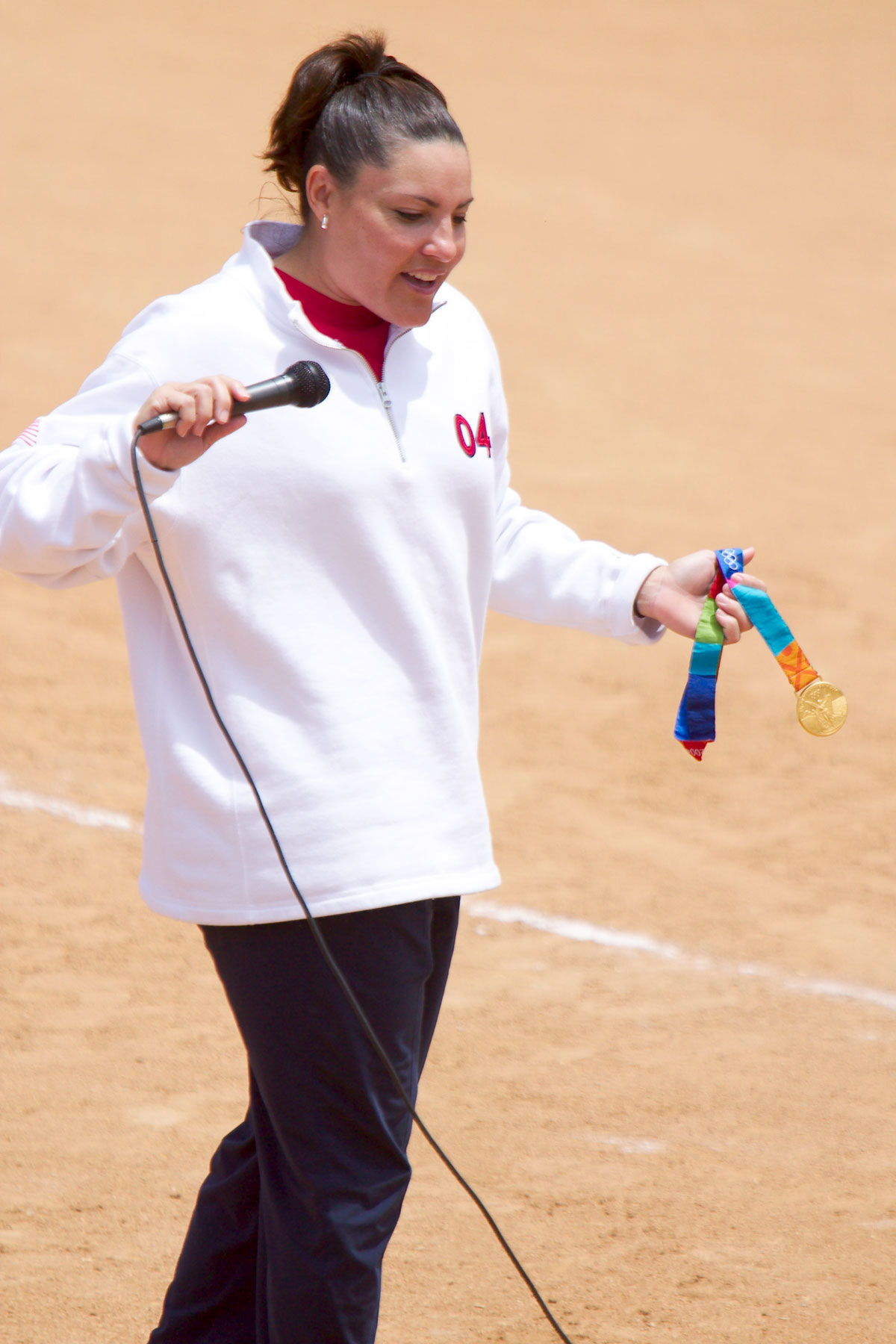
Lisa Fernandez a three-time Olympic gold medalist and a dominant pitcher.

The first women's professional softball league was established in 1976, but it only lasted for four years because of its financial reasons and failure in marketing. Professionally, the landscape includes leagues like Athletes Unlimited Softball, which offers a platform for elite players and promotes innovative formats and player empowerment. Historically, the National Pro Fastpitch (NPF) also contributed significantly before its closure in 2021. Additionally, softball's return to the Olympics in Tokyo 2020 and its prominence in international competitions underscore its global appeal and competitive spirit. Softball has been shaped by several key players who have made a lasting impact on the sport. Jennie Finch, known for her powerful pitching and charismatic presence, led Team USA to a gold medal in the 2004 Athens Olympics and has become a major advocate for the game. Cat Osterman, another dominant pitcher, won a gold medal in 2004 and a silver in 2008 while also contributing significantly to professional leagues like the NPF and Athletes Unlimited. Lisa Fernandez, a legend in the sport, secured three Olympic gold medals (1996, 2000, and 2004) and was a key player for Team USA. Angela Tincher and Danielle Lawrie have also made notable contributions, with Tincher excelling in both national and professional leagues, and Lawrie gaining recognition for her impressive collegiate career and professional achievements.

=== Tennis ===
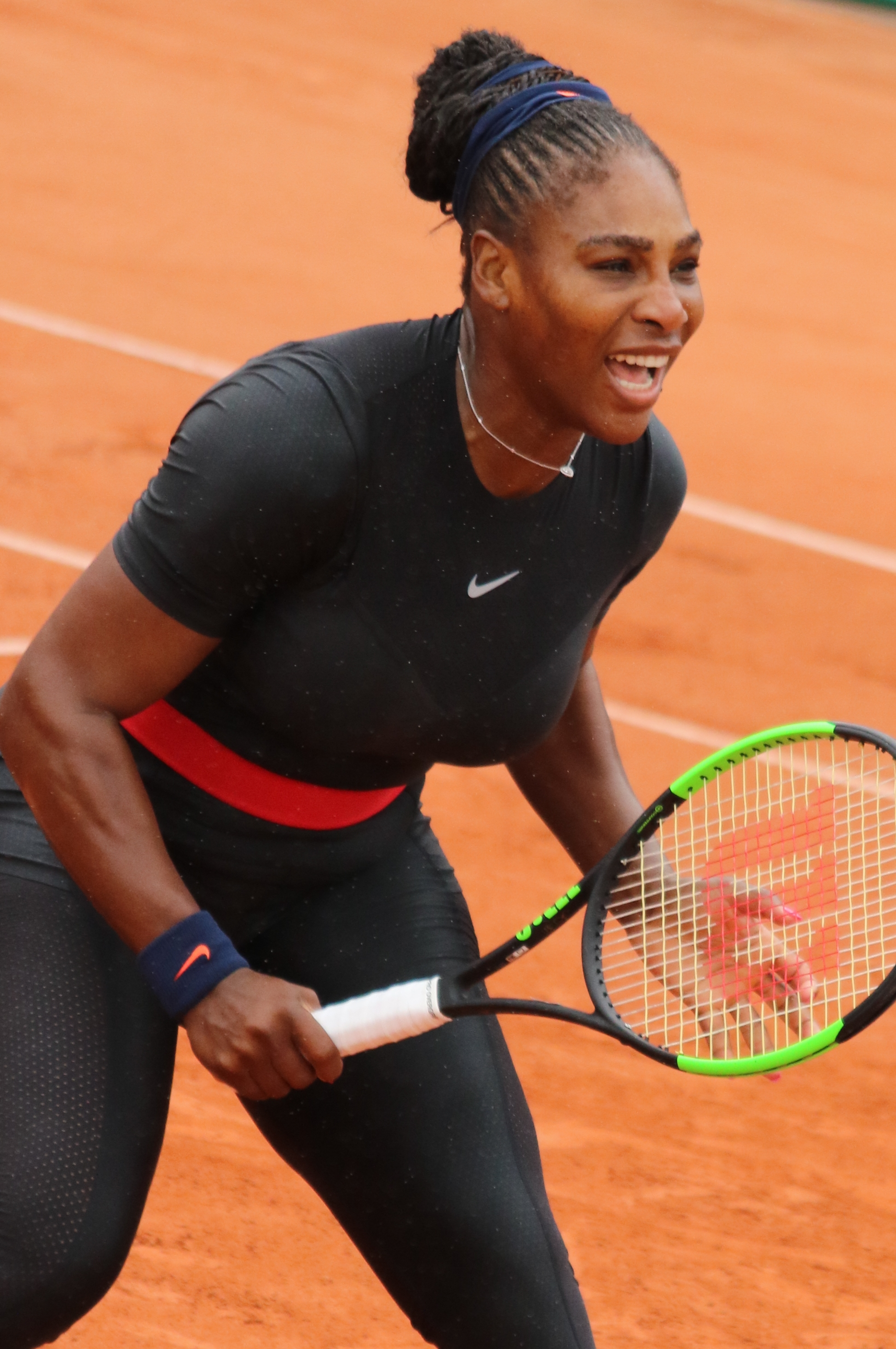
Serena Williams at the French Open, 2018. Known for her powerful game and lasting impact on the sport.

The Women's Tennis Association (WTA) was founded in 1973 with Billie Jean King at the forefront. It is widely considered the most (financially) successful organization in all of women's professional sports. The WTA has over 2,500 players from 92 nations, and it has over $100 million in prize money for 54 tournaments and 4 Grand Slams in 33 countries.

The United States has hosted the US Open, one of four annual major tennis tournaments, since 1887. Many tennis tournaments, including the US Open, allow women to play individually (singles), and on teams of two (two women: doubles; one woman and one man: mixed doubles).

Notably successful American female tennis players include Elizabeth Ryan, Molla Bjurstedt Mallory, Helen Wills Moody, Louise Brough Clapp, Margaret Osborne DuPont, Doris Hart, Maureen Connolly, Althea Gibson, Billie Jean King, Chris Evert, Martina Navratilova, Pam Shriver, Gigi Fernández, Venus Williams, and Serena Williams.

Notably successful active American female tennis players include Venus Williams, Bethanie Mattek-Sands, Sloane Stephens, Sofia Kenin, Madison Keys, Jessica Pegula, and Coco Gauff.

Chris Evert, Martina Navratilova, and Serena Williams are considered, with other non-Americans such as Margaret Court and Steffi Graf, the best female tennis players of all time.

=== Volleyball and beach volleyball ===
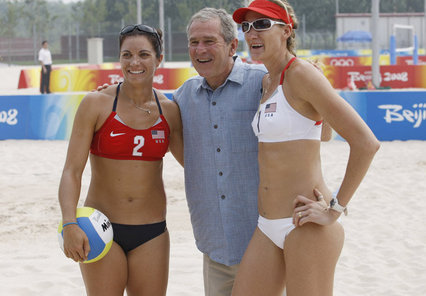
Top: United States women's national volleyball team discussing their strategy. Above: U.S. President George W. Bush with Misty May-Treanor (left) and Kerri Walsh Jennings of U.S. Women's Beach Volleyball team at the 2008 Olympics.

The Women's Professional Volleyball Association was established in 1986. The association organized professional 6-player indoor volleyball leagues and beach volleyball leagues, such as Budlight Pro Beach Volleyball League in 1997, in which 4 teams participated. It dissolved in 1997. Major League Volleyball, a professional league, operated from 1987 to 1989.

The U.S. women's national team has achieved significant success in international competitions, including winning Olympic gold medals in 1984 and 2020. The U.S. has demonstrated significant success in beach volleyball on the international stage. Notable achievements include the dominance of American teams such as Kerri Walsh Jennings and Misty May-Treanor, who won three consecutive Olympic gold medals from 2004 to 2012.

The Pro Volleyball Federation was announced on November 17, 2022 and began play in 2024.

=== Motorsports ===
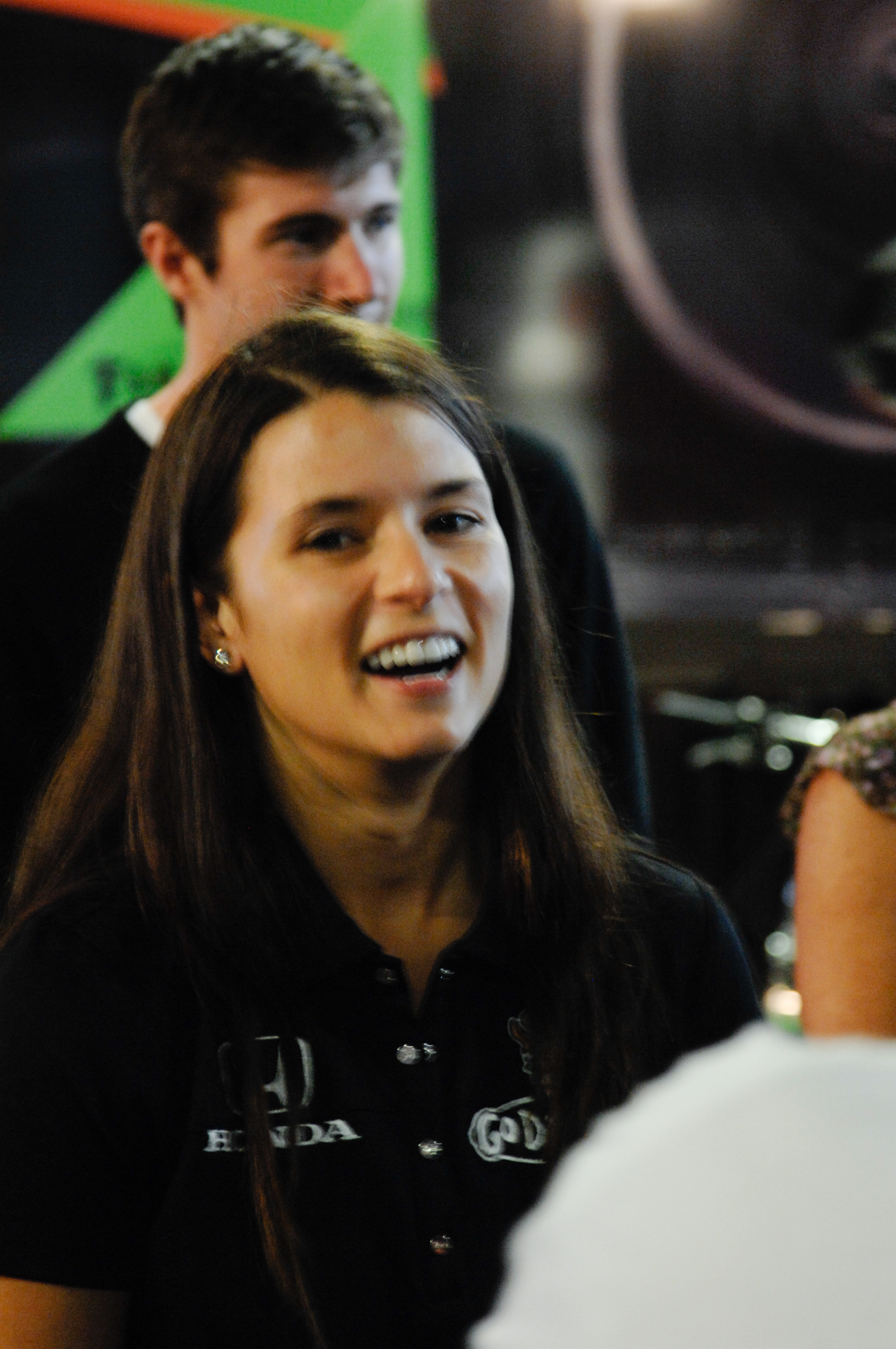
Danica Patrick at the 2010 Honda Grand Prix of St. Petersburg

Motorsports organizations allow men and women to compete on an equal footing.

Nine women qualified to the Indianapolis 500 formula race: Janet Guthrie (9th in 1978), Lyn St. James (11th in 1992), Sarah Fisher, Danica Patrick (3rd in 2009 and 4th in 2005), Simona de Silvestro, Pippa Mann, Milka Duno, Ana Beatriz Figueiredo, and Katherine Legge. They also raced at American open wheel racing (USAC National Championship, Champ Car and IndyCar Series). The only one to win a race was Patrick at the 2008 Indy Japan 300; she scored several podiums and finished 5th in the 2009 IndyCar Series season, 6th in 2008, and 7th in 2007. Guthrie finished 5th in a USAC race in 1979. Fisher scored two podiums.

The most successful NASCAR female drivers were Sara Christian, who finished 5th in a Cup Series race in 1949; Guthrie, who finished 6th in a 1977 round; and Patrick, who finished 4th in an Xfinity Series race.

In drag racing, Shirley Shahan was the first woman to win an NHRA national race, the 1966 Winternationals in the Top Stock class. Shirley Muldowney was the first female drag racer to compete in Top Fuel, the main class of the National Hot Rod Association, and won the 1977, 1980, and 1982 championships. Angelle Sampey won three consecutive Pro Stock Motorcycle titles from 2000 to 2002. Three of the daughters of drag racing legend John Force—Ashley, Brittany, and Courtney—followed in their father's footsteps as drivers. All three won multiple top-level NHRA events, Ashley and Courtney in Funny Car and Brittany in Top Fuel, and Brittany won the Top Fuel title in 2017 and 2022. Erica Enders-Stevens has won six season championships in Pro Stock, most recently in 2023.

Milka Duno scored three overall wins at the Rolex Sports Car Series.

Patrick has been receiving substantial mass media coverage since her first IndyCar season, starring in advertising campaigns in the United States and earning among the top 10 sportswomen.

== Organizations ==
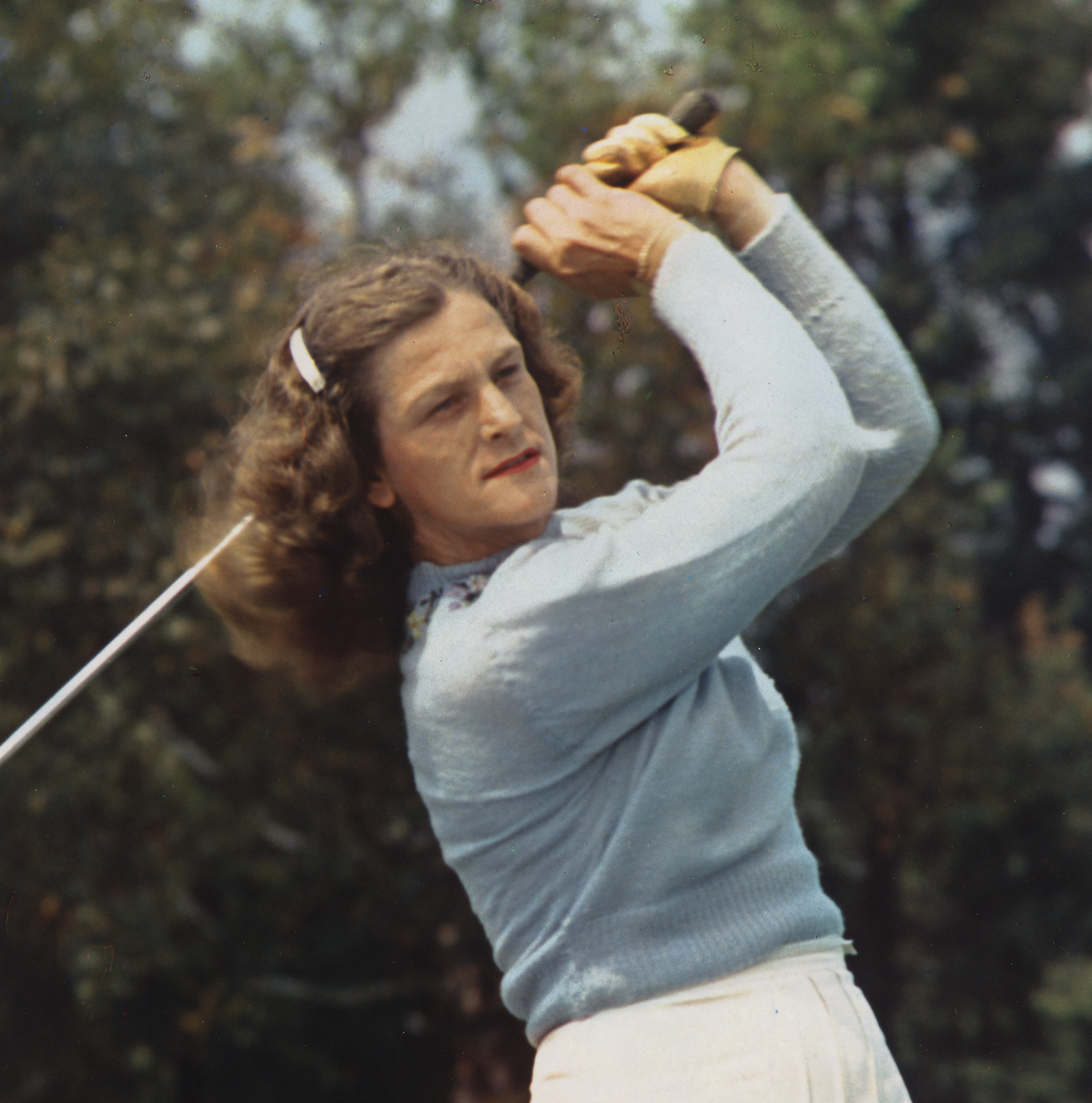
Babe Didrikson Zaharias was a multi-sport athlete who excelled in golf, track and field, and basketball, and is considered one of the greatest athletes of all time.

United Women's Sports LLC (UWS) is a professional sports company founded in 2016 in Providence, Rhode Island, United States. Operating women's professional sports leagues as a financially sustainable sports entertainment product, UWS works toward raising awareness of women in sports. Part of its mission also includes providing opportunities for women to work in sports, including disciplines such as marketing, on-air, production, operations, and finance.

Founded by Digit Murphy, she serves as chief executive officer, while Aronda Kirby, a former General Manager with the Boston Blades, holds the title of Chief Operations Officer. Their first venture involved lacrosse, with the launch of UWLX taking place in the summer of 2016. In the aftermath of the inaugural season, the Long Island Sound emerged as league champions.

In addition to the UWLX, Murphy and Kirby are both co-founders of the Play It Forward Sports Foundation, with the goal of advancing gender equity in sports at all levels of play. With the objective of providing more opportunities for women in sports as professional athletes, coaches, and managers, the model for Play It Forward Sports also allows female athletes a chance to participate in the community by educating, training, and mentoring young female athletes, providing them with earning potential.

Athlete ambassadors for Play It Forward include Molly Schaus, along with tennis players Neha Uberoi and Shikha Uberoi. In addition, Schaus is part of the Foundation's Board, which includes Valarie Gelb, Debbie Mckay, and John Mayers.

== See also ==
- History:
  - History of sports in the United States
  - 20th century women's fitness culture
  - Women's club movement in the United States
  - Women's health movement
- Gender in youth sports in the United States
- National Collegiate Athletic Association
- Women's sports bar
- Women's sports in Portland, Oregon
