= The Sports Bra =

Sports bar in Portland, Oregon, U.S.

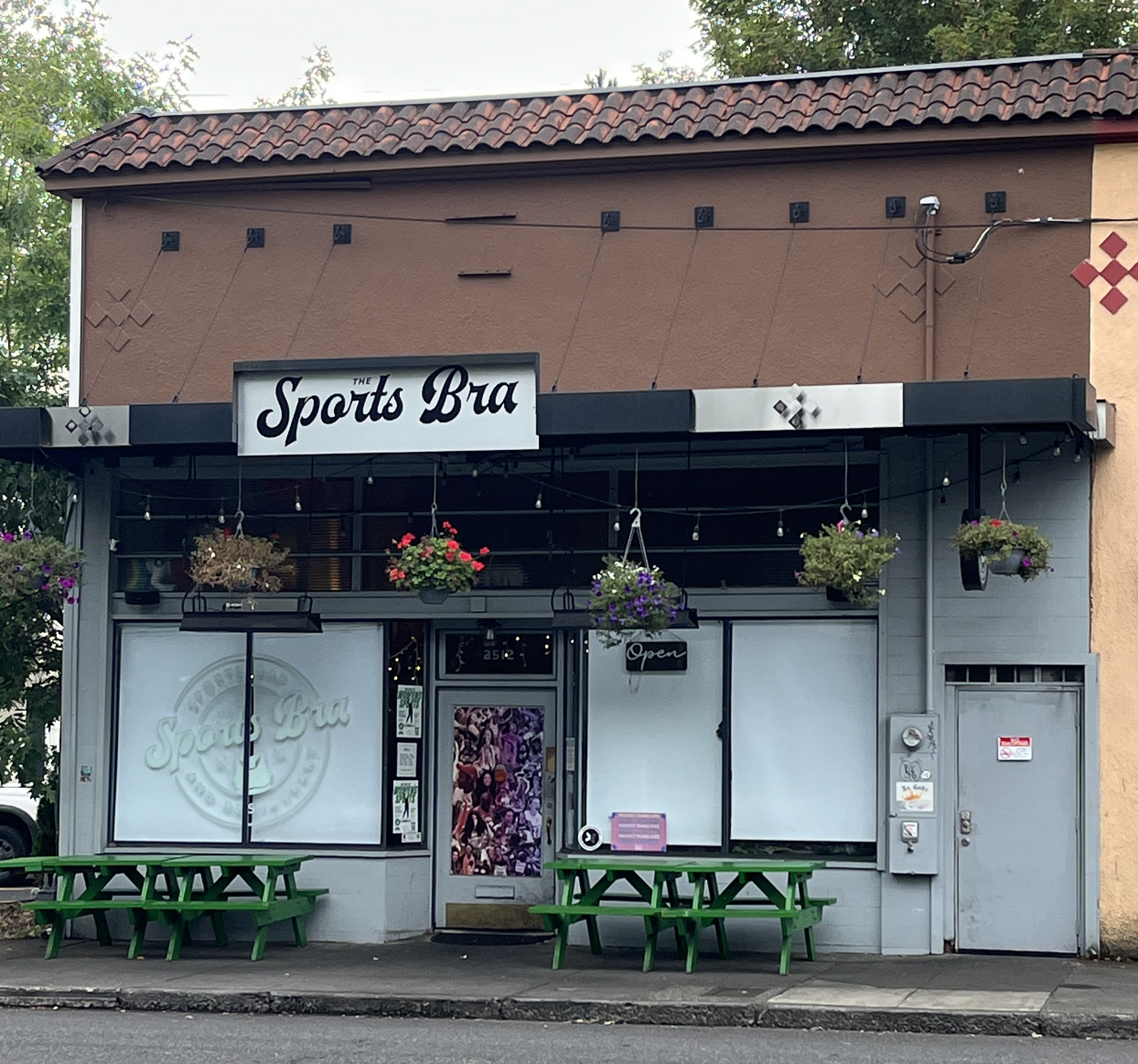
- The bar's exterior, 2025
- Interactive map of The Sports Bra

Restaurant information
- Established: April 1, 2022
- Owner: Jenny Nguyen
- Location: 2512 Northeast Broadway, Portland, Multnomah, Oregon, 97232, United States
- Coordinates: 45.5350°N 122.6398°W
- Website: thesportsbrapdx.com

The Sports Bra is a women's sports bar in Portland, Oregon, United States. The bar opened on April 1, 2022.

== Description ==
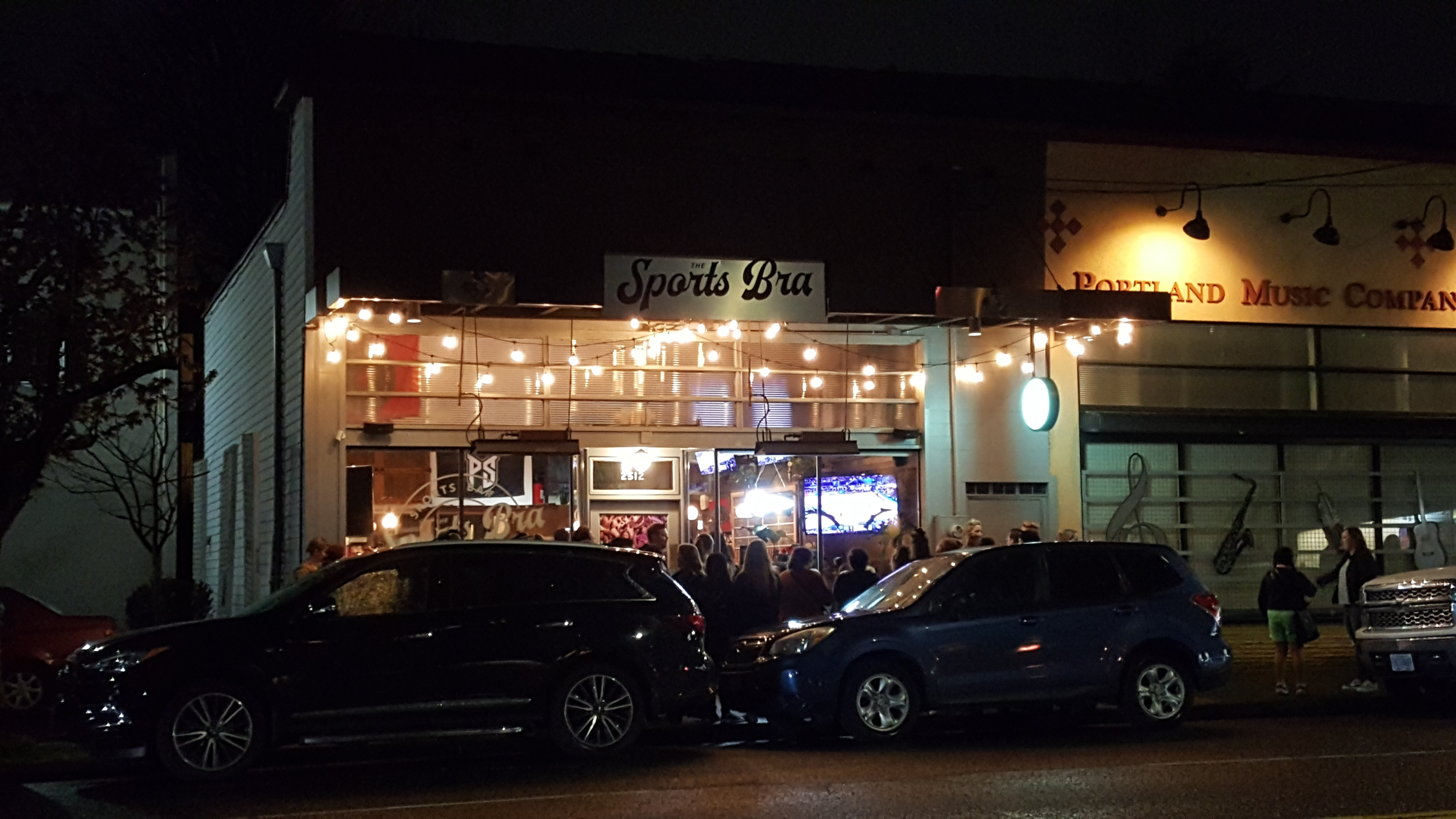
The bar's exterior on opening night (April 1, 2022)

Located at 25th Avenue and Broadway in northeast Portland's Sullivan's Gulch neighborhood, The Sports Bra is an LGBTQ and woman-owned bar focused on women's sports. The menu includes burgers, buffalo wings, and Vietnamese-style baby back ribs. The all-ages bar hosts official Portland Thorns FC viewing parties.

Jaylon Thompson of USA Today has called the business "a unique concept" with an owner who "aims to build community, empower and promote women in sports". According to Erin Rook of LGBTQ Nation, The Sports Bra "may be the world's first women's sports bar". Similarly, Lizzy Acker of The Oregonian said the business at the time "might be the only women's sports bar in the world".

== History ==
Local chef and former basketball player Jenny Nguyen opened the bar in April 2022. She conceived the idea after watching the 2018 NCAA Division I women's basketball tournament in a crowded sports bar on mute. Inspired by her girlfriend, the United States women's national soccer team's fight for equal pay, and the success of the MeToo movement, Nguyen started the business with her life savings of about $27,000, $40,000 in loans, and support from a Kickstarter campaign, which raised $105,135 by its conclusion in March 2022. She also partnered with female-owned breweries in the Portland metropolitan area, including Freeland Spirits, Herbucha, and Migration.

In January 2023, the bar hosted a Lunar New Year celebration and benefit for the Asian Pacific American Network of Oregon featuring a performance by White Lotus Lion Dance. In February, the bar hosted an event with U.S. Senator Ron Wyden and WNBA commissioner Cathy Engelbert to demonstrate support for the WNBA's return to Portland. The original Portland Fire folded after the 2002 WNBA season. Nguyen said the business had generated $944,000 in revenue in its first eight months and turned a profit in its first year.

=== Franchise and locations ===
In April 2024, The Sports Bra announced its plans to franchise thanks to an investment from the 776 Foundation and founder Alexis Ohanian. Returns from the investment will be invested back into the 776 Foundation to advance girls' and women's sports. In May 2026, The Sports Bra announced a crowdfunding campaign on Republic to raise $1.2 million to expand to a second location in Portland.

The first franchises are planned to launch in Boston, Indianapolis, Las Vegas, and St. Louis.

== Reception ==
The Sports Bra won in the Best LGBTQ Bar and the Best Sports Bar categories of Willamette Week's annual 'Best of Portland' readers' poll in 2022. It won in the equivalent categories (LGBTQIA+ Bar and Sports Bar) of the same poll in 2024 ad 2025. In 2023, Nguyen was one of 18 Portland industry professionals deemed "rising stars" by the restaurant resource and trade publication StarChefs.

== See also ==
- List of bars
- Women's sports in Portland, Oregon
