= 2025–26 Carolina Ascent FC season =

Carolina Ascent FC's second season

Carolina Ascent FC
2025–26 season
- Head coach: Phillip Poole
- Stadium: American Legion Memorial Stadium
Home colors	Away colors

The 2025–26 Carolina Ascent FC season is the team's second season as a professional women's soccer team in the USL Super League (USLS), one of two leagues to be in the top tier of women's soccer in the United States.

== Background ==
In the 2024–25 campaign, the Ascent topped the inaugural USL Super League table and claimed the league's first-ever Players' Shield. Carolina was then eliminated in the first round of the playoffs by Fort Lauderdale United FC after Kiara Locklear scored a controversial game-winning goal in extra time. Multiple Ascent members received accolades at the end of the season, with Jill Aguilera named Defender of the Year, coach Philip Poole named Coach of the Year, and all three of Aguilera, Mia Corbin, and Sydney Studer earning spots on the All-League first team.

=== Kit changes ===
On May 17, 2025, the Ascent announced its kits for the 2025–26 season. Building off of the previous year's uniforms, the Ascent's 'Trailblazer Kit 2.0' and 'Coastal Kit 2.0' feature artwork portraying various locations in North Carolina.

== Team ==
=== Staff ===
As of August 9, 2024

Front office
Position	Name
CEO & Managing Partner	(United States) Jim McPhilliamy
Technical staff
Head Coach	(United States) Philip Poole

=== Current squad ===
As of November 30, 2025

No.	Nat.	Name	Date of birth (age)	Since	Previous team	Notes
Goalkeepers
1	(United States)	Meagan McClelland	August 5, 2000 (aged 25)	2024	(Denmark) Odense Boldklub Q	–
15	(Puerto Rico)	Sydney Martinez	September 12, 1999 (aged 25)	2025	(United States) Brooklyn FC	–
16	(United States)	Charlotte Burge	April 4, 2006 (aged 19)	2024	(Germany) 1. FC Kaiserslautern	–
Defenders
2	(United States)	Brianna Martinez	April 22, 2000 (aged 25)	2025	(United States) Orlando Pride	LOA
7	(Puerto Rico)	Jill Aguilera	January 5, 1998 (aged 27)	2024	(United States) Chicago Red Stars	–
8	(United States)	Emily Moxley	October 29, 2000 (aged 24)	2024	(United States) North Carolina Tar Heels	–
12	(United States)	Sydney Studer	November 17, 2000 (aged 24)	2024	(United States) Washington State Cougars	–
13	(United States)	Addisyn Merrick	March 4, 1998 (aged 27)	2024	(United States) Utah Royals	–
19	(United States)	Meaghan Nally	June 30, 1998 (aged 27)	2025	(Denmark) Odense Boldklub Q	–
20	(United States)	Jenna Butler	January 18, 2000 (aged 25)	2025	(United States) Washington Spirit	–
26	(Colombia)	Isa Franco	February 26, 2008 (aged 17)	2024	(United States) Carolina Ascent FC (USLW)	ACA
Midfielders
3	(United States)	Giovanna DeMarco	July 9, 1999 (aged 26)	2024	(United States) San Diego Wave FC	–
14	(United States)	Taylor Porter	October 29, 1997 (aged 27)	2024	(United States) Portland Thorns FC	–
22	(England)	B Hylton	April 25, 2007 (aged 18)	2024	(United States) Charlotte Development Academy	–
24	(United States)	Emily Morris	June 18, 2003 (aged 22)	2025	(United States) Wake Forest Demon Deacons	–
25	(United States)	Sarah Troccoli	November 15, 1996 (aged 28)	2024	(Finland) Åland United	–
28	(United States)	Maggie Pierce	August 10, 2001 (aged 24)	2025	(United States) Carolina Ascent FC (USLW)	–
Forwards
6	(United States)	Maria Tapia	March 29, 2008 (aged 17)	2024	(United States) Charlotte Independence SC	ACA
9	(United States)	Mia Corbin	May 25, 1997 (aged 28)	2024	(Australia) Brisbane Roar FC	–
10	(United States)	Rylee Baisden	April 16, 1994 (aged 31)	2024	(Australia) Perth Glory FC	–
11	(Brazil)	Luana Grabias	February 7, 2000 (aged 25)	2025	(United States) Brooklyn FC	–
17	(United States)	Alyssa Walker	November 30, 1997 (aged 27)	2025	(United States) Spokane Zephyr FC	–
18	(United States)	Audrey Harding	July 14, 1998 (aged 27)	2024	(Sweden) KIF Örebro DFF	–
21	(United States)	Macey Bader	February 7, 2003 (aged 22)	2025	(United States) North Carolina Courage U23	–
23	(United States)	Riley Parker	March 31, 2000 (aged 25)	2025	(United States) Tampa Bay Sun FC	–
31	(United States)	Mackenzie George	March 10, 1999 (aged 26)	2025	(United States) Brooklyn FC	–
70	(United States)	Stella Spitzer	April 4, 2010 (aged 15)	2024	(United States) Sioux Falls City FC	–

== Competitions ==
=== Regular season standings ===
Pos	Team	Pld	W	L	T	GF	GA	GD	Pts	Qualification
1	Lexington (Q)	28	14	3	11	50	24	+26	53	Playoffs
2	Sporting JAX (Q)	28	16	7	5	54	32	+22	53	Playoffs
3	Carolina Ascent (Q)	28	15	7	6	39	27	+12	51	Playoffs
4	Dallas Trinity (Q)	28	11	10	7	36	40	−4	40	Playoffs
5	Spokane Zephyr (E)	28	10	9	9	34	28	+6	39	

Updated to match(es) played on May 16, 2026. Source: Gainbridge Super League
Rules for classification: 1) head-to-head points; 2) total goal differential; 3) total goals scored; 4) disciplinary points; 5) drawing of lots.
(E) Eliminated from Playoff contention; (Q) Qualified for Playoffs

=== Matches ===
==== August and September ====
August 30, 2025 1	Fort Lauderdale United FC	2–2	Carolina Ascent FC	Fort Lauderdale, Florida
7:30 pm ET	Van Treeck (yellow card) 26'; Gordon (yellow card) 30'; Smith (yellow card) 68'; Simpson 71'; Locklear 83'	Report	Mercado 1'; Morris (yellow card) 3'; Gordon 90+1' (o.g.)	Stadium: Beyond Bancard Field; Attendance: 1,400; Referee: Gloria Resendiz

September 6, 2025 2	Carolina Ascent FC	2–2	Tampa Bay Sun FC	Charlotte, North Carolina
7:35 pm ET	Corbin 40'; Mercado 90+2'	Report	Nasello 74'; Provenzano 81'	Stadium: American Legion Memorial Stadium; Attendance: 4,150; Referee: Marie Durr

September 13, 2025 3	Sporting JAX	2–2	Carolina Ascent FC	Jacksonville, Florida
7:30 pm ET	Puerta 11'; Hughes (yellow card) 27'; Kemp 39'	Report	Mercado 43'; Walker 74'; Morris (yellow card) 89'	Stadium: Hodges Stadium; Attendance: 7,402; Referee: Danielle Chesky

September 24, 2025 4	Carolina Ascent FC	0–1	Spokane Zephyr FC	Charlotte, North Carolina
7:00 pm ET	Corbin (yellow card) 33'; Studer (yellow card) 53'; Nally (yellow card) 79'; Butler (red card) 90+2'	Report	Zierenberg 35'; Oyler (yellow card) 85'	Stadium: American Legion Memorial Stadium; Attendance: 1,836; Referee: Kaitlyn Trowbrdige

==== October ====
October 4, 2025 5	Carolina Ascent FC	3–2	DC Power FC	Charlotte, North Carolina
	George 14'; Mercado 16'; Aguilera (yellow card) 43'; Walker 84'	Report	Studer 35' (o.g); Murnin 49'; Aquino (yellow card) 84'}; Detrizio (yellow card) 88'	Stadium: American Legion Memorial Stadium; Attendance: 3,161; Referee: Shawn Tehini

October 10, 2025 6	Lexington SC	1–1	Carolina Ascent FC	Lexington, Kentucky
	McCain (yellow card) 53' (goal) 90+7'	Report	Baisden (yellow card) 58'; Harding 72'; Studer (yellow card) 75'; Martinez (yellow card) 89'	Stadium: Lexington SC Stadium; Attendance: 1,711; Referee: Jaclyn Metz

October 18, 2025 7	Brooklyn FC	1–2	Carolina Ascent FC	Brooklyn
	Scarpelli (yellow card) 23'; Thompson (yellow card) 42'; Lewis 67'; Breslin (yellow card) 75'	Report	Martinez 24'; Aguilera (yellow card) 35' (goal) 56'; Walker (yellow card) 79'; Morris (yellow card) 89'; Harding (yellow card) 90'	Stadium: Maimonides Park; Attendance: 1,075; Referee: Carlos Rodriguez

October 30, 2025 8	Spokane Zephyr FC	1–2	Carolina Ascent FC	Washington, D.C.
	Cook 81' (.pen)	Report	Baisden 59', 68'; Harding (yellow card) 76'	Stadium: One Spokane Stadium; Attendance: 1,179; Referee: Thomas Snyder

==== November ====
November 8, 2025 9	Carolina Ascent FC	0–1	Fort Lauderdale United FC	Charlotte, North Carolina
	Hylton (yellow card) 90+2'	Report	Hamid 71'; Nabet (yellow card) 90'	Stadium: American Legion Memorial Stadium; Attendance: 3,735; Referee: Jamie Padilla

November 21, 2025 10	DC Power FC	0–1	Carolina Ascent FC	Washington, D.C.
	Duong (yellow card) 78'	Report	Baisden 57'; Corbin (yellow card) 80'	Stadium: Audi Field; Attendance: 2,182; Referee: Calin Radosav

==== December ====
December 6, 2025 11	Carolina Ascent FC	1–0	Brooklyn FC	Charlotte, North Carolina
	Harding 44'	Report	Hill (yellow card) 75'; Gogal (yellow card) 90+3'	Stadium: American Legion Memorial Stadium; Attendance: 2,399; Referee: Mark Verso

December 13, 2025 12	Dallas Trinity FC	1–0	Carolina Ascent FC	Cotton Bowl
	Brian (yellow card) 27'; Missimo 64'; Davison (yellow card) 79'; Strawn (yellow card) 90+3'	Report	Porter (yellow card) 22'	Attendance: 2,377; Referee: Cristian Campo

December 20, 2025 13	Carolina Ascent FC	0–0	DC Power FC	American Legion Memorial Stadium
	Aguilera (yellow card) 90+4'	Report		Attendance: 2,861; Referee: Gerald Flores

==== January and February ====
January 31, 2026 14	Sporting JAX	1–0	Carolina Ascent FC	Jacksonville, Florida
5:00 PM ET	Lester (yellow card) 1'; Pennock 85'	Report	Porter (yellow card) 59'; Groom (yellow card) 72'	Stadium: Hodges Stadium; Attendance: 8,247; Referee: Deny Kulasinac

February 7, 2026 15	Carolina Ascent	1–2	Lexington SC	American Legion Memorial Stadium
	Parker 36'; Aguilera (yellow card) 73'; Baisden (yellow card) 81'	Report	Weinert (yellow card) 12' (goal) 52'; Bourgeois 43'	Attendance: 1,703; Referee: Joe Surgan

February 14, 2026 16	Carolina Ascent FC	0–2	Spokane Zephyr FC	American Legion Memorial Stadium
	Porter (yellow card) 83'	Report	Jaskaniec (yellow card) 20'; Fontenot 26'; Silano 33'; Tucker (yellow card) 86'	Attendance: 2,064; Referee: Jaclyn Metz

February 21, 2026 17	Carolina Ascent FC	2–0	Dallas Trinity FC	Charlotte, NC
2:00 PM EST	Nabet (yellow card) 20' (yellow-red card) 86'; Studer 26', 63'	Report	Flynn (yellow card) 71' (yellow-red card) 90+1'; Guidry (yellow card) 73'; Wisner (yellow card) 84'	Stadium: American Legion Memorial Stadium; Attendance: 2,406; Referee: Thomas Snyder

==== March ====
March 13, 2026 18	Carolina Ascent FC	1–0	Tampa Bay Sun FC	American Legion Memorial Stadium
	Lussi 53'	Report		Attendance: 2,156; Referee: Kevin Broadley

March 17, 2026 19	DC Power FC	0–1	Carolina Ascent FC	Audi Field
	Gourley (yellow card) 84'	Report	Lussi 79'	Attendance: 1,050; Referee: Joshua Encarnación

March 22, 2026 20	Brooklyn FC	0–2	Carolina Ascent FC	Maimonides Park
		Report	Corbin 21' (pen.); Studer 71'	Attendance: 796; Referee: Atahan Yaya

March 28, 2026 21	Carolina Ascent FC	1–1	Fort Lauderdale United FC	Charlotte, North Carolina
	Corbin 64' (pen.)	Report	González 82'	Stadium: American Legion Memorial Stadium; Attendance: 3,540; Referee: Lauren Aldrich

==== April ====
April 5, 2026 22	Tampa Bay Sun FC	1–2	Carolina Ascent FC	Suncoast Credit Union Field
	Parsons 89'	Report	Aguilera 29' (pen.); Nabet 45+2'	Attendance: 1,482; Referee: Kaitlyn Trowbridge

April 12, 2026 23	Carolina Ascent FC	1–0	Lexington SC	American Legion Memorial Stadium
	Morris 72'	Report		Attendance: 5,189; Referee: Kelsey Harms

April 19, 2026 24	Dallas Trinity FC	0–1	Carolina Ascent FC	Cotton Bowl
		Report	Baisden 89'	Attendance: 5,225; Referee: Laadi Issaka

April 26, 2026 25	Tampa Bay Sun FC	1–2	Carolina Ascent FC	Suncoast Credit Union Field
	Connors 87'	Report	Butler 84'; Aguilera 90+6' (pen.)	Attendance: 2,274; Referee: Jamie Padilla

==== May ====
May 10, 2026 26	Fort Lauderdale United FC	0–3	Carolina Ascent FC	Charlotte, North Carolina
		Report	Nally 63'; Corbin 77'; Lussi 82'	Stadium: American Legion Memorial Stadium; Attendance: 3,750; Referee: Drew Klemp

May 17, 2026 27	Carolina Ascent FC	3–1	Sporting JAX	Charlotte, North Carolina
	Groom 16'; Lussi 36'; Aguilera 74'	Report	Boyan 7'	Stadium: American Legion Memorial Stadium; Attendance: 6,566; Referee: Marie Durr

=== Playoffs ===
May 24, 2026	Sporting JAX	v	Carolina Ascent	Jacksonville, Florida
5:00 PM ET				Stadium: Hodges Stadium

== Statistics ==
As of December 13, 2025

=== Appearances and goals ===
Starting appearances are listed first, followed by substitute appearances after the + symbol where applicable.

No.	Pos	Nat	Player	Total		USL		Playoffs	
No.	Pos	Nat	Player	Apps	Goals	Apps	Goals	Apps	Goals
Goalkeepers
1	GK	(United States) USA	Meagan McClelland	10	0	9+1	0	0	0
15	GK	(Puerto Rico) PUR	Sydney Martinez	1	0	1	0	0	0
16	GK	(United States) USA	Charlotte Burge	0	0	0	0	0	0
Defenders
2	DF	(United States) USA	Brianna Martinez	10	1	9+1	1	0	0
7	DF	(Puerto Rico) PUR	Jill Aguilera	12	1	12	1	0	0
8	DF	(United States) USA	Emily Moxley	4	0	3+1	0	0	0
12	DF	(United States) USA	Sydney Studer	11	0	10+1	0	0	0
13	DF	(United States) USA	Addisyn Merrick	0	0	0	0	0	0
19	DF	(United States) USA	Meaghan Nally	6	0	4+2	0	0	0
20	DF	(United States) USA	Jenna Butler	11	0	11	0	0	0
26	DF	(Colombia) COL	Isa Franco	0	0	0	0	0	0
Midfielders
3	MF	(United States) USA	Giovanna DeMarco	0	0	0	0	0	0
14	MF	(United States) USA	Taylor Porter	12	0	12	0	0	0
22	MF	(England) ENG	B Hylton	7	0	0+7	0	0	0
24	MF	(United States) USA	Emily Morris	8	0	6+2	0	0	0
25	MF	(United States) USA	Sarah Troccoli	3	0	3	0	0	0
28	MF	(United States) USA	Maggie Pierce	1	0	0+1	0	0	0
Forwards
6	FW	(United States) USA	Maria Tapia	0	0	0	0	0	0
9	FW	(United States) USA	Mia Corbin	11	1	8+3	1	0	0
10	FW	(United States) USA	Rylee Baisden	12	4	9+3	4	0	0
11	FW	(Brazil) BRA	Luana Grabias	6	0	0+6	0	0	0
17	FW	(United States) USA	Alyssa Walker	8	2	0+8	2	0	0
18	FW	(United States) USA	Audrey Harding	12	2	9+3	2	0	0
21	FW	(United States) USA	Macey Bader	1	0	0+1	0	0	0
23	FW	(United States) USA	Riley Parker	12	0	8+4	0	0	0
31	FW	(United States) USA	Mackenzie George	12	3	10+2	3	0	0
70	FW	(United States) USA	Stella Spitzer	1	0	0+1	0	0	0
Players who left the club during the season:
4	MF	(United States) USA	Maddie Mercado	6	4	6	4	0	0
Own goals for:
—	—	(United States) USA	Sh'Nia Gordon (8/30 v. FTLD)	0	1	0	1	0	0

== Transactions ==
=== Contract operations ===
Date	Player	Pos.	Notes	Ref.
July 25, 2025	(United States) Stella Spitzer	FW	Academy player signed to multi-year professional contract.	

=== Loans in ===
Date	Player	Pos.	Loaned from	Fee/notes	Ref.
July 2, 2025	(United States) Brianna Martinez	DF	(United States) Orlando Pride	Loaned through the end of the 2025 NWSL season.	
August 20, 2025	(United States) Maddie Mercado	MF	(United States) Seattle Reign FC	Loaned through the end of the 2025 NWSL season. Recalled early on October 8, 2025.	

=== Transfers in ===
Date	Player	Pos.	Previous club	Fee/notes	Ref.
July 3, 2025	(Brazil) Luana Grabias	FW	(United States) Brooklyn FC	Free agent signing.	
July 7, 2025	(United States) Alyssa Walker	FW	(United States) Spokane Zephyr FC	Free agent signing.	
July 9, 2025	(Puerto Rico) Sydney Martinez	GK	(United States) Brooklyn FC	Free agent signing.	
July 10, 2025	(United States) Emily Morris	MF	(United States) Wake Forest Demon Deacons	Free agent signing.	
July 12, 2025	(United States) Meaghan Nally	DF	(Denmark) Odense Boldklub Q	Free agent signing.	
July 14, 2025	(United States) Macey Bader	FW	(United States) North Carolina Courage U23	Free agent signing.	
July 15, 2025	(United States) Maggie Pierce	MF	(United States) Carolina Ascent FC (USLW)	Free agent signing.	
July 16, 2025	(United States) Mackenzie George	FW	(United States) Brooklyn FC	Transfer acquisition.	

=== Transfers out ===
Date	Player	Pos.	Destination club	Fee/notes	Ref.
June 14, 2025	(Israel) Eli Hutchinson	FW	Retirement.		
June 23, 2025	(Puerto Rico) Jaydah Bedoya	FW	(United States) DC Power FC	Out of contract.	
June 23, 2025	(United States) Cannon Clough	DF	(Australia) Central Coast Mariners FC	Out of contract.	
June 23, 2025	(United States) Annika Creel	DF		Out of contract.	
June 23, 2025	(United States) Kathrynn González	MF	(United States) Fort Lauderdale United FC	Out of contract.	
June 23, 2025	(United States) Renée Guion	DF		Out of contract.	
June 23, 2025	(United States) Samantha Leshnak Murphy	GK	(Sweden) FC Rosengård	Out of contract.	
June 23, 2025	(United States) Ashlynn Serepca	MF		Out of contract.	
June 23, 2025	(United States) Josie Studer	DF	(Australia) Brisbane Roar FC	Out of contract.	
