= 2022 Portland Thorns FC season =

Portland Thorns FC's tenth season

Portland Thorns FC
2022 season
- Owner: Merritt Paulson
- General manager: Karina LeBlanc
- Head coach: Rhian Wilkinson
- Stadium: Providence Park (capacity: 25,218)
- 2022: 2nd
- 2022 NWSL Challenge Cup: 2nd, West Division
- Playoffs: Champions
- Top goalscorer: League: Sophia Smith (14); All: Sophia Smith (18)
- Highest home attendance: 19,127 (Sept. 25 vs. CHI)
- Lowest home attendance: 9,876 (May 18 vs. WAS)
- Average home league attendance: 15,543
- Biggest win: POR 6–0 ORL (June 19)
- Biggest defeat: 0–2 (two matches)
| Home colors | Away colors |
- All statistics correct as of October 1, 2022.

The 2022 Portland Thorns FC season was the team's tenth season as a professional women's soccer team. Thorns FC plays in the National Women's Soccer League, the top tier of women's soccer in the United States.

== Background ==
In the wake of the 2021 NWSL abuse scandal, Thorns FC placed general manager Gavin Wilkinson on administrative leave from his role with the Thorns, but retained him as the president and general manager of the co-owned Portland Timbers. The team hired retired Thorns FC goalkeeper and Canadian international Karina LeBlanc as Gavin Wilkinson's replacement on November 2, 2021.

Following the exit of head coach Mark Parsons to manage the Netherlands women's national football team, Thorns FC hired another of the club's former players during Riley's tenure, Rhian Wilkinson, as his replacement. Wilkinson had also played on the Canadian national team as a teammate of LeBlanc and longtime Thorns FC and Canadian team captain Christine Sinclair. After her playing career, Wilkinson had been an assistant coach for the Canadian and English national teams.

== Stadium and facilities ==
Thorns FC continued to play and train in Providence Park, their home since the team's inaugural season in 2013. The team held its preseason training camp in Bend, Oregon.

== Broadcasting ==
On May 4, 2022, KPTV agreed to broadcast seven regular season Thorns FC matches locally via FOX 12 PLUS. These matches were in addition to the league's national agreements with CBS, Paramount+, and Twitch.

== Team ==
=== Staff ===
As of July 25, 2022.

Technical
| President of soccer | Gavin Wilkinson |
| General manager | Karina LeBlanc |
| Head coach | Rhian Wilkinson |
| Assistant coach | Sophie Clough |
| Assistant coach | Mike Norris |
| Assistant coach | Vytautas Andriuškevičius |
| Goalkeeper coach | Nadine Angerer |
Medical
| Head athletic trainer | Pierre Soubrier |
| Assistant athletic trainer | Kelly Strasser |
| Performance specialist | Tom Milroy |
| Head physician | Breanne Brown |

=== Squad ===
As of July 25, 2022.

| No. | Nat. | Name | Date of birth (age) | Since | Previous team | Notes |
Goalkeepers
| 1 | (United States) | Bella Bixby | November 20, 1995 (aged 26) | 2018 | (United States) Oregon State | |
| 35 | (United States) | Abby Smith | October 4, 1993 (aged 28) | 2021 | (United States) Kansas City Current | |
| 43 | (United States) | Shelby Hogan | May 10, 1998 (aged 24) | 2021 | (United States) Providence College | |
Defenders
| 4 | (United States) | Becky Sauerbrunn | June 6, 1985 (aged 37) | 2020 | (United States) Utah Royals FC | |
| 5 | (United States) | Emily Menges | July 28, 1992 (aged 29) | 2014 | (United States) Georgetown | |
| 14 | (Finland) | Natalia Kuikka | December 1, 1995 (aged 26) | 2020 | (Sweden) Kopparberg/Göteborg FC | INT (Note: INT: International player) |
| 20 | (United States) | Kelli Hubly | August 9, 1994 (aged 27) | 2017 | (United States) DePaul | |
| 25 | (United States) | Meghan Klingenberg | August 2, 1988 (aged 33) | 2015 | (United States) Orlando Pride | |
| 29 | (United States) | Tegan McGrady | October 11, 1997 (aged 24) | 2022 | (United States) San Diego Wave FC | |
| 39 | (United States) | Meaghan Nally | June 30, 1998 (aged 24) | 2020 | (United States) Georgetown Hoyas | |
Midfielders
| 8 | (Japan) | Hina Sugita | January 31, 1997 (aged 25) | 2022 | (Japan) INAC Kobe Leonessa | INT |
| 11 | (Costa Rica) | Raquel Rodríguez | October 28, 1993 (aged 28) | 2020 | (United States) Sky Blue FC | |
| 13 | (United States) | Olivia Moultrie | September 17, 2005 (aged 16) | 2021 | | |
| 17 | (United States) | Sam Coffey | December 31, 1998 (aged 23) | 2021 | (United States) Penn State | |
| 19 | (United States) | Crystal Dunn | July 3, 1992 (aged 30) | 2020 | (United States) North Carolina Courage (via (United States) OL Reign) | |
| 23 | (United States) | Yazmeen Ryan | February 25, 1999 (aged 23) | 2021 | (United States) Texas Christian | |
| 44 | (United States) | Gabby Provenzano | August 7, 1999 (aged 22) | 2022 | (United States) Rutgers | |
| 46 | (United States) | Taylor Porter | September 29, 1997 (aged 24) | 2021 | (Spain) UDG Tenerife | |
Forwards
| 9 | (United States) | Sophia Smith | August 10, 2000 (aged 21) | 2020 | (United States) Stanford | |
| 12 | (Canada) | Christine Sinclair | June 12, 1983 (aged 39) | 2013 | (United States) Western New York Flash | |
| 16 | (Canada) | Janine Beckie | August 20, 1994 (aged 27) | 2022 | (England) Manchester City W.F.C. | |
| 21 | (United States) | Marissa Everett | August 29, 1997 (aged 24) | 2019 | (United States) Oregon | |
| 22 | (United States) | Morgan Weaver | October 18, 1997 (aged 24) | 2020 | (United States) Washington State | |
| 37 | (United States) | Michele Vasconcelos | May 11, 1994 (aged 28) | 2022 | (Spain) Sevilla FC | |
| 41 | (United States) | Hannah Betfort | January 4, 1999 (aged 23) | 2021 | (United States) Wake Forest | |
| 45 | (United States) | Natalie Beckman | March 25, 2000 (aged 22) | 2022 | (United States) Denver | |

== Competitions ==
=== NWSL Challenge Cup ===
Portland entered 2022 as the defending NWSL Challenge Cup champions. In 2022, the Thorns competed in the cup's West Division during the group stage.

==== Group stage ====
| March 18, 2022 | OL Reign | 1–1 | Portland Thorns FC | Seattle, Washington |
| 22:00 EDT | Huerta 18' | Report | Sinclair 28' | Stadium: Lumen Field; Attendance: 7,343; Referee: Kevin Broadley |

| March 26, 2022 | San Diego Wave FC | 0–1 | Portland Thorns FC | San Diego, California |
| 22:00 EDT | | Report | S. Smith 5' | Stadium: Torero Stadium; Attendance: 6,000; Referee: Luis Guardia |

| March 30, 2022 | Portland Thorns FC | 3–0 | Angel City FC | Portland, Oregon |
| 22:00 EDT | S. Smith 31'; Ryan 53'; Weaver 78' | Report | | Stadium: Providence Park; Attendance: 9,902; Referee: Mark Allatin |

| April 2, 2022 | Portland Thorns FC | 0–1 | OL Reign | Portland, Oregon |
| 22:00 EDT | | Report | Lavelle 74' | Stadium: Providence Park; Attendance: 12,034; Referee: Elijio Arreguin |

| April 17, 2022 | Portland Thorns FC | 3–2 | San Diego Wave FC | Portland, Oregon |
| 19:00 EDT | S. Smith 4'; Sugita 21', 41' | Report | Briede 46'; Kornieck 67' | Stadium: Providence Park; Attendance: 12,440; Referee: Ricardo Fierro |

| April 24, 2022 | Angel City FC | 1–0 | Portland Thorns FC | Fullerton, California |
| 21:00 EDT | Press 29' (pen.); Roccaro (yellow card) 37'; Charley (yellow card) 81' | Report | Rodríguez (yellow card) 28'; Kuikka (yellow card) 90+7' | Stadium: Titan Stadium; Attendance: 4,524; Referee: John Griggs |

==== West Division standings ====
| Pos | Team | Pld | W | T | L | GF | GA | GD | Pts | Qualification | RGN | POR | SD | LA |
|---|---|---|---|---|---|---|---|---|---|---|---|---|---|---|
| 1 | OL Reign | 6 | 4 | 2 | 0 | 11 | 5 | +6 | 14 | Advance to knockout stage | — | 1–1 | 3–1 | 2–1 |
| 2 | Portland Thorns FC | 6 | 3 | 1 | 2 | 8 | 5 | +3 | 10 | | 0–1 | — | 3–2 | 3–0 |
| 3 | San Diego Wave FC | 6 | 1 | 2 | 3 | 9 | 11 | −2 | 5 | | 1–1 | 0–1 | — | 4–2 |
| 4 | Angel City FC | 6 | 1 | 1 | 4 | 6 | 13 | −7 | 4 | | 1–3 | 1–0 | 1–1 | — |

Source: NWSL
Rules for classification: 1) Total points; 2) Total goal differential; 3) Total number of goals scored; 4) Head-to-head points record; 5) Head-to-head goal differential; 6) Head-to-head number of goals scored; 7) Fewest disciplinary points; 8) Drawing of lots

=== 2022 Women's International Champions Cup ===
| August 17, 2022 Semi-final | Monterrey (Mexico) | 1–1 (3–2 p) | (United States) Portland Thorns FC | Portland, Oregon |
| 20:00 PDT | Olivieri (yellow card) 45+3'; García 68'; Rodríguez (yellow card) 90+2' | Report | Everett 5'; Hubly (yellow card) 45' | Stadium: Providence Park; Referee: Ekaterina Koroleva (United States); Assistant referees: Alicia Messer, CJ Koll; Fourth official: Corbyn May |
| | Penalties |
| | Bernal (penalty missed); Solís (penalty scored); Franco (penalty scored); Rodríguez (penalty scored) | | (penalty missed) Weaver; (penalty missed) Sinclair; (penalty scored) Betfort; (penalty scored) Coffey; (penalty missed) Beckie |

| August 20, 2022 Third-place playoff | Chelsea (England) | 1–0 | (United States) Portland Thorns FC | Portland, Oregon |
| 17:00 PDT | Reiten 64' | Report | | Stadium: Providence Park; Attendance: 11,447; Referee: Alyssa Nichols (United States) |

=== Regular season ===
Portland entered 2022 as the defending NWSL Shield champions of the 2021 National Women's Soccer League season.

==== Matches ====
| April 30, 2022 1 | Portland Thorns FC | 3–0 | Kansas City Current | Portland, Oregon |
| 15:00 PDT | Weaver 8'; Sinclair 34'; Smith 51' (Klingenberg) | Report | | Stadium: Providence Park; Attendance: 13,672; Referee: Brandon Stevis |

| May 13, 2022 2 | Portland Thorns FC | 0–0 | OL Reign | Portland, Oregon |
| 19:30 PDT | | Report | | Stadium: Providence Park; Attendance: 14,496; Referee: Elvis Osmanovic |

| May 18, 2022 3 | Portland Thorns FC | 1–1 | Washington Spirit | Portland, Oregon |
| 19:30 PDT | Smith 57' (Kuikka); Hubly (yellow card) 82' | Report | Hatch 63' (Heilferty); Elwell (yellow card) 90+1' | Stadium: Providence Park; Attendance: 9,876; Referee: Brad Jensen |

| May 21, 2022 4 | Portland Thorns FC | 0–2 | Houston Dash | Portland, Oregon |
| 15:00 PDT | Porter (yellow card) 64' | Report | Daly 45+3' (Prince); Schmidt 66' (Hanson) | Stadium: Providence Park; Attendance: 14,842; Referee: Michael Radchuk |

| May 28, 2022 5 | Chicago Red Stars | 2–2 | Portland Thorns FC | Bridgeview, Illinois |
| 19:00 CDT | Pugh 5' (Cook); Hill 20' (Cook) | Report | Sugita 7' (Ryan); S. Smith 47'; Beckie (yellow card) 59'; Coffey (yellow card) 84' | Stadium: SeatGeek Stadium; Attendance: 3,268; Referee: Samantha Martinez |

| June 3, 2022 6 | Portland Thorns FC | 3–0 | Angel City FC | Portland, Oregon |
| 19:30 PDT | Hubly; Sinclair 18' (Sugita), 68' (Beckie); Smith (yellow card) 22' | Report | | Stadium: Providence Park; Attendance: 14,493; Referee: Elton Garcia |

| June 8, 2022 7 | San Diego Wave FC | 2–2 | Portland Thorns FC | San Diego, California |
| 19:00 PDT | Kornieck 81' (Ali), 88' (Christen Westphal) | Report | Smith 22' (pen.); Sinclair 46' (Coffey); Rodríguez (yellow card) 70'; Pogarch (yellow card) 85' | Stadium: Torero Stadium; Attendance: 6,100; Referee: Mark Allatin |

| June 12, 2022 8 | Houston Dash | 0–4 | Portland Thorns FC | Houston, Texas |
| 18:00 CDT | Groom (yellow card) 22' | Report | Naughton 1' (o.g.); Smith 23' (pen.), 82' (Moultrie); Pogarch (yellow card) 67'; Moultrie 74' (Smith); Bixby (yellow card) 88' | Stadium: PNC Stadium; Attendance: 5,006; Referee: Karen Callado |

| June 19, 2022 9 | Portland Thorns FC | 6–0 | Orlando Pride | Portland, Oregon |
| 12:00 PDT | Sugita 21' (Beckie); Sauerbrunn 25'; Pogarch (yellow card) 32'; Smith 63' (Sauerbrunn), 86' (Ryan); Kuikka 79' (Moultrie); Porter 90+1' (Ryan) | Report | Pressley (yellow card) 88'; Listro (yellow card) 90+2' | Stadium: Providence Park; Attendance: 16,185; Referee: Samantha Martinez |

| July 1, 2022 10 | Angel City FC | 1–1 | Portland Thorns FC | Los Angeles, California |
| 19:30 PDT | McCaskill 2'; Le Bihan (yellow card) 87' | Report | Coffey (yellow card) 88'; Pogarch (yellow card) 88'; Beckman (yellow card) 90'; Ryan 90+6' (Pogarch) | Stadium: Banc of California Stadium; Attendance: 17,492; Referee: Adorae Monroy |

| July 10, 2022 11 | OL Reign | 2–2 | Portland Thorns FC | Seattle, Washington |
| 15:00 PDT | Athens 13'; Balcer 81'; Fishlock (yellow card) 87' | Report | McClernon 12' (o.g.); Sugita 60' (Klingenberg) | Stadium: Lumen Field; Attendance: 9,032; Referee: Mark Allatin |

| July 16, 2022 12 | Portland Thorns FC | 5–0 | NJ/NY Gotham FC | Portland, Oregon |
| 19:30 PDT | Porter 5'; Moultrie 7' (Ryan); Everett 11' (Weaver); Pogarch (yellow card) 33'; Betfort 65' (Pogarch); Weaver 80' | Report | Dydasco (yellow card) 30' | Stadium: Providence Park; Attendance: 16,870; Referee: Elijio Arreguin |

| July 29, 2022 13 | Racing Louisville FC | 1–2 | Portland Thorns FC | Louisville, Kentucky |
| 20:00 EDT | Chidiac 29' (Howell); Murray (yellow card) 75'; Nadim (yellow card) 89' | Report | Smith 7' (Weaver); Sauerbrunn (yellow card) 21'; Sugita 74'; Weaver (yellow card) 80' | Stadium: Lynn Family Stadium; Attendance: 7,089; Referee: Alyssa Nichols |

| August 5, 2022 14 | Portland Thorns FC | 3–3 | North Carolina Courage | Portland, Oregon |
| 19:30 PDT | Smith 8', 77' (Moultrie); Weaver 24' | Report | Ordoñez 61' (Pickett), 72' (Williams); Daniels 85' | Stadium: Providence Park; Attendance: 17,139; Referee: Natalie Simon |

| August 10, 2022 15 | Washington Spirit | 1–2 | Portland Thorns FC | Leesburg, Virginia |
| 19:30 EDT | Brooks (yellow card) 48'; Sullivan (yellow card) 63'; Bixby 76' (o.g.) | Report | Sinclair 84'; Weaver 90+2' | Stadium: Segra Field; Attendance: 3,037; Referee: Jeremy Scheer |

| August 24, 2022 16 | North Carolina Courage | 3–1 | Portland Thorns FC | Cary, North Carolina |
| 19:00 EDT | Ordoñez 24' (Pickett); Debinha 50'; Speck 83'; Mathias (yellow card) 90+3' | Report | Rodríguez 63' (Ryan) | Stadium: WakeMed Soccer Park; Attendance: 3,114; Referee: Karen Callado |
Note: Rescheduled from May 7 to accommodate Challenge Cup final

| August 27, 2022 17 | Portland Thorns FC | 0–2 | San Diego Wave FC | Portland, Oregon |
| 19:30 PDT | | Report | McNabb 17' (Morgan); Morgan 42' (Kornieck); Kornieck (yellow card) 74'; Sheridan (yellow card) 85' | Stadium: Providence Park; Attendance: 18,624; Referee: Kelsey Harms |

| September 9, 2022 18 | Orlando Pride | 0–2 | Portland Thorns FC | Orlando, Florida |
| 19:00 EDT | Montefusco (yellow card) 22'; Reiss (yellow card) 72' | Report | Ryan 31' (Weaver), (yellow card) 34'; Kuikka (yellow card) 54'; Sugita 65' (Moultrie); Weaver (yellow card) 90'; Klingenberg (yellow card) 90+5' | Stadium: Exploria Stadium |

| September 18, 2022 19 | Kansas City Current | 1–1 | Portland Thorns FC | Kansas City, Kansas |
| 16:00 EDT | Bennett (yellow card) 73'; Mace 90+4' (Edmonds) | Report | Rodriguez 84'; Sauerbrunn (yellow card) 90+3' | Stadium: Children's Mercy Park |

| September 21, 2022 20 | Portland Thorns FC | 3–0 | Racing Louisville FC | Portland, Oregon |
| 19:00 PDT | Smith 47'; Coffey 48' (Kuikka); Moultrie (yellow card) 33', (goal) 56' | Report | DeMelo (yellow card) 61' | Stadium: Providence Park; Attendance: 15,652 |

| September 25, 2022 21 | Portland Thorns FC | 3–0 | Chicago Red Stars | Portland, Oregon |
| 15:00 PDT | Kuikka (yellow card) 31'; Rodríguez (yellow card) 44'; Weaver; Porter 90+3' | Report | St-Georges (red card) 58'; Morse (yellow card) 63' (yellow-red card) 90+1' | Stadium: Providence Park; Attendance: 19,127; Referee: Alexandra Billeter |

| October 1, 2022 22 | NJ/NY Gotham FC | 3–3 | Portland Thorns FC | Harrison, New Jersey |
| 18:00 EDT | Kawasumi 39'; Onumonu 56' (Purce); Zerboni 74' (Mewis); Freeman (yellow card) 90+1' | Report | Smith 44', 45+1' (Sugita); Weaver 53' (Sugita) | Stadium: Red Bull Arena; Attendance: 4,752 |

==== Regular season standings ====
| Pos | Team | Pld | W | D | L | GF | GA | GD | Pts | Qualification |
|---|---|---|---|---|---|---|---|---|---|---|
| 1 | OL Reign | 22 | 11 | 7 | 4 | 32 | 19 | +13 | 40 | NWSL Shield, Playoffs – semi-finals |
| 2 | Portland Thorns FC (C) | 22 | 10 | 9 | 3 | 49 | 24 | +25 | 39 | Playoffs – semi-finals |
| 3 | San Diego Wave FC | 22 | 10 | 6 | 6 | 32 | 21 | +11 | 36 | Playoffs – first round |
| 4 | Houston Dash | 22 | 10 | 6 | 6 | 35 | 27 | +8 | 36 | Playoffs – first round |
| 5 | Kansas City Current | 22 | 10 | 6 | 6 | 29 | 29 | 0 | 36 | Playoffs – first round |
| 6 | Chicago Red Stars | 22 | 9 | 6 | 7 | 34 | 28 | +6 | 33 | Playoffs – first round |
| 7 | North Carolina Courage | 22 | 9 | 5 | 8 | 46 | 33 | +13 | 32 | |
| 8 | Angel City FC | 22 | 8 | 5 | 9 | 23 | 27 | −4 | 29 | |
| 9 | Racing Louisville FC | 22 | 5 | 8 | 9 | 23 | 35 | −12 | 23 | |
| 10 | Orlando Pride | 22 | 5 | 7 | 10 | 22 | 45 | −23 | 22 | |
| 11 | Washington Spirit | 22 | 3 | 10 | 9 | 26 | 33 | −7 | 19 | |
| 12 | NJ/NY Gotham FC | 22 | 4 | 1 | 17 | 16 | 46 | −30 | 13 | |

Source: NWSL
Rules for classification: Tiebreakers
(C) Champions

==== Results summary ====
| Overall | | | | | | | | Home | | | | | | Away | | | | | |
| Pld | W | D | L | GF | GA | GD | Pts | W | D | L | GF | GA | GD | W | D | L | GF | GA | GD |
|---|---|---|---|---|---|---|---|---|---|---|---|---|---|---|---|---|---|---|---|
| 22 | 10 | 9 | 3 | 49 | 24 | +25 | 39 | 6 | 3 | 2 | 27 | 8 | +19 | 4 | 6 | 1 | 22 | 16 | +6 |

Last updated: October 1, 2022.
Source: NWSLsoccer.com

==== Results by matchday ====
| Matchday | 1 | 2 | 3 | 4 | 5 | 6 | 7 | 8 | 9 | 10 | 11 | 12 | 13 | 14 | 15 | 16 | 17 | 18 | 19 | 20 | 21 | 22 |
|---|---|---|---|---|---|---|---|---|---|---|---|---|---|---|---|---|---|---|---|---|---|---|
| Stadium | H | H | H | H | A | H | A | A | H | A | A | H | A | H | A | A | H | A | A | H | H | A |
| Result | W | D | D | L | D | W | D | W | W | D | D | W | W | D | W | L | L | W | D | W | W | D |
| Position | 1 | 2 | 4 | 5 | 7 | 3 | 4 | 3 | 2 | 2 | 3 | 2 | 1 | 1 | 1 | 1 | 4 | 2 | 4 | 1 | 1 | 2 |

Updated to match(es) played on October 1, 2022. Source: NWSL
A = Away; H = Home; W = Win; D = Draw; L = Loss

=== NWSL Playoffs ===
The top six teams from the regular season qualified for the NWSL Championship playoffs, with the top two teams receiving a first-round bye.

==== Semi-finals ====
| October 23, 2022 | Portland Thorns FC | 2–1 | San Diego Wave FC | Portland, Oregon |
| 17:00 EDT | Rodríguez 20'; Dunn 90+3' | Report | Kornieck 8' | Stadium: Providence Park; Attendance: 22,035; Referee: Kevin Broadley |

==== Championship ====
| October 29, 2022 | Portland Thorns FC | 2–0 | Kansas City Current | Washington, D.C. |
| 20:00 EDT | Smith 4'; Merrick 56' (o.g.) | Report | | Stadium: Audi Field; Attendance: 17,624; Referee: Natalie Simon |

Championship Game MVP: Sophia Smith (POR)

== Awards ==
=== NWSL season awards ===
- NWSL Most Valuable Player: Sophia Smith

==== Best XI ====
Announced October 25, 2022

| Position | Player |
|---|---|
| Midfielder/Forward | (United States) Sam Coffey |
| Midfielder/Forward | (United States) Sophia Smith |

==== Second XI ====
| Position | Player |
|---|---|
| Defender | (United States) Kelli Hubly |
| Defender | (United States) Becky Sauerbrunn |

=== NWSL monthly awards ===
==== Player of the Month ====
| Month | Player of the Month | | Statline | Ref. |
|---|---|---|---|---|
| June | (United States) | Sophia Smith | 5 goals; scored goal or assist in last 5 matches | |

==== Rookie of the Month ====
| Month | Rookie of the Month | | Statline | Ref. |
|---|---|---|---|---|
| June | (United States) | Sam Coffey | 85% passing led league in June; 6 shots, 1 assist | |

=== NWSL weekly awards ===
==== Player of the Week ====
| Competition | Week | Nat. | Player | Won | Ref. |
|---|---|---|---|---|---|
| Challenge Cup | 4 | (Japan) | Hina Sugita | Won | |
| Regular season | 6 | (Canada) | Christine Sinclair | Nom. | |
| Regular season | 7 | (United States) | Sophia Smith | Nom. | |
| Regular season | 8 | (United States) | Sophia Smith | Nom. | |
| Regular season | 8 | (United States) | Morgan Weaver | Nom. | |
| Regular season | 13 | (United States) | Sophia Smith | Won | |

==== Save of the Week ====
| Competition | Week | Nat. | Player | Won | Ref |
|---|---|---|---|---|---|
| Regular season | 4 | (United States) | Bella Bixby | Nom. | |
| Regular season | 8 | (United States) | Bella Bixby | Won | |
| Regular season | 9 | (United States) | Shelby Hogan | Won | |
| Regular season | 10 | (United States) | Bella Bixby | Nom. | |
| Regular season | 12 | (United States) | Bella Bixby | Nom. | |
| Regular season | 13 | (United States) | Bella Bixby | Nom. | |
| Regular season | 14 | (United States) | Bella Bixby | Nom. | |
| Regular season | 16 | (United States) | Abby Smith | Won | |

== Transactions ==
=== 2022 NWSL Expansion Draft ===
The 2022 NWSL Expansion Draft was an expansion draft held by the NWSL on December 16, 2021, for two expansion teams, Angel City FC and San Diego Wave FC, to select players from existing teams in the league.

On December 8, 2021, the Thorns traded Simone Charley and Tyler Lussi to Angel City FC in exchange for $100,000 in allocation money, a 2022 NWSL Draft natural second-round pick, and immunity from Angel City in the expansion draft.

The Thorns protected nine players, and San Diego selected none of the unprotected players. On the day of the draft, the Thorns traded Christen Westphal and Amirah Ali to San Diego Wave FC in exchange for $50,000 in allocation money, but the Thorns did not officially acquire draft immunity from San Diego.

| Protected | Unprotected |
|---|---|
| Bella Bixby | Amirah Ali |
| Crystal Dunn | Nadine Angerer |
| Lindsey Horan | Hannah Betfort |
| Natalia Kuikka | Celeste Boureille |
| Emily Menges | Sam Coffey |
| Olivia Moultrie | Marian Dougherty |
| Raquel Rodríguez | Britt Eckerstrom |
| Sophia Smith | Marissa Everett |
| Morgan Weaver | Shelby Hogan |
| | Kelli Hubly |
| | Meghan Klingenberg |
| | Andressinha |
| | Nikki Marshall |
| | Meg Morris |
| | Meaghan Nally |
| | Madison Pogarch |
| | Hayley Raso |
| | Kat Reynolds |
| | Yazmeen Ryan |
| | Angela Salem |
| | Becky Sauerbrunn |
| | Christine Sinclair |
| | Kat Tarr |
| | Rachel Van Hollebeke |
| | Christen Westphal |
| | Sandra Yu |

- **Bold** indicates players selected in the Expansion Draft
- Blue highlights indicate United States federation players
- Italics indicate players who are not under contract but whose NWSL playing rights remain with the team

=== 2022 NWSL Draft ===
Draft picks are not automatically signed to the team roster. The 2022 NWSL Draft was held on December 18, 2021.

| Round | Pick | Nat. | Player | Pos. | College | Status | Ref. |
|---|---|---|---|---|---|---|---|
| 2 | 13 | (United States) | Sydny Nasello | FW | South Florida | Did not make preseason roster. | |
| 2 | 22 | (United States) | Gabby Provenzano | DF | Rutgers | Signed a one-year contract with one-year option. | |
| 4 | 48 | (United States) | Natalie Beckman | FW | Denver | Signed a one-year contract with one-year option. | |

=== Transfers in ===
| Date | Nat. | Player | Pos. | Previous club | Fee/notes | Ref. |
|---|---|---|---|---|---|---|
| January 7, 2022 | (United States) | Sam Coffey | MF | (United States) Penn State Nittany Lions | 2021 NWSL Draft pick signed a two-year contract. | |
| January 26, 2022 | (Japan) | Hina Sugita | MF | (Japan) INAC Kobe Leonessa | Signed a three-year contract. Transferred from INAC Kobe for an undisclosed fee. | |
| March 18, 2022 | (United States) | Taylor Porter | MF | (Spain) UDG Tenerife | Signed a one-year contract with one-year option. | |
| April 1, 2022 | (Canada) | Janine Beckie | FW | (England) Manchester City W.F.C. | Signed a three-year contract with one-year option. Transferred from Manchester City for an undisclosed fee. Rights acquired in a trade with Racing Louisville FC in exchange for $75,000 in allocation money and an additional $25,000 in allocation money contingent on undisclosed performance conditions. | |
| June 28, 2022 | (United States) | Katy Byrne | MF | (Hungary) Diósgyőri VTK | Signed as a National Team Replacement player. | |
| June 28, 2022 | (United States) | Cheyenne Shorts | DF | (Scotland) Celtic F.C. | Signed as a National Team Replacement player. | |
| June 28, 2022 | (United States) | Jada Talley | FW | (United States) Kansas City Current | Signed as a National Team Replacement player. | |
| July 1, 2022 | (United States) | Britt Eckerstrom | GK | (United States) Portland Thorns FC (retired) | Signed as a short-term goalkeeper replacement. | |
| July 7, 2022 | (United States) | Sophie French | DF | (United States) Portland Pilots | Signed as a National Team Replacement player. | |
| July 14, 2022 | (United States) | Michele Vasconcelos | DF | (Spain) Sevilla FC | Signed as a National Team Replacement player; extended to end of season on July 29, 2022 | |
| July 25, 2022 | (United States) | Tegan McGrady | DF | (United States) San Diego Wave FC | Acquired in exchange for Madison Pogarch. | |

=== Transfers out ===
| Date | Nat. | Player | Pos. | Destination club | Fee/notes | Ref. |
|---|---|---|---|---|---|---|
| January 26, 2022 | (United States) | Celeste Boureille | MF | (Italy) A.C. Milan | Contract expired. | |
| January 27, 2022 | (United States) | Lindsey Horan | MF | (France) Olympique Lyonnais | Loaned until June 2023. | |
| February 2, 2022 | (United States) | Angela Salem | MF | — | Retired. | |
| July 10, 2022 | (United States) | Britt Eckerstrom | GK | — | Short-term goalkeeper replacement contract expired. | |
| July 25, 2022 | (United States) | Madison Pogarch | DF | (United States) San Diego Wave FC | Traded for Tegan McGrady. | |
| July 29, 2022 | (United States) | Katy Byrne | MF | | National Team Replacement player contracts expired. | |
| July 29, 2022 | (United States) | Cheyenne Shorts | DF | | National Team Replacement player contracts expired. | |
| July 29, 2022 | (United States) | Jada Talley | FW | (Finland) KuPS | National Team Replacement player contracts expired. | |
