= Jenna Butler =

Jenna Butler may refer to:

- Jen Butler, Australian politician
- Jenna Butler (soccer), American soccer player
