= Rose City Riveters =

Independent supporters' group for Portland Thorns FC

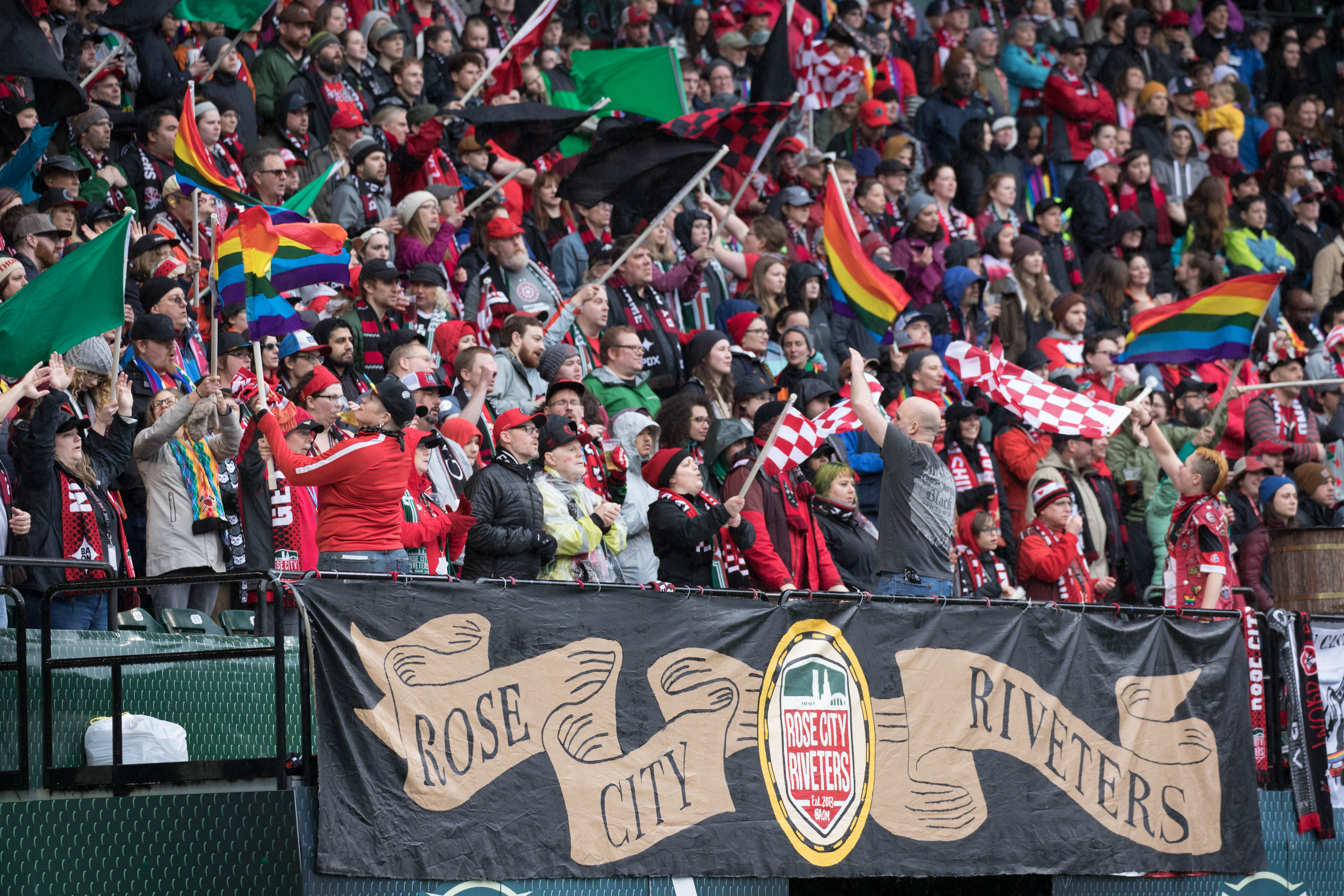
- Established: 2013
- Type: Supporters' group
- Team: Portland Thorns FC
- Location: Portland, Oregon
- Colors
- Website: 107ist.org/riveters

The Rose City Riveters is the supporters' group of Portland Thorns FC, Portland's National Women's Soccer League club.

== Organizational structure ==
The Riveters are the sole officially recognized organized supporters' group for the Thorns, with privileges to stand, play instruments, and wave flags in the north general admission stands. Originated by a teenaged supporter and formally founded by a group composed primarily of members of the Portland Timbers supporters' group Timbers Army in 2013 as the Thorns Alliance, they adopted the Riveters name as a play on Rosie the Riveter on April 3.

The Riveters initially adopted many of the practices and shared infrastructure with the Timbers Army, including the creation and coordination of large and complex tifo displays and performing football chants throughout the match. Both the Riveters and Timbers Army are considered part of the umbrella organization 107 Independent Supporters Trust (107IST), named after section 107 in Providence Park that both groups use.

Membership to the Riveters is open and does not require registration or paying dues, though joining the umbrella group 107ist with a donation is encouraged to fund tifo displays and organizational events.

== Culture ==
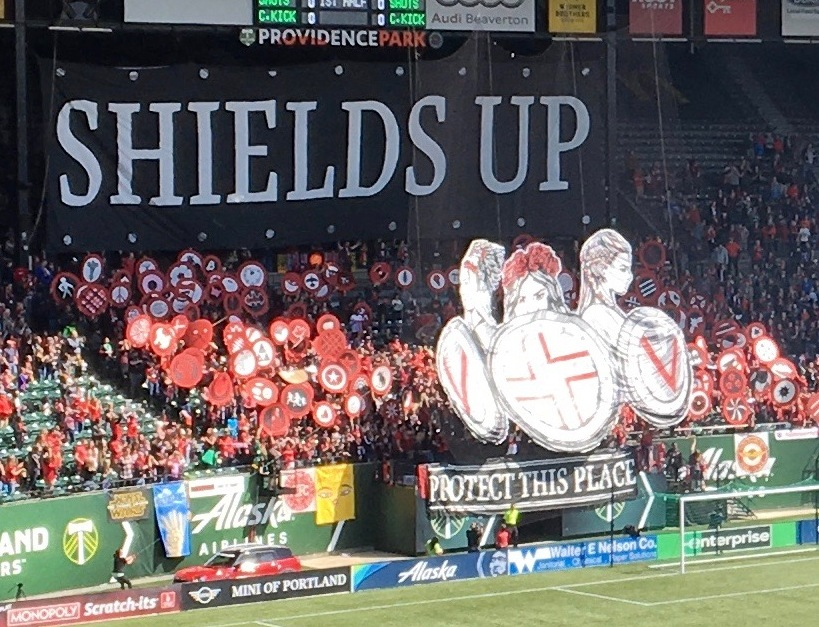
The Riveters create and display tifo before matches

The Riveters have a strong focus on inclusion regardless of race, gender, or sexuality, with explicitly anti-racist, anti-sexist, anti-homophobic, anti-transphobic, and anti-fascist stances demonstrated in its matchday displays and public communications. Most of its members are women.

A study of the Riveters conducted by a University of Portland professor found that most of the group's members cited a desire to support women's sports and gender equity as important factors in their participation. Many also cited the Riveters' culture of both inclusiveness and its intolerance of homophobic remarks compared to men's matches, including the Timbers. A separate study of the Riveters also cited the group's organic support and queer public performance as two of its most prominently distinct and disruptive traits.

The Riveters create and sell supporter-designed merchandise under the RivetGear label and share a meeting place near the stadium named the Fanladen with the Timbers Army where they sell merchandise, collect goods for matchday charity drives, and resell tickets.

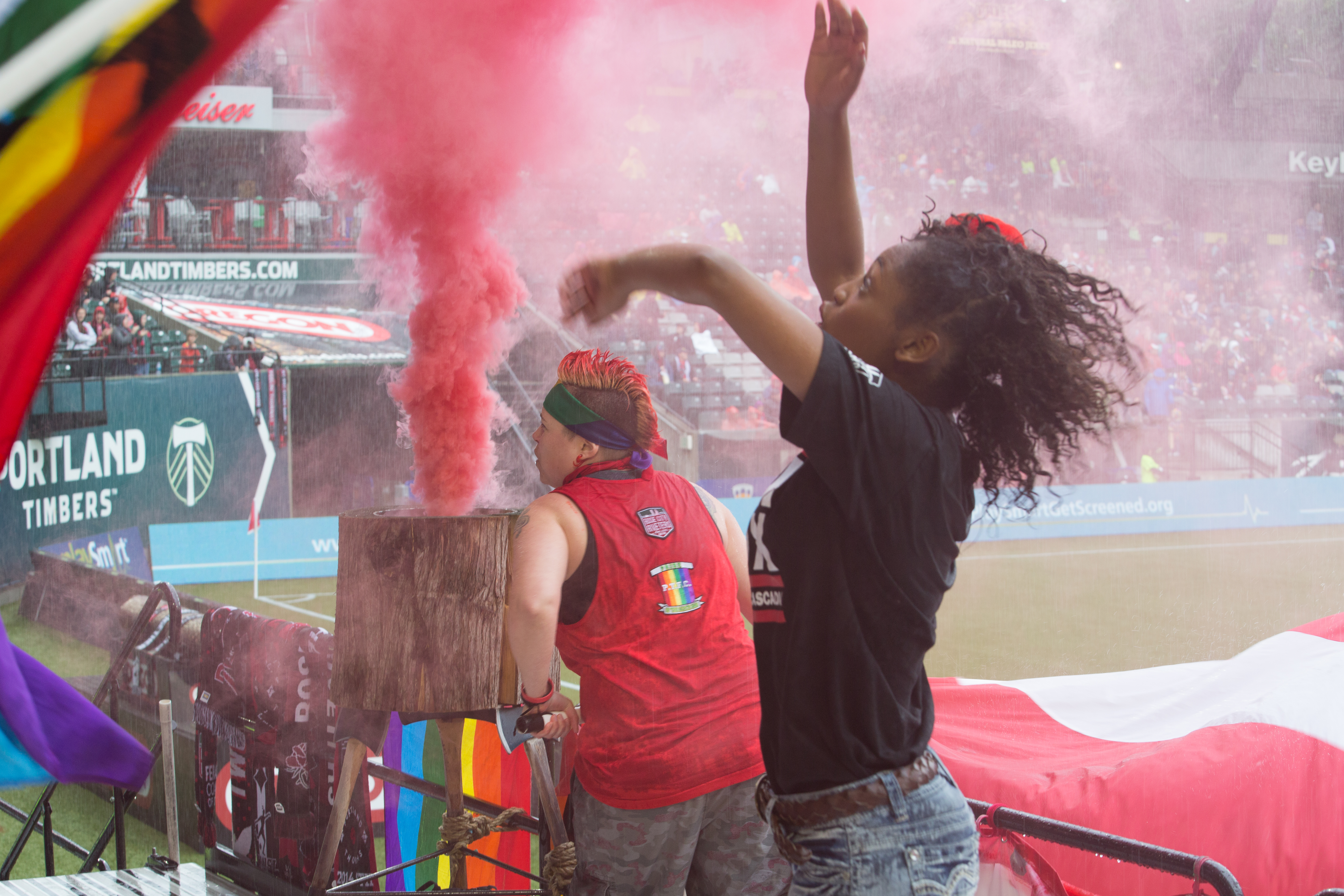
Capos of the Riveters deploy smoke bombs after the Thorns score goals

== Matchday traditions ==
The Riveters sing or chant for the duration of play, from the team's pre-match introductions to the end of the Thorns' traditional post-match walk around the stadium. After goals, the Riveters deploy a red or black smoke bomb after the team's primary colors, and when in the lead also sing a football chant of "One Goal Beyond", adapted to match the winning margin from the Madness version of "One Step Beyond".

=== Chants ===
The Riveters' chants mix adaptations of chants popularized by other clubs, such as "Carefree" and "When the Saints Go Marching In", and adaptations of popular songs, including singing the chorus of REO Speedwagon's "Keep on Loving You" at the 80th minute of each match. In rivalry matches against OL Reign and North Carolina Courage, the Riveters also traditionally sing a "Build a Bonfire" chant. Some chants include profanity, which the group collectively allowed early in its existence despite perceptions that matches of women's soccer should be more "family-friendly" than men's. They also chant the club's initials, P.T.F.C., punctuated with claps at pivotal points of matches. Some chants are specific to players or originated spontaneously from the crowd.

Riveters chants are led by designated volunteers on the north end's rail, called "capos".

=== Rail banners ===
The Riveters paint and hang banners recognizing players, and sometimes coaches or events, from the north-end rail. Many are parodies of brand logos, book and album covers, or pop-culture references. Rail banners are also sometimes activist-themed, such as when the club's front office prohibited certain anti-fascist imagery.

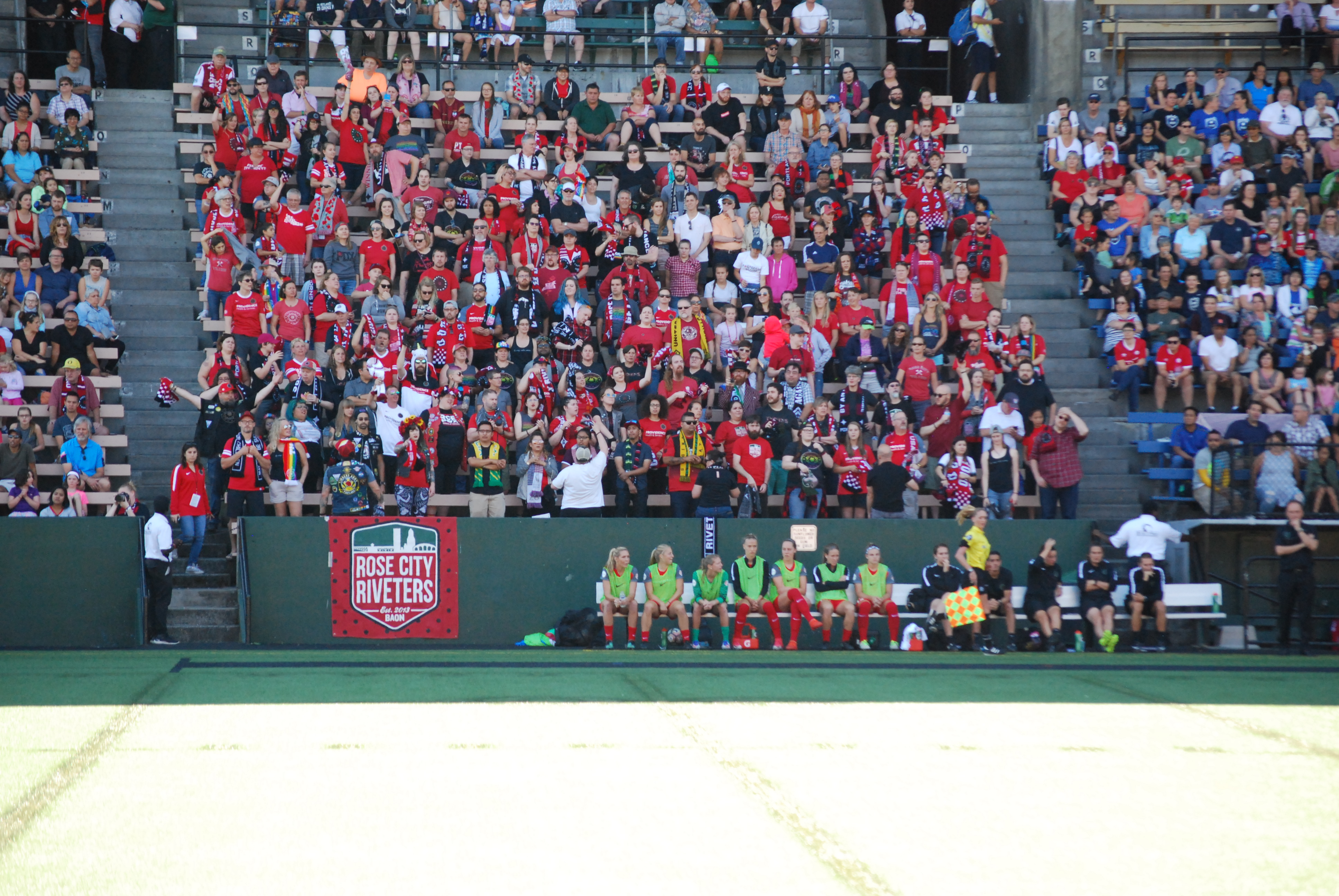
Riveters fill a section in Seattle Reign FC's Memorial Stadium

== Traveling support ==
The Riveters also travel to away matches and have remote supporters' groups who support the team while the Thorns are on the road. More than 200 Riveters travelled to the 2017 NWSL Championship in Orlando, Florida, which Portland won. The traveling support in 2017 was larger than the estimated 20 who travelled to the Thorns' first championship victory in 2013 played in Rochester, New York.

== Conflicts with front office ==
=== Iron Front symbol dispute ===
In 2019, the Thorns front office enforced a Major League Soccer rule against fans displaying the Iron Front symbol during matches, sparking a widespread protest against the rule at both Timbers and Thorns matches, which also spread to other teams in the league. Despite the ban, which had been actively enforced at Timbers matches, stadium staff did not remove an Iron Front banner hung from the stadium's north stands rail during a Thorns match and Thorns player Christine Sinclair wore a shirt bearing the Iron Front symbol when arriving to the stadium. The conflict ceased when Major League Soccer rescinded the rule in September 2019.

=== 2021 NWSL abuse scandal ===
Following the initial reports that the Thorns front office and ownership knew about but did not act on reports of alleged abuses by Paul Riley against Thorns, the Riveters called for the removal of general manager Gavin Wilkinson and later also for owner Merritt Paulson to sell both the Thorns and Timbers. Supporters formed an interest group soliciting commitments toward a fund to purchase a share of the club and protested outside of the stadium, and the Riveters, Timbers Army, and 107IST organized boycotts of team merchandise and concessions.

== Player awards ==
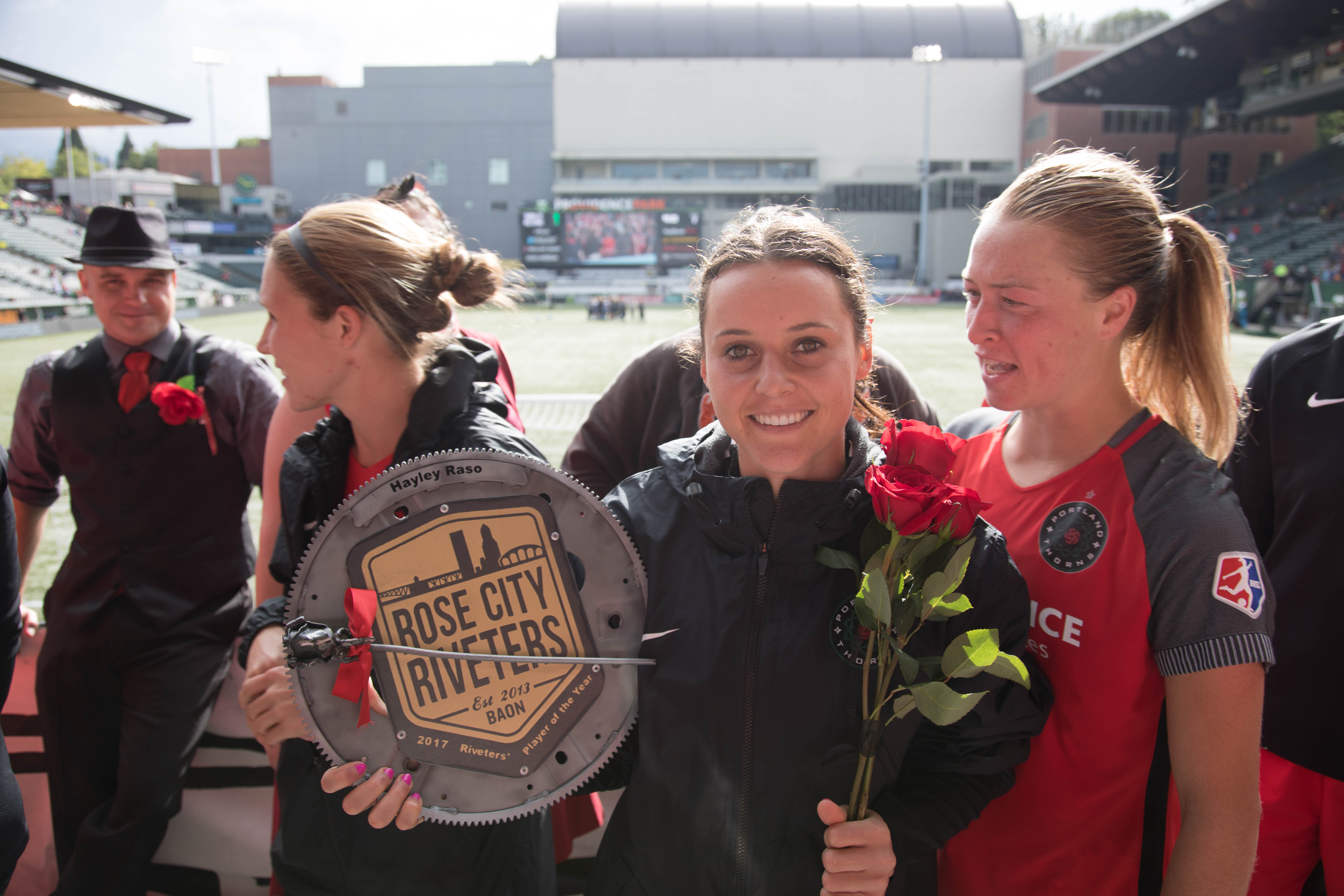
The Riveters named Hayley Raso its 2017 Supporters' Player of the Year

The Riveters annually vote on a Supporters' Player of the Year and present the award after the final home match of the season.

Riveters Supporters' Player of the Year
Year	Player
2013	Karina LeBlanc
2014	Verónica Boquete
2015	Michelle Betos
2016	Emily Menges
2017	Hayley Raso
2018	Christine Sinclair
2019	Margaret Purce
2020	No award
2021	Angela Salem
2022	Sophia Smith
2023	Morgan Weaver
2024	Hina Sugita
2025	Olivia Moultrie
2026	Pietra Tordin

== Notable members ==
- Hailey Kilgore, 2018 Tony Award nominee

== Honors ==
- Independent Supporters Council Tifo of the Year: 2018

== See also ==
- Women's sports in Portland, Oregon
