= Olivia Moultrie =

American soccer player (born 2005)

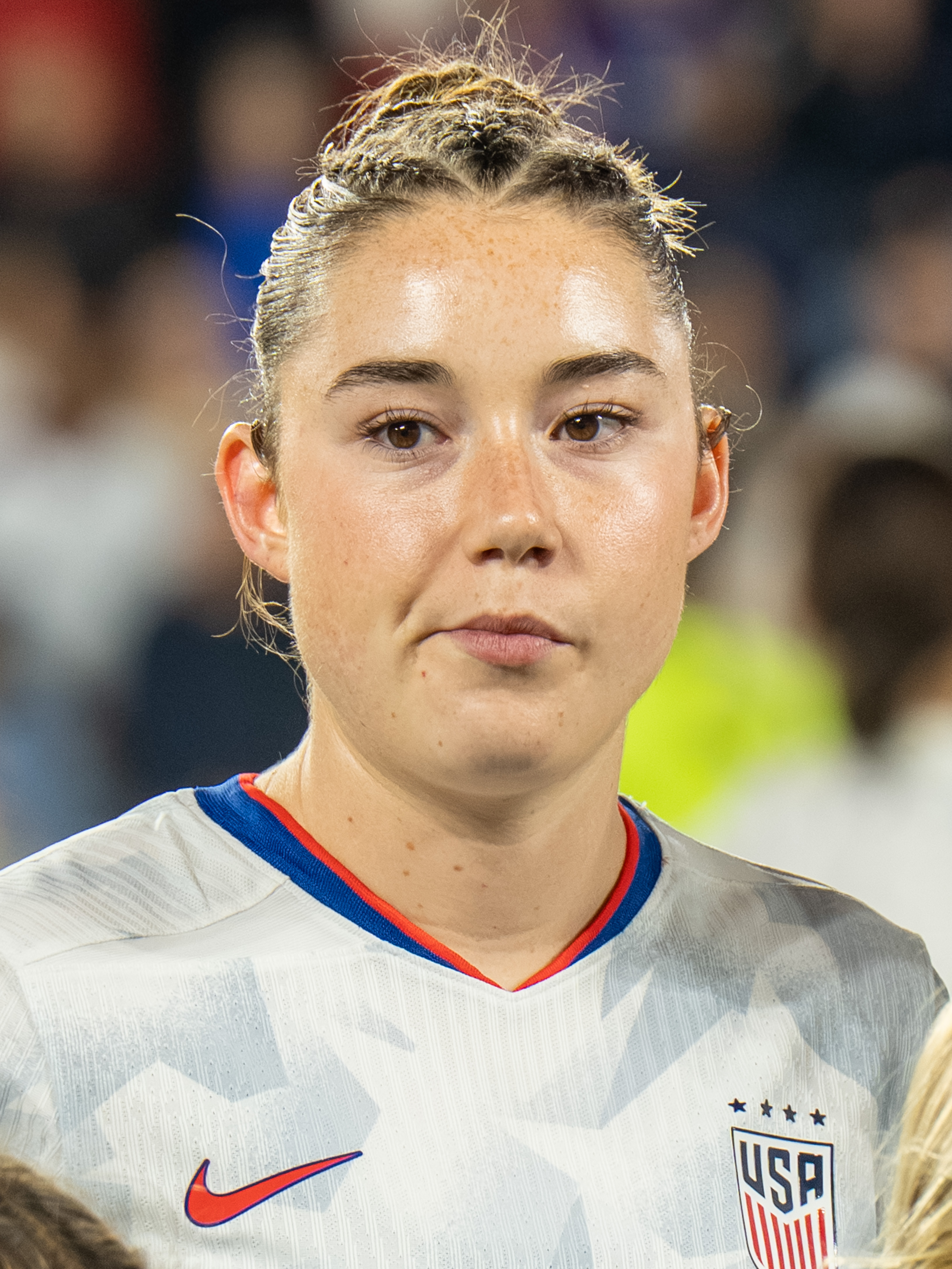
- Moultrie with the United States in 2025

Personal information
- Full name: Olivia Lynn Moultrie
- Date of birth: September 17, 2005 (age 21)
- Place of birth: Santa Clarita, California
- Height: 5 ft 7 in (1.70 m)
- Position: Attacking midfielder

Team information
- Current team: Portland Thorns
- Number: 13

Youth career
- 2017: Total Futbol Academy
- 2017–2019: Beach FC
- 2019–2021: Portland Thorns FC

Senior career*
| Years | Team | Apps | (Gls) |
| 2021– | Portland Thorns FC | 118 | (28) |

International career^{‡}
| 2018–2019 | United States U15 | | |
| 2019 | United States U16 | | |
| 2020 | United States U17 | | |
| 2022– | United States U20 | 5 | (2) |
| 2023– | United States | 18 | (5) |
Medal record
CONCACAF W Gold Cup
| Winner | 2024 United States |
- * Club domestic league appearances and goals as of 17:59, November 11, 2026 (UTC) ‡ National team caps and goals as of June 9, 2026

Olivia Lynn Moultrie (born September 17, 2005) is an American professional soccer player who plays as an attacking midfielder for the Portland Thorns of the National Women's Soccer League (NWSL) and the United States national team.

Moultrie signed her first professional contract with the Thorns at age 15 in 2021, following a lawsuit against the NWSL that successfully removed the league's age limit. She won the 2022 NWSL Championship with the Thorns and was named to the NWSL Best XI First Team in 2025.

Moultrie made her senior debut for the United States at age 18 in 2023, earning U.S. Soccer Young Female Player of the Year afterwards.

== Early life ==
Moultrie was born in Santa Clarita, California to K.C. and Jessica Moultrie, who both participated in college athletics, and was raised in the Canyon Country district of Santa Clarita, California. Moultrie is also a member of The Church of Jesus Christ of Latter-day Saints. She started training in soccer when she was four years old. By fifth grade, she was homeschooled so that she could focus on soccer and became the first girl on a boys' club team to play in the U.S. Soccer Development Academy system. At 11, she accepted a full scholarship offer to play soccer for the Tar Heels of the University of North Carolina at Chapel Hill when she reached college age (from the 2024 season), becoming the youngest girls' soccer player to publicly accept a college offer at the time. Shortly after, she traveled to Europe to train. Her family began planning a move to Lyon, France, so she could begin playing professionally as soon as possible; however, these plans were abandoned when the Portland Thorns FC signed her in 2019. She moved from California to Wilsonville, Oregon where she now resides.

== Club career ==
=== Portland Thorns ===
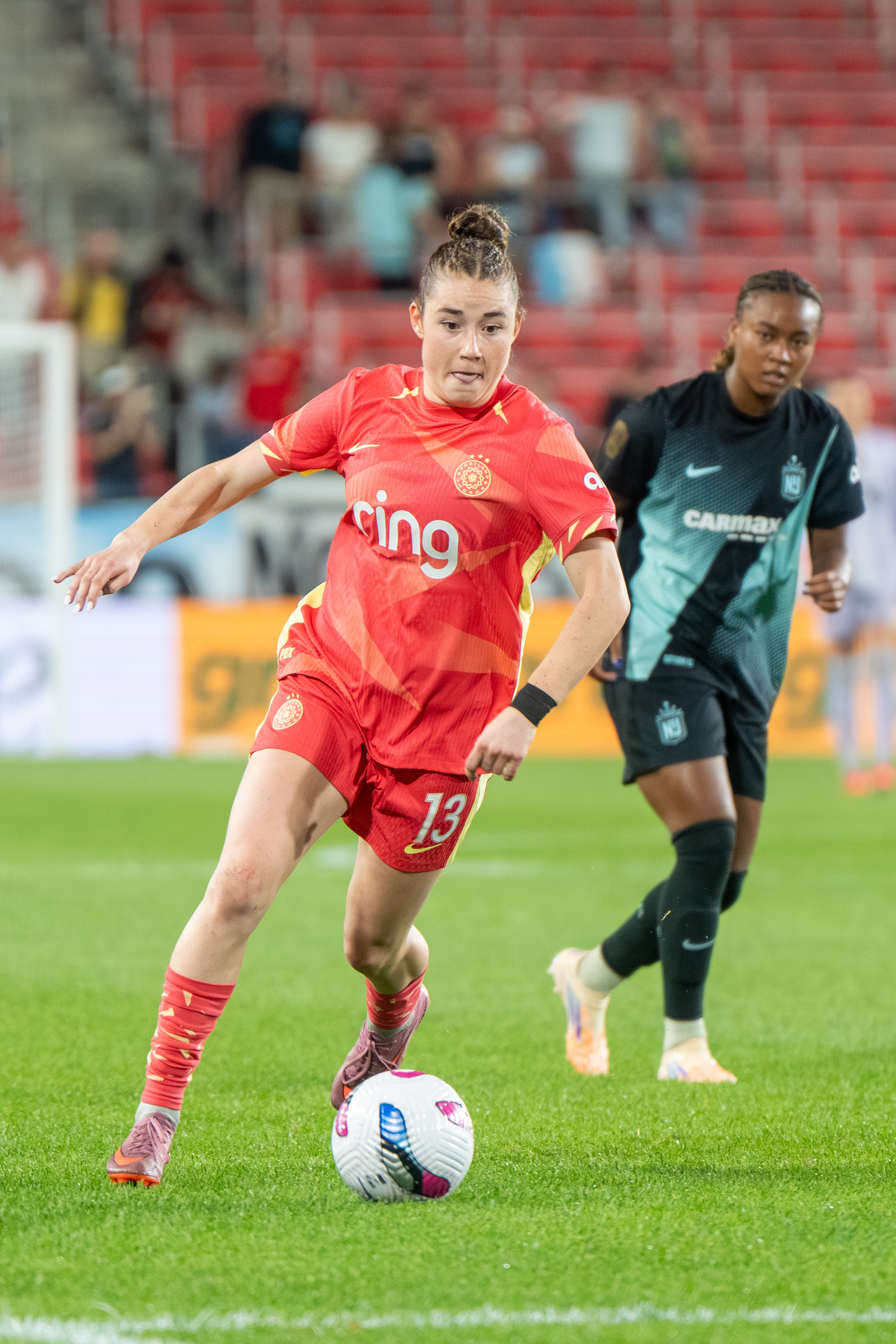
Olivia Moultrie with the Portland Thorns in 2025

In February 2019, Moultrie announced that she was turning professional, having signed a representation deal with the Wasserman Media Group. She signed with Nike to a multi-year endorsement arrangement, giving up her college eligibility in the process, and joined the Portland Thorns FC academy.

Although she trained with the Thorns' senior team and appeared in exhibition matches, she had been prevented from signing a professional contract with the club, as the National Women's Soccer League (NWSL) prohibited players under age 18, while FIFA, soccer's international governing body, generally prohibits minors from playing overseas. She made her first appearance for the senior team in an exhibition match on March 27, 2019, against the United States under-23 team.

On May 4, 2021, she filed an antitrust lawsuit against the NWSL in the United States District Court for the District of Oregon, alleging that the league, as the "only acquirer of talent in the market", violated the Sherman Antitrust Act with its age limit. The suit asked for immediate action from the court by granting a temporary restraining order against the age rule so that Moultrie can play in regular-season games during the 2021 season. On May 24, 2021, United States District Judge Karin Immergut granted a temporary restraining order, ordering the league to lift its age limit and allow Moultrie to compete for a roster spot on the Thorns, writing, the league had not "presented any compelling procompetitive reasons to justify this anticompetitive policy, nor have they shown that eliminating the Age Rule will cause any non-speculative injury to the NWSL."

In June 2021, the league informed all member teams of a discovery process for Moultrie, ultimately awarding the rights to OL Reign, who subsequently traded her to the Thorns for a third-round draft pick. On June 30, 2021, Moultrie signed a three-year contract with the Thorns, becoming the youngest player to sign a contract with an NWSL team. She made her professional debut on July 3, 2021, coming on as an 83rd-minute substitute in a 2–0 win against Racing Louisville. She made her first start and recorded her first assist on August 7 against Washington Spirit. On August 19, Moultrie scored her first professional goal, a 57th-minute direct free kick against Houston Dash, in the semifinal of the International Champions Cup.

On June 12, 2022, Moultrie scored her first NWSL league goal, becoming the youngest player to do so. On October 29, 2022, Moultrie came on as a substitute in the 2022 NWSL Championship game. The Thorns won the match earning Moultrie her first NWSL Championship.

On February 13, 2024, it was announced that Moultrie agreed to a three-year contract extension with the Thorns, lasting through the 2026 season.

On October 4, 2025, she became the youngest player in Thorns' history to score twice in a single match, recording a brace in a 2–1 comeback win over Bay FC. She played in all 26 games that season and led the team in scoring with 8 goals, 2 of them on direct free kicks. On September 15, two days before her 20th birthday, she set the NWSL record for most goals (14) scored by a teenager, surpassing Jaedyn Shaw. On November 2, 2025, she was awarded the Supporters' Player of the Year award by the independent fan group Rose City Riveters.

Moultrie started the 2026 season off by registering two goals, both of which were game-winners and one assist, earning her a spot on the March NWSL Team of the Month. After a productive first half of the season, the club released a statement on August 11 stating that she had torn her ACL, placing her on the SEI list.

== International career ==
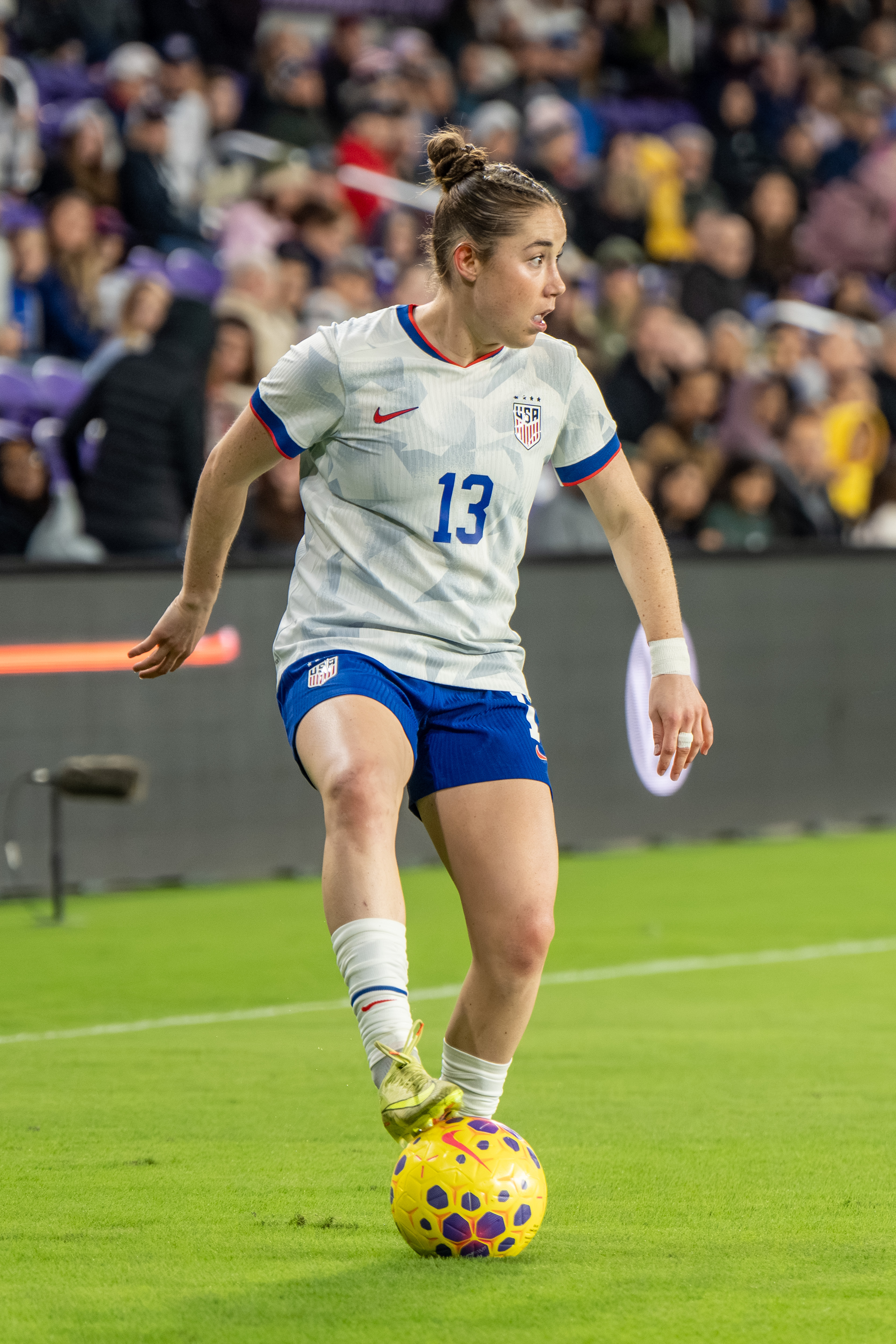
Moultrie with the United States in 2025

On February 15, 2022, Moultrie was included in the U.S. under-20 squad for the 2022 CONCACAF Women's U-20 Championship.

In October 2023, Moultrie was included in the US senior squad for the first time at the age of 18, for a double headed friendly fixture against Colombia. She earned her first cap on December 2, 2023, against China PR. She earned her first start and recorded her first two goals on February 20, 2024, against the Dominican Republic in a group stage match of the 2024 CONCACAF W Gold Cup becoming the third US women's soccer player to score two or more goals in a game at age 18 or younger after Mia Hamm and Cindy Parlow Cone. She also earned Player of the Match honors.

On October 26, 2025, she scored her second brace, this time in a friendly against Portugal.

== Career statistics ==
=== Club ===
As of March 17, 2026

Appearances and goals by club, season and competition
| Club | Season | League | | | Cup (Note: Includes the NWSL Challenge Cup) | | Playoffs (Note: Includes NWSL Playoffs) | | Total | |
| Club | Season | Division | Apps | Goals | Apps | Goals | Apps | Goals | Apps | Goals |
|---|---|---|---|---|---|---|---|---|---|---|
| Portland Thorns FC | 2021 | NWSL | 9 | 0 | 0 | 0 | 0 | 0 | 9 | 0 |
| Portland Thorns FC | 2022 | NWSL | 14 | 3 | 5 | 0 | 1 | 0 | 20 | 3 |
| Portland Thorns FC | 2023 | NWSL | 21 | 2 | 6 | 0 | 1 | 0 | 28 | 2 |
| Portland Thorns FC | 2024 | NWSL | 22 | 5 | — | | — | | 22 | 5 |
| Portland Thorns FC | 2025 | NWSL | 25 | 8 | 2 | 1 | 2 | 0 | 29 | 8 |
| Portland Thorns FC | 2026 | NWSL | 11 | 5 | 0 | 0 | 0 | 0 | 11 | 5 |
| Career total | | | 102 | 23 | 13 | 1 | 2 | 0 | 119 | 23 |

=== International ===
As of match played June 9, 2026

Appearances and goals by national team and year
| National team | Year | Apps | Goals |
|---|---|---|---|
| United States | 2023 | 2 | 0 |
| United States | 2024 | 3 | 2 |
| United States | 2025 | 6 | 3 |
| United States | 2026 | 7 | 0 |
| Total | | 18 | 5 |

Scores and results list United States's goal tally first; score column indicates score after each Moultrie goal.

List of international goals scored by Olivia Moultrie
| No. | Date | Venue | Opponent | Score | Result | Competition | Ref. |
|---|---|---|---|---|---|---|---|
| 1 | February 20, 2024 | Carson, California | Dominican Republic | 1–0 | 5–0 | 2024 CONCACAF W Gold Cup | |
| 2 | February 20, 2024 | Carson, California | Dominican Republic | 3–0 | 5–0 | 2024 CONCACAF W Gold Cup | |
| 3 | October 26, 2025 | East Hartford, Connecticut | Portugal | 1–0 | 3–1 | International friendly | |
| 4 | October 26, 2025 | East Hartford, Connecticut | Portugal | 2–1 | 3–1 | International friendly | |
| 5 | November 28, 2025 | Orlando, Florida | Italy | 1–0 | 3–0 | International friendly | |

== In popular culture ==
In 2019, shortly after turning pro, Moultrie had a small role in Nike's all-women "Dream Crazier" commercial that debuted during the 92nd Academy Awards broadcast and was narrated by Serena Williams.

== Honors ==
Portland Thorns FC

- International Champions Cup: 2021
- NWSL Championship: 2022

United States

- CONCACAF W Gold Cup: 2024
- SheBelieves Cup: 2024, 2026

United States U20

- CONCACAF Women's U-20 Championship: 2022

Individual

- U.S. Soccer Young Female Player of the Year: 2023
- Portland Thorns Supporters' Player of the Year: 2025
