= Jada Talley =

American soccer player (born 1999)

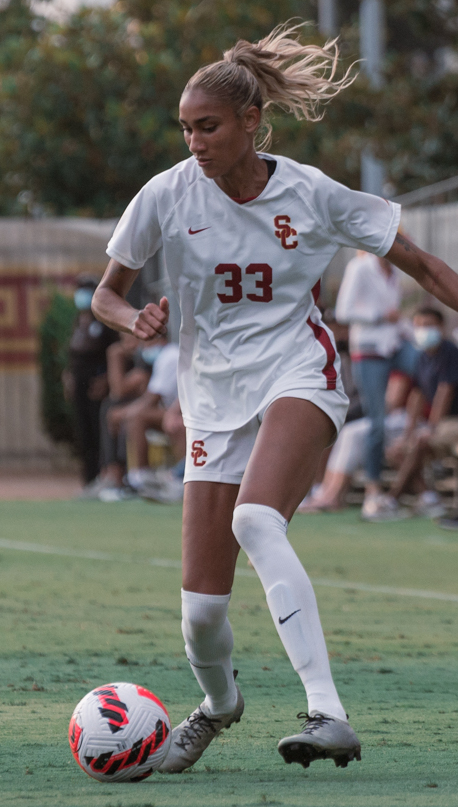
- Talley playing for USC in 2021

Personal information
- Full name: Jada Talley
- Date of birth: February 20, 1999 (age 27)
- Place of birth: Corona, California, United States
- Height: 5 ft 9 in (1.75 m)
- Position: Forward

Team information
- Current team: KuPS

Youth career
- 2013–2017: So Cal Blues

College career
Years	Team	Apps	(Gls)
2017–2021	Arizona Wildcats	73	(24)
2021	USC Trojans	18	(3)

Senior career*
Years	Team	Apps	(Gls)
2022	Kansas City Current	1	(0)
2022	Portland Thorns	0	(0)
2022–	KuPS	5	(1)
- * Club domestic league appearances and goals as of July 16, 2023

Jada Talley (born February 20, 1999) is an American professional soccer player who plays as a forward for Kuopion Palloseura (KuPS) of the Finnish Kansallinen Liiga.

Talley spent four years of her college career with the Arizona Wildcats before transferring to the USC Trojans for one season. She was drafted 31st overall in the 2022 NWSL Draft by Orlando Pride before signing short-term contracts with Kansas City Current and Portland Thorns. In July 2022, she moved to Finland to sign with KuPS.

== Early life ==
Born in Corona, California, Talley was a four-year letterwinner at Centennial High School, where she played forward for the "Huskies". As a freshman, she was named first-team All-Big XIII Division and Offensive Player of the Year. She played club soccer for the ECNL team So Cal Blues.

=== College career ===
Talley played five seasons of college soccer, joining the "Wildcats" at the University of Arizona in 2017 before transferring to the University of Southern California in 2021. As a freshman she made 18 appearances but started in only one match, scoring one goal and assisting twice. In her sophomore year, Talley started in 19 of 20 appearances and led the team in goals with seven, adding one assist. Individually, she earned All-Pac-12 Conference third-team honors. In 2019, Talley started all 20 of Arizona's games and scored a career-high and a school-record ten goals and eight assists for a combined 28 points.

She was recognized individually with All-Pac-12 first-team and United Soccer Coaches All-Pacific Region second-team selections. In 2020, Talley once again started every game, making 15 appearances during the shortened schedule as a result of the COVID-19 pandemic. She scored six goals and six assists on the way to All-Pac-12 second-team honors. In 2021, she opted to use the additional year of eligibility granted by the NCAA due to the COVID-19 pandemic, transferring within the Pac-12 to play for the USC "Trojans". With 24 goals and 16 assists, she left Arizona as fourth on both career lists in Wildcats' program history. She made 15 starts in 18 appearances as a redshirt senior for USC, scoring three goals and making two assists.

== Club career ==
Talley was automatically available for selection during the 2021 NWSL Draft as a result of exhausting three years of college eligibility. Despite not being drafted, her NWSL playing rights were picked up by Racing Louisville a week later on January 21, 2021. Having transferred to USC to contest the 2021 season and to exhaust her remaining college eligibility instead, the NWSL allowed any player added to an NWSL team's discovery list as an undrafted free agent but who would otherwise be draft eligible to be removed in order to register for the 2022 NWSL Draft. On December 18, 2021, she was selected in the third round (31st overall) of the 2022 NWSL Draft by Orlando Pride. She trained with the team during preseason and remained with Orlando during the early part of the season despite not being signed to a contract.

On May 21, 2022, Talley was signed by Kansas City Current as a short-term COVID replacement player and made her professional debut that evening as an 85th minute substitute in a 1–0 defeat by Angel City FC. She was named as an unused substitute four days later against OL Reign before the end of her short-term contract.

On June 28, 2022, Talley signed as a National Team Replacement player for Portland Thorns. She was named as an unused substitute twice in July before her contract was terminated without making an appearance.

On July 20, 2022, Talley signed a contract with the Finnish Kansallinen Liiga team Kuopion Palloseura for the remainder of the 2022 season.

== Career statistics ==
=== College summary ===
School	Season	Division	Apps	Goals
Arizona Wildcats	2017	NCAA Div. I	18	1
Arizona Wildcats	2018	NCAA Div. I	20	7
Arizona Wildcats	2019	NCAA Div. I	20	10
Arizona Wildcats	2020–21	NCAA Div. I	15	6
Arizona Wildcats	Total		73	24
USC Trojans	2021	NCAA Div. I	18	3
Career total			91	27

=== Club summary ===
As of September 28, 2022

Club	Season	League			Cup		Playoffs		Continental		Total	
Club	Season	Division	Apps	Goals	Apps	Goals	Apps	Goals	Apps	Goals	Apps	Goals
Kansas City Current	2022	NWSL	1	0	0	0	—		—		1	0
Portland Thorns	2022	NWSL	0	0	0	0	—		—		0	0
KuPS	2022	Kansallinen Liiga	5	1	0	0	—		4	0	9	1
Career total			6	1	0	0	0	0	4	0	10	1
