= Stella Spitzer =

American soccer player (born 2010)

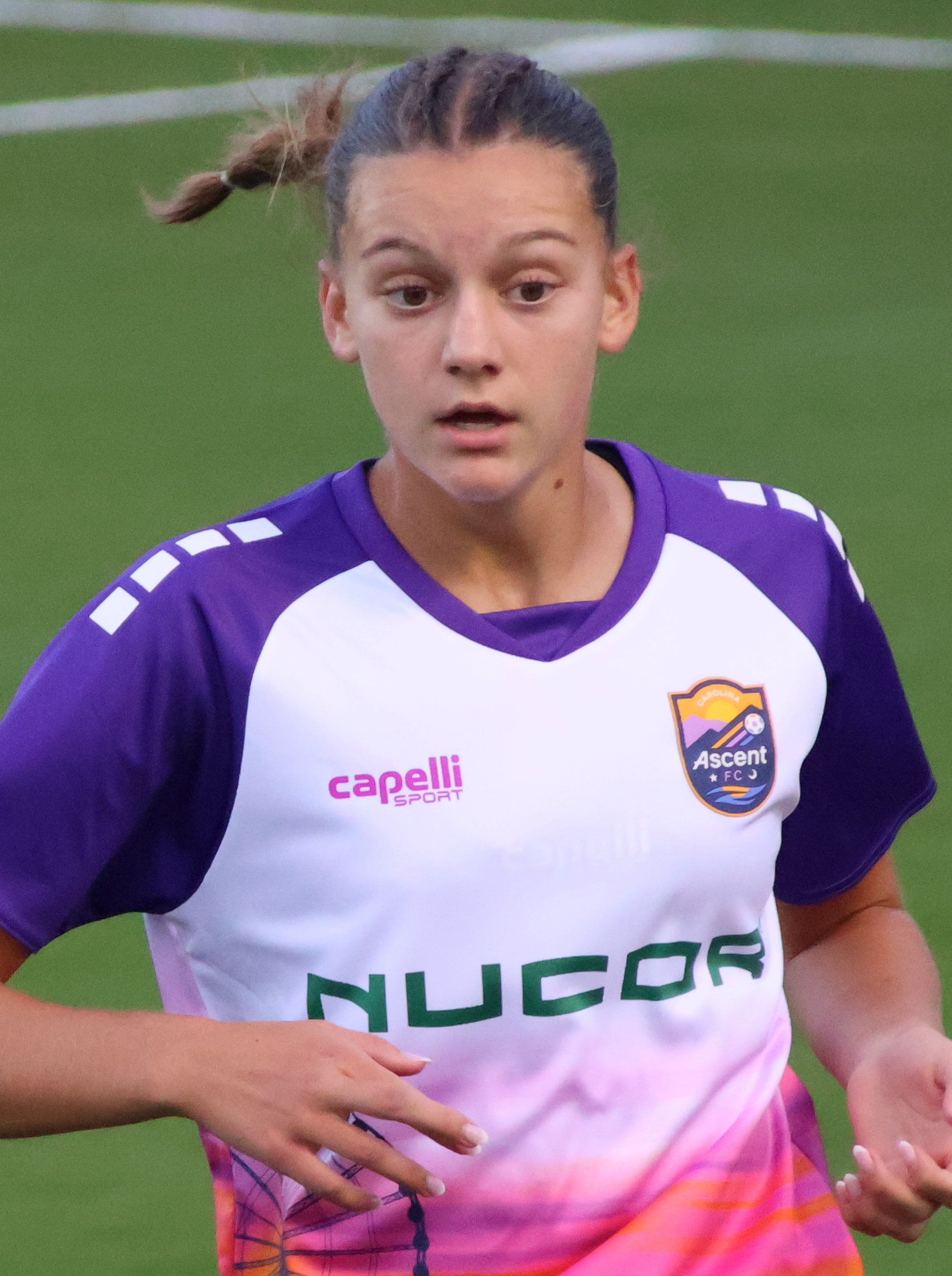
- Spitzer with the Carolina Ascent in 2025

Personal information
- Date of birth: April 4, 2010 (age 16)
- Height: 5 ft 6 in (1.68 m)
- Position: Forward

Team information
- Current team: Carolina Ascent
- Number: 70

Youth career
- 202?–2024: Solar SC

Senior career*
Years	Team	Apps	(Gls)
2024	Sioux Falls City		
2024–	Carolina Ascent	3	(0)

International career^{‡}
2026	United States U-16	2	(0)
- * Club domestic league appearances and goals as of 17:29, June 4, 2026 (UTC) ‡ National team caps and goals as of 01:54, February 25, 2026 (UTC)

Stella Spitzer (born April 4, 2010) is an American professional soccer player who plays as a forward for USL Super League club Carolina Ascent. She debuted for the Ascent at age 14, becoming the youngest player in the USL Super League, and signed professionally at age 15 in 2025.

== Early life ==
Spitzer grew up in the Columbus suburb of Lewis Center, Ohio, the daughter of Alison, a teacher, and Joel, an attorney. She began playing soccer when she was three, joining a recreational league and then a local club team. Spitzer played for Olentangy Youth Athletic Association then moved on to Columbus United in Lewis Center, Ohio. When she was ten, she moved to Dallas, Texas alone, so she could play for the ECNL club Solar SC, where she competed against girls several age groups up and boys her age and several age groups up. She was mentored by former United States international Eddie Johnson. While at Solar SC, she attended Allegiance Academy in Euless, Texas. At age 14, she joined Sioux Falls City in the amateur Women's Premier Soccer League (WPSL) in preparation for moving to the professional game. She also signed contracts with Nike Hyundai and Wasserman at the time.

== Club career ==
Carolina Ascent FC announced on June 21, 2024, that Spitzer had joined the club on an academy contract (allowing her to retain college eligibility) before the inaugural season of the USL Super League. Carolina head coach Philip Poole said of her: "The potential is there, the ingredients, the appetite, mindset, competitiveness is all there". The 14-year-old became the USL Super League's youngest player when she made her debut on October 19, entering a 2–0 win against Brooklyn FC in stoppage time. After the game, Poole said that "Stella's 99.9 percent going to miss out on college altogether. She's already at the professional level". Spitzer made just one more appearance for the rest of the season as the Ascent won the Players' Shield.

On July 25, 2025, the Ascent announced Spitzer had signed her first professional contract with the club on a long-term deal, making the 15-year-old the youngest professional in the league. She made the only appearance of her first professional season on September 25, replacing captain Taylor Porter as a 66th-minute substitute in a 1–0 loss to the Spokane Zephyr. During the 2026 FIFA World Cup, she was the only girl in a Hyundai advertisement featuring several teenagers from top clubs.

== International career ==
Spitzer was called into training camp with the under-15 team in 2024 and 2025, and the under-16 team in 2026 in Antalya, Turkiye.

== Honors and awards ==
Carolina Ascent

- USL Super League Players' Shield: 2024–25
