= Arizona Wildcats women's soccer =

American college soccer team

- Founded: 1994; 32 years ago
- University: University of Arizona
- Athletic director: Desireé Reed-Francois
- Head coach: Becca Moros (6th season)
- Conference: Big 12
- Location: Tucson, Arizona, US
- Stadium: Murphey Field (capacity: 1,462)
- Nickname: Wildcats
- Colors: Cardinal and navy
Home	Away

NCAA tournament Round of 16
- 2005, 2015

NCAA tournament Round of 32
- 2005, 2014, 2015, 2017, 2018, 2019

NCAA tournament appearances
- 2004, 2005, 2014, 2015, 2017, 2018, 2019

Conference regular season championships
- Pac-12 Conference; 2004

The Arizona Wildcats women's soccer represents the University of Arizona in the Big 12 Conference of NCAA Division I soccer. Prior to the 1994 season, the team participated as a club sport. The team is coached by Becca Moros and has made the NCAA Tournament 7 times. The team plays its home games at Murphey Field at Mulcahy Stadium, which was built in 1996.

== Results by season ==
Season Results
Year	Coach	Overall record	Conference record	Conference standing	Postseason
(Pac-10 Conference) (1994–2010)
1994	Lisa Fraser	3–11–0	0–0–0	–	–
1995	Lisa Fraser	6–11–0	1–6–0		–
1996	Lisa Fraser	5–13–1	0–7–0		–
1997	Lisa Fraser	8–11–1	2–7–0		–
1998	Lisa Fraser	3–12–2	0–8–1		–
1999	Lisa Fraser	7–10–2	1–7–1		–
2000	Kathy Klein	3–15–2	0–8–1		–
2001	Kathy Klein	5–12–1	2–7–0		–
2002	Kathy Klein	6–12–1	1–8–0		–
2003	Dan Tobias	6–11–2	2–6–1		–
2004	Dan Tobias	15–6–0	6–3–0	T-1st	NCAA 1st Round
2005	Dan Tobias	11–8–3	4–4–1		NCAA Round of 16
2006	Dan Tobias	8–10–2	1–6–2		–
2007	Dan Tobias	6–13–1	1–7–1		–
2008	Dan Tobias	9–11–0	2–7–0		–
2009	Dan Tobias/Lisa Oyen/John Galas	4–15–1	1–8–0		–
2010	Lisa Oyen	5–13–2	1–8–0		–
(Pac-12 Conference) (2011–2023)
2011	Lisa Oyen	1–16–2	1–9–1		–
2012	Lisa Oyen	6–11–3	2–7–2		–
2013	Tony Amato	9–7–4	4–6–1		–
2014	Tony Amato	11–8–2	4–6–1		NCAA Round of 32
2015	Tony Amato	14–6–2	6–4–1	T-4th	NCAA Round of 16
2016	Tony Amato	9–9–1	4–7–0	7th	–
2017	Tony Amato	11–5–4	7–2–2	4th	NCAA Round of 32
2018	Tony Amato	13–6–2	5–4–2	T-5th	NCAA Round of 32
2019	Tony Amato	12–7–1	5–5–1	7th	NCAA Round of 32
2020–21	Tony Amato	9–5–1	4–5–1		NCAA Round of 32
2021	Becca Moros	5–13–0	2–9–0	11th	–
2022	Becca Moros	8–7–3	5–5–1	T-6th	–
2023	Becca Moros	6–8–5	3–6–2	8th	–
(Big 12 Conference) (2024–present)
2024	Becca Moros	11–6–2	6–4–1	7th	—
2025	Becca Moros	7–11–1	2–8–1	14th	—
2026	Becca Moros	3–4–2	0–0–1	TBD	
Totals: 32 Years – 7 Coaches		244–322–55 (.437)		1 Conference championships	7 Postseason appearances

== Current roster ==
As of August 2026

Note: Flags indicate national team as defined under FIFA eligibility rules; some limited exceptions apply. Players may hold more than one non-FIFA nationality.

No.	Pos.	Nation	Player
00	GK	USA	Elesha Magley
0	GK	USA	Laurynn Ziller
1	GK	CAN	Sofia Cortes-Browne
2	FW	USA	Jessica Bedolla
4	DF	USA	Zoe Mendiola
5	MF	USA	Trinity Dorsey
6	MF	USA	Shanti Weddington
7	MF	USA	Leilani Cortez-Ramirez
8	DF	USA	Amanda Maynard
9	MF	USA	Lily Boydstun
11	DF	USA	Thaleia Tsintikidou
12	DF	USA	Aranda Hurge

No.	Pos.	Nation	Player
13	FW	USA	Kyleigh Johnson
14	MF	USA	Ally Brown
15	FW	USA	Grace Smith
16	DF	USA	Alexa Khan
17	FW	USA	Mireya Stephenson
18	FW	USA	Lainey Swanson
19	DF	USA	Marissa Arnst
20	MF	USA	Emerson Stoft
22	MF	USA	Amiya Warner
24	MF	USA	Ashley May
27	DF	USA	Evie McCarthy
74	FW	USA	Ella Weathersby
88	MF	USA	Whitney Reinhardt

== Awards ==
Player	Award	Season
Mallory Miller	Pac-10 Player of the Year	2005
Sheaffer Skadsen	Pac-12 Scholar-Athlete of the Year	2015
Hope Hisey	Pac-12 Scholar-Athlete of the Year	2023

Player	Award	Season
Dan Tobias	Pac-10 Coach of the Year	2004

=== All-Pac-12 Honors ===
Player	First team All-Pac-12
Inger Airheart	1997
Candice Wilks	2003
Lindsey Peeples	2004
Candice Wilks	2004
Mallory Miller	2005
Gianna DeSaverio	2006
Jazmin Ponce	2012
Jazmin Ponce	2013
Gabi Stoian	2015
Jada Talley	2019

Player	Second team All-Pac-12
Christine Keeley	1995
Christine Keeley	1996
Kelly Nelson	2002
Lindsey Peeples	2003
Mallory Miller	2004
Erin Bevacqua	2005
London King	2006
Katy Heath	2007
Gabi Stoian	2014
Lainey Burdett	2017
Morgan McGarry	2017
Jill Aguilera	2020
Jada Talley	2020
Jill Aguilera	2021

Player	Third team All-Pac-12
Gabi Stoian	2017
Lainey Burdett	2018
Jada Talley	2018
Amanda Porter	2018
Hope Hisey	2022

=== All-Big 12 Honors ===
Player	First team All-Big 12

Player	Second team All-Big 12
Gianna Christiansen	2024
Nicole Dallin	2024
Aranda Hurge	2024

Note

- ‡ indicates player was Pac-12 Player of the Year
- † indicates player was Pac-12 Freshman of the Year

All-Pac-12 Freshman Honors

Player	Third team All-Pac-12
London King	2005
Jacqueline Broussard	2006
Jacqueline Zinke	2007
Renae Cuellar	2008
Jazmin Ponce	2010
Gabi Stoian	2014
Emily Knous	2018
Hope Hisey	2019
Sami Baytosh	2022

== Individual Records ==
Career Goals
Player	Years	Goals
Jill Aguilera	2017–21	33
Mallory Miller	2002–05	32
Gabi Stoian	2014–17	29
Nikki Jones	1995-98	25
Jada Talley	2017–20	24

Season Goals
Player	Year	Goals
Mallory Miller	2005	19
Gabi Stoian	2014	13
Kelly Nelson	2002	13
Chrissy Sanford	1999	11
Christine Keeley	1995	11

Career Assists
Player	Years	Assists
Jaden DeGracie	2013–16	24
Gabi Stoian	2014–2017	22
Mallory Miller	2002-05	19
Jada Talley	2017–20	16
Jill Aguilera	2017–21	15

Season Assists
Player	Year	Assists
Mallory Miller	2005	9
Jada Talley	2019	8
Jaden Degracie	2013	8
Gabi Stoian	2015	8
4 Tied	Various Years	7

Career Points
Player	Years	Points
Mallory Miller	2002–05	83
Jill Aguilera	2017–21	81
Gabi Stoian	2014–17	80
Nikki Jones	1995-98	64
Jada Talley	2017–20	64

Season Points
Player	Year	Points
Mallory Miller	2005	43
Gabi Stoian	2014	33
Jada Talley	2019	28
Kelly Nelson	2002	27
Chrissy Sanford	1999	27
Christine Keeley	1995	27

Career Saves
Player	Years	Saves
Hope Hisey	2019–23	366
Jen Weibel	1994–96	345
Gabby Kaufman	2012–14	306
Inger Airheart	1997-00	292
Lainey Burdett	2015–18	268

Season Saves
Player	Year	Saves
McCall Smith	2005	128
Jen Weibel	1995	128
Jen Weibel	1994	128
Chelsea McIntyre	2006	109
2 Tied	Various Years	108
