= Giovanna DeMarco =

American soccer player (born 1999)

Personal information
- Full name: Giovanna Christina DeMarco
- Date of birth: July 9, 1999 (age 27)
- Height: 5 ft 6 in (1.68 m)
- Position: Midfielder

Youth career
- FC Bucks
- Match Fit Academy ECNL

College career
Years	Team	Apps	(Gls)
2018–2022	Wake Forest Demon Deacons	74	(11)

Senior career*
Years	Team	Apps	(Gls)
2023	San Diego Wave	0	(0)
2024–2026	Carolina Ascent	16	(0)
- * Club domestic league appearances and goals as of 17:46, June 12, 2026 (UTC)

Giovanna Christina DeMarco (born July 9, 1999) is an American professional soccer player who plays as a midfielder. She played college soccer for the Wake Forest Demon Deacons before being selected by San Diego Wave FC in the fourth round of the 2024 NWSL Draft. She has previously been a member of USL Super League club Carolina Ascent FC.

== Early life ==
DeMarco grew up in Gwynedd Valley, Pennsylvania. She attended William Penn Charter School, where she played varsity soccer from 8th grade to her senior year of high school. With Penn Charter, DeMarco made All-State honors and left as the all-time point leader at the school. She started off playing club soccer for FC Bucks before moving to Match Fit Academy as a high school freshman.

== College career ==
After making a verbal commitment in 2017, DeMarco played collegiately for the Wake Forest Demon Deacons from 2018 to 2022. She scored her first college goal on August 26, 2018, in a 3–2 victory over Charleston. The end of her first year of college was punctuated by recognition on the 2018 ACC All-Freshman Team. She became a team captain for Wake Forest at the start of her junior year and held on to the role through her remaining three seasons of college. In her final year with the Demon Deacons, She operated as a midfielder and a forward, scoring four goals and recording two assists.

== Club career ==
=== San Diego Wave ===
In January 2023, DeMarco was selected in the 4th round of the 2023 NWSL Draft by San Diego Wave FC. After training with the Wave during preseason, she signed a one-year contract with the club. She made her professional debut and first start on May 31, 2023, playing 90 minutes in a 3–0 NWSL Challenge Cup defeat to OL Reign. She only played once more in 2023, starting in a 2–1 challenge cup loss against Angel City FC. DeMarco did not make any regular season appearances in her rookie season as the Wave topped the table, winning the NWSL Shield. At the end of the season, she departed from the Wave upon the expiration of her rookie contract.

After leaving San Diego, DeMarco spent time training with the North Carolina Courage as a non-roster invitee during 2024 preseason. While she did not sign a contract with the Courage, DeMarco's performances in preseason earned her a spot on the NC Courage squad for The Soccer Tournament (TST), a 7v7 tournament in Cary, North Carolina. The Courage advanced to the tournament final before being defeated by the US Women.

=== Carolina Ascent ===
On June 19, 2024, DeMarco joined USL Super League club Carolina Ascent FC as the team's inaugural signing. She was part of the starting lineup that faced off against DC Power FC in the team's first-ever match and recorded the first victory in league history. She made 16 appearances across the season, helping the Ascent win the inaugural USL Super League Players' Shield. Carolina were then eliminated in the first round of the playoffs by Fort Lauderdale United FC.

DeMarco missed the entirety of the 2025–26 season after picking up a leg injury in 2025. She watched on from the sidelines as Carolina finished third in the regular season before being defeated in the championship match by Lexington SC. At the end of the season, the Ascent announced DeMarco's departure from the club.

== International career ==
DeMarco has represented the United States at youth level on the U-18 and U19 youth national teams. In February 2018, she was called up to the U-18 team to participate in the Women's U-19 La Manga 12 Nations Tournament.

== Career statistics ==
=== Club ===
As of June 12, 2026

Appearances and goals by club, season and competition
Club	Season	League			Cup (Note: Includes the NWSL Challenge Cup)		Playoffs (Note: Includes NWSL Playoffs and USL Super League playoffs)		Total	
Club	Season	Division	Apps	Goals	Apps	Goals	Apps	Goals	Apps	Goals
San Diego Wave FC	2023	NWSL	0	0	2	0	0	0	2	0
Carolina Ascent FC	2024–25	USL Super League	16	0	—		0	0	16	0
Carolina Ascent FC	2025–26	USL Super League	0	0	—		0	0	0	0
Carolina Ascent FC	Total		16	0	0	0	0	0	18	0
Career total			16	0	2	0	0	0	18	0

== Honors ==
San Diego Wave

- NWSL Shield: 2023

Carolina Ascent

- USL Super League Players' Shield: 2024–25
