= Jenna Butler (soccer) =

American soccer player (born 2000)

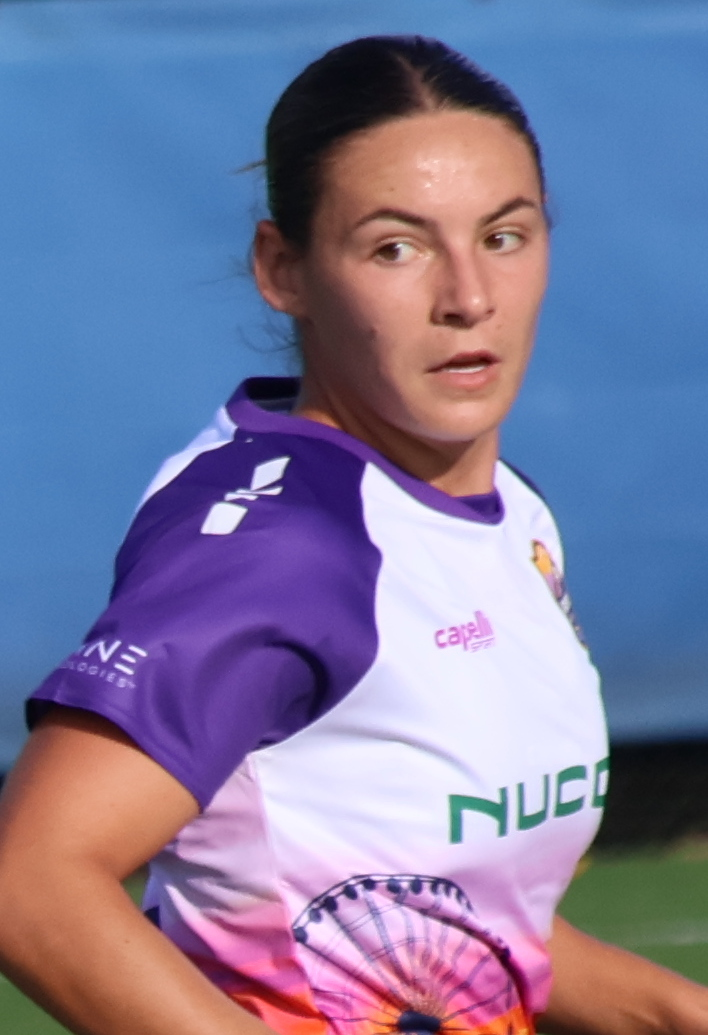
- Butler with the Carolina Ascent in 2025

Personal information
- Full name: Jenna Carolene Butler
- Date of birth: January 18, 2000 (age 26)
- Height: 5 ft 10 in (1.78 m)
- Position: Center back

Team information
- Current team: Carolina Ascent
- Number: 5

College career
Years	Team	Apps	(Gls)
2018–2022	NC State Wolfpack	86	(7)

Senior career*
Years	Team	Apps	(Gls)
2024	Carolina Ascent (USL W)	10	(2)
2024	Washington Spirit	1	(0)
2025–	Carolina Ascent	41	(3)
- * Club domestic league appearances and goals as of 17:23, June 4, 2026 (UTC)

Jenna Carolene Butler (born January 18, 2000) is an American professional soccer player who plays as a center back for USL Super League club Carolina Ascent. She played college soccer for the NC State Wolfpack. After a brief stint with the Washington Spirit, she joined the Carolina Ascent and was named the club's Player of the Year after the 2025–26 season.

== Early life ==
Butler grew up in Gainesville, Virginia. She played club soccer for Prince William Courage, Northern Virginia SC, Fredericksburg FC, and FC Virginia. She committed to the NC State Wolfpack during her junior year.

== College career ==
Butler played five seasons for the NC State Wolfpack, starting in 86 games and scoring 7 goals as a center back. In her freshman season in 2018, she played in two NCAA tournament wins, scoring the lone goal of the opening round against Northwestern and taking out seven seed Santa Clara on penalties, but she missed the round of 16 loss to UCLA due to injury. After suffering a season-ending injury as a sophomore in 2019, she had a short junior season due to the COVID-19 pandemic in 2020. She started every game over the following two full seasons, making use of the extra year of NCAA eligibility granted due to the pandemic, and helped the Wolfpack to fifth and sixth consecutive NCAA tournament appearances, not counting the pandemic year. She graduated from NC State with a degree in industrial and systems engineering in 2022.

After graduating, Butler declared for the 2023 NWSL Draft but was not selected. The following year, she played for the Carolina Ascent's USL W League side, starting all 10 games and scoring 2 goals, and was named in the league's second-team Team of the Year.

== Club career ==
=== Washington Spirit ===
The NWSL's Washington Spirit announced on July 18, 2024, that they had signed Butler to first professional deal on a national team replacement contract. She made her professional debut three days later, starting and playing the full 90 minutes in a 2–1 win over Mexican club Guadalajara in the NWSL x Liga MX Femenil Summer Cup. She went on to play the entirety of the Spirit's three Summer Cup games and appeared as a substitute in their friendly against Arsenal. On August 23, the Spirit re-signed Butler for the remainder of the season. On October 6, she made her NWSL regular-season debut against the Orlando Pride as a stoppage-time substitute for the injured Andi Sullivan. She was unused in the playoffs as the Spirit reached the 2024 NWSL Championship, losing to the Orlando Pride.

=== Carolina Ascent ===
On January 16, 2025, Butler returned to the Carolina Ascent – now their professional side – during the inaugural USL Super League season. She made her debut in the spring opener, starting in a 2–1 win over Lexington SC on February 15. On March 8, she scored her first professional goal with a header from Jill Aguilera's set piece in a 2–1 victory over the Spokane Zephyr. She played every minute of the Ascent's games in the spring, helping secure the Players' Shield with the best record in the league. She was named in the USL Super League Team of the Month twice in her first four months. In the playoff semifinals, the Ascent lost 2–1 to Fort Lauderdale United in extra time.

Butler's minutes streak lasted until September 24, 2025, when she was handed a straight red card for her foul on a stoppage-time breakaway in a 1–0 loss to the Spokane Zephyr. Missing just one match in the 2025–26 season, she led the Ascent in minutes played and led the league in clearances. Following a season-ending injury to Sydney Studer, her partner in central defense, Butler organized the Ascent defense through a club record 12-game unbeaten streak to end the season. Carolina finished third in the league and defeated Sporting JAX 1–0 in the playoff semifinals to reach their first league final, where they lost 3–1 to Lexington SC in extra time. At the end of the season, she was named the Ascent's Player of the Year.

== Personal life ==
Butler got engaged to former NC State and Campbell soccer player Caleb Martinez in August 2025.

== Honors and awards ==
Carolina Ascent

- USL Super League Players' Shield: 2024–25

Individual

- Carolina Ascent Player of the Year: 2025–26
- Second-team USL W League Team of the Year: 2024
