= Sydney Studer =

American soccer player (born 2000)

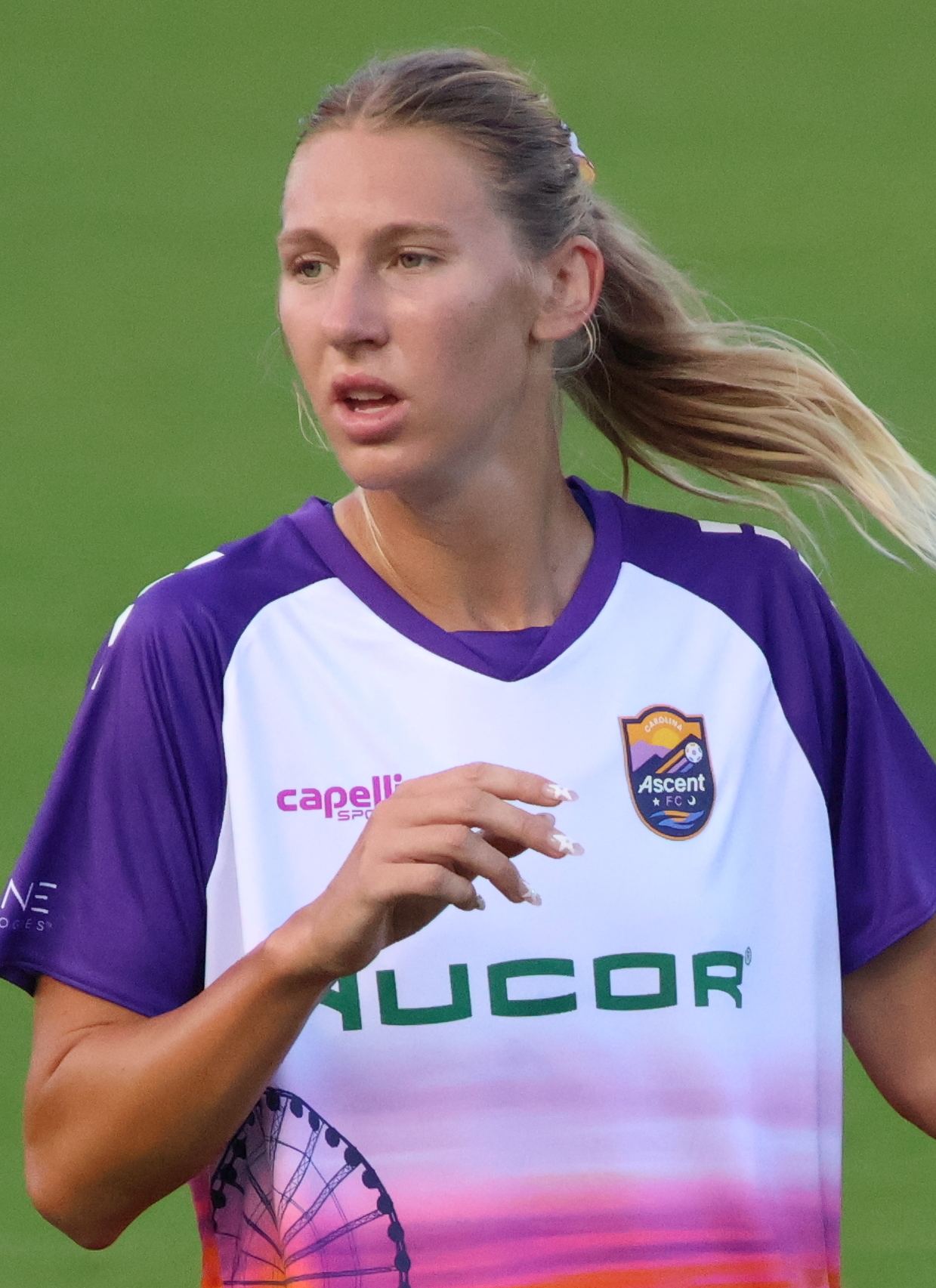
- Studer with the Carolina Ascent in 2025

Personal information
- Full name: Sydney Nicole Studer
- Date of birth: November 17, 2000 (age 25)
- Height: 5 ft 11 in (1.80 m)
- Positions: Center back; defensive midfielder

Team information
- Current team: Carolina Ascent
- Number: 12

Youth career
- Legends USSDA 99

College career
| Years | Team | Apps | (Gls) |
| 2018–2021 | Oregon State Beavers | 53 | (11) |
| 2021–2022 | Washington State Cougars | 39 | (5) |

Senior career*
| Years | Team | Apps | (Gls) |
| 2024– | Carolina Ascent | 44 | (4) |

International career
| 2018–2019 | United States U-18 | | |
| 2020 | United States U-23 | | |
- * Club domestic league appearances and goals as of 02:39, April 12, 2026 (UTC)

Sydney Nicole Studer (born November 17, 2000) is an American professional soccer player who plays as a center back or defensive midfielder for USL Super League club Carolina Ascent. She played college soccer for the Oregon State Beavers and the Washington State Cougars.

== Early life ==
A native of Eastvale, California, Studer started playing soccer at the age of 3. She eventually started playing for Legends USSDA 99 and the Roosevelt High School team, operating as a midfielder. With Roosevelt, Studer was named to the All-Conference First Team, the California All-State team, and won the team's MVP award. Studer did not play high school soccer as a senior.

== College career ==
=== Oregon State Beavers ===
Studer kicked off her collegiate career with the Oregon State Beavers. She played in 18 games as a freshman, starting 16 of them. She scored her first college goal on October 4, 2018, netting the game-winner in a 2–1 victory over the California Golden Bears.

As a sophomore, Studer moved to the backline and led the team in minutes played, racking up 1,767 across the season. In her third year at OSU, Studer won Pac-12 Second Team, All-Pacific Region Second Team, and team MVP honors. She was also included on the TopDrawerSoccer team of the week in February 2018, and later, named the Pac-12 Defensive Player of the Week after scoring a hat-trick of headers on April 4. She finished her three years at Oregon State with a total of 53 appearances and 11 goals.

=== Washington State Cougars ===
After finishing up her junior season at Oregon State, Studer transferred to Washington State University and started playing with the Washington State Cougars in 2021's fall season. In her first season as a Cougar, Studer was named to the All-Region Second Team and All-Pac 12 Third Team. She had a highly successful playing period at the end of the season, scoring the game-tying goal against champions UCLA and generating a three-game streak of assists (two of which were game-winners). Studer wrapped up her college career by starting all but one game in Washington State's 2022 campaign. She also scored three goals, including one against her former team, Oregon State.

== Club career ==
On May 31, 2024, Studer signed her first professional contract for Carolina Ascent FC in the lead-up to the inaugural USL Super League season. She made her professional debut in the Ascent's first-ever match, coming on as a substitute for the injured Jill Aguilera in the 19th minute of the game. Studer scored her first goal with the Ascent on September 15, helping Carolina beat the Spokane Zephyr by a 2–0 scoreline. At the end of September, she was named to the USL Super League Team of the Month after leading the league in clearances and winning 70% of her duels. She carried on her form to the second half of the season, starting all 6 games of an Ascent win streak in the spring and receiving her second team of the month honor at the end of April 2025. Her efforts in Carolina's top-of-the-table finish earned her a spot on the inaugural USL Super League All-League First Team, alongside teammates Mia Corbin and Jill Aguilera.

Studer was a staple for the Ascent to start off the 2025–26 season, earning two team of the month honors in the first half of the campaign. On February 21, 2026, she scored both goals in a 2–0 win over Dallas Trinity FC, both of which came off of Jill Aguilera corner kicks. After starting in all but one of her 21 appearances across the season, Studer suffered a season-ending lower-body injury in April 2026. She still managed to earn a spot on the USL Super League All-League First Team for the second year in a row despite missing Carolina's remaining 7 regular season matches and 2 playoff fixtures.

== International career ==
Studer received call-ups to the USWNT U-18 squad in 2018 and 2019. She was also named to the U-23 team in 2022 for a training camp in Austin, Texas.

== Career statistics ==
=== Club ===
As of April 11, 2026

Appearances and goals by club, season and competition
| Club | Season | League | | | Cup | | Playoffs | | Total | |
| Club | Season | Division | Apps | Goals | Apps | Goals | Apps | Goals | Apps | Goals |
|---|---|---|---|---|---|---|---|---|---|---|
| Carolina Ascent FC | 2024–25 | USL Super League | 23 | 1 | — | | 1 | 0 | 24 | 1 |
| Carolina Ascent FC | 2025–26 | USL Super League | 21 | 3 | — | | — | | 21 | 3 |
| Career total | | | 44 | 4 | 0 | 0 | 1 | 0 | 45 | 4 |

== Honors and awards ==
Carolina Ascent

- USL Super League Players' Shield: 2024–25

Individual

- USL Super League All-League First Team: 2024–25, 2025–26
- Second-team All-Pac-12: 2020
- Third-team All-Pac-12: 2021
