= Margie Detrizio =

American soccer player (born 2001)

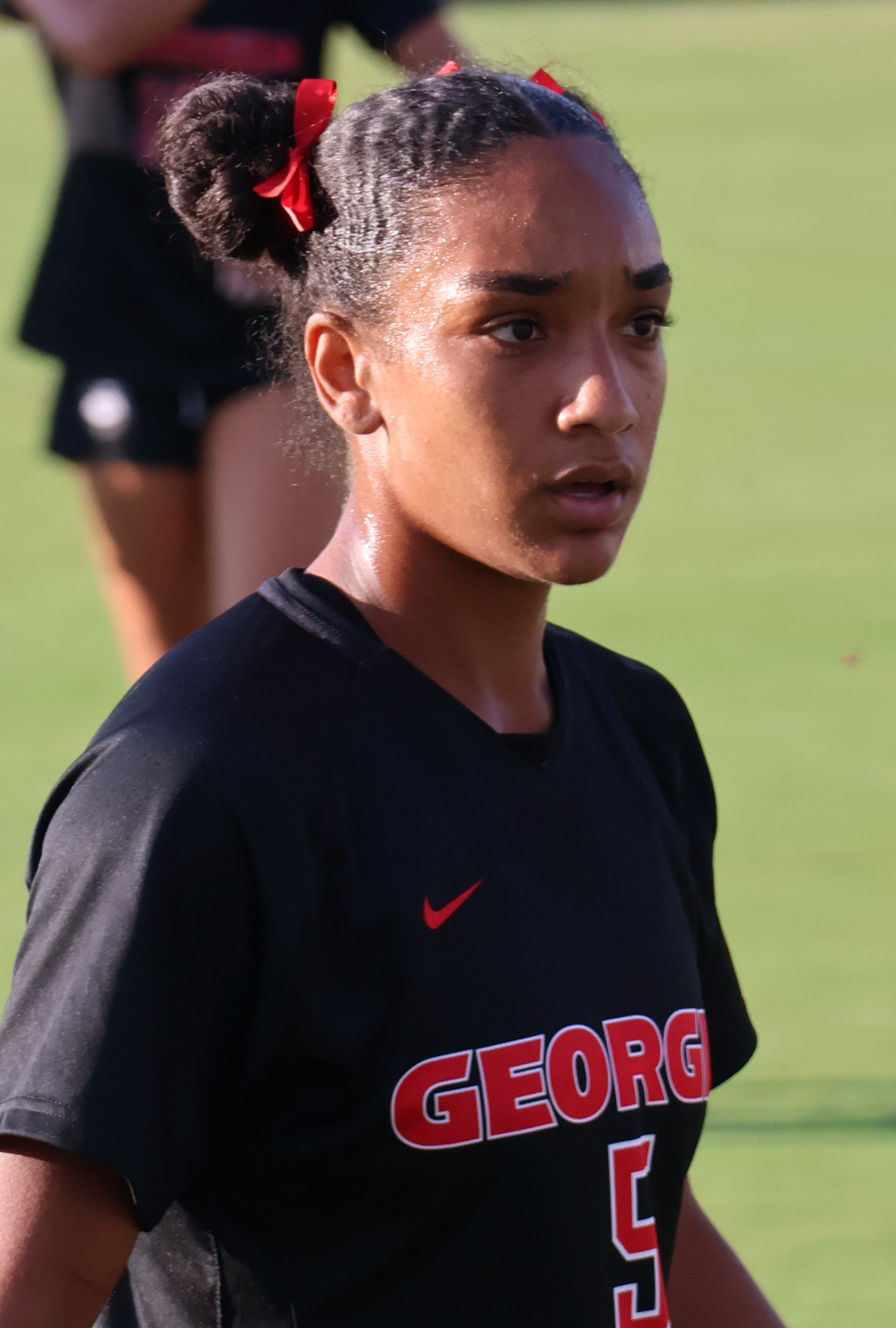
- Detrizio with Georgia in 2024

Personal information
- Full name: Margaret Joy Detrizio-Parrett
- Date of birth: September 17, 2001 (age 25)
- Place of birth: Chandler, Arizona, U.S.
- Height: 5 ft 10 in (1.78 m)
- Position: Forward

Team information
- Current team: Braga
- Number: 14

Youth career
- Utah Royals USDA

College career
Years	Team	Apps	(Gls)
2021–2023	Washington State Cougars	71	(26)
2024	Georgia Bulldogs	21	(9)

Senior career*
Years	Team	Apps	(Gls)
2025	Washington Spirit	2	(0)
2025	DC Power FC	10	(0)
2026–	Braga	6	(1)
- * Club domestic league appearances and goals as of 03:50, July 5, 2026 (UTC)

Margaret Joy Detrizio-Parrett (born September 17, 2001) is an American professional soccer player who plays as a forward for Portuguese Campeonato Nacional Feminino club Braga. She played college soccer for the Washington State Cougars and the Georgia Bulldogs before starting her professional career with the Washington Spirit of the National Women’s Soccer League and DC Power FC of the USL Super League.

== Early life ==
Detrizio was born and raised in Chandler, Arizona, alongside two siblings. She attended Basha High School, where she played basketball instead of soccer in her freshman year. The following year, she switched sports and led Basha's soccer team to the state championship tournament. Her 24 goals and 10 assists in 20 appearances were some of the highest numbers across Arizona. A member of the Utah Royals' U.S. Soccer Development Academy team, Detrizio opted to focus exclusively on club soccer in her remaining two years of high school.

== College career ==
=== Washington State Cougars ===
As a freshman for the Washington State Cougars, Detrizio was mainly a super-sub, starting in only 2 of her 12 appearances. She led Washington State's freshman group with 3 goals and 2 assists across the 2021 spring campaign. The following season, Detrizio played in all 21 of the Cougars' games. On October 31, 2021, she earned a penalty and scored her first career brace to help her team secure a comeback victory over Oregon State.

In her junior year at Washington State, Detrizio started all but one match. Her 6 assists were the most on her team, and her 11 goals were both the highest for Washington State and third-highest across the Pac-12 Conference. Detrizio found herself in front of net frequently across 2022, recording both the greatest number of shots and shots on target in the Pac-12. Detrizio's offensive success earned her a spot on the All-Pac-12 second team and all-region third team. As a senior, Detrizio started all 19 matches and led the Cougars in goals and assists for the second year in a row. She was named third-team All-Pac-12 at the end of the season. Detrizio departed from Washington State with top-ten career statistics in multiple WSU program offensive records.

=== Georgia Bulldogs ===
Ahead of the 2024 season, Detrizio transferred to the University of Georgia. She entered the season as a Southeastern Conference Preseason Watchlist honoree, alongside six of her new Georgia teammates. Detrizio went on to appear in 21 matches for the Bulldogs and lead the team in goals scored, with 9. In the first round of the NCAA tournament, she registered a goal and shot off the goalframe, but Georgia were ultimately defeated by Colorado, 3–2.

== Club career ==
Detrizio spent the 2025 NWSL preseason as a trialist with the Portland Thorns and scored a goal against the Houston Dash in the Coachella Valley Invitational on February 22. She ended up signing her first professional deal with the Washington Spirit, penning an injury replacement contract with the club on March 5, 2025. Two days later, Detrizio was an unused substitute as the Spirit beat the Orlando Pride on penalties to win the 2025 NWSL Challenge Cup title. On March 15, Detrizio made her professional debut, coming on as a second-half substitute for Leicy Santos in the Spirit's regular season-opening victory over Houston. She made one more appearance for Washington before her contract expired.

On July 1, 2025, fellow Washingtonian club DC Power FC announced that they had signed Detrizio ahead of the USL Super League's second season of play. Detrizio made her Super League debut on August 23, coming on late in DC Power's season opener against Sporting Club Jacksonville. She made 10 appearances across the first half of the season before departing from DC on a mutual contract termination on January 6, 2026.

Twenty days after leaving DC Power FC, Detrizio signed for Portuguese Campeonato Nacional Feminino club Braga on a contract through 2027. She joined fellow American Sydney Masur, who had signed for Braga on the same day. On 3 May 2026, she netted her first professional goal, opening the scoring in a 2–1 win over Racing Power FC. She went on to make 7 appearances in her first season in Portugal.

== Honors ==
Washington Spirit

- NWSL Challenge Cup: 2025

Individual

- Second-team All-Pac-12: 2022
- Third-team All-Pac-12: 2023
