= Natalie Beckman =

American soccer player

Personal information
- Full name: Natalie Katherine Beckman
- Date of birth: March 25, 2000 (age 26)
- Place of birth: Aurora, Colorado, United States
- Height: 5 ft 2 in (1.57 m)
- Position: Defender

Youth career
- –2018: Colorado Storm
- 2015–2018: Grandview High School Wolves

College career
Years	Team	Apps	(Gls)
2018–2021	Denver Pioneers	83	(21)

Senior career*
Years	Team	Apps	(Gls)
2022–2023	Portland Thorns FC	6	(0)
2024	Sparta Prague	16	(8)
- * Club domestic league appearances and goals as of December 21, 2024

Natalie Katherine Beckman (born March 25, 2000) is an American professional soccer player who plays as a defender.

== Youth career ==
Beckman was born and raised in Aurora, Colorado, and played youth soccer for Elite Clubs National League club Colorado Storm. She also played as a midfielder for Grandview High School of Aurora, winning state championships in 2015, 2016, and 2018, and appearing in the state final four in 2017.

== College career ==
On August 12, 2015, Beckman committed to playing NCAA Division I women's soccer for the University of Denver Pioneers, where she played primarily as a left winger. During her career she made 83 total appearances, starting all but two, and scored 21 goals and a program-record 47 assists. In her final season with the Pioneers, Beckman scored five goals and a single-season program record of 18 assists, finishing second in the nation in both assists and assists per match. She graduated from Denver with a degree in mathematics and minors in business analytics, psychology, and Spanish. During Beckman's time with the Pioneers, the team won three Summit League championships, and she was named league offensive player of the season twice.

== Club career ==
=== Portland Thorns FC, 2022–2023 ===
NWSL club Portland Thorns FC selected Beckman with the 48th overall pick in the 2022 NWSL Draft. On March 15, 2022, Thorns FC announced that the club had signed Beckman to a one-year contract with an option for an additional year.

On March 26, 2022, Beckman made her professional debut in a 2022 NWSL Challenge Cup match against San Diego Wave FC as a second-half substitute. On June 12, 2022, Beckman made her regular-season debut for Thorns FC in a match against Houston Dash as a 64th-minute substitute.

Thorns FC exercised its option on Beckman's contract for a second year ahead of the 2023 season. Beckman moved from playing forward to the defense in her second season.

She was out of contract in November 2023.

=== AC Sparta Prague, 2024 ===
On 1 March 2024, Beckman signed a contract with Czech Women's First League club Sparta Prague. After 16 caps, 8 goals in the league, and her Champions League debut against Linköping, Beckman, in December 2024, left the club.

== Honors ==
- NWSL Championship: 2022
