= Lizette Rodríguez =

Mexican footballer (born 1986)

Personal information
- Full name: Lizette Montserrat Rodríguez Cisneros
- Date of birth: 10 July 1986 (age 40)
- Place of birth: Guadalajara, Jalisco, Mexico
- Height: 1.57 m (5 ft 2 in)
- Position: Left-back

Senior career*
Years	Team	Apps	(Gls)
2016–2020	Morelia	44	(11)
2020–2021	Querétaro	29	(11)
2021–2025	Monterrey	70	(0)
- * Club domestic league appearances and goals

Lizette Montserrat Rodríguez Cisneros (born 10 July 1986) is a Mexican former professional footballer who last played as a Left back for Liga MX Femenil side Monterrey.

== Career ==
In 2016, she started her career in Morelia. In 2020, she was transferred to Querétaro. In 2021, she joined to Monterrey.
