= Taylor Porter =

American soccer player (born 1997)

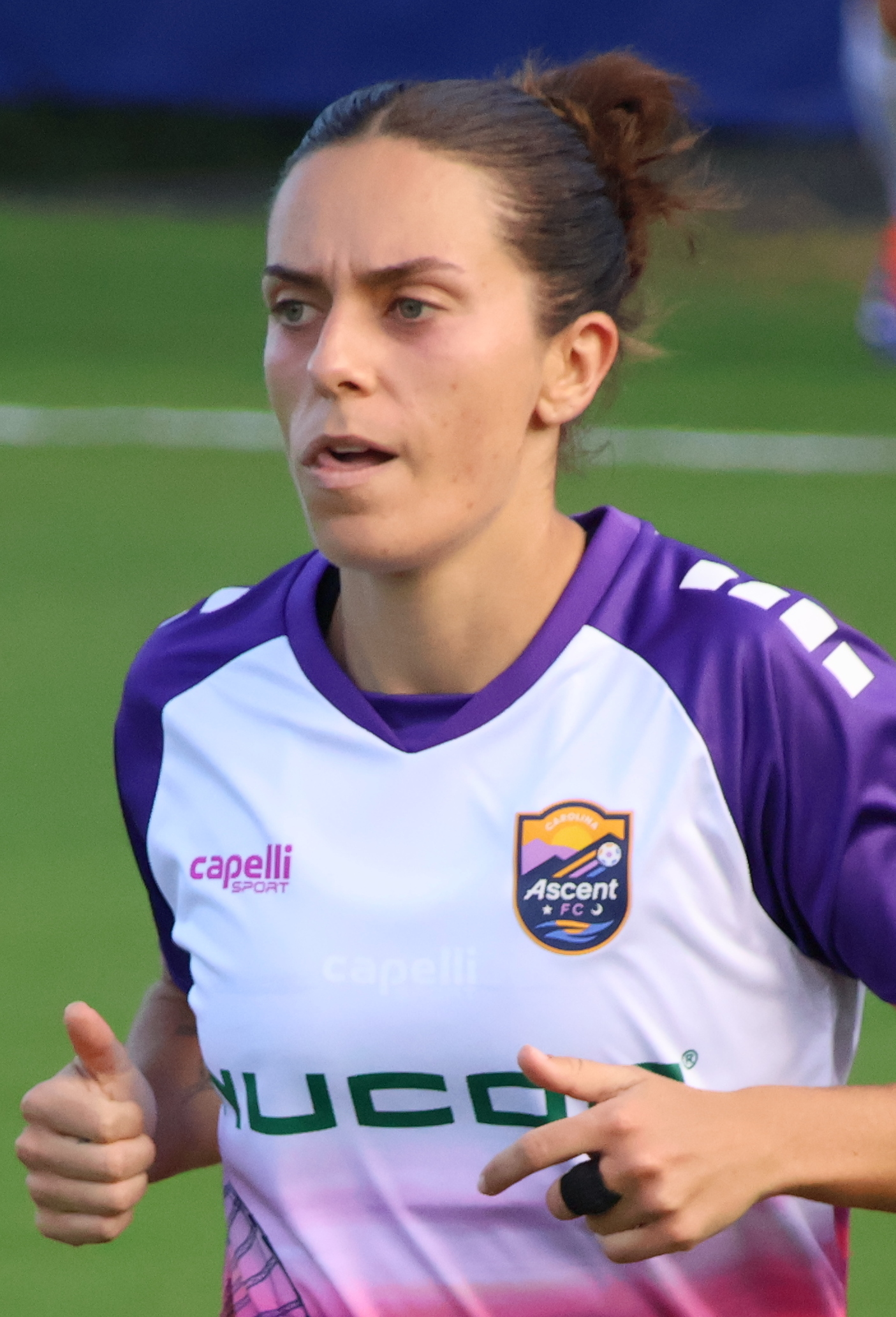
- Porter with the Carolina Ascent in 2025

Personal information
- Full name: Taylor Lauren Porter
- Date of birth: October 29, 1997 (age 29)
- Place of birth: San Diego, California
- Height: 5 ft 8 in (1.73 m)
- Position: Midfielder

Team information
- Current team: Carolina Ascent
- Number: 14

College career
Years	Team	Apps	(Gls)
2015–2018	NC State Wolfpack	85	(6)

Senior career*
Years	Team	Apps	(Gls)
2019	Orlando Pride	0	(0)
2019–2020	ŽFK Spartak Subotica	5	(0)
2020–2021	UDG Tenerife Egatesa	0	(0)
2021–2023	Portland Thorns	19	(3)
2024–	Carolina Ascent	55	(0)
- * Club domestic league appearances and goals as of 17:28, June 4, 2026 (UTC)

Taylor Lauren Porter (born October 29, 1997) is an American professional soccer player who plays as a midfielder for and captains USL Super League club Carolina Ascent. She played college soccer for the NC State Wolfpack.

== Club career ==
Porter signed with the Portland Thorns FC in 2021 when players from the US Women's National team were at the Olympics. She re-signed with the Thorns for the 2022 season.

In May 2024, Porter signed with USL Super League club Carolina Ascent FC. She played every minute of every game in the league's inaugural season and captained the Ascent to the Players' Shield.

== Honors ==
Carolina Ascent

- USL Super League Players' Shield: 2024–25

Portland Thorns

- NWSL Championship: 2022
