= History of sports in the United States =

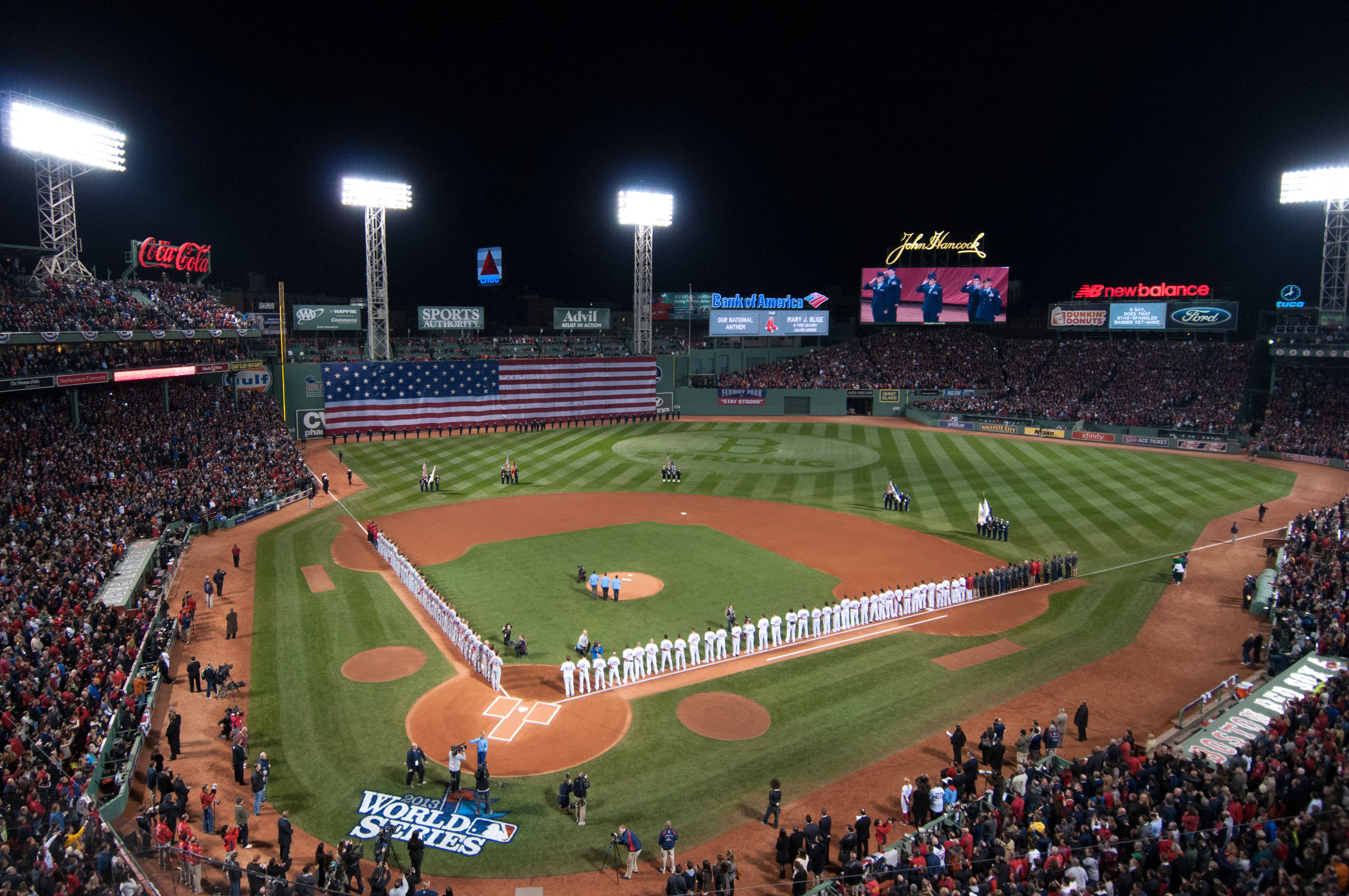
Fenway Park, home of the Boston Red Sox, during the 2013 World Series

The history of sports in the United States reveals that American football, baseball and softball, and indoor soccer evolved from older British sports—rugby football, British baseball and rounders, and association football, respectively. Over time, these sports diverged significantly from their European origins, developing into distinctly American versions. For example, over time, American football developed its own rules and style, becoming distinctly different from its British predecessor and uniquely American. While baseball's origins can be traced to British bat-and-ball games such as British baseball, its development in the United States also incorporated elements from various other bat-and-ball games. Today, baseball enjoys widespread international popularity, especially in East Asia and Latin America.

In contrast, volleyball, skateboarding, snowboarding, and Ultimate Frisbee are American inventions. Volleyball was created by William G. Morgan in 1895 and has since become popular worldwide. Skateboarding, emerging in the 1950s, and snowboarding, which developed in the 1960s and 1970s, are American innovations that have gained global traction. Ultimate Frisbee, developed in the late 1960s, has also spread internationally.

Additionally, sports like lacrosse and surfing have indigenous origins. Lacrosse is rooted in Native American traditions and predates European contact, while surfing has ancient Polynesian origins and became popular in the U.S. in the early 20th century.

== Precolonial era ==
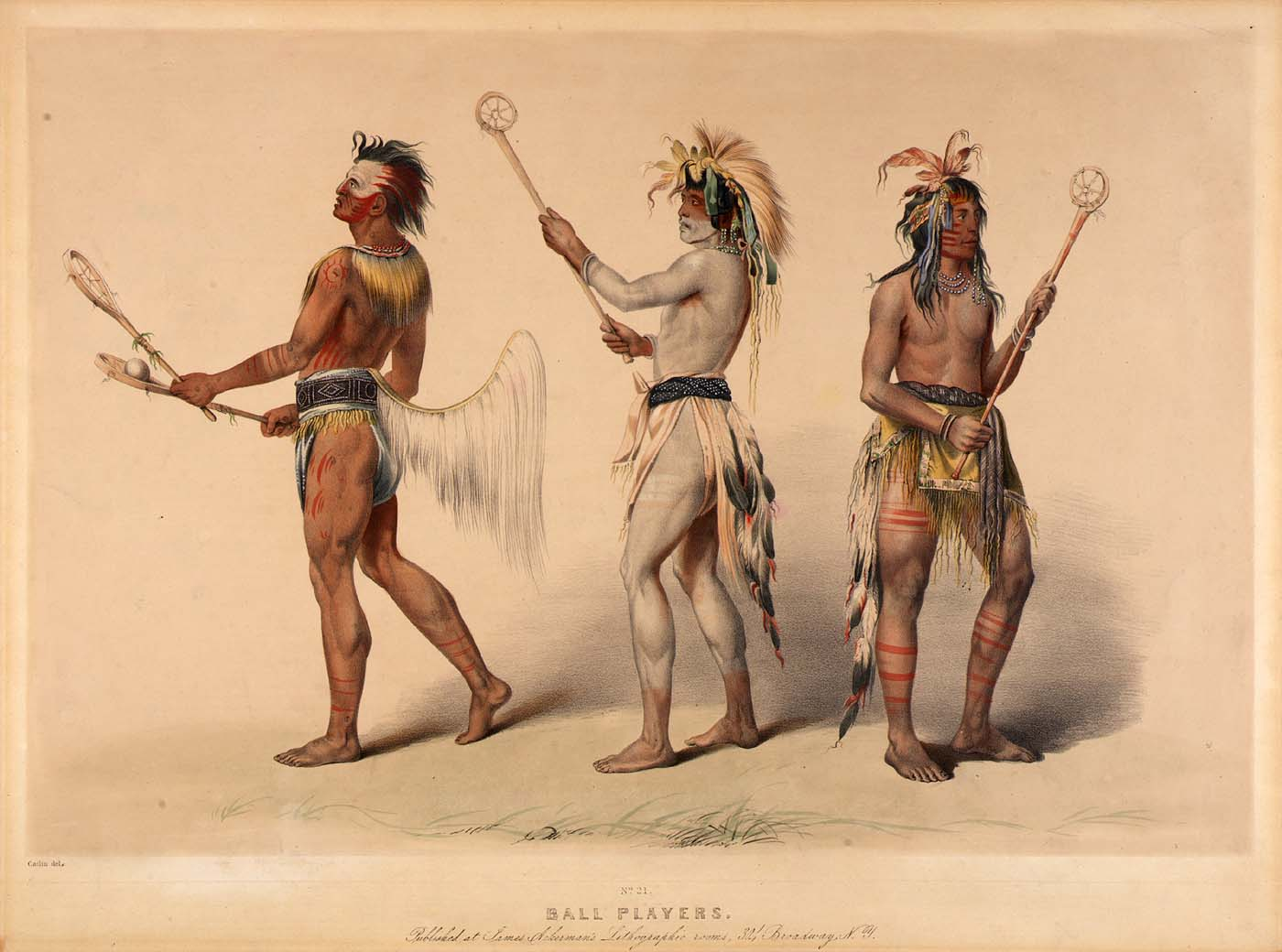
"Ball players", a hand-colored lithograph by George Catlin

The oldest sport invented in what is now known as the USA is lacrosse. Originating among the Indigenous peoples of the Eastern Woodlands and the Great Lakes region, lacrosse was played by various tribes and had spiritual and social significance. The game was often played in large teams and could involve hundreds of players. It was not only a sport but also a way to resolve conflicts, train warriors, and celebrate community. The American Indians had been playing lacrosse for a millennium, since as early as 1100 AD. By the 17th century, a version of lacrosse was well-established and was documented by Jesuit missionary priests in the territory of present-day Canada. Similar to lacrosse, stickball was played in the Southeastern United States. It involved two teams using sticks to hit a ball, and like lacrosse, it was often played for ceremonial reasons or to settle disputes. However, the emergence of lacrosse from stickball in the 1830s led to a shift away from these values.

In ancient Polynesia, especially in ancient Hawaii, Polynesian people have been surfing since at least the start of the 12th century.

Various Indigenous tribes engaged in running games that tested endurance and speed. These races were sometimes part of larger ceremonies or rituals. Recreational activities were sometimes used to peacefully settle conflicts.

== Colonial era ==
British sporting practices were transplanted into the post-Columbian New World, with a distinct American conception of sports and leisure emerging by the mid-18th century. In Chesapeake society (that is, colonial Virginia and Maryland), sports occupied a great deal of attention at every social level, starting at the top.

=== Animal events ===
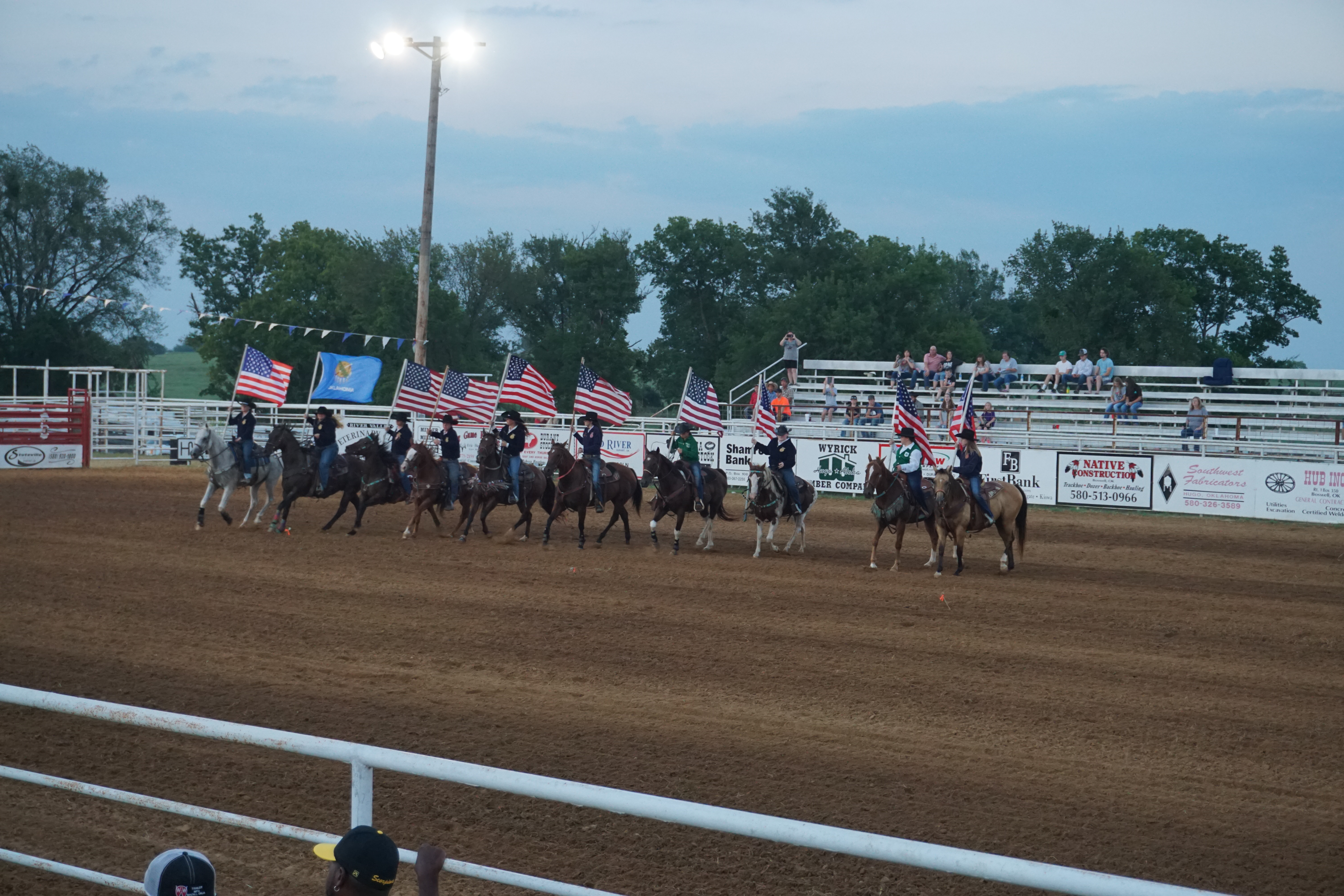
Grand Entry at the Boswell FFA rodeo (2018)

The environmental challenges of frontier life reduced people's interest in play, and pushed them toward more practical activities, such as hunting. In England, hunting was severely restricted to landowners. In USA, game was more than plentiful. Everyone—including servants and enslaved people—could and did hunt, so there was no social distinction to be had. In 1691, Sir Francis Nicholson, the governor of Virginia, organized competitions for the "better sort of Virginians onely who are Batchelors", and he offered prizes "to be shot for, wrastled, played at backswords, & Run for by Horse and foott".

Horse racing was the main event. The typical farmer did not own a horse in the first place, and racing was a matter for gentlemen only, but ordinary farmers were spectators and gamblers. Selected slaves often became skilled horse trainers. Horse racing was especially important for knitting the gentry together. The race was a major public event designed to demonstrate to the world the superior social status of the gentry through expensive breeding, training, boasting and gambling, and especially winning the races themselves. Historian Timothy Breen explains that horseracing and high-stakes gambling were essential to maintaining the status of the gentry. When they publicly bet a large fraction of their wealth on their favorite horse, it told the world that competitiveness, individualism, and materialism were the core elements of gentry values.

=== Cricket ===
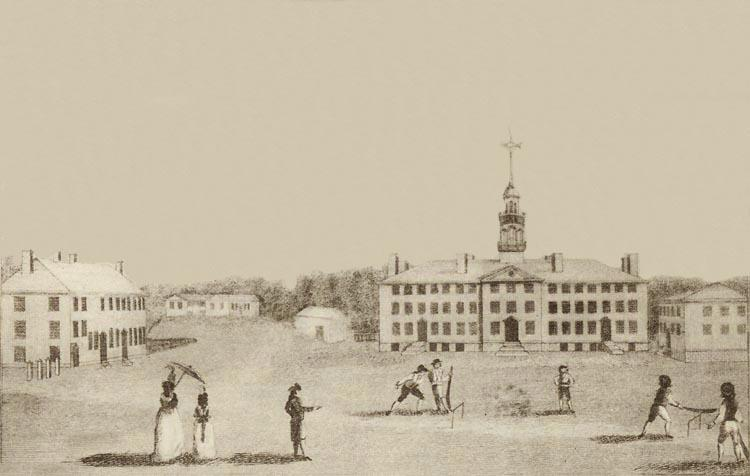
A 1793 depiction (after independence) of "wicket" being played at Dartmouth College. Cricket and its variants were overtaken by baseball in the late 19th century.

Cricket was imported from England to the United States, and was the most popular bat-and-ball sport in the colonial era. However, by the 1850s, both cricket and baseball were considered the "national pastimes" according to John Thorn, official historian of the MLB. Cricket then faded away after the Civil War. This decline occurred for a number of reasons; cricket was considered too long to play, with matches lasting a few days, and particularly after the War of 1812, it was resisted on nativist grounds as being of British origin, with baseball being considered more American.

=== Religion and sport ===
Christianity somewhat limited early sporting events in Colonial America as a result of dissenting reformers like the Puritans who did not hold the same views as the Anglican Church. Where the Anglican Church held positive views towards sporting events, Calvinist principles shifted the positions the reforming Protestant's held on sports. This led to more restrictive approaches to sport where the only tolerated events needed to be done "for sober, practical purposes" such as military maneuvers. It took until the late nineteenth century for this "religious prohibitionism" to flip in the opposite direction. It was then that Protestants began to see sport as having more "spiritual and moral value" which was embodied through organizations such as the Young Men's Christian Association, also known as the YMCA.

== Late 18th century ==
During the American Revolution, games helped pass the time between battles. Some philosophers of the time, inspired by ancient Greek and Roman thought as well as more modern European thought, called for greater unity of body and mind.

The popularity of sport was discouraged by some as impractical in the context of a newly expanding nation, with the first Continental Congress passing a resolution in 1774 that aimed to "discountenance and discourage every Species of Extravagance and Dissipation, especially all Horse Racing, and all Kinds of gaming, Cock Fighting, Exhibitions of Shows, Plays and other expensive Diversions and entertainments". However, athletic and military achievements formed part of the allure of George Washington's career as he became the first to ascend to the Presidency, and in the South, sports offered a way for class and social disparities to be contested. Women became more involved in leisure sports, and sports were also played in colleges and other venues, though they were banned in some places.

== Early 19th century ==
As time passed, Americans became more interested in distinguishing the new nation's culture and sports from British traditions. Women became more involved in spectating men's sports, as it was believed that their presence would moderate rowdy tendencies.

=== Horse racing ===
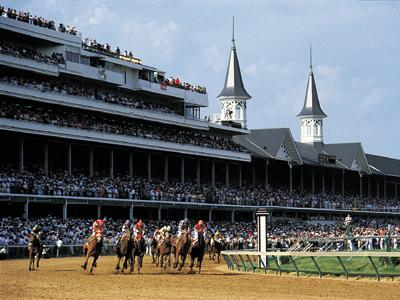
The Kentucky Derby forms part of the triple crown since 1875.

Horse racing was a prominent sport in the early 19th century, deeply rooted in American culture. Horse racing remained the leading sport in the 1780–1860 era, especially in the South. It involved owners, trainers and spectators from all social classes and both races. However, religious evangelists were troubled by the gambling dimension, and democratic elements complained that it was too aristocratic, since only the rich could own very expensive competitive horses.

The 1860s Civil War devastated the wealth needed to support the sport in the South. Thoroughbred racing revived in the North in the 1870s. Elite jockey clubs operated the most prestigious racetracks. They soon faced competition from profit-oriented proprietary racetracks especially in resort towns such as Saratoga Springs, New York. Gambling was legal at the track, but an even larger amount was wagered off-track by unlicensed bookies, often backed by criminal syndicates. The Kentucky Derby, inaugurated in 1875, became a major event. The Kentucky Derby is known as "The Run for the Roses". Ten Broeck was a famous racehorse in the 19th century, known for his victories and records set in various races.

=== Slave plantations ===
On the large slave plantations, the popular male sports were wrestling, boxing, racing, hunting, and fishing. The most popular recreations for women were dancing and singing. David Wiggins says the masters typically tolerated the slaves' pastimes as long as they were ready to work when called upon. The slave children improvised their games. Girls, for example, favored "ring dances", accompanied by songs and riddles.

== Mid-19th century ==
The mid-19th century was a formative period for many sports in the United States, marked by the establishment of formal rules, organizations, and competitions. The development of sports in American society and colleges continued to be influenced by British practices in the Victorian era. Many children's pastimes were transformed into professional sports.

There was a reduction of traditional activities such as hunting, as the rise of urban factory jobs and the increasing ease of participating in and forming private organizations gave rise to a more modern American sporting experience. Urbanization and its takeover of natural playing spaces forced reformers to push for parks. They also pushed for sport to take on a more significant role in American life, arguing that it could help unify a diversifying population.

Rowing competitions were popular, particularly among colleges. The first collegiate rowing competition took place between Yale and Harvard in 1852.

=== Baseball ===
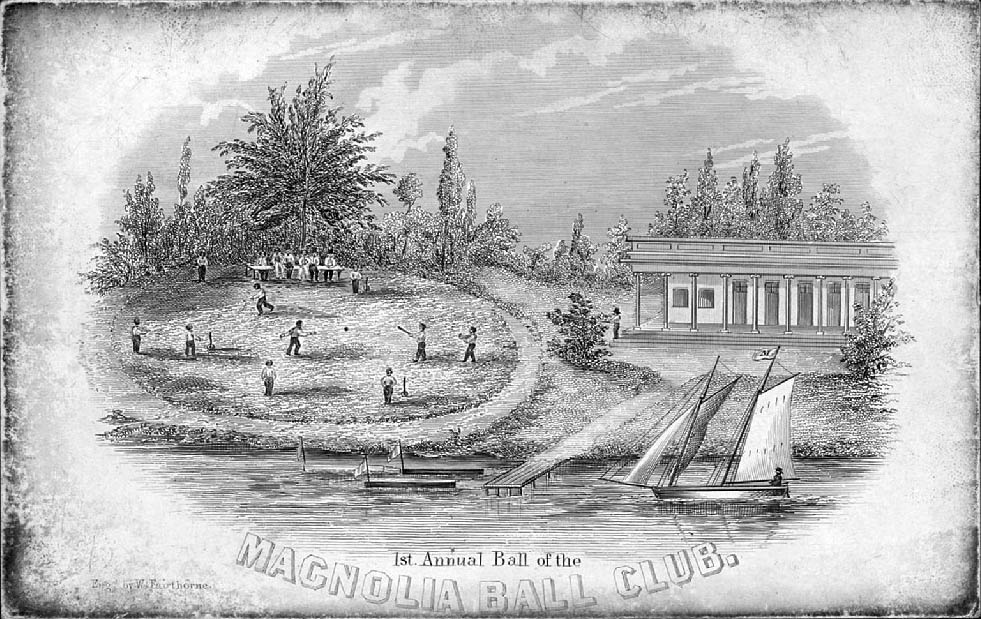
Invitation to the "1st Annual Ball of the Magnolia Ball Club" of New York, c. 1843, depicting the Colonnade Hotel at the Elysian Fields and a group of men playing baseball: the earliest known image of grown men playing the game.

The earliest forms of baseball came from England, and were often played without a bat. The sport then evolved in New York City in the early part of the 19th century, with the Knickerbocker Base Ball Club setting many of the game's modern rules in 1845, and the first organized league, the National Association of Base Ball Players, emerging in 1857. The Civil War helped the sport grow substantially, with veterans spreading the New York variant of the game across the nation. It would eventually be the first team sport in the United States to be professionalized with the 1869 founding of the original Cincinnati Red Stockings (from whom the modern-day Cincinnati Reds took their name). By the late 19th century, baseball had become professionalized, with the National League established in 1876 as the first major professional league.

Abner Doubleday is often mythologized as the "inventor" of baseball, though the evidence for this claim is dubious. Alexander Cartwright was a key figure in formalizing baseball rules and helping to establish the first baseball club, the Knickerbocker Base Ball Club. Harry Wright, a prominent baseball player and manager, was instrumental in the development of baseball as a professional sport. He managed the Cincinnati Red Stockings and helped popularize the game. Cap Anson is one of the first stars of professional baseball and a key figure in its early history. The establishment of the National League (NL) in 1876 represented the formalization of professional baseball. The NL is the oldest extant major professional sports league in the United States and set many of the precedents for modern baseball. Albert Spalding was a prominent pitcher and a key figure in the establishment of the NL.

== Late 19th century ==
The late 19th century saw increasing debates about the commercialization and integrity of sports. Sports preferences varied by region, with baseball popular in the Northeast and football in the Midwest. An increase in the skill level (i.e. exclusivity) and rowdiness of professional baseball factored into Americans becoming more interested in other sports. Women's involvement in sports, such as tennis and golf, began to increase toward the end of the century. By the late 19th century, American sports had developed formal rules, professional leagues, and a significant national and international presence, laying the groundwork for modern sports.

Though Francis Ouimet’s most famous achievements were in the early 20th century, his impact started in the late 19th century. He is celebrated for his victory in the 1913 U.S. Open, which is often seen as a turning point for American golf. Cy Young was one of the greatest pitchers in baseball history. His career spanned the 19th and early 20th centuries, and he was known for his remarkable consistency and longevity.

=== American football ===
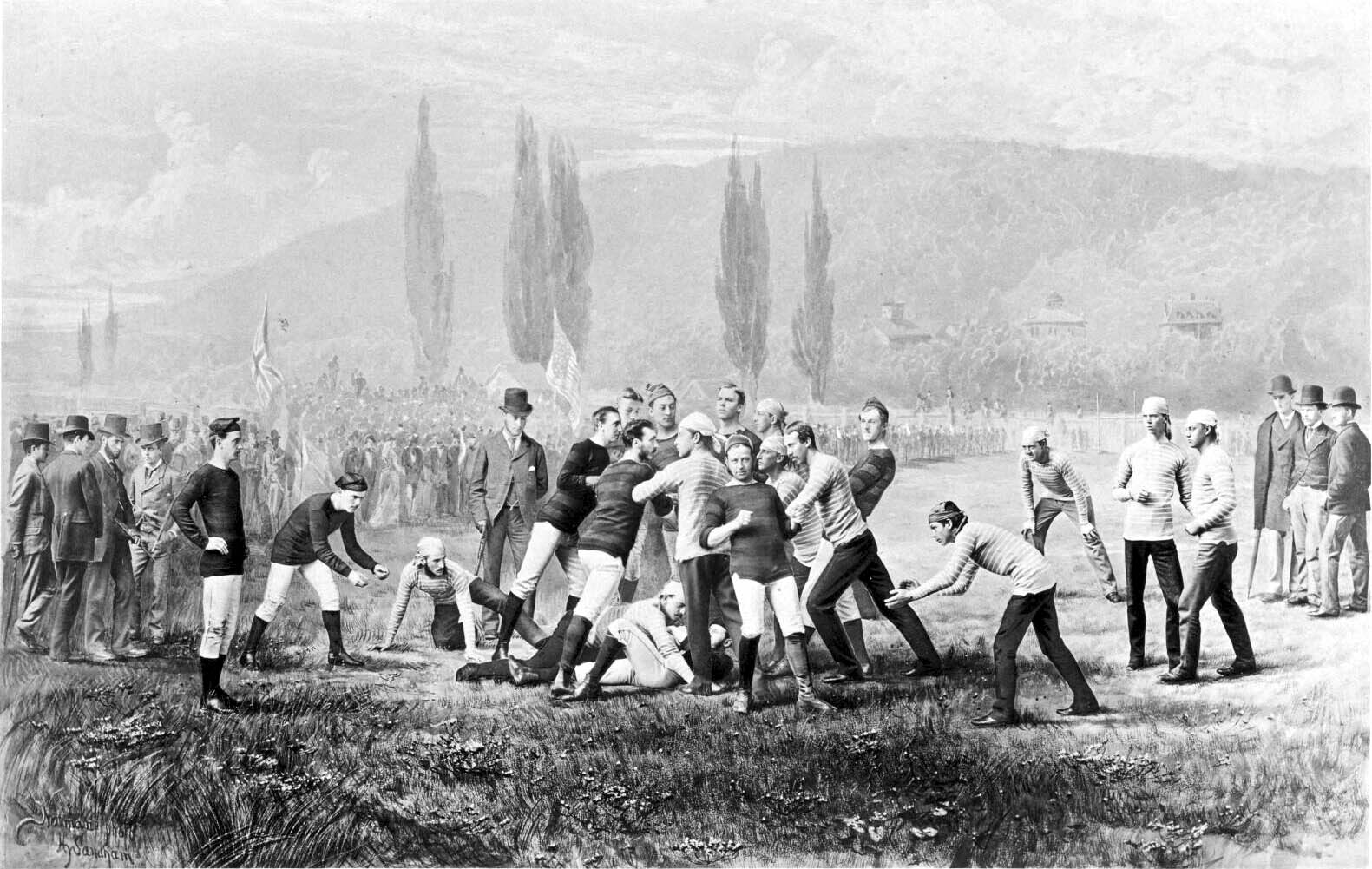
One of the two Harvard vs. McGill games played in 1874.

American football began with the first intercollegiate game between Princeton and Rutgers in 1869. The sport saw major changes, including the introduction of the forward pass and the establishment of the NCAA, leading to its growing popularity, especially in colleges. Walter Camp, known as the "Father of American Football", began influencing the game in the late 19th century by establishing many of the rules and structures that define modern football.

=== Boxing ===
Initially marked by unregulated, bare-knuckle matches, boxing gained structure with the Marquess of Queensberry Rules in 1867, introducing gloves and rounds. This formalization helped the sport gain wider acceptance and organization. Tom Molineaux was an early 19th-century African-American boxer who gained prominence in both American and British boxing. John L. Sullivan known as "The Boston Strong Boy", Sullivan was the first heavyweight champion of the gloved era and a major sports figure in the late 19th century.

=== Basketball ===
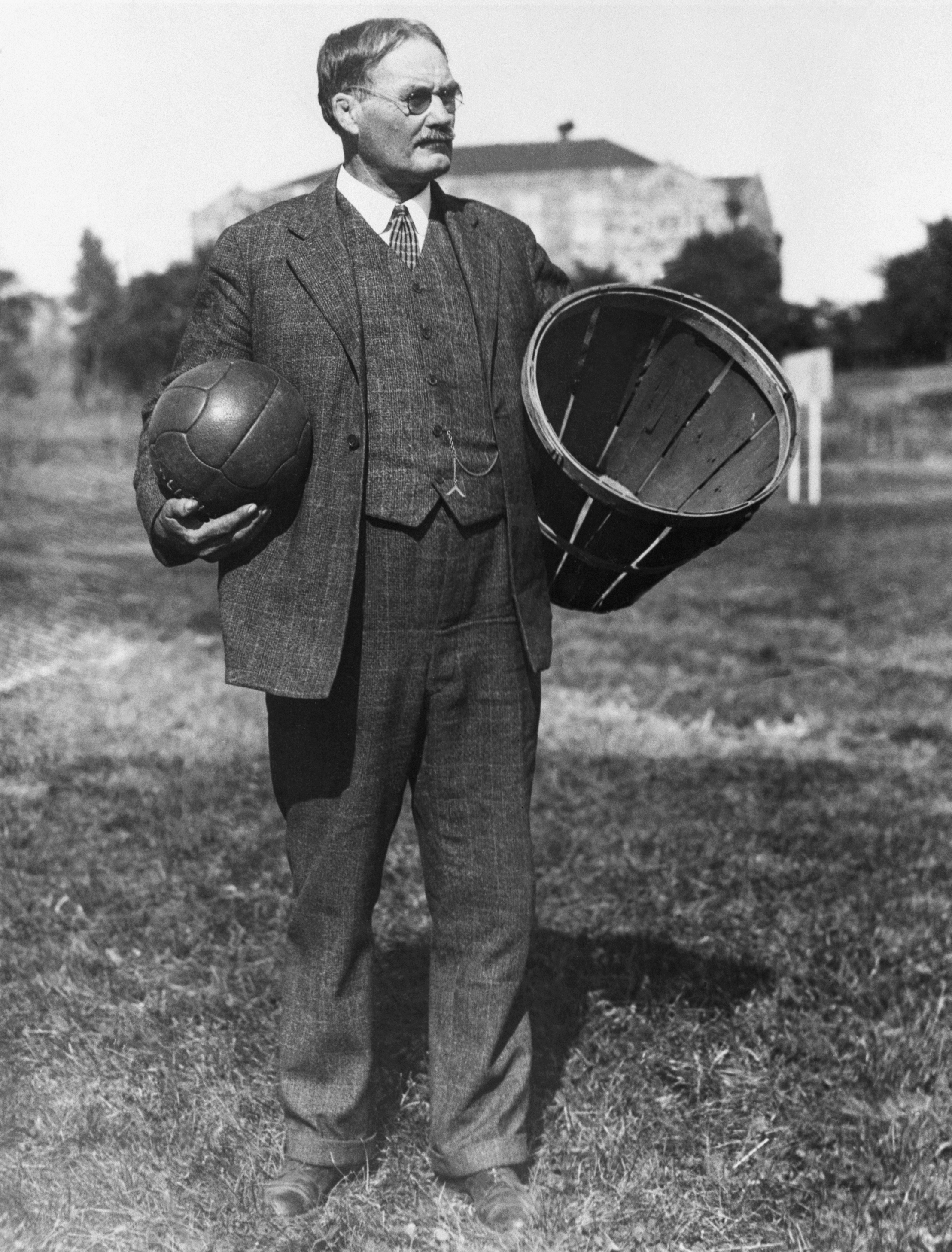
James Naismith with the basket that was used in the earliest versions of the game

Basketball, invented by Dr. James Naismith in 1891 as a winter indoor activity, quickly gained traction and began spreading to colleges and beyond. By the century's end, it had established itself in various colleges and set the stage for future professional leagues.

=== Lacrosse ===
Lacrosse began to be organized in the U.S. in the late 19th century. It gained broader attention through college competitions and became popular in certain regions.

=== Tennis ===
Lawn tennis began to gain popularity in the United States during the late 19th century. The first U.S. National Championships, which later became the U.S. Open, were held in 1881. Richard Sears dominated American tennis in the late 19th century, winning the first seven U.S. National Championships (now the U.S. Open) from 1881 to 1887, making him one of the most successful early American tennis players. Helen Wills Moody, though her career flourished primarily in the 1920s and 1930s, began her rise in the late 19th century. She won 31 Grand Slam titles, including 8 Wimbledon and 7 U.S. Open singles titles, making her one of the most dominant players in tennis history.

== Early 20th century ==
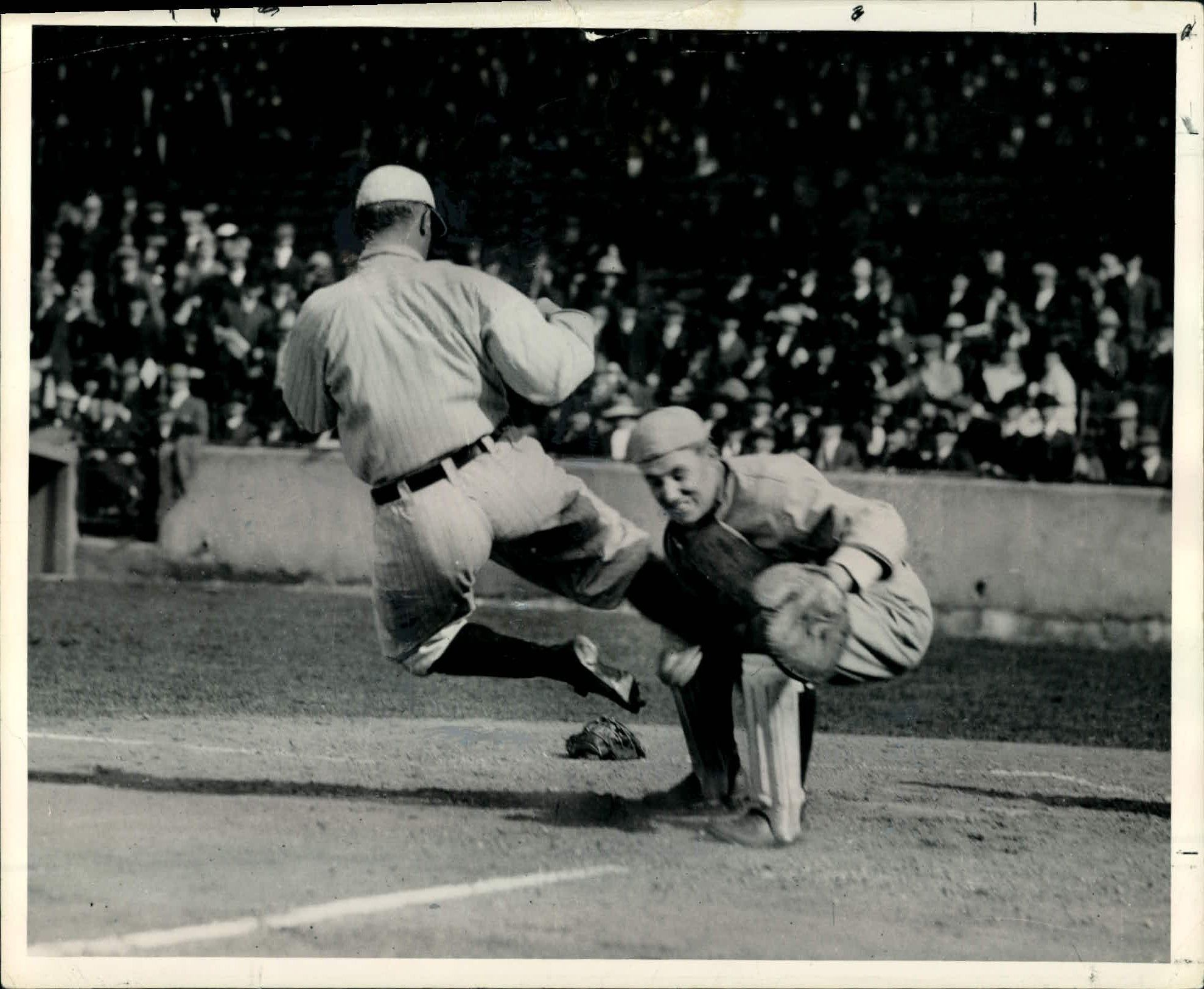
Ty Cobb violently crashing into St. Louis Browns catcher Paul Krichell in 1912 to make him drop the ball.

By 1920, most Americans saw sport as a way to unify the nation's various groups and Americanize immigrants. President Theodore Roosevelt played a role in the growth of sports in this period, pushing for Americans to embrace a strenuous life. The rise of radio and television further expanded sports' reach and influence.

Baseball continued as America's pastime, with the American League forming in 1901 and stars like Babe Ruth and Ty Cobb boosting its popularity and attendance substantially. The NFL was established in 1920, and the sport grew rapidly, refining its rules and gaining widespread college and professional followings. The early 20th century saw boxing's golden age with stars like Jack Johnson and Joe Louis. It became a major sport with significant media attention. Golf and tennis grew in prominence, with major tournaments becoming key events. Lastly the NHL, was founded in 1917, growing in popularity, extending its reach beyond northern states.

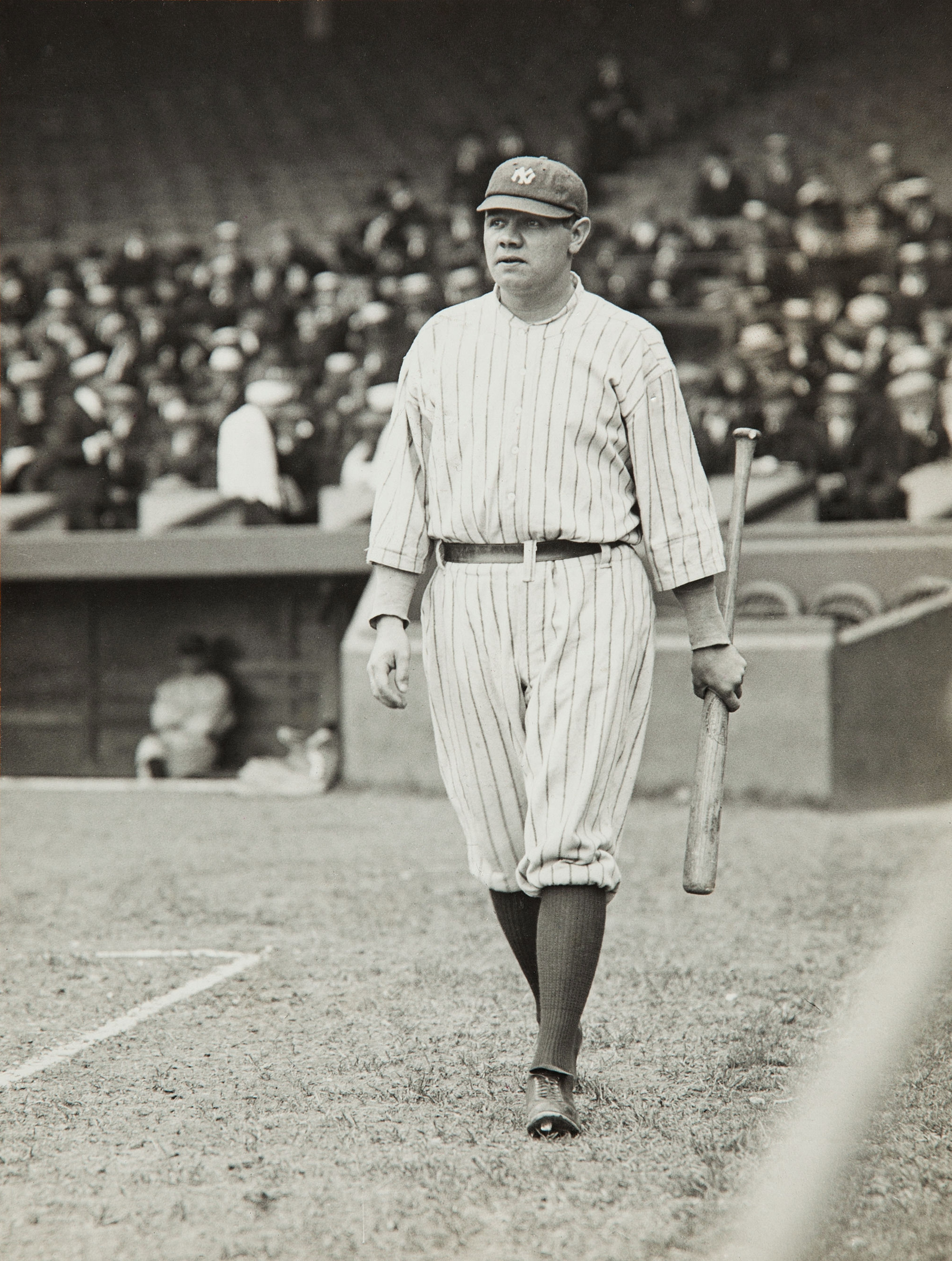
Babe Ruth Known as "The Sultan of Swat", in 1920 during his first year with the New York Yankees

Moral opposition led by evangelical Protestants and social reformers led nearly all states to close their horse tracks by 1910. Much of the spectator attention shifted to automobile racing, where technology was central rather than gambling. Some tracks had both automobile and horse racing. One example was the Pennsboro Speedway, which opened for horse racing in 1887, and added automobile racing in 1926. It was the original home of the Hillbilly 100 from 1967 to 1998; the track became obsolete and closed in 2002. Horse racing made its comeback in the 1920s, as state governments legalized on-track betting which provided a welcome new flow of state revenues from a voluntary activity without imposing compulsory taxes on all citizens. By the 1950s, more people attended horse races than any other sport.

=== Racial integration ===
At the sixty or so historically black colleges, such as Howard University in Washington and Fisk University in Nashville, students and alumni developed a strong interest in athletics during the 1920s and 1930s. Sports were expanding rapidly at state universities, but very few black stars were recruited there. Race newspapers hailed athletic success as a demonstration of racial progress. Black schools hired coaches, recruited and featured stellar athletes, and set up their own leagues. Before 1887, the presence of black players in organized baseball was exceedingly rare. Instead, they predominantly competed in Negro league baseball, which varied in stability and caliber.

In contrast, professional American football saw more integration from its inception, encompassing diverse ethnicities including blacks, Hispanics, Native Americans (such as Olympic superstar Jim Thorpe and others from institutions like the Carlisle Indian School), and Asians. Jim Thorpe, one of the greatest athletes of the early 20th century, was of Sac and Fox descent. He excelled in football, baseball, and track and field, and won two Olympic gold medals. He had a successful career in the early National Football League (NFL) and in professional baseball

=== Regulation of women's sports ===
In the early 20th century, elite male and female athletes were being coached by men. Women coaches at the collegiate level developed an alternative to the highly competitive masculine model of sport in the 1920s. They created "play days" for women during which participation, cooperation, and social interaction were more the focus than victory and defeat. The motto was: ‘Play With Us, Not Against Us.’ This mode of sport also represented an effort by female administrators to obtain more control over women's athletic activity with a feminist perspective.

== Mid-20th century ==
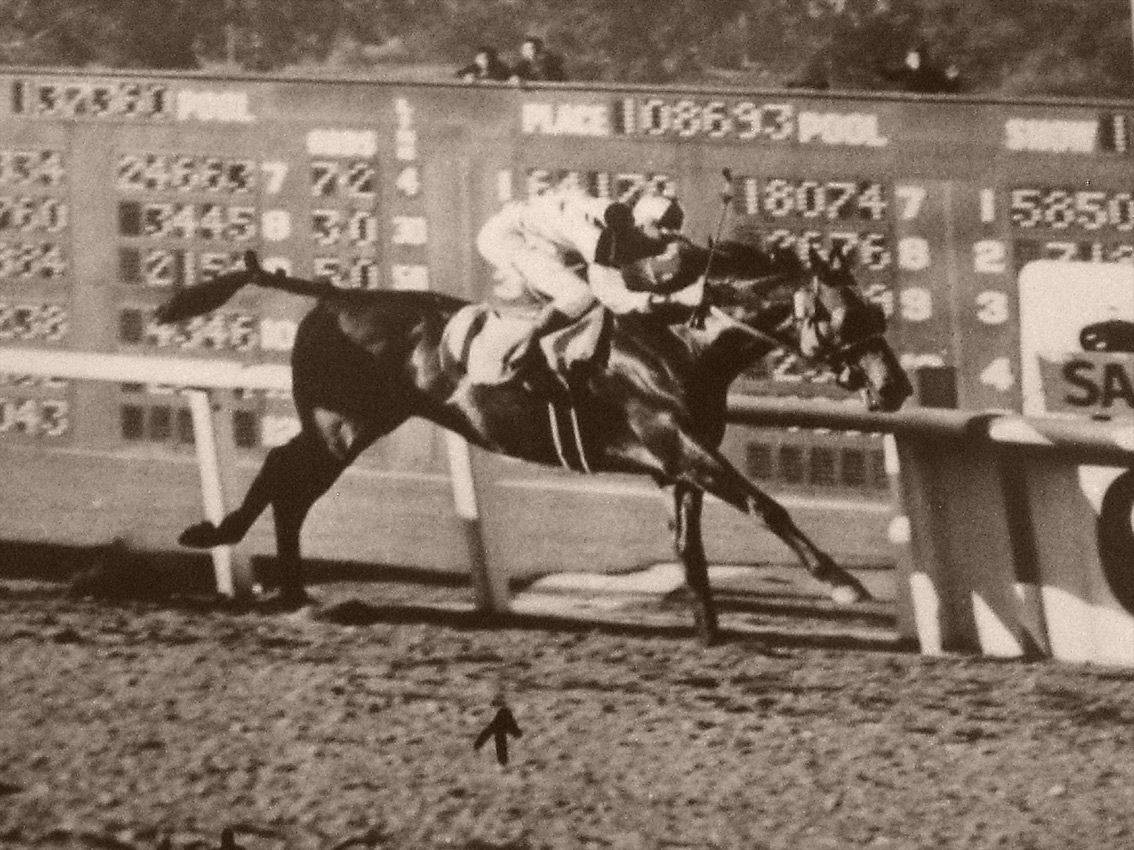
Seabiscuit winning the Santa Anita Handicap in 1940. Seabiscuit was a legendary American racehorse whose story became a symbol of hope and perseverance during the Great Depression.

The rise of television as a major influence, significantly spring modern sports culture. Baseball continued as a major sport, with new stars elevating the game’s prominence. The NFL grew significantly, highlighted by the introduction of the Super Bowl in 1967. Iconic players like Johnny Unitas became central to the sport's development. Basketball gained prominence with the founding of the NBA in 1946. The sport expanded through colleges and professional leagues. The NBA expanded with stars such as Bill Russell. The NCAA Tournament gained major popularity, establishing college basketball as a significant event. Boxing remained a prominent sport with Muhammad Ali, whose career brought widespread attention and cultural impact. Golf and tennis saw increased visibility with stars like Arnold Palmer, Jack Nicklaus, and Billie Jean King.

=== 1930s ===
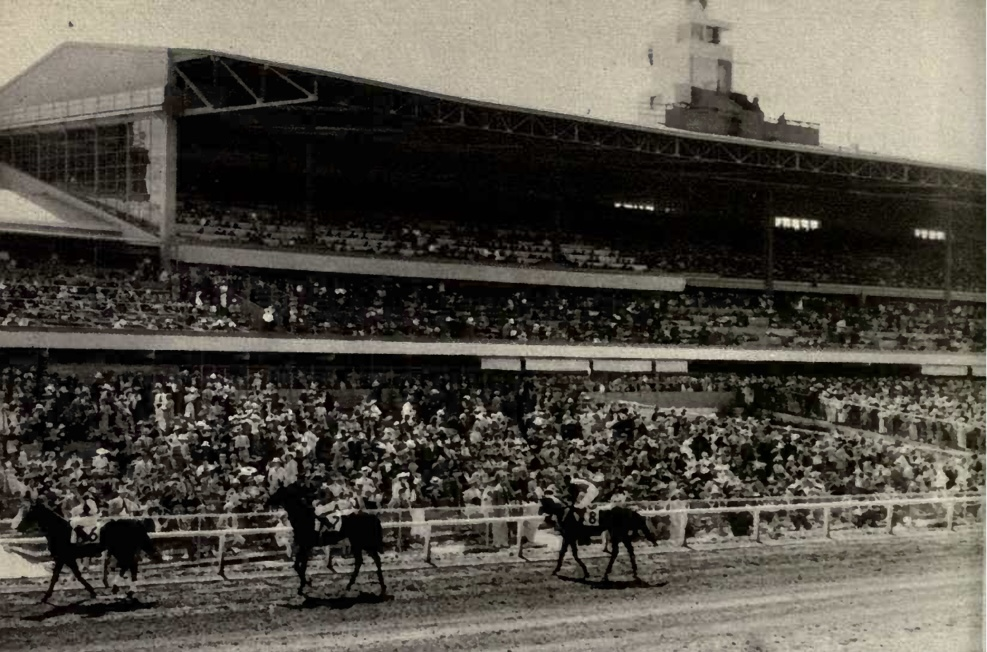
Hollywood Park Racetrack, often just called Hollywood Park, was a notable thoroughbred racetrack located in Inglewood, California. It opened in 1938 and gained prominence for hosting high-profile horse races, including the Hollywood Gold Cup, which was one of the most prestigious races on the West Coast.

During the New Deal of 1933–1939, public sports facilities were upgraded and expanded with large sums of relief money. The CWA, WPA, and CCC were large nationwide relief projects that typically favored collaboration with local government, which often provided the plans and the site, as well as the materials and the heavy equipment, while the federal government provided the labor. Building new recreational facilities in public parks fit the model, and tens of thousands of recreation and sports facilities were built in both rural and urban areas. These projects had the main goal of providing jobs for the unemployed, but they also played to a widespread demand at the time for bodily fitness and the need for recreation in a healthy society. Roosevelt was a strong supporter of the recreation and sports dimension of his programs. The WPA spent $941 million on recreational facilities. including 5,900 athletic fields and playgrounds, 770 swimming pools, 1,700 parks, and 8,300 recreational buildings. WPA spent an additional $229 million on sports and recreational staff workers.

=== Manliness ===
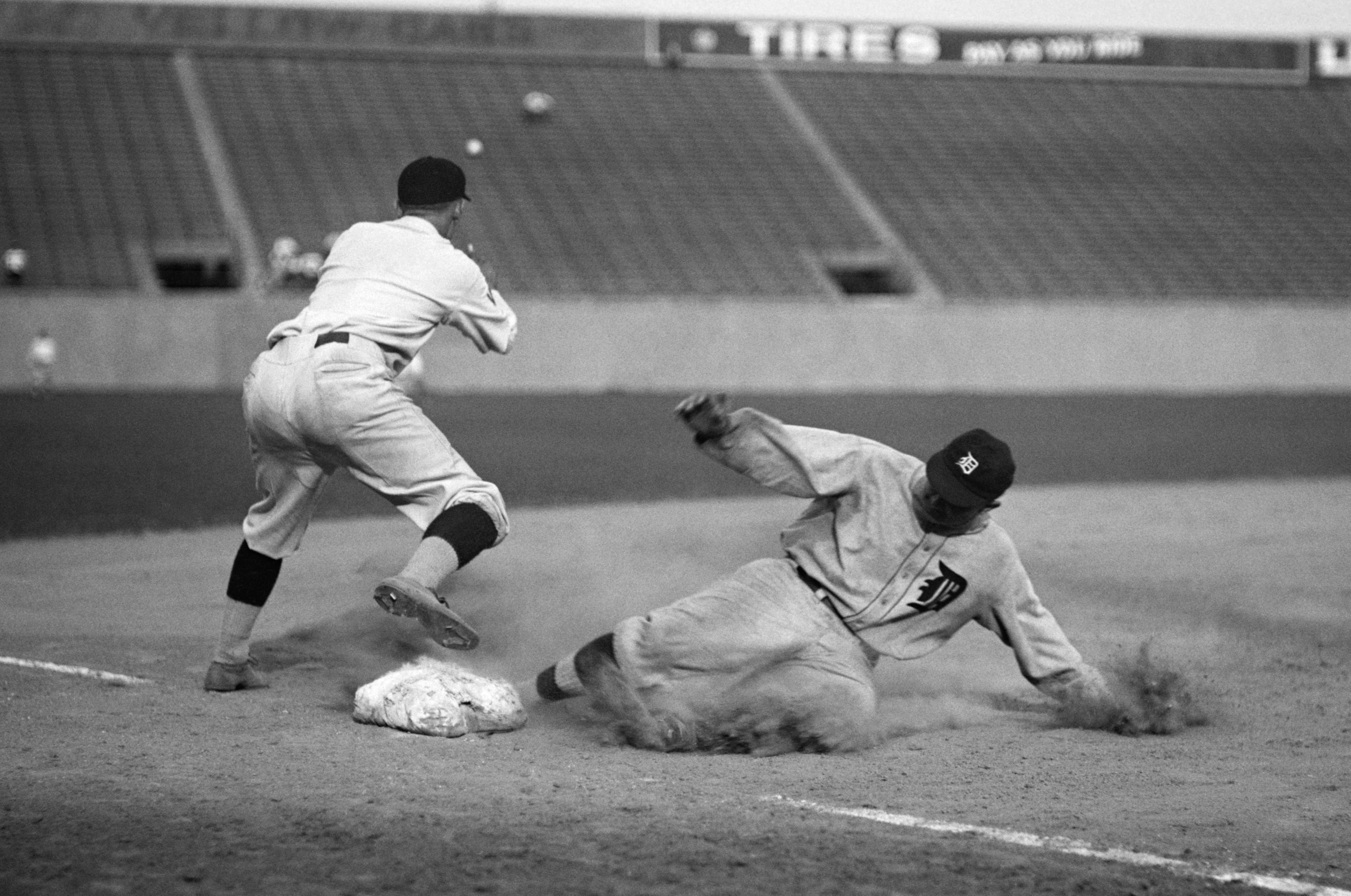
Ty Cobb sliding into third base

Organized sports played a major role in defining new models of manliness by the mid-19th century. Boxing was professionalized, and emphasized the physical and confrontational aspects of masculinity. Bare-knuckle fighting without gloves represented "the manly art" in 19th century America.

Historian Steven Elliott Tripp has explored the reaction of fans to Ty Cobb, the most dominant American baseball star of the early 20th century. He was "a player fans loved to hate", so much so that he became the pioneer sports celebrity. It was the male fans who responded enthusiastically to how Cobb demonstrated in action a new level of modern masculinity. Cobb did that by his performance as a specialist in his art, a man with iron nerve, undaunted, fighting to advance his team and his career by crushing his weaker, less-masculine opponents. Cobb demonstrated raw emotion and encouraged his audience to participate in the masculine posturing underway in the stadium by shouting their taunts and jeers at the opposing team.

In the late 19th century, the return of veterans from the Civil War encouraged appreciation for masculinity. By the mid-20th century, industrialization and other factors, such as the closing of the frontier and corresponding urbanization, were seen as making men weak and "overcivilized". As a result, physical training was further emphasized in American military training of the time.

=== Desegregation and inclusion ===
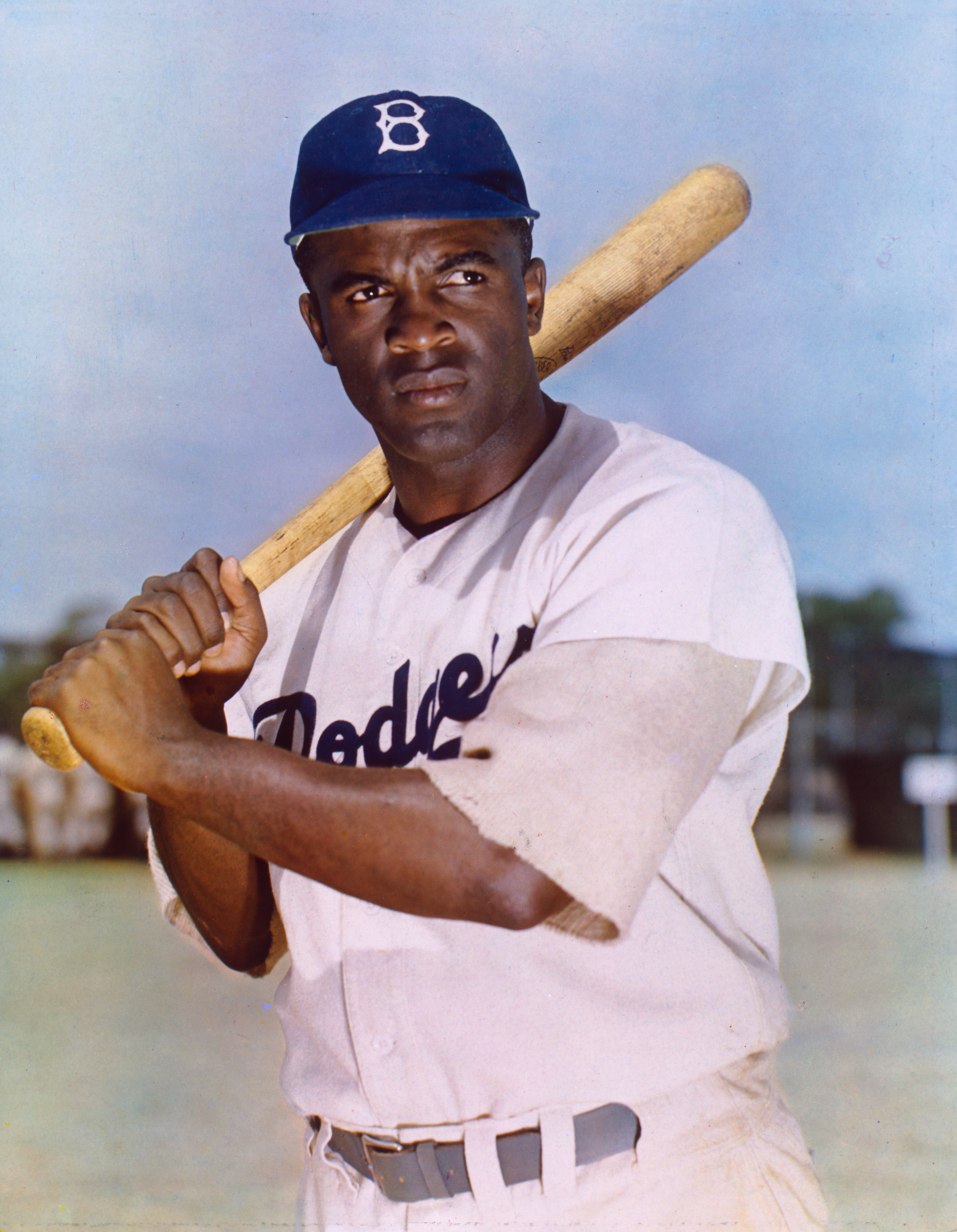
Jackie Robinson, famous for being the first black MLB player

The period saw increased integration and diversity in sports, with figures like Jackie Robinson and Wat Misaka breaking racial barriers. George Preston Marshall imposed a strict color barrier on the National Football League (NFL) from 1933 to 1946. Marshall, owner of the Washington Redskins, infamously upheld this segregationist policy until 1962, refusing to sign black players to his team despite broader integration in the sport. The NFL integration in the late 1940s came as professional football was brought to California, where college and professional teams remained fully integrated; when the NFL placed its first team (the Los Angeles Rams) in the state in 1946, it was obligated to integrate, and did so by signing college superstar Joe Aguirre and Kenny Washington.

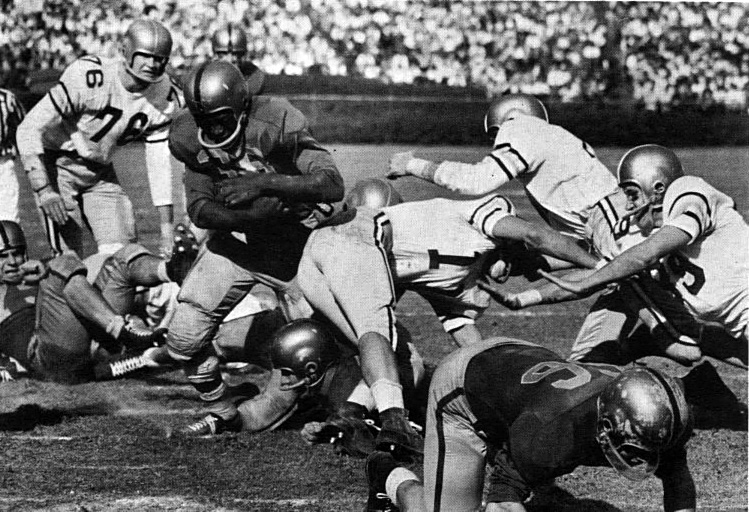
In 1956, Pitt's Bobby Grier (pictured carrying the ball) was the first to break the Sugar Bowl's color-barrier

One of the most notable events involved the 1956 Sugar Bowl. Segregationists tried to keep Pitt fullback/linebacker Bobby Grier from playing because he was black. Georgia's governor publicly threatened the Georgia Tech's president Blake R. Van Leer to cancel the game. Ultimately, Bobby Grier played making this the first integrated Sugar Bowl and is regarded as the first integrated bowl game in the Deep South.

As for Jewish participation in sports, Sandy Koufax, an exceptional baseball pitcher who played for the Los Angeles Dodgers, was known for his dominance on the mound and was a three-time Cy Young Award winner. He is also noted for his decision to not pitch during Yom Kippur, reflecting his strong Jewish faith. Hank Greenberg, a powerful first baseman for the Detroit Tigers, was a two-time MVP and a key figure in Major League Baseball during the 1930s and 1940s.

==== Women's professional leagues ====
Toni Stone was a professional female baseball player who played in predominantly male leagues. In 1953, she became the first woman to play as a regular on an American major-level professional baseball team.

== Late 20th century ==
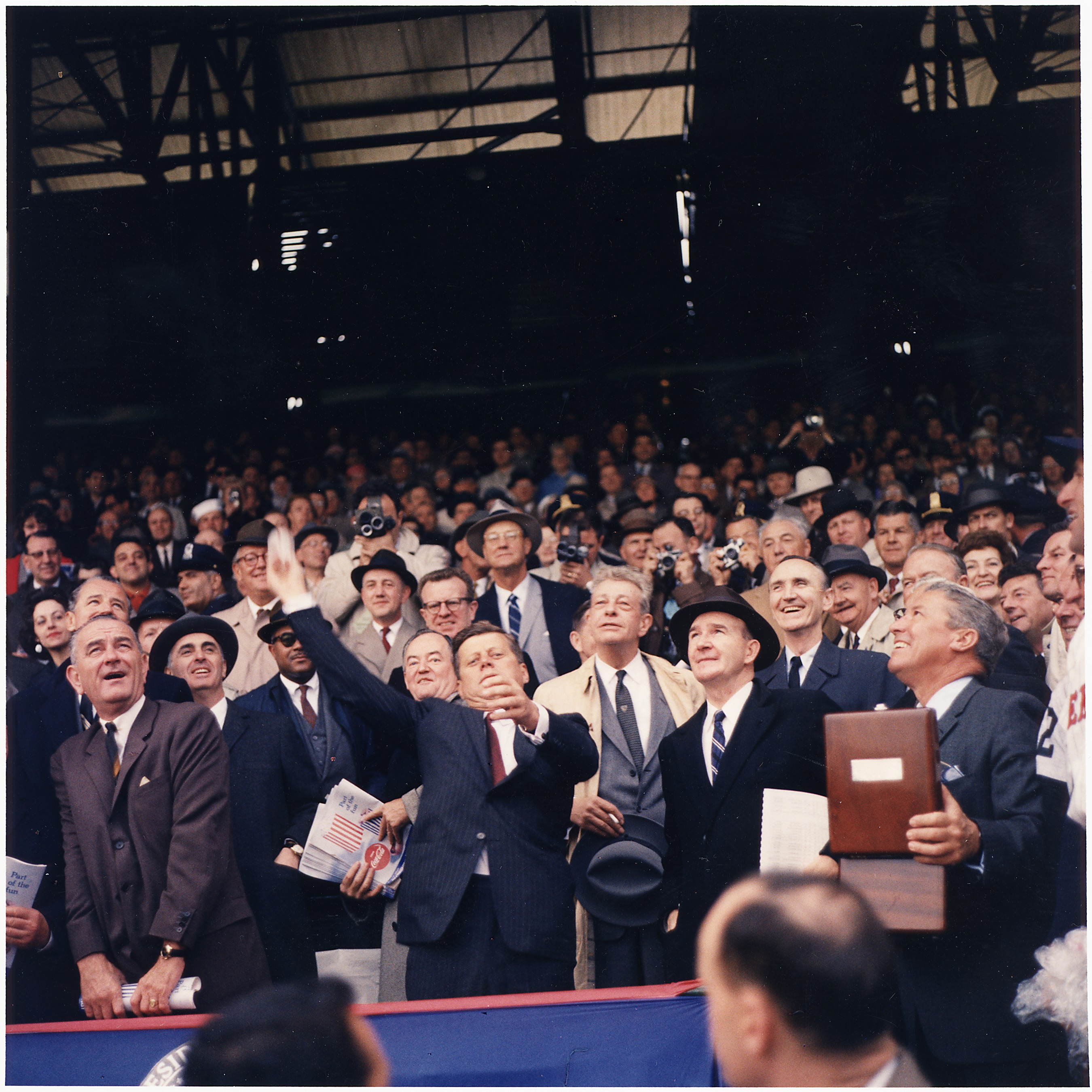
1961 President John F. Kennedy throws out the first ball in opening day.

The late 20th century saw advancements in media technology, including cable television and sports networks, which significantly increased the visibility and commercial reach of sports. The era saw greater diversity in sports, with increased participation and recognition of athletes from various backgrounds. Gender equality efforts also gained momentum, with increased opportunities for female athletes.

=== Growth of professional sports ===
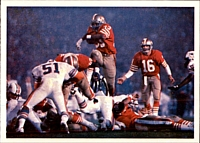
The Super Bowl became a major cultural event, with high-profile halftime shows and significant media attention

The late 20th century saw labor disputes, including the 1994-95 MLB strike, which temporarily disrupted the sport but eventually led to new labor agreements and increased revenue. The sport continued to thrive with iconic players like Cal Ripken Jr., known for his consecutive games streak. The NFL solidified its position as America's most popular sport with stars like Jerry Rice. The league's expansion and the introduction of new teams contributed to its growing popularity. The NBA experienced tremendous growth with the rise of stars like Michael Jordan, Magic Johnson, and Larry Bird. Jordan's Chicago Bulls dominated the 1990s, leading to increased global interest in the sport. The 1992 "Dream Team", featuring NBA stars, won the Barcelona Olympics and helped popularize basketball internationally.

The NHL continued to expand, adding new teams and growing its fan base in the U.S. The Stanley Cup Finals gained increased viewership, and the league saw growth in Southern and Western U.S. markets. The iconic "Miracle on Ice" at the 1980 Winter Olympics also boosted the sport's popularity. Tennis remained popular with stars like Andre Agassi and Chris Evert. The sport saw increased media coverage and commercial success. Golf saw a resurgence in popularity with the rise of Tiger Woods, who became a dominant force in the sport and brought increased attention and viewership. Soccer grew to a significant extent because of Latino immigration, with Major League Soccer being launched in 1996 with ten teams. (Note: Los Angeles Galaxy, Colorado Rapids, DC United, Columbus Crew, New England Revolution, Kansas City Wizards, now Sporting Kansas City, Dallas Burn, now FC Dallas, NY/NJ MetroStars, now New York Red Bulls and Tampa Bay Mutiny.)

In horse racing, Secretariat won the Triple Crown and set records in the Kentucky Derby, Preakness Stakes, and Belmont Stakes, (1973) capturing widespread attention. However, since the late 20th century, horse racing has struggled against competition from other sports and casinos.

=== Minorities seek a role ===
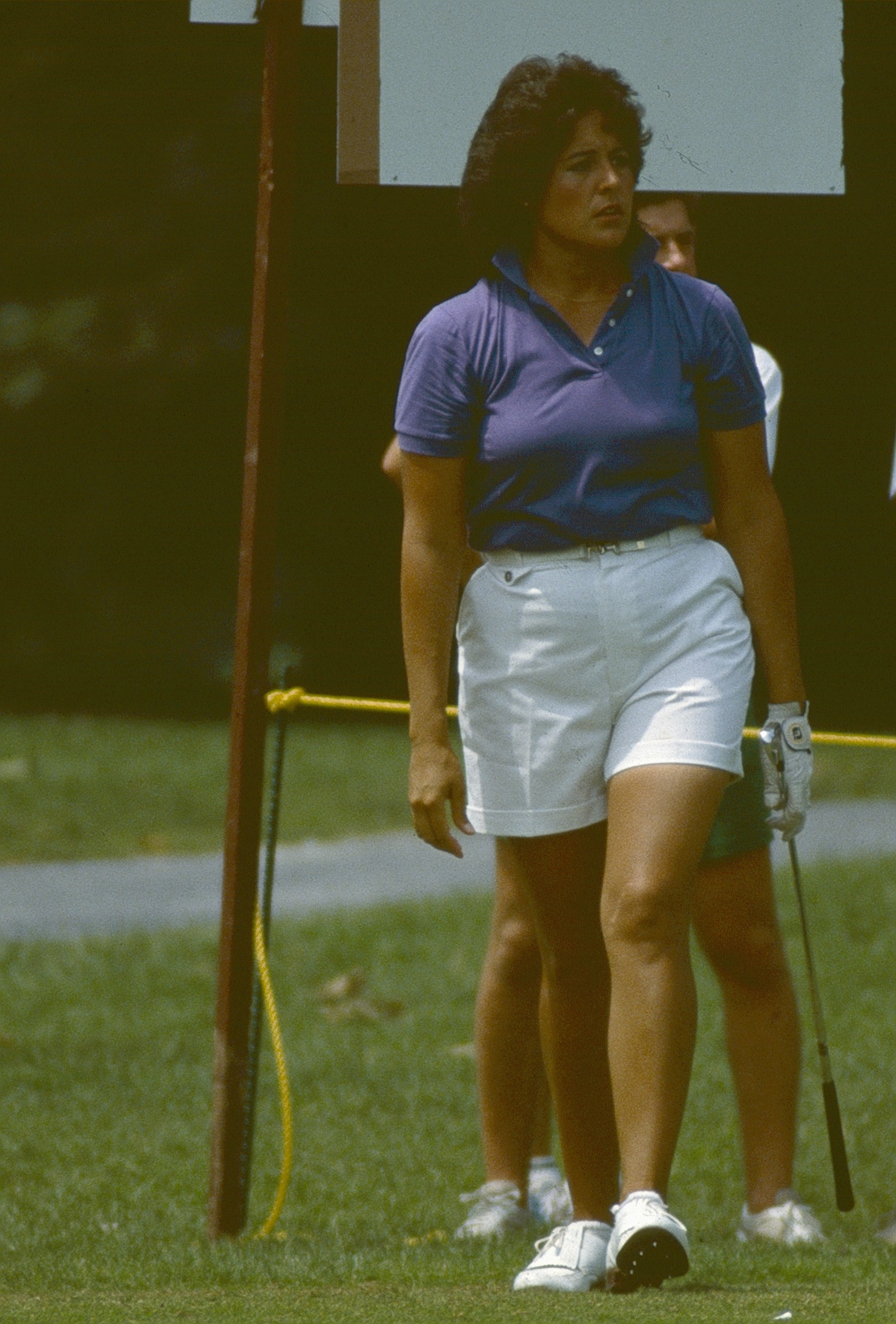
Nancy Lopez is currently the youngest golfer ever to be inducted into the LPGA Hall of Fame.

Billy Mills, a Lakota Native American, won the gold medal in the 10,000 meters at the 1964 Tokyo Olympics, making him one of the few Americans to win a gold in that event. Jim Plunkett made history as the first Latino quarterback to win a Super Bowl, and seven years later, Doug Williams became the first black quarterback to achieve this feat. Similarly, Tom Flores broke ground as the first Latino coach to win a Super Bowl before Tony Dungy became the first black coach to do so. Carlos Bocanegra was a soccer player who served as the captain of the United States national team and played professionally in Major League Soccer and Europe.

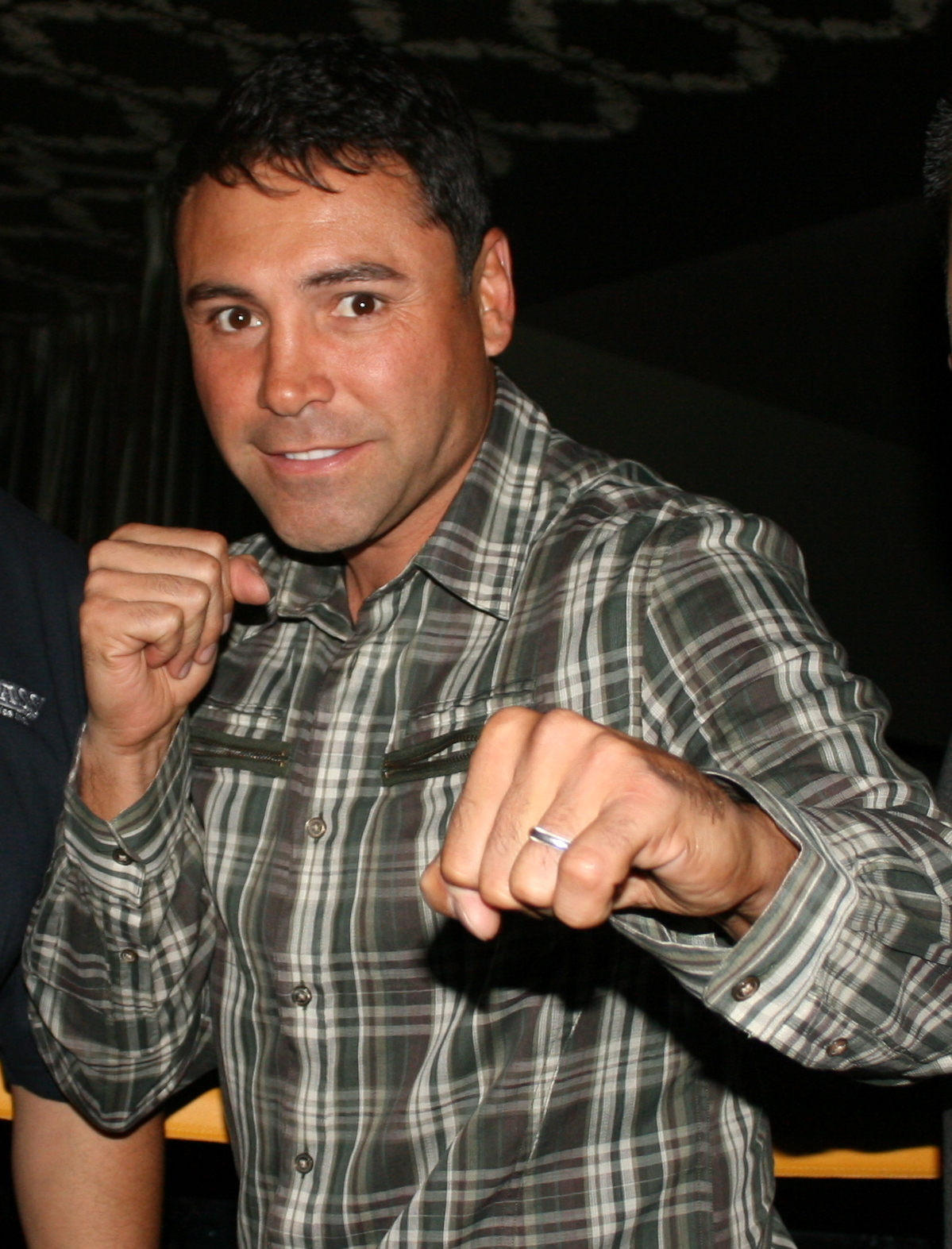
In the realm of boxing, Oscar De La Hoya cemented his legacy by winning multiple world titles across different weight classes

In the 20th century, women in U.S. sports achieved remarkable successes and broke significant barriers. Babe Didrikson Zaharias excelled in both track and field and golf, becoming a pioneering multi-sport athlete. Billie Jean King revolutionized tennis with 39 Grand Slam titles and a landmark victory in the "Battle of the Sexes". Wilma Rudolph became the fastest woman in the world with three gold medals at the 1960 Rome Olympics. Pat Summitt reshaped women's college basketball with the most NCAA Division I wins as a coach. Florence Griffith-Joyner set enduring world records in the 100 and 200 meters at the 1988 Olympics. Althea Gibson broke racial barriers in tennis with 11 Grand Slam titles. Nancy Lieberman made significant contributions to women's basketball both as a player and coach. Shirley Babashoff earned multiple Olympic swimming medals and was vocal about doping issues.

The U.S. Women’s Soccer Team (USWNT) became a dominant force, winning the inaugural Women’s World Cup in 1991 and multiple titles since. These women not only excelled in their sports but also advanced the cause of gender equality in athletics. Mia Hamm is often considered the face of women's soccer and played a crucial role in popularizing the sport in the U.S. Her exceptional skill, leadership, and ability to perform in crucial moments have made her a lasting icon in the sport.

== Early 21st century ==
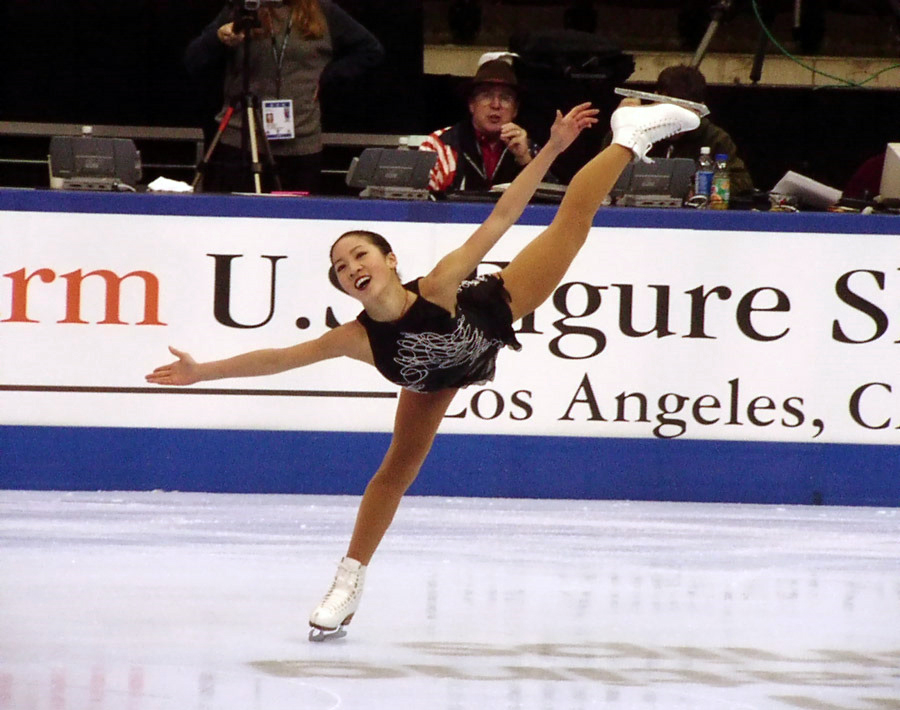
Michelle Kwan performing her signature spiral at a practice session at the 2002 U.S. Figure Skating Championships.

The New England Patriots, led by quarterback Tom Brady and coach Bill Belichick, won multiple Super Bowls (2001, 2003, 2004, 2014, 2016, 2018), establishing one of the most successful dynasties in NFL history. The NFL continued to expand its reach with international games in London and Mexico City, and discussions have occurred about potentially adding more teams or relocating franchises. Increased focus on player safety, including changes to tackle rules and protocols for concussion management, arose from growing awareness of chronic traumatic encephalopathy (CTE) and other long-term health issues.

Golden State Warriors Dynasty: The Warriors, led by Stephen Curry, Kevin Durant, and Klay Thompson, won championships in 2015, 2017, 2018, and 2022, revolutionizing the game with their emphasis on three-point shooting. Chicago Cubs ended their 108-year championship drought by winning the World Series in 2016, a historic event that captivated fans.

=== COVID-19 pandemic ===
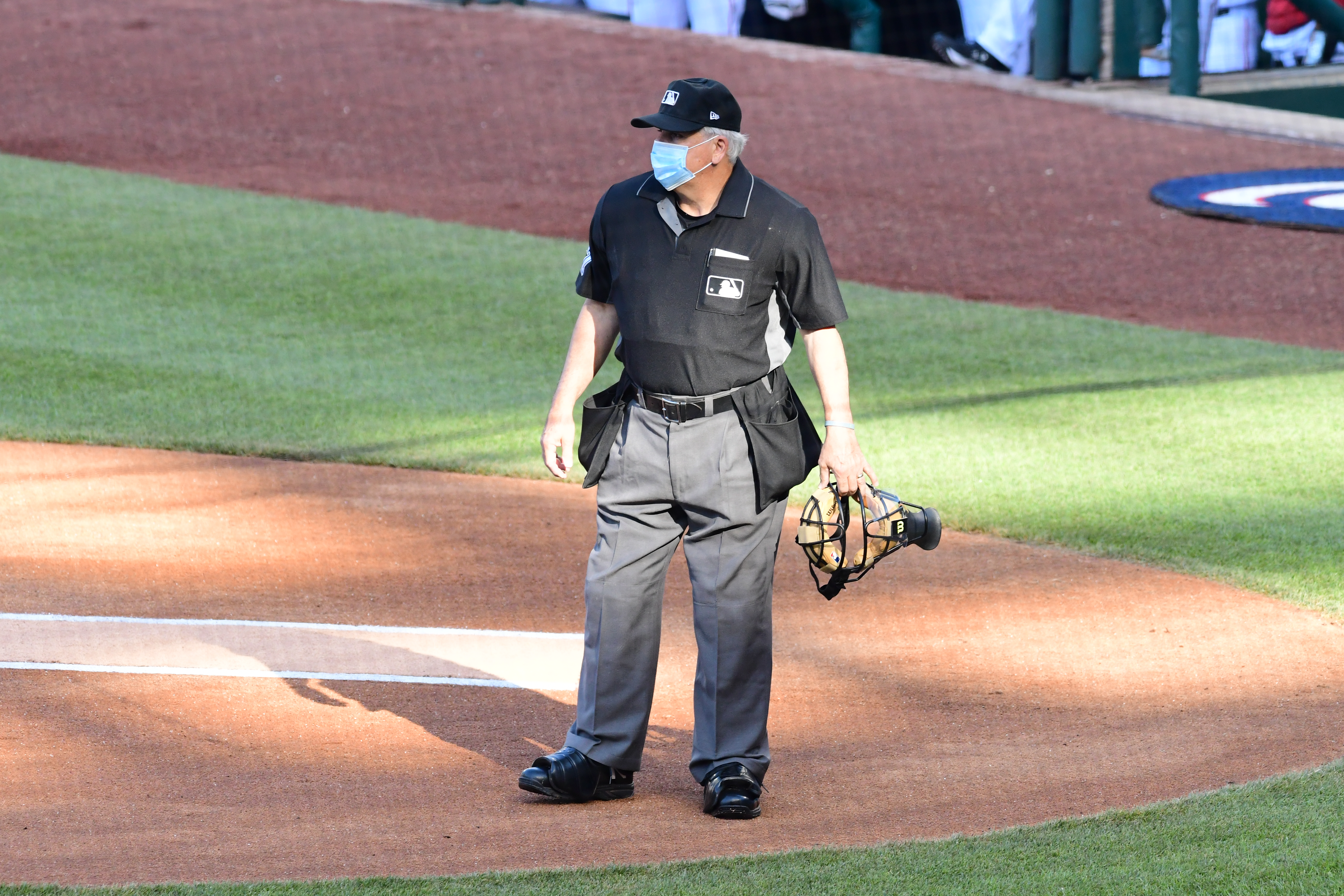
An MLB umpire wearing a face mask

Nearly all sports in the United States were forced to completely halt operations during the COVID-19 pandemic in the United States beginning in March 2020. Individual sports such as golf, mixed martial arts and auto racing were the first to resume operations in May, with baseball, ice hockey and basketball following in July, without fans in attendance.

The breadth and length of the cancellations was unprecedented in American history, as even during the 1918 Spanish flu pandemic, sports continued to be played with fans (only the 1919 Stanley Cup was canceled midway through due to the illness hitting one of the teams; baseball was played as normal as the peak of the flu season hit during the offseason, while football, still in its unorganized regional phase at the professional level, played reduced schedules).

== Modern overview ==
=== Impact of technology ===
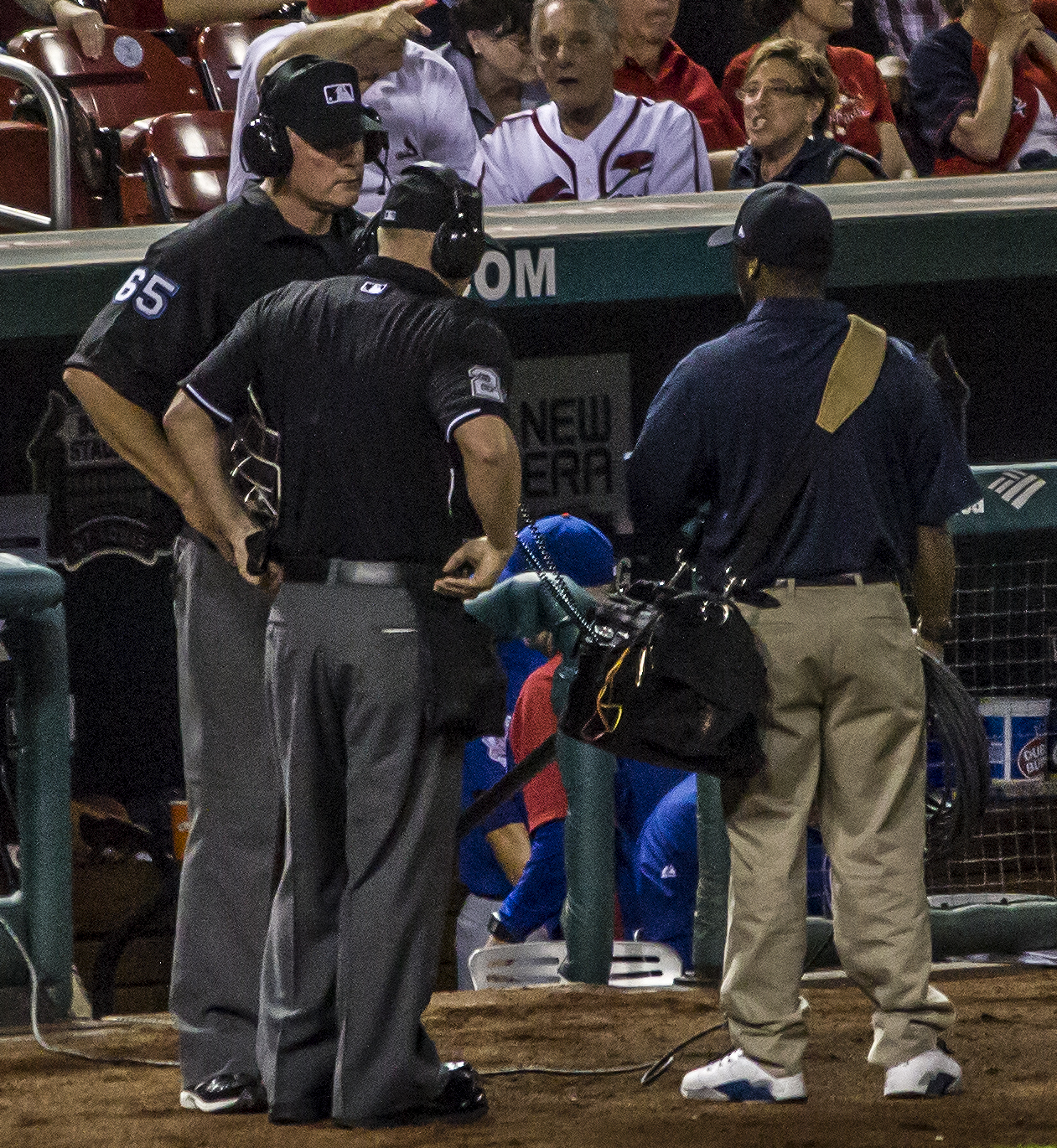
Innovations such as instant replay have enabled more accurate decisions on the field, but sometimes slow down the game

The use of advanced statistics and analytics has transformed team strategies, player evaluations, and game management, popularized by the “Moneyball” approach. Wearables for athletes and television graphics have also enhanced athletic training and spectator engagement respectively.

The rise of esports has transformed competitive gaming into a major industry, with games like League of Legends and Fortnite attracting large audiences and significant financial investments. The rise of platforms like Twitch and major tournaments such as The International (for Dota 2) have solidified esports as a significant part of American sports culture.

=== Popularity of sports ===
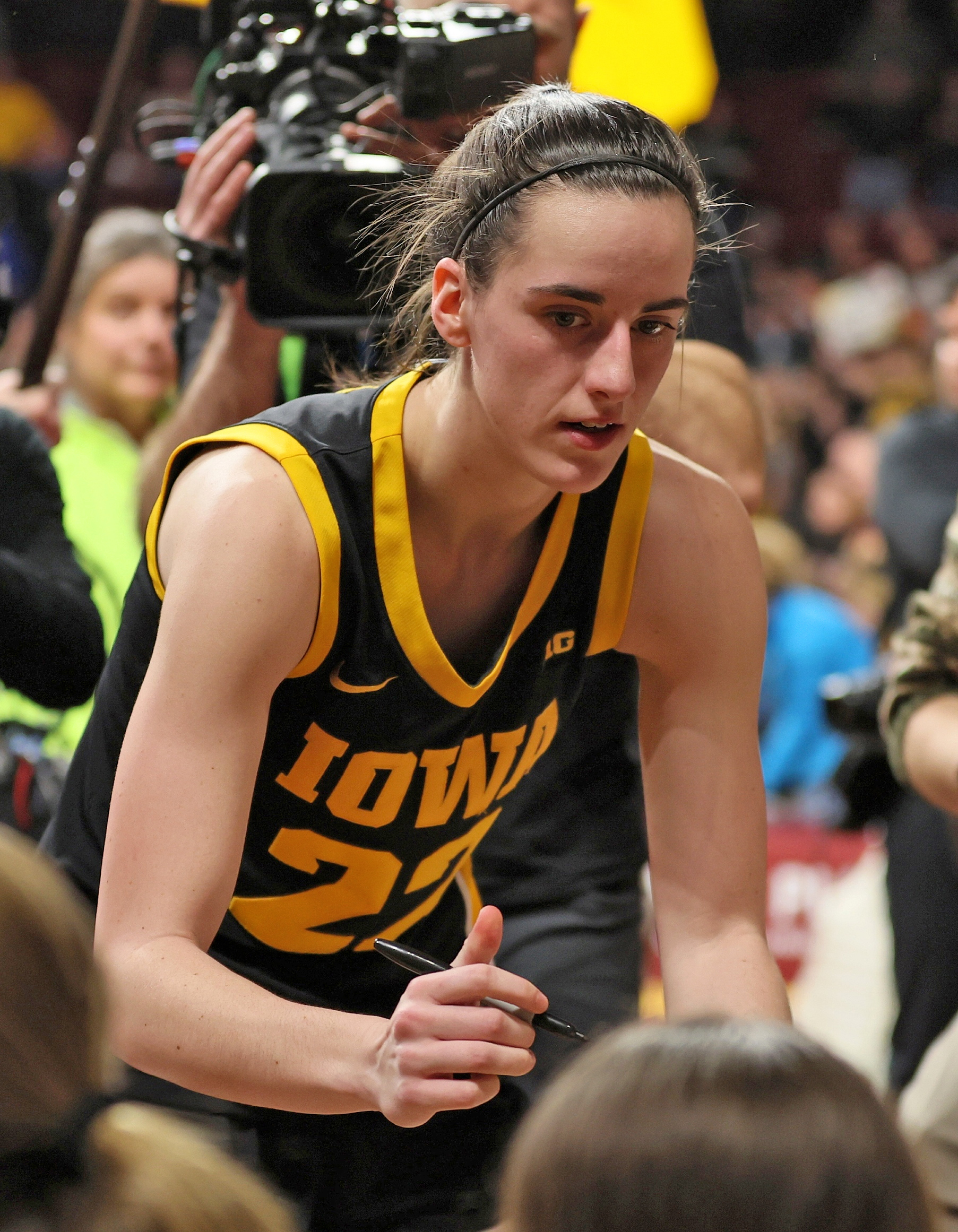
Caitlin Clark, a major factor in the growth of women's basketball, signing autographs after a game in 2024

Baseball has been regarded as the national sport since the late 19th century, with Major League Baseball (MLB) being the top league, while American football is now by several measures the most popular spectator sport, with the National Football League (NFL) having the highest average attendance of any sports league in the world and a Super Bowl watched by millions globally. Basketball and ice hockey are the country's leading professional team sports to be primarily played indoors, with the top leagues being the National Basketball Association (NBA) and the National Hockey League (NHL). These four major sports, when played professionally, each occupy a season at different, but overlapping, times of the year.

In soccer, the country hosted the 1994 FIFA World Cup and co-hosted the 2026 World Cup. The men's national soccer team has qualified to twelve World Cups and the women's team has won the FIFA Women's World Cup four times; Major League Soccer is the sport's highest league in the United States. In the 21st century, soccer in the U.S. has seen significant growth, with Major League Soccer (MLS) and the National Women’s Soccer League (NWSL) becoming prominent fixtures in professional sports. while college soccer continues to serve as a key development platform for emerging talent, Women teams from schools with strong soccer programs, such as UNC, Florida State, and Stanford, have contributed to the sport's popularity. This expansion is marked by increased attendance, media coverage, and a growing fan base across both men’s and women’s soccer.

Boxing and horse racing were once the most watched individual sports, but they have been eclipsed by Mixed Martial Arts (MMA) and auto racing, particularly NASCAR. The Ultimate Fighting Championship (UFC) in 1993 started showcasing various fighting styles in a cage match format, drawing initial interest. The Daytona 500 often referred to as "The Great American Race", it has been a major event in NASCAR since its inception. Richard Petty, Dale Earnhardt, and Jeff Gordon became legends in NASCAR, each contributing to the sport's rise in popularity. NASCAR's fan base has remained strong, with events like the Daytona 500 and the NASCAR Cup Series attracting large audiences. The Premier Lacrosse League PLL, founded in 2019, has attracted attention with its innovative approach to league management and high-level competition.

College football and basketball attract large audiences. While not as popular as football or basketball, college baseball has a dedicated following, particularly during the NCAA Baseball Tournament and the Men's College World Series held in Omaha, Nebraska. The Women's College World Series (WCWS), held in Oklahoma City, also attracts large crowds and significant television viewership. Teams from programs like Oklahoma, UCLA, and Florida often draw large fan bases.

=== Women in professional sports ===
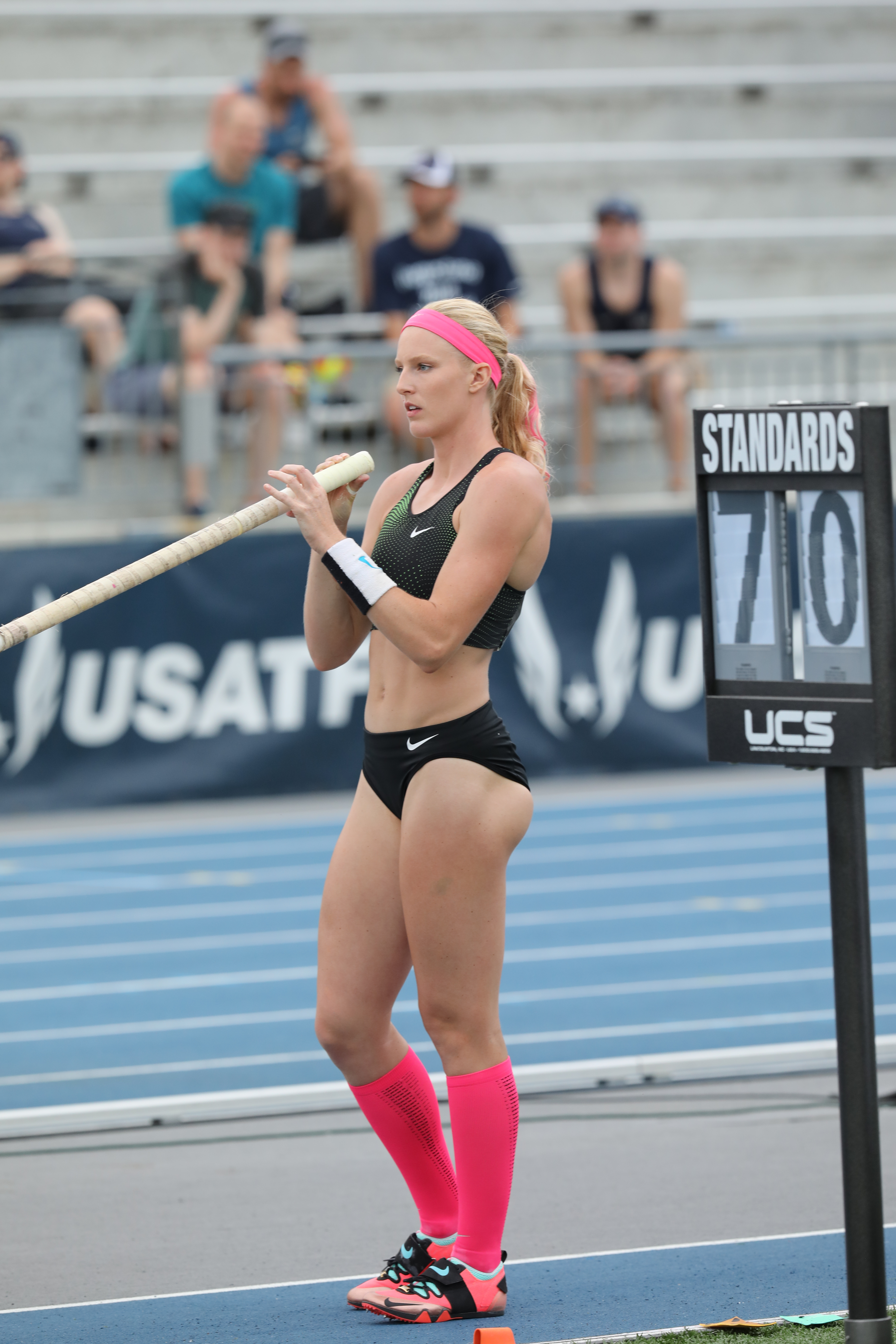
U.S. Olympics medalist Sandi Morris during a pole vault event

Greater media coverage and the growth of professional leagues like the WNBA and NWSL have enhanced the visibility and opportunities for female athletes. Efforts like the USWNT’s fight for equal pay and the ongoing impact of Title IX have been pivotal in advancing gender equality in sports. Female athletes are increasingly featured in media, but fewer resources compared to men’s sports, and instances of abuse have highlighted ongoing struggles.

Women are making strides in coaching (women like Becky Hammon, Kara Lawson, Kim Mulkey, Kendall Coyne Schofield), administration (Women like Kathy Carter, Heather Lyke, Cindy Parlow Cone, Linda G. Alvarado), and emerging fields like esports, though challenges remain in achieving full equity. platforms like ESPNW have emerged to focus specifically on women in sports. The NWSL, in particular, has seen increased visibility and investment, with teams like the Portland Thorns, Seattle Reign, Angel City, and San Diego Wave gaining strong followings. Serena Williams has dominated tennis and become a major advocate for gender equality. Megan Rapinoe has excelled in soccer and championed equal pay and LGBTQ+ rights. Simone Biles has set new records in gymnastics and promoted mental health awareness. Hilary Knight is widely regarded as one of the top American women’s hockey players of all time, Knight has been a dominant force in international competition, the NWHL (later PHF), and the PWHL. She has won multiple medals with Team USA, including gold at the 2018 and 2026 Winter Olympics and silver at the 2010, 2014, and 2022 Olympics. Knight is known for her exceptional scoring ability and leadership on and off the ice. While far from the only factor, Caitlin Clark has been credited with huge increases in women's basketball attendance, media interest, and cultural relevance in the 2020s.

=== Minority involvement ===
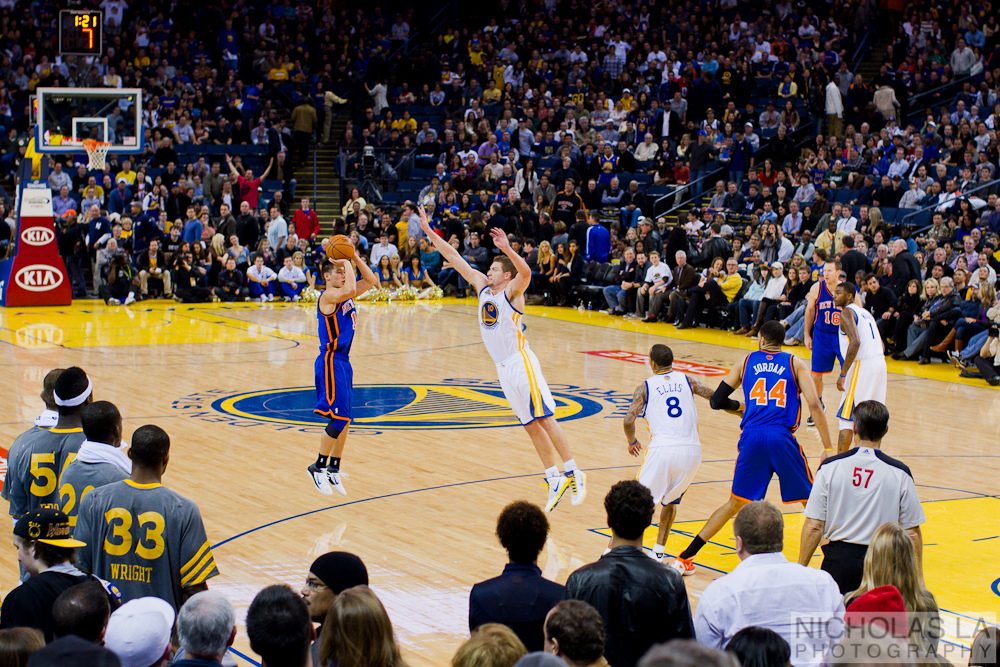
Jeremy Lin, Taiwanese-descent basketball player known for his "Linsanity" period with the New York Knicks

Some noticeable minorities include Alex Rodriguez, an influential Major League Baseball (MLB) player of Dominican descent, Rodriguez is considered one of the greatest shortstops and third basemen in baseball history. Monica Puig is a Puerto Rican former professional tennis player. Javier Báez is a Puerto Rican MLB infielder known for his dynamic play with the Chicago Cubs and Detroit Tigers. A member of the Confederated Tribes of the Umatilla Indian Reservation, Shoni Schimmel is a standout in women's basketball.

=== League expansion ===
The NHL expanded with new teams, including the Vegas Golden Knights (2017) and Seattle Kraken (2021), and saw team relocations like the Arizona Coyotes becoming the Utah Mammoth. Major League Soccer has seen significant growth, both in terms of expansion teams and popularity, with cities like Atlanta and Seattle becoming notable soccer hubs. Several sports teams have also changed their names to reduce their association with indigenous culture.

The market for professional sports in the United States in 2012 is $69 billion (about 50% larger than that of all of Europe, the Middle East, and Africa combined.)

=== New sports ===
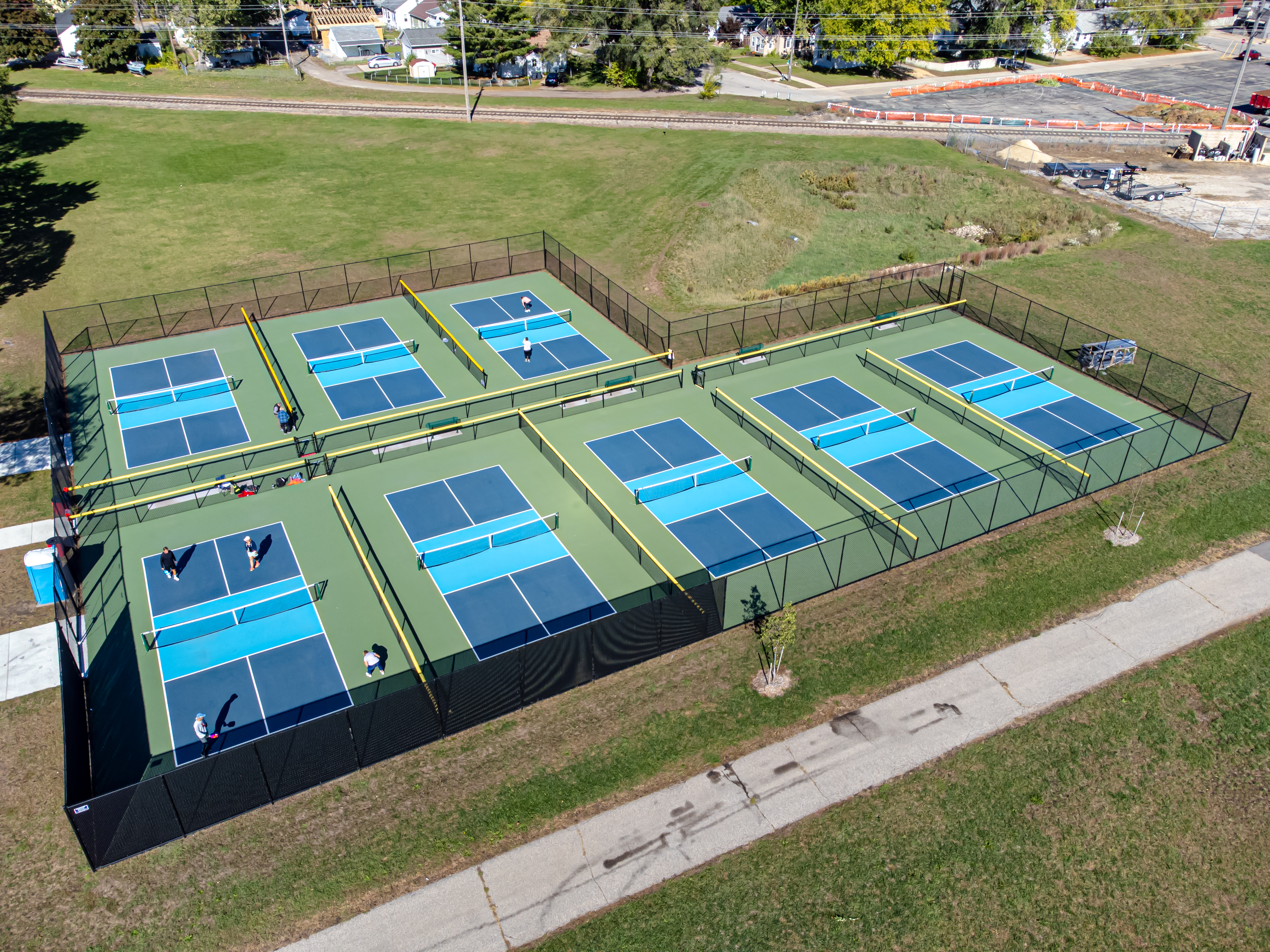
Pickleball courts have grown across the nation, often replacing tennis courts due to their greater compactness

Several new or emerging sports have gained traction in the USA during the 21st century, most notably pickleball. Though invented in 1965, pickleball saw rapid growth in the new century. Two pro pickleball tours were independently formed in 2019, the Association of Pickleball Players (APP) and the Professional Pickleball Association (PPA). A professional pickleball league, Major League Pickleball (MLP), was formed in 2021, and a senior professional league, the National Pickleball League of Champions Pros (NPL), was formed in 2022. The COVID-19 pandemic is credited with drawing even more people to the sport, and in 2021, 2022, and 2023, the sport was named the fastest-growing sport in the United States by the Sports and Fitness Industry Association.

Other emerging sports include Disc golf and Roller derby. Disc golf involves throwing a disc into a series of target baskets, with rules similar to traditional golf. The sport has gained a following due to its low cost and accessibility. Roller derby, a contact sport played on roller skates, has seen a resurgence in the 21st century. It is known for its fast pace, strategy, and unique team dynamics. The Women's Flat Track Derby Association (WFTDA) has helped organize and promote the sport, leading to increased visibility and participation. Cricket has also had a small resurgence due to immigration from cricket-playing countries and the 2023 launch of Major League Cricket.

== International history ==
=== American sports abroad ===
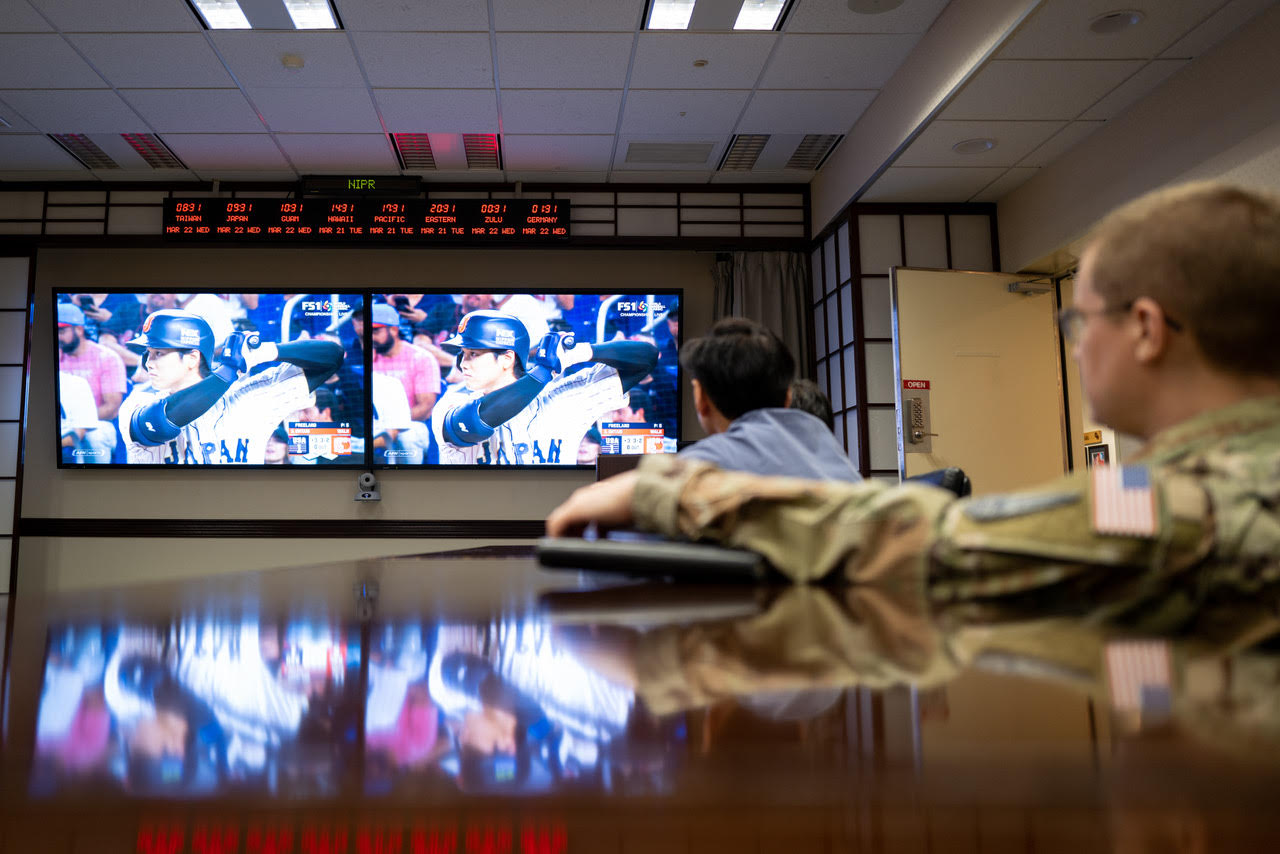
American military in Japan watching the two countries in the 2023 World Baseball Classic final

Baseball's international spread is largely because of historical American influence on the rest of the world; the sport was seen as being connected to military ventures abroad. The desire to spread baseball came partially from the American values it was said to impart, as it was identified in the late 19th century as being egalitarian in nature. It is now prevalent in parts of Latin America and the Asia-Pacific, having become an integral part of local cultures.

Basketball and other American sports also played a role in spreading American influence into the world. In addition, the United States's influence played a role in elevating and altering the role of sports in general on a global level, such as in the Olympic Games. Sports first became part of governmental efforts to engage with the world during the Cold War.

Several North American sports leagues have expanded their presence abroad, hosting exhibition or even seasonal games in other countries. The popularity of American sports merchandise, such as baseball caps, has also contributed to international popularity.

=== Foreign influences ===
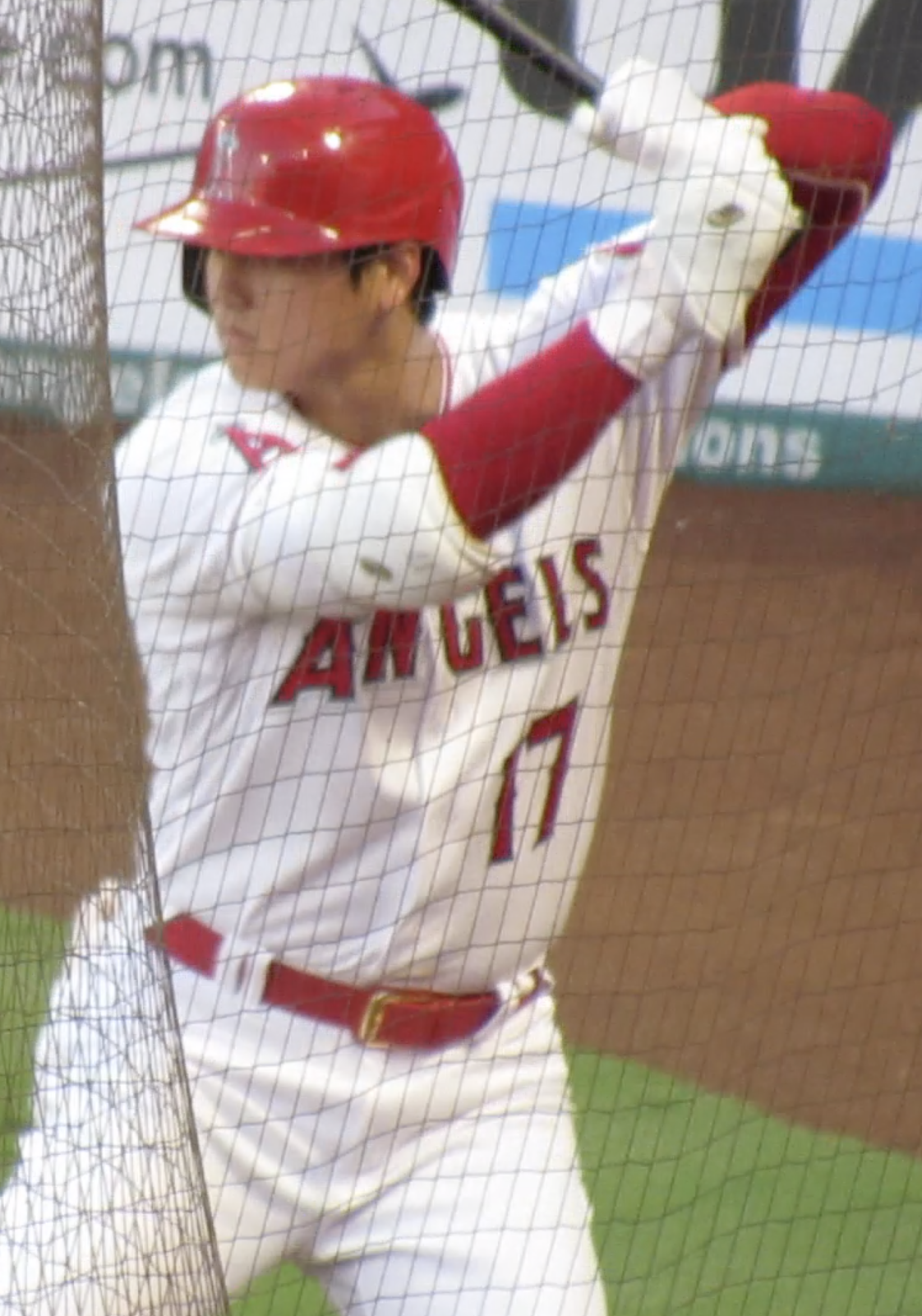
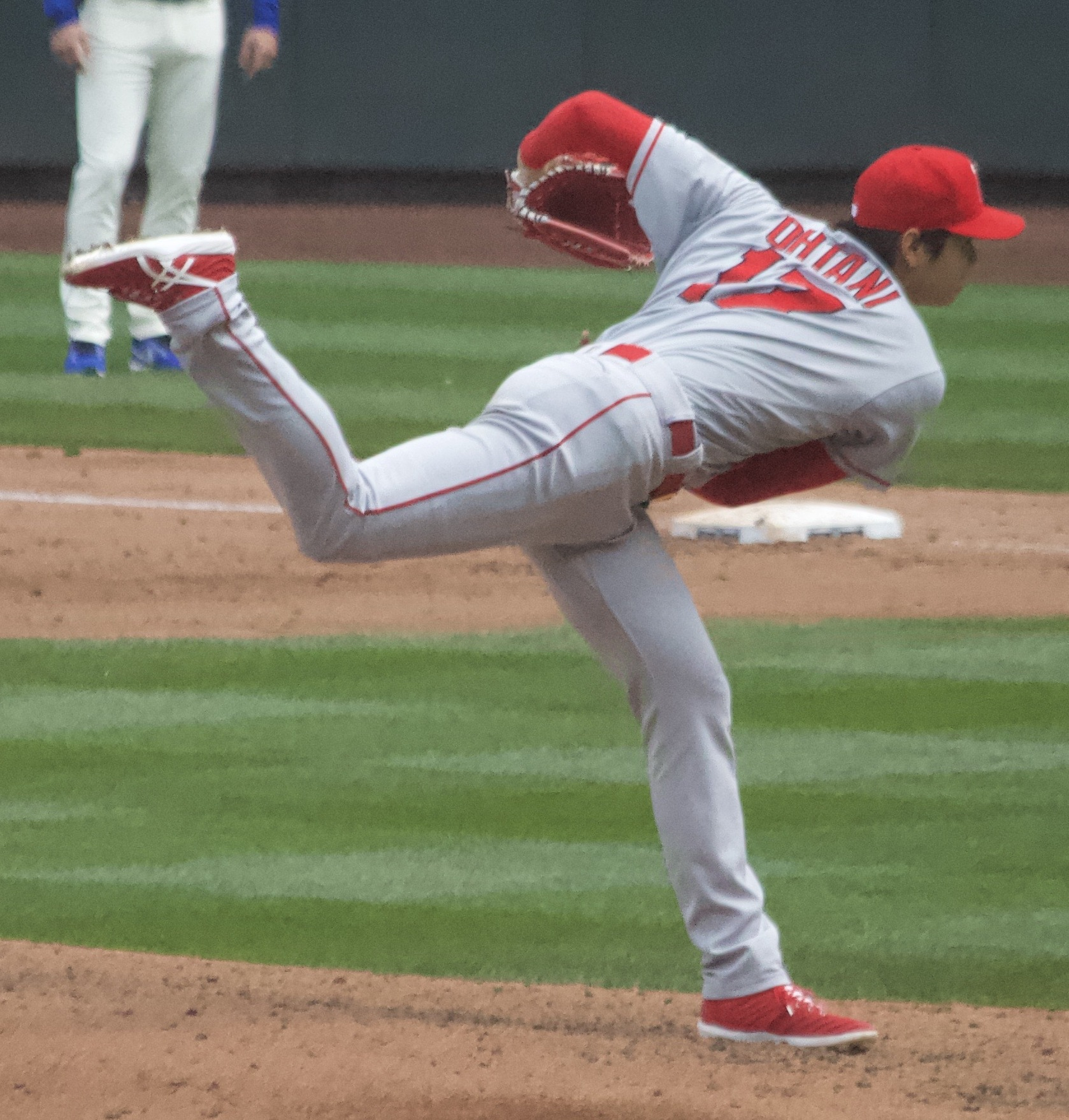
Japan's Shohei Ohtani has become the most famous modern two-way baseball player (succeeding at hitting and pitching)

The NHL has increasingly featured international players, contributing to a more global game and raising the profile of hockey outside North America. 27% of MLB's players are estimated to have been born abroad.

=== International competition ===
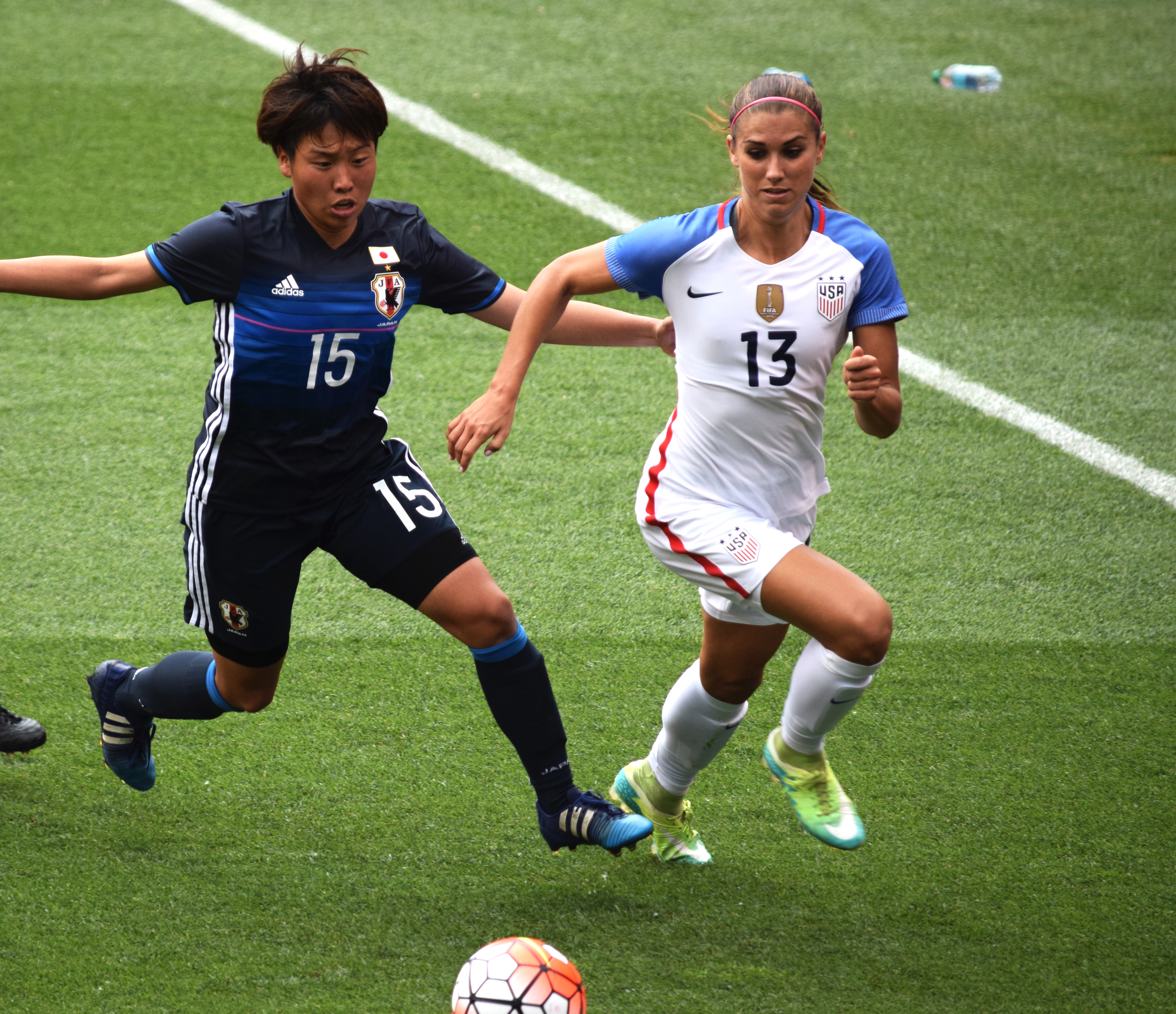
Alex Morgan being challenged by Hikari Takagi (15) during a match against Japan in Cleveland on June 5, 2016. During the 2019 FIFA Women's Soccer World Cup, Morgan netted a record-breaking five goals in a single game

The USWNT has been dominant in international women’s soccer, winning the FIFA Women’s World Cup in 2015 and 2019, and has been a leading force in advocating for gender equality in sports.

==== Olympics ====
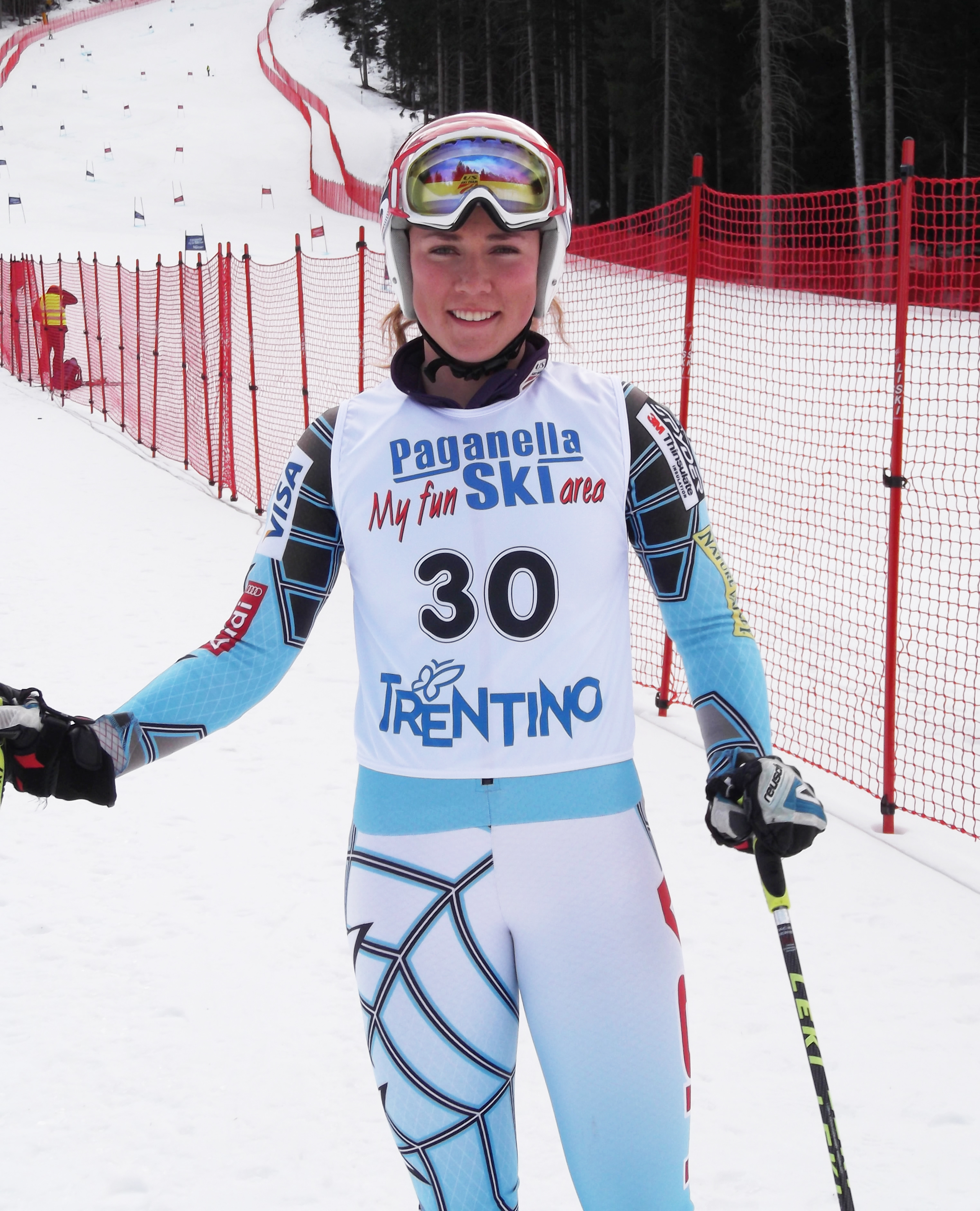
Mikaela Shiffrin with two Olympic gold medals, three World Championships, and 66 World Cup wins (and counting), Mikaela Shiffrin is one of the best Alpine skiers in history.

Eight Olympic Games have taken place in the United States. The United States has won 2,522 medals at the Summer Olympic Games, more than any other country, and 281 in the Winter Olympic Games, the second most behind Norway. These athletes are renowned for their exceptional performances and have set remarkable records in their respective sports Michael Phelps, Mark Spitz.

== Sports in entertainment industry ==
Professional wrestling in the U.S. is a major entertainment industry combining athleticism with scripted storylines. WWE (World Wrestling Entertainment) is the largest and most prominent organization, known for its high-profile events like WrestleMania and widespread global reach. AEW (All Elite Wrestling) has emerged as a significant competitor, offering an alternative with its own distinct style and growing fan base. The independent wrestling scene also plays a crucial role, showcasing emerging talent and diverse wrestling styles. Overall, professional wrestling continues to captivate audiences with its unique blend of sports and entertainment. TNA (Total Nonstop Action Wrestling) is a prominent professional wrestling promotion in the U.S. Notable professional wrestlers from the U.S. include Bruno Sammartino, June Byers, Buddy Rogers, Wendi Richter, Hulk Hogan, Randy "Macho Man" Savage, Madusa, Stone Cold Steve Austin, The Rock, Sable, Mick Foley, and John Cena. The Rock went on to become an A-list film actor under his real name of Dwayne Johnson, and Cena has also transitioned to a successful acting career.

== See also ==
- History of sport
  - History of sport in Australia
  - History of sports in Canada
  - History of sport in the United Kingdom
- Sociology of sport
- Major professional sports leagues in the United States and Canada
  - College athletics
  - National Federation of State High School Associations
  - University and college rivalry
- Western physical culture

=== Specific sports ===
- Baseball in the United States
  - Major League Baseball
- National Basketball Association
  - College basketball
- American football
  - College football
- National Hockey League
- Soccer in the United States
- Volleyball in the United States

=== Communities ===
- Race and sports in the United States
  - African Americans in sports
  - Asian Americans in sports
  - Hispanic and Latino athletes in American sports
  - Native Americans in the United States#Sports
  - Non-Hispanic whites#Sports
- Women's sports in the United States
- Youth sports in the United States
- Homosexuality in sports in the United States

== Online resources ==
- "Sports library of downloaded scholarly articles". la84.org. Archived from the original on February 20, 2016.
- 828 historic photographs of American sporting events and personalities; these are pre-1923 and out of copyright.
