= History of sport in the United Kingdom =

Many British sports spread throughout the modern world with the British Empire and globalisation, and were invented during the Industrial Revolution. Some sports were only standardised during that time period, and had been played for centuries beforehand.

== Ancient era ==
A Roman-era stadium for gladiators was discovered in 2023 in Colchester, England.

== Medieval era ==
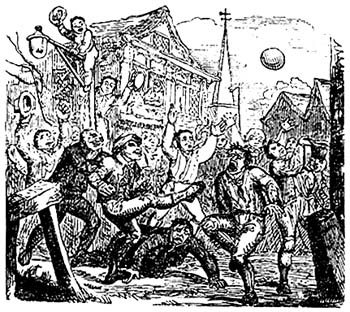
A 1721 illustration of so-called "mob football", a variety of medieval football

Medieval football is a modern term used for a wide variety of the localised informal football games that were invented and played in Europe during the Middle Ages. Alternative names include folk football, mob football and Shrovetide football. These games may be regarded as the ancestors of modern codes of football, and by comparison with later forms of football, the medieval matches had few rules and were chaotic.

== Modern era ==
=== 16th century ===
In the Elizabethan era (1558–1603), there was a wide range of leisure activities entertaining both the nobility and the common classes. Among these leisure activities were animal fighting, team sports, individual sports, games, dramatics, music and the arts.

=== 17th century ===
Leech has explained the role of Puritan power, the English Civil War, and the Restoration of the monarchy in England. The Long Parliament in 1642 "banned theaters, which had met with Puritan disapproval. Although similar action would be taken against certain sports, it is not clear if cricket was in any way prohibited, except that players must not break the Sabbath". In 1660, "the Restoration of the monarchy in England was immediately followed by the reopening of the theaters, and so any sanctions that had been imposed by the Puritans on cricket would also have been lifted." He goes on to make the key point that political, social, and economic conditions in the aftermath of the Restoration encouraged excessive gambling, so much so, that a Gambling Act was deemed necessary in 1664. It is certain that cricket, horse racing, and boxing (i.e., prizefighting) were financed by gambling interests. Leech explains that it was the habit of cricket patrons, all of whom were gamblers, to form strong teams through the 18th century to represent their interests. He defines a strong team as one representative of more than one parish, and he is certain that such teams were first assembled in or immediately after 1660.

Prior to the English Civil War and the Commonwealth, all available evidence concludes that cricket had evolved to the level of village cricket, where only teams that are strictly representative of individual parishes compete. The "strong teams" of the post-Restoration mark the evolution of cricket (and, indeed of professional team sport, for cricket is the oldest professional team sport) from the parish standard to the county standard. This was the point of origin for major, or first-class, cricket. The year 1660 also marks the origin of professional team sports.

=== Cricket ===
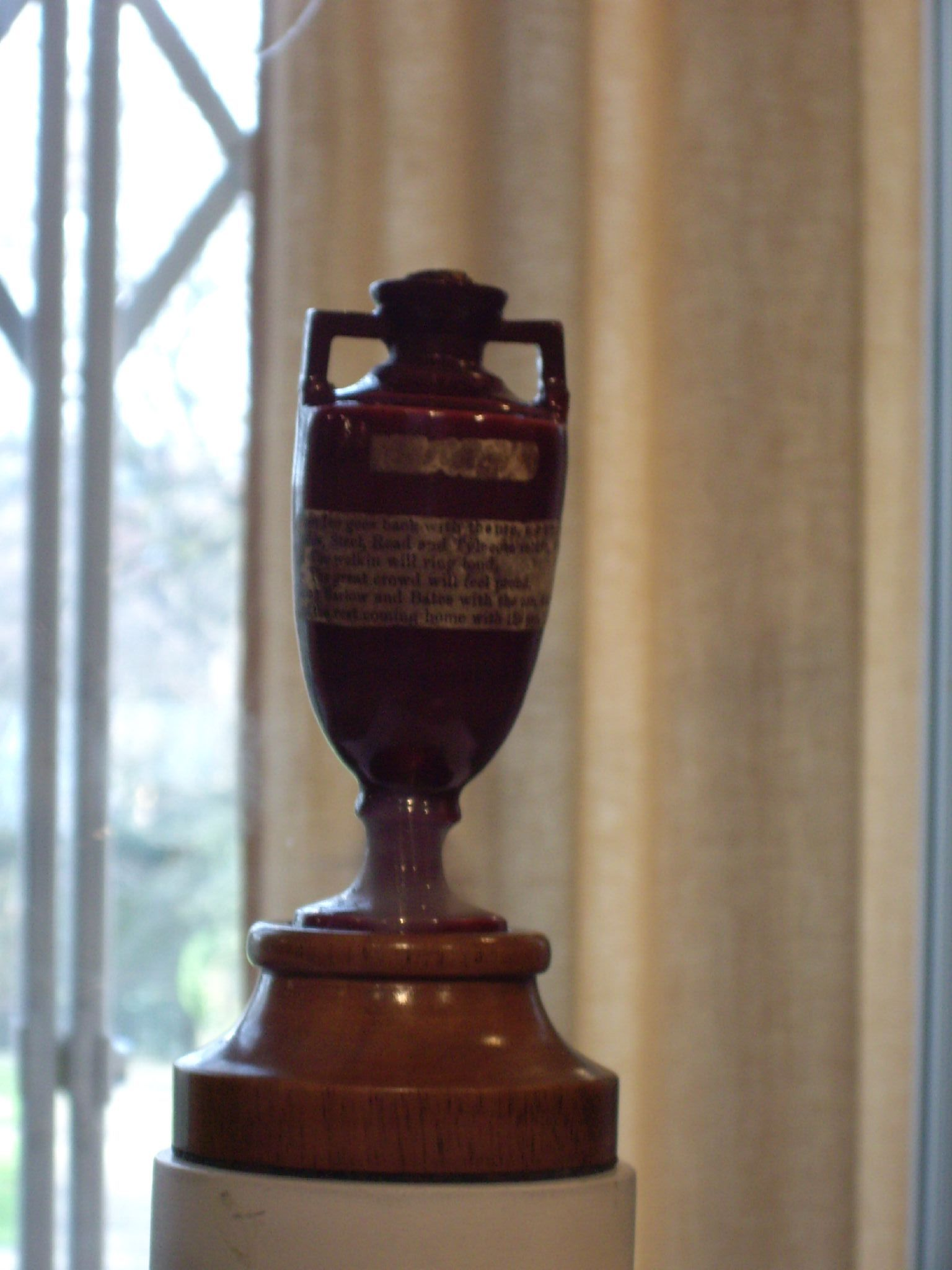
The Ashes urn, competed for between Australia and England in cricket

Cricket had become well-established among the English upper class in the 18th century, and was a major factor in sports competition among the public schools.

Army units around the Empire had time on their hands, and encouraged the locals to learn cricket so they could have some entertaining competition. Most of the Empire embraced cricket, with the exception of Canada (see also: Cricket in South Asia). Cricket test matches (international) began by the 1870s; the first and most famous rivalry is that between Australia and England for "The Ashes."

=== Public schools ===
A number of the public schools such as Winchester and Eton, introduced variants of football and other sports for their pupils. These were described at the time as "innocent and lawful", certainly in comparison with the rougher rural games. With urbanization in the 19th century, the rural games moved to the new urban centers and came under the influence of the middle and upper classes. The rules and regulations devised at English institutions began to be applied to the wider game, with governing bodies in England being set up for a number of sports by the end of the 19th century.

The rising influence of the upper class also produced an emphasis on the amateur, and the spirit of "fair play". The industrial revolution also brought with it increasing mobility, and created the opportunity for universities in Britain and elsewhere to compete with one another. This sparked increasing attempts to unify and reconcile various games in England, leading to the establishment of the Football Association in London, the first official governing body in football.

For sports to become professionalized, coaching had to come first. It gradually professionalized in the Victorian era and the role was well established by 1914. In the First World War, military units sought out the coaches to supervise physical conditioning and develop morale-building teams.

=== Sports culture ===
British Prime Minister John Major was the political leader most closely identified with promotion of sports. In 1995 he argued:

"We invented the majority of the world's great sports.... 19th century Britain was the cradle of a leisure revolution every bit as significant as the agricultural and industrial revolutions we launched in the century before."

The British showed a more profound interest in sports, and in greater variety, than any rival. This was chiefly due to the development of the railway network in the UK before other nations. Allowing for national newspapers, and travel around the country far earlier than in other places. They gave pride of place to such moral issues as sportsmanship and fair play.

Cricket became symbolic of the Imperial spirit throughout the Empire. Football proved highly attractive to the urban working classes, which introduced the rowdy spectator to the sports world. In some sports, there was significant controversy in the fight for amateur purity especially in rugby and rowing. New games became popular almost overnight, including lawn tennis, cycling and hockey. Women were much more likely to enter these sports than the old established ones. The aristocracy and landed gentry, with their ironclad control over land rights, dominated hunting, shooting, fishing and horse racing.

Many modern Olympic sports trace their roots back to Britain, including sports that are not commonly considered particularly British sports today, such as table tennis and bobsleigh.

=== British Empire ===
The influence of British sports and their codified rules began to spread across the world in the late 19th and early 20th centuries. A number of major teams elsewhere in the world still show these British origins in their names, such as A.C. Milan in Italy, Grêmio Foot-Ball Porto Alegrense in Brazil, and Athletic Bilbao in Spain. Cricket became popular in several of the nations of the then British Empire, such as Australia, South Africa, and South Asian nations such as India, Sri Lanka and Pakistan (see also: Sport in British India). Today, 90% of the sport's fans are in the subcontinent, with the game remaining popular in and beyond today's Commonwealth of Nations. The revival of the Olympic Games by Baron Pierre de Coubertin was also heavily influenced by the amateur ethos of the English public schools. The British played a major role in defining amateurism, professionalism, the tournament system and the concept of fair play. Some sports developed in England, spread to other countries and then lost its popularity in England while remaining actively played in other countries, a notable example being bandy which remains popular in Finland, Kazakhstan, Norway, Russia, and Sweden.

European morals and views on empires were embedded in the structure of sports. Ideas of "social discipline" and "loyalty" were key factors in European empire etiquette, which eventually transferred into sports etiquette. Also ideas of "patient and methodical training", were enforced to make soldiers stronger, and athletes better. Diffusion helped with the process of connecting these two concepts and has helped shaped the values of sports as we know it today. Sports like baseball, football (soccer), and cricket all came from European influence, and all share the same values based on European empires. In the case of the British Empire, the victory of the colonies in sports helped in transitioning out of empire.

Worldwide, the British influence includes many different football codes, lawn bowls, lawn tennis and other sports. The major impetus for this was the patenting of the world's first lawn mower in 1830. This allowed for the preparation of modern ovals, playing fields, pitches, grass courts, etc.

=== Victorian era ===
The Victorians saw sport as a way to increase physical discipline and spiritual connection. Scholars of the time looking back at sporting culture in ancient Greece and elsewhere often reinterpreted the practices of those times to be more in line with Victorian efforts.

== Contemporary era ==
The decline of the British Empire saw cricket, which had been the most popular British sport for centuries and which had become identified with the imperial vision, lose ground to football.

== See also ==
- British Universities and Colleges Sport § History
- History of sport § Development of modern sports
- History of sport in England
- Intramural sports § History
- List of British and Irish varsity matches
- Student athlete § Historical perspective
- University and college sport § United Kingdom
- Varsity team
- Western sports
