= Hillbilly 100 =

- Venue: West Virginia Motor Speedway
- Location: Mineral Wells, West Virginia
- First race: 1967
- Laps: 100
- Most wins (driver): Bob Wearing, Sr. (4)

Circuit information
- Surface: Clay
- Length: 3/8 mi (0.60 km)

The Hillbilly 100 is an annual dirt Super Late Model "Crown Jewel" race held every year on Labor Day weekend. The Hillbilly Hundred, promoted by famed event promoter Carl Short, is the oldest running super late model event and brings enormous history and tradition to the state of West Virginia. Started in 1967, the Hillbilly 100 was held at Pennsboro Speedway every year until 1998, when the race was moved to Tyler County Speedway in Middlebourne, West Virginia. Then in 2010 the race moved to West Virginia Motor Speedway, and once again in 2012 to I-77 Raceway Park up until 2016. When the Hillbilly 100 was moved back to Tyler County Speedway where the 2009 event had a purse in excess of $125,000, with $1,000 to start the feature and $41,000 to win. As of 2017, the race has a purse of $25,000. In 2018, the 50th annual Hillbilly 100 promoter Carl Short paid $50,000 to win. The race was moved back to the West Virginia Motor Speedway in Mineral Wells, West Virginia for 2026.

Other events included in the two-day Hillbilly weekend are:

- Hillbilly 50 - Steel block late models
- Outhouse 30 - Modifides
- White Lightning 25 - Semi-Mods
- Sour Mash 20 - Mod Lites

== See also ==
- Dirt track racing in the United States
- National Dirt Late Model Hall of Fame
