= List of Sporting Club Jacksonville (women) players =

Sporting Club Jacksonville is an American professional women's soccer club which began play in the second season of the USL Super League. All players who have made a competitive appearance for Sporting Club Jacksonville are listed below.

== Key ==
- The list is ordered alphabetically.
- Appearances as a substitute are included.
- Statistics are correct as of May 30, 2026, the end of the 2025–26 USL Super League season, and are updated once a year after the conclusion of the USL Super League season.
- Players whose names are highlighted in **bold** were active players on the Sporting JAX roster as of the list's most recent update.

Positions key
GK	Goalkeeper
DF	Defender
MF	Midfielder
FW	Forward

Nationality
Unless otherwise noted, the nationality of a player is determined by the country they most recently represented in international play, or if said player has not played international football then by their country of birth.
Position
Playing positions are listed according to the player's roster designation as of the list's most recent update.
Years
Years are defined as the first and last calendar years in which the player was rostered for the club in any of the competitions listed below.
Appearances and goals
This list counts appearances and goals in the USL Super League and USL Super League playoffs.

== Players ==
Yrs	No.	Pos	Nat	Player	Total		USL Super League		Playoffs	
Yrs	No.	Pos	Nat	Player	Apps	Goals	Apps	Goals	Apps	Goals
2025–	3	MF	(United States) USA	Sophia Boman	29	6	28	6	1	0
2026–	9	MF	(United States) USA	Abby Boyan	7	1	6	1	1	0
2025–	5	DF	(Scotland) SCO	Georgia Brown (Note: Georgia Brown and Ashlyn Puerta were Sporting JAX's inaugural signings, announced on May 21, 2025.)	27	2	26	2	1	0
2025–	17	MF	(United States) USA	Baylee DeSmit	25	12	24	12	1	0
2025–	11	FW	(Spain) ESP	Andrea Fernández	18	1	18	1	0	0
2025–	1	GK	(Germany) GER	Jamie Gerstenberg	6	0	6	0	0	0
2025–	10	FW	(United States) USA	Meg Hughes	29	2	28	2	1	0
2026–	21	DF	(United States) USA	Maggie Illig	13	0	12	0	1	0
2025–	6	MF	(United States) USA	Jessie Hunt	20	0	19	0	1	0
2025–	8	MF	(United States) USA	Sophie Jones	29	0	28	0	1	0
2025–	4	FW	(United States) USA	Maddie Kemp	10	1	10	1	0	0
2025–	27	FW	(United States) USA	Paige Kenton	29	10	28	10	1	0
2025–	20	DF	(United States) USA	Julia Lester	21	0	21	0	0	0
2025–	12	FW	(United States) USA	Caroline Murray	13	0	13	0	0	0
2025–	13	GK	(United States) USA	Kaitlyn Parks	24	0	23	0	1	0
2025–	7	FW	(England) ENG	Jade Pennock (Note: Pennock scored Sporting JAX's first-ever goal, which came against DC Power FC on August 23, 2025.)	26	3	25	3	1	0
2025–	24	DF	(United States) USA	Grace Phillpotts	28	0	27	0	1	0
2025–	19	MF	(United States) USA	Ashlyn Puerta	28	12	27	12	1	0
2025–	2	MF	(United States) USA	Parker Roberts	9	0	8	0	1	0
2025	14	DF	(United States) USA	Sydney Schmidt	2	0	2	0	0	0
2026–	33	MF	(United States) USA	Kacey Smekrud	14	1	14	1	0	0
2025–	15	FW	(United States) USA	Katie Sullivan	13	2	13	2	0	0
2025–	23	DF	(Tonga) TGA	Daviana Vaka	8	0	8	0	0	0

== By nationality ==
In total, 23 players representing 5 different countries have appeared for Sporting JAX.

Note: Countries indicate national team as defined under FIFA eligibility rules. Players may hold more than one non-FIFA nationality.

Country	Total players
England	1
Germany	1
Scotland	1
Spain	1
Tonga	1
United States	18

== See also ==
- List of top-division football clubs in CONCACAF countries
- List of professional sports teams in the United States and Canada
