= 2025–26 Sporting Club Jacksonville (women) season =

Sporting JAX women's inaugural season in the USL Super League

Sporting Club Jacksonville
2025–26 season
- Sporting director Head of Soccer: Mark Warburton
- Head coach: Stacey Balaam
- Stadium: Hodges Stadium
- USL Super League: 2nd
- Top goalscorer: Baylee DeSmit; Ashlyn Puerta (12 goals)
- Highest home attendance: 9,783
- Lowest home attendance: 1,120
- Average home league attendance: 7,494
- Biggest win: 4–0 (vs DAL (A), March 22, 2026)
- Biggest defeat: 3 matches by 2 goals
Home colors	Away colors	Third colors
- All statistics correct as of 24 May 2026.

The 2025–26 season is the inaugural season for Sporting Club Jacksonville and the club's first in the USL Super League (USLS), one of two leagues sanctioned as the top tier of women's soccer in the United States.

== Background ==
More commonly known as Sporting JAX, the club was awarded a franchise in the USL Super League in May 2023 and officially unveiled its name and branding in December of the same year. The club appointed former Vanderbilt associate head coach Stacey Balaam as its first head coach in April 2025.

The team plays its home matches at Hodges Stadium on the campus of the University of North Florida while a new soccer-specific stadium is under development.

Average 2025–26 starting XI

== Roster and staff ==
=== Roster ===
As of March 24, 2026

Note: Flags indicate national team as defined under FIFA eligibility rules; some limited exceptions apply. Players may hold more than one non-FIFA nationality.

No.	Pos.	Nation	Player
1	GK	GER	Jamie Gerstenberg
2	MF	USA	Parker Roberts (vice-captain)
3	MF	USA	Sophia Boman
4	FW	USA	Maddie Kemp
5	DF	SCO	Georgia Brown
6	MF	USA	Jessie Hunt
7	FW	ENG	Jade Pennock
8	MF	USA	Sophie Jones (captain)
9	MF	USA	Abby Boyan
10	FW	USA	Meg Hughes
11	FW	ESP	Andrea Fernández
12	FW	USA	Caroline Murray
13	GK	USA	Kaitlyn Parks

No.	Pos.	Nation	Player
15	FW	USA	Katie Sullivan
17	MF	USA	Baylee DeSmit
19	MF	USA	Ashlyn Puerta
20	DF	USA	Julia Lester
21	DF	USA	Maggie Illig
22	DF	USA	Zara Siassi
23	DF	TGA	Daviana Vaka
24	DF	USA	Grace Phillpotts
27	DF	USA	Paige Kenton
32	GK	PUR	Cristina Roque (on loan from Racing Louisville FC)
33	MF	USA	Kacey Smekrud
36	MF	USA	Coco Thistle

=== Out on loan ===
Note: Flags indicate national team as defined under FIFA eligibility rules; some limited exceptions apply. Players may hold more than one non-FIFA nationality.

No.	Pos.	Nation	Player
16	MF	NZL	Helena Errington (on loan to Fimleikafélag Hafnarfjarðar)

=== Academy players ===
Note: Flags indicate national team as defined under FIFA eligibility rules; some limited exceptions apply. Players may hold more than one non-FIFA nationality.

No.	Pos.	Nation	Player
14	MF	USA	Presley Cason
18	MF	USA	Sarah Weisberg

=== Ownership ===
As of November 24, 2025

Ownership
Majority owner	Ricky Caplin
Minority owner	Steve Livingstone
Minority owner	Tony Allegretti
Minority owner	Tim Tebow
Minority owner	Fred Taylor

=== Executive ===
As of November 24, 2025

Executive
Club President and CEO	Steve Livingstone
Executive Vice President of Business Management	J.J. Keitzer
Chief Community Officer	Tony Allegretti
Vice President of Ticket Sales & Service	Tim Hensley
Special Advisor to the President	Bob Ohrablo
Team Advisor	Becky Burleigh
Technical & Business Development Manager	Mauricio Ruiz
Director of Marketing and Brand	David Phillips
Director of Broadcasting and Digital Content	Cole Pepper
Director of Ticket Sales and Services	Jack Gonzalez
Senior Manager, Business Operations and Development	Sara Garcia-Malone
Head of Operations	Marshall Happer
Merchandise Manager	Anthony Ortiz

=== Technical staff ===
As of June 17, 2025

Position	Name
Head of Soccer, Sporting Director	(England) Mark Warburton
Head Coach	(England) Stacey Balaam
Associate Head Coach	(England) Alan Kirkup
Goalkeeper Coach	(United States) Mat Cosgriff
Head of Sports Performance	(United States) Steve Fell

== Transfers ==
=== In ===
Player	Previous Squad	Date	Ref.
(Scotland) Georgia Brown	(United States) South Florida Bulls	May 21, 2025	
Ashlyn Puerta	(United States) Florida State Seminoles	May 21, 2025	
(United States) Caroline Murray	(Iceland) Throttur	June 3, 2025	
Parker Roberts	(United States) Orlando Pride	June 3, 2025	
Zara Siassi	(United States) North Florida Ospreys	June 3, 2025	
(United States) Sophia Boman	(United States) Minnesota Golden Gophers	June 18, 2025	
Maddie Kemp	(United States) Kentucky Wildcats	June 18, 2025	
Paige Kenton	(United States) Delaware Fightin' Blue Hens	June 18, 2025	
Katie Sullivan	(Republic of Ireland) Athlone Town A.F.C. Ladies	June 18, 2025	
(United States) Baylee DeSmit	(United States) Loyola Greyhounds	June 26, 2025	
Andrea Fernández	(United States) Flagler Saints	June 26, 2025	
Jamie Gerstenberg	(United States) Indiana Hoosiers	June 26, 2025	
Jessie Hunt	(United States) Northeastern Huskies	June 26, 2025	
(New Zealand) Helena Errington	(New Zealand) Wellington Phoenix FC	July 1, 2025	
Meg Hughes	(United States) Michigan State Spartans	July 1, 2025	
Sophie Jones	(United States) Chicago Red Stars	July 1, 2025	
Kaitlyn Parks	(United States) Michigan State Spartans	July 1, 2025	
Jade Pennock	(Australia) Central Coast Mariners FC	July 1, 2025	
Grace Phillpotts	(United States) Brooklyn FC	July 1, 2025	
Daviana Vaka	(United States) Fort Lauderdale United FC	July 1, 2025	
(United States) Julia Lester	(United States) Seattle Reign FC	July 9, 2025	
(United States) Sydney Schmidt	(United States) Jacksonville FC	July 10, 2025	
Hailey Smith	(United States) Sporting JAX Soccer Academy	July 10, 2025	
Sarah Weisberg	(United States) Sporting JAX Soccer Academy	July 10, 2025	
(England) Libby Smith	(England) Birmingham City W.F.C.	September 9, 2025	
(United States) Kacey Smekrud	(Finland) Åland United	January 13, 2026	
Cristina Roque	(United States) Racing Louisville FC	January 13, 2026	
(United States) Maggie Illig	(United States) Michigan State Spartans	January 28, 2026	
(United States) Abby Boyan	(United States) Utah Royals	February 18, 2026	
Coco Thistle	(United States) California Golden Bears	February 18, 2026	
(United States) Presley Cason	(United States) IMG Academy	February 18, 2026	

=== Out ===
Player	Transferred To	Date	Ref.
(United States) Sydney Schmidt	(United States) North Carolina Courage	October 16, 2025	
(England) Libby Smith	Free agent	December 23, 2025	
(United States) Hailey Smith	(United States) Baylor Bears	January 2026	
(New Zealand) Helena Errington	(Iceland) FH	March 24, 2026	
(Tonga) Daviana Vaka	Free agent	May 20, 2026	

== Preseason ==
=== Training camp ===
Sporting JAX officially opened its inaugural preseason training camp on July 8, 2025, with sessions held at the Episcopal School of Jacksonville's Knight Sports Campus. The team began full-squad training in preparation for its debut season, focusing on tactical development, team-building, and fitness assessments ahead of scheduled scrimmages and international friendlies.

On July 15, 2025, Jacksonville Jaguars quarterback Trevor Lawrence visited the Sporting JAX women's team during their second week of training camp. Lawrence addressed the players ahead of their inaugural season, offering encouragement and support. His visit was seen as a gesture of solidarity between Jacksonville's professional sports teams, with Lawrence telling the players, “Represent the city well — we’re all rooting for you.” The team presented Lawrence with a personalized Sporting JAX jersey bearing the number 16.

On July 22, ahead of their first closed-door scrimmage against the Orlando Pride of the NWSL, head coach Stacey Balaam announced that Sophie Jones had been named team captain, with Parker Roberts serving as vice-captain.

As part of their preseason schedule, Sporting JAX is set to participate in three closed-door scrimmages against the aforementioned Orlando Pride, the University of Florida, and fellow USL Super League side Lexington SC.

The club will then host its first public preseason matches against Hibernian W.F.C., the 2025 Scottish Women's Premier League champions, and Welsh side Wrexham A.F.C. Women, widely known for their association with actors Ryan Reynolds and Rob McElhenney, through the Emmy Award-winning FX docuseries Welcome to Wrexham. These matches will mark Sporting JAX's first appearances in international competition.

On August 1, the club announced the postponement of its preseason match against Wrexham AFC Women, originally scheduled for August 10. The postponement was attributed to a number of injuries and limited player availability within the Wrexham squad, making it impossible for the team to travel and field a competitive side. Both clubs stated they are working to identify a new date for the fixture. Wrexham AFC Chairman Michael Williamson expressed disappointment and apologized to fans, while Sporting JAX President and CEO Steve Livingstone voiced support for Wrexham's decision and emphasized the club's commitment to player well-being and a strong inaugural season. As compensation, Sporting JAX announced plans to add a 16th home fixture for the 2025–26 season and offered refunds or ticket exchanges to fans affected by the postponement.

The preseason friendly between Sporting JAX and Hibernian W.F.C., originally scheduled for August 2, was canceled due to inclement weather, including heavy thunderstorms, and an unplayable field. The decision was made following a weather assessment prior to kickoff and forecasts of continued storms throughout the evening. Club officials expressed disappointment at the cancellation, citing safety concerns and unfavorable field conditions. Both teams explored the possibility of holding a closed-door scrimmage later the same night, weather permitting. Sporting JAX announced plans to schedule a replacement home fixture during the 2025–26 Gainbridge Super League season to maintain their 16-match slate and offered affected ticket holders a full refund or exchange.

On August 7, 2025, Sporting JAX hosted a free open training session at Veterans Park in St. Johns, Florida, for youth soccer players, coaches, and families across the First Coast. The event, presented by Ascension St. Vincent's, was organized following the cancellation of preseason matches against Hibernian FC and Wrexham AFC Women, and offered fans the opportunity to watch training, meet players, and collect autographs.

In mid-August 2025, vice-captain Parker Roberts sustained a right ACL injury, ruling her out for most of the season. In an interview, she stated that she hopes to return to play later in the season.

The full schedule for the 2025–26 USL Super League season was released on May 6, 2025. Sporting JAX opened their inaugural campaign at home against DC Power FC on August 23, 2025. The regular season will run through May 16, 2026, with matches primarily held on weekends.

== Regular season ==
Jade Pennock scored the first goal in club history during the season opener against DC Power FC. Sporting JAX ultimately lost 3 to 1. The club announced the number of total ticket sales for the inaugural match as 9,783.

On August 26, Sporting JAX announced a friendly against Kansas City Current II to replace the canceled friendly against Hibernian W.F.C. The new match was scheduled for September 19, 2025. They won the match 1–0.

In the club's second match on August 30, 2025, Ashlyn Puerta scored the team's first brace in a 3–2 victory over Tampa Bay Sun FC, earning Sporting JAX their first win. She would go on to score the club's first Hat-trick on September 28, 2025, in a 4–3 victory over Carolina Ascent FC.

On September 16, Jacksonville Jaguars placekicker Cam Little visited a Sporting JAX training session. During the visit, he participated in various soccer-related activities, including juggling and accuracy challenges. In recognition of his participation, the club presented him with a personalized No. 39 jersey. Prior to his transition to American football, Little had a background in soccer.

For her outstanding performances in September 2025, Ashlyn Puerta was named USL Super League Player of the Month—marking the first time a player from the club has received this honor. Puerta, along with teammate Julia Lester, was also named to the USL Super League Team of the Month for September.

On October 14, Kaitlyn Parks recorded the club's first clean sheet in a 1–0 victory over DC Power FC. On November 6, she won the USL Super League Save of the Month for a high-rising save made during the match.

Two days later, on October 16, Sporting JAX academy player, Sydney Schmidt, was signed to a professional contract by North Carolina Courage of the National Women's Soccer League (NWSL).

Sporting JAX secured their first official home win, a 2–0 victory over Fort Lauderdale United FC, on November 22, 2025. During the match, Ashlyn Puerta scored her tenth goal of the season in her eleventh match, setting a USL Super League record for the fastest player to reach ten goals.

In December, the club earned its second USL Super League Player of the Month honor in three months when Paige Kenton was recognized for November 2025, having recorded two goals and one assist on six shots during the month.

Although an expansion team, a 3–1 victory over Tampa Bay Sun FC on December 20, 2025, placed Sporting JAX atop the USL Super League standings at the winter break. With her 11th goal at the season's midpoint, Ashlyn Puerta moved within two of the 13 goals that secured the previous season's Golden Boot.

For her coaching efforts in December 2025, Balaam was named USL Super League Coach of the Month. The team went 2–0–1 and took the lead in the league standings over Lexington SC.

In March 2026, goalkeeper Kaitlyn Parks was named USL Super League Player of the Month for her contributions made during the month of February. She allowed only one goal and the team won three of four matches.

Sporting JAX clinched a playoff berth in its inaugural season on April 6, following Fort Lauderdale United's 3–1 victory over DC Power, which mathematically eliminated DC Power from surpassing Jacksonville in the standings. The club, at the time of clinching the playoff spot, was in first place with 44 points and had six regular-season matches remaining, including two home fixtures.

== Uniforms ==
During the 2025–26 season, Sporting JAX used two variations of their away kit: one featuring white socks and another featuring blue socks.

In October 2025, for a match against Tampa Bay Sun FC, the team wore pink socks in tribute to Breast Cancer Awareness Month.

Away Alternate	Breast Cancer Awareness

== Broadcasting ==
In August 2025, Sporting JAX announced a broadcast partnership ahead of its inaugural season. The agreement includes local television coverage of most home matches through partnerships with First Coast News (WTLV NBC 12/WJXX ABC 25) and News4Jax (WJXT 4), making matches accessible to viewers across Northeast Florida and Southeast Georgia. Select Saturday home games will air on WJXT Channel 4, while additional matches will be broadcast on WJXX ABC 25, WTLV NBC 12, and QUEST 25.3. The season opener, along with all home and away fixtures, will also stream on Peacock, in line with league broadcasting regulations. The club's leadership emphasized the importance of regional accessibility and community engagement through local media partnerships.

== Competitions ==
=== Friendlies ===
August 2, 2025 1	Sporting JAX (United States)	Canceled	(Scotland) Hibernian W.F.C.	Jacksonville, Florida
7:00 PM ET				Stadium: Hodges Stadium
Note: Match canceled due to inclement weather, including heavy thunderstorms, and an unplayable field.

August 10, 2025 2	Sporting JAX (United States)	Postponed	(Wales) Wrexham A.F.C. Women	Jacksonville, Florida
7:00 PM ET				Stadium: Hodges Stadium
Note: Match postponed due to injuries and player unavailability within the Wrexham squad; to be rescheduled.

September 19, 2025 3	Sporting JAX (United States)	1–0	(United States) Kansas City Current II	Jacksonville, Florida
7:30 PM ET	Kemp (yellow card) 48'; Fernández 63'; Vaka (yellow card) 76'		Ogden (yellow card) 14'; Gordon (yellow card) 45+2'; (yellow card) 1st half'; Kaufusi (yellow card) 49'	Stadium: Hodges Stadium; Referee: Joan Hyland
Note: Match scheduled to replace canceled Hibernian match.

=== USL Super League ===
==== League table ====
Pos	Team	Pld	W	L	T	GF	GA	GD	Pts	Qualification
1	Lexington (C, S)	28	14	3	11	50	24	+26	53	Playoffs
2	Sporting JAX	28	16	7	5	54	32	+22	53	Playoffs
3	Carolina Ascent	28	15	7	6	39	27	+12	51	Playoffs
4	Dallas Trinity	28	11	10	7	36	40	−4	40	Playoffs
5	Spokane Zephyr	28	10	9	9	34	28	+6	39	

Updated to match(es) played on May 16, 2026. Source: Gainbridge Super League
Rules for classification: 1) head-to-head points; 2) total goal differential; 3) total goals scored; 4) disciplinary points; 5) drawing of lots.
(C) Champions; (S) Players' Shield winner

==== Results summary ====
Overall								Home						Away					
Pld	W	D	L	GF	GA	GD	Pts	W	D	L	GF	GA	GD	W	D	L	GF	GA	GD
28	16	5	7	54	32	+22	53	6	4	4	20	14	+6	10	1	3	34	18	+16

Last updated: May 16, 2026.
Source: GainbridgeSuperLeague.com

==== Match results ====
August 23, 2025 1	Sporting JAX	1–3	DC Power FC	Jacksonville, Florida
9:50 PM ET	Pennock 7'	Report	Gourley 38', 68'; Fitch (yellow card) 61'; Bedoya 75'	Stadium: Hodges Stadium; Attendance: 9,783*; Referee: Jaclyn Metz
Note: Kickoff was originally scheduled for 7:00 PM ET, but was delayed multiple times due to thunderstorms. Amount of tickets sold was 9,783. Attendance affected by weather delays.

August 30, 2025 2	Tampa Bay Sun FC	2–3	Sporting JAX	Tampa, Florida
8:00 PM ET	Haugen (yellow card) 53'; Hendrix (yellow card) 60'; Gaillard 70'; Giammona 72'; Bessette (yellow card) 87'	Report	Hughes 50'; Puerta 63' (pen.), 67'	Stadium: Suncoast Credit Union Field; Attendance: 1,682; Referee: Rachel Swett

September 6, 2025 3	Sporting JAX	0–1	Dallas Trinity FC	Jacksonville, Florida
7:30 PM ET	Boman (yellow card) 40'	Report	Lancaster (yellow card) 14'; Moore 82'; Petrucelli (yellow card) 90+2'	Stadium: Hodges Stadium; Attendance: 2,314; Referee: Lauren Aldrich

September 13, 2025 4	Sporting JAX	2–2	Carolina Ascent FC	Jacksonville, Florida
7:30 PM ET	Puerta 11'; Hughes (yellow card) 27'; Kemp 39'	Report	Mercado 43'; Poole (yellow card) 48'; Walker 74'; Morris (yellow card) 89'	Stadium: Hodges Stadium; Attendance: 7,402; Referee: Danielle Chesky

September 28, 2025 5	Carolina Ascent FC	3–4	Sporting JAX	Charlotte, North Carolina
2:00 PM ET	Martinez (yellow card) 14'; Baisden 38'; Porter (yellow card) 45'; George 47', 66'; Nally (yellow card) 64'; Poole (yellow card) 80'	Report	Puerta 10', 23', 31'; Schmidt (yellow card) 36'; Kenton 50'; Pennock (yellow card) 57'	Stadium: American Legion Memorial Stadium; Attendance: 2,094; Referee: Iryna Petrunok

October 4, 2025 6	Brooklyn FC	3–3	Sporting JAX	Brooklyn, New York
6:00 PM ET	Breslin (yellow card) 18'; Cooke (yellow card) 45+3', (goal) 90'; Scarpelli 66', (yellow card) 67'; Rosette 86'; Daugherty (yellow card) 90+3'	Report	Boman 16'; Murray (yellow card) 18'; Kenton 76'; DeSmit 90+5'; Hughes (yellow card) 90+6'	Stadium: Maimonides Park; Attendance: 913; Referee: Marie Durr

October 14, 2025 7	DC Power FC	0–1	Sporting JAX	Washington, D.C.
7:00 PM ET		Report	Hughes (yellow card) 44'; Pennock 64'	Stadium: Audi Field; Attendance: 251; Referee: Alexandra Billeter

October 18, 2025 8	Sporting JAX	1–1	Tampa Bay Sun FC	Jacksonville, Florida
7:30 PM ET	Lester (yellow card) 51'; Sullivan (yellow card) 63'; Pennock (yellow card) 67'; Puerta 83'	Report	Nasello 18'	Stadium: Hodges Stadium; Attendance: 8,391; Referee: Jamie Padilla

October 31, 2025 9	Lexington SC	4–2	Sporting JAX	Lexington, Kentucky
6:00 PM ET	Griffith 17'; Ekić 51'; Barry 73'; Moyer 90'	Report	Kenton 79'; Puerta 90+6'	Stadium: Lexington SC Stadium; Attendance: 1,732; Referee: Elvis Osmanovic

November 8, 2025 10	Dallas Trinity FC	0–2	Sporting JAX	Dallas, Texas
5:00 PM ET	McCutcheon (red card); Wisner (yellow card) 82'	Report	Kenton 6'; Puerta 23', (penalty missed) 90+8'; Vaka (yellow card) 90+5'	Stadium: Cotton Bowl; Attendance: 1,983; Referee: Rodrigo Albuquerque

November 22, 2025 11	Sporting JAX	2–0	Fort Lauderdale United FC	Jacksonville, Florida
7:30 PM ET	Kenton 33'; Puerta 52'; Lester (yellow card) 74'; Pennock (yellow card) 80'	Report	Locklear (penalty missed) 90+4'	Stadium: Hodges Stadium; Attendance: 8,136; Referee: Elton Garcia

December 6, 2025 12	Tampa Bay Sun FC	0–3	Sporting JAX	Tampa, Florida
7:30 PM ET	Haugen (yellow card) 29'	Report	DeSmit 33'; Boman 38'; Murray (yellow card) 46'; Kenton 74'; Parks (yellow card) 89'	Stadium: Suncoast Credit Union Field; Attendance: 2,231; Referee: Calin Radosav

December 13, 2025 13	Sporting JAX	1–1	Fort Lauderdale United FC	Jacksonville, Florida
7:30 PM ET	Sullivan 89'	Report	Van Treeck 74'; Nabet (yellow card) 77'	Stadium: Hodges Stadium; Attendance: 7,834; Referee: Thomas Snyder

December 20, 2025 14	Sporting JAX	3–1	Tampa Bay Sun FC	Jacksonville, Florida
7:30 PM ET	Puerta 28'; Puerta (yellow card) 56'; Sullivan 63'; Fernández 89'	Report	Fusco 65'	Stadium: Hodges Stadium; Attendance: 8,272; Referee: Iryna Petrunok

January 31, 2026 15	Sporting JAX	1–0	Carolina Ascent FC	Jacksonville, Florida
5:00 PM ET	Lester (yellow card) 1'; Pennock 85'	Report	Porter (yellow card) 59'; Groom (yellow card) 72'	Stadium: Hodges Stadium; Attendance: 8,247; Referee: Deny Kulasinac

February 7, 2026 16	Sporting JAX	0–1	DC Power FC	Jacksonville, Florida
5:00 PM ET	Brown (yellow card) 55'; Boman (yellow card) 58'; Puerta (penalty missed) 82'	Report	Walker 78'	Stadium: Hodges Stadium; Attendance: 8,358; Referee: Alexandra Billeter

February 11, 2026 17	Sporting JAX	3–0	Spokane Zephyr FC	Jacksonville, Florida
7:00 PM ET	DeSmit 9'; Kenton 31'; Brown 39'	Report	Oyler (yellow card) 24'; Tappan (yellow card) 29'; Tucker (yellow card) 56'	Stadium: Hodges Stadium; Attendance: 8,377; Referee: Muhammad Hassan

February 21, 2026 18	Lexington SC	0–3	Sporting JAX	Lexington, Kentucky
2:00 PM ET	Bourgeois (yellow card) 52'; Griffith (yellow card) 71'; Aylmer (yellow card) 89'	Report	Smekrud 31'; DeSmit 45', 53'	Stadium: Lexington SC Stadium; Attendance: 1,707; Referee: Nabil Bensalah

March 14, 2026 19	Fort Lauderdale United FC	0–2	Sporting JAX	Davie, Florida
7:30 PM ET	Jennison (yellow card) 82'; Grosso 88'	Report	Smekrud (yellow card) 5'; Brown 21'; DeSmit 29'; Jones (yellow card) 43'	Stadium: Beyond Bancard Field; Attendance: 1,574; Referee: Laadi Issaka

March 22, 2026 20	Dallas Trinity FC	0–4	Sporting JAX	Dallas, Texas
5:00 PM ET	Swann (yellow card) 32'; Srainbrook (yellow card) 45+6'; Ubogagu (yellow card) 60'; Thackeray (yellow card) 77'; Davison (yellow card) 90'	Report	Brown (yellow card) 42'; DeSmit 45'; Kenton 45+2'; Boman 56'; Kenton (yellow card) 68'; Hughes 84'	Stadium: Cotton Bowl; Attendance: 3,741; Referee: Danielle Chesky

March 28, 2026 21	Sporting JAX	1–1	Spokane Zephyr FC	Jacksonville, Florida
7:30 PM ET	Boman 22'	Report	Knox 18'; Jaskaniec (yellow card) 64'; Thomas (yellow card) 72'	Stadium: Hodges Stadium; Attendance: 1,120; Referee: Jamie Padilla

April 4, 2026 22	Sporting JAX	2–0	Brooklyn FC	Jacksonville, Florida
7:30 PM ET	Kenton 17'; Lester (yellow card) 56'; Kenton (yellow card) 63'; Boman 69'	Report	Cudjoe (yellow card) 48'; Thompson (yellow card) 82'; Hill (yellow card) 90+3'	Stadium: Hodges Stadium; Attendance: 8,978; Referee: Lauren Aldrich

April 11, 2026 23	Fort Lauderdale United FC	1–4	Sporting JAX	Davie, Florida
4:00 PM ET	Gordon 56'; Locklear (yellow card) 69'	Report	DeSmit 15', 51'; Kenton 25'; Moyer 64' (o.g.)	Stadium: Beyond Bancard Field; Attendance: 1,641; Referee: Amin Hadzic

April 19, 2026 24	Spokane Zephyr FC	2–1	Sporting JAX	Spokane, Washington
7:00 PM ET	Zierenberg 12'; Rapp (yellow card) 24'; Jaskaniec (penalty missed) 68', 69'	Report	Boman 36'	Stadium: One Spokane Stadium; Attendance: 1,916; Referee: Kelsey Harms

April 25, 2026 25	Sporting JAX	1–2	Lexington SC	Jacksonville, Florida
7:30 PM ET	Illig (yellow card) 6'; Puerta 31' (pen.)	Report	McCain 19'; Pantuso (yellow card) 29'; Weinert 35'; Johnson (yellow card) 88'	Stadium: Hodges Stadium; Attendance: 8,744; Referee: Laura Rodriguez

May 3, 2026 26	Sporting JAX	2–1	Brooklyn FC	Jacksonville, Florida
5:00 PM ET	DeSmit 17' (pen.), 58'; Parks (red card) 68'; Balaam (yellow card) 71'	Report	Cudjoe (yellow card) 49'; Brown 67' (o.g.); Cooke (yellow card) 69'; Tengarrinha (yellow card) 69'	Stadium: Hodges Stadium; Attendance: 8,954; Referee: Kaitlyn Trowbridge

May 6, 2026 27	DC Power FC	0–1	Sporting JAX	Washington, D.C.
7:00 PM ET			DeSmit 33'	Stadium: Audi Field; Attendance: 1,013; Referee: John Matto

May 16, 2026 28	Carolina Ascent FC	3–1	Sporting JAX	Charlotte, North Carolina
7:00 PM ET	Groom 16'; Lussi 36'; Poole (yellow card) 56'; Aguilera 74'; Coleman (yellow card) 90+6'	Report	Boyan 7'; Boyan (yellow card) 24'	Stadium: American Legion Memorial Stadium; Attendance: 6,566; Referee: Marie Durr

=== Playoffs ===
May 24, 2026	Sporting JAX	0–1	Carolina Ascent	Jacksonville, Florida
5:00 PM ET	Hughes (yellow card) 90+2'	Report	George 6'; Corbin (yellow card) 45'	Stadium: Hodges Stadium; Attendance: 3,854; Referee: Matthew Thompson

== Statistics ==
=== Appearances ===
As of match played May 24, 2026

Players with no appearances are not included on the list

No.	Player	Nat.	Total		Regular Season		Playoffs	
No.	Player	Nat.	Apps	Starts	Apps	Starts	Apps	Starts
Goalkeepers
1	Jamie Gerstenberg	(Germany)	6	5	6	5	0	0
13	Kaitlyn Parks	(United States)	24	24	23	23	1	1
Defenders
5	Georgia Brown	(Scotland)	27	27	26	26	1	1
20	Julia Lester	(United States)	21	20	21	20	0	0
21	Maggie Illig	(United States)	13	8	12	7	1	1
23	Daviana Vaka	(Tonga)	8	2	8	2	0	0
24	Grace Phillpotts	(United States)	28	28	27	27	1	1
Midfielders
2	Parker Roberts	(United States)	9	2	8	2	1	0
3	Sophia Boman	(United States)	29	29	28	28	1	1
6	Jessie Hunt	(United States)	20	0	19	0	1	0
8	Sophie Jones	(United States)	29	29	28	28	1	1
9	Abby Boyan	(United States)	7	4	6	3	1	1
14	Sydney Schmidt	(United States)	2	1	2	1	0	0
19	Ashlyn Puerta	(United States)	28	27	27	26	1	1
33	Kacey Smekrud	(United States)	14	12	14	12	0	0
Forwards
4	Maddie Kemp	(United States)	10	5	10	5	0	0
7	Jade Pennock	(England)	26	9	25	9	1	0
10	Meg Hughes	(United States)	29	28	28	27	1	1
11	Andrea Fernández	(Spain)	18	0	18	0	0	0
12	Caroline Murray	(United States)	13	9	13	9	0	0
15	Katie Sullivan	(United States)	13	0	13	0	0	0
17	Baylee DeSmit	(United States)	25	21	24	20	1	1
27	Paige Kenton	(United States)	29	29	28	28	1	1

=== Goalscorers ===
Last updated May 24, 2026

Rank	No.	Nat.	Name	USLS	Playoffs	Total
1	17	(United States)	Baylee DeSmit	12	0	12
1	19	(United States)	Ashlyn Puerta	12	0	12
3	27	(United States)	Paige Kenton	10	0	10
4	3	(United States)	Sophia Boman	6	0	6
5	7	(England)	Jade Pennock	3	0	3
6	5	(Scotland)	Georgia Brown	2	0	2
6	10	(United States)	Meg Hughes	2	0	2
6	15	(United States)	Katie Sullivan	2	0	2
9	4	(United States)	Maddie Kemp	1	0	1
9	9	(United States)	Abby Boyan	1	0	1
9	11	(Spain)	Andrea Fernández	1	0	1
9	33	(United States)	Kacey Smekrud	1	0	1
Own goals				1	0	1
Total				54	0	54

=== Assists ===
Last updated May 24, 2026

Rank	No.	Nat.	Name	USLS	Playoffs	Total
1	3	(United States)	Sophia Boman	7	0	7
1	10	(United States)	Meg Hughes	7	0	7
1	19	(United States)	Ashlyn Puerta	7	0	7
1	27	(United States)	Paige Kenton	7	0	7
5	6	(United States)	Jessie Hunt	2	0	2
5	17	(United States)	Baylee DeSmit	2	0	2
5	20	(United States)	Julia Lester	2	0	2
8	7	(England)	Jade Pennock	1	0	1
8	8	(United States)	Sophie Jones	1	0	1
8	24	(United States)	Grace Phillpotts	1	0	1
8	33	(United States)	Kacey Smekrud	1	0	1
Total				38	0	38

=== Clean sheets ===
Last updated May 24, 2026

Rank	No.	Nat.	Name	USLS	Playoffs	Total
1	13	(United States)	Kaitlyn Parks	10	0	10
2	1	(Germany)	Jamie Gerstenberg	1	0	1
Total				11	0	11

=== Disciplinary record ===
Last updated May 24, 2026

Player			Regular Season			Playoffs			Total		
No.	Nat.	Name	Booked	(yellow card) (yellow-red card)	Sent off (straight red)	Booked	(yellow card) (yellow-red card)	Sent off (straight red)	Booked	(yellow card) (yellow-red card)	Sent off (straight red)
3	(United States)	Sophia Boman	2	0	0	0	0	0	2	0	0
5	(Scotland)	Georgia Brown	2	0	0	0	0	0	2	0	0
7	(England)	Jade Pennock	3	0	0	0	0	0	3	0	0
8	(United States)	Sophie Jones	1	0	0	0	0	0	1	0	0
10	(United States)	Meg Hughes	5	0	0	1	0	0	6	0	0
12	(United States)	Caroline Murray	2	0	0	0	0	0	2	0	0
13	(United States)	Kaitlyn Parks	2	0	1	0	0	0	2	0	1
14	(United States)	Sydney Schmidt	1	0	0	0	0	0	1	0	0
15	(United States)	Katie Sullivan	1	0	0	0	0	0	1	0	0
19	(United States)	Ashlyn Puerta	1	0	0	0	0	0	1	0	0
20	(United States)	Julia Lester	5	0	0	0	0	0	5	0	0
21	(United States)	Maggie Illig	1	0	0	0	0	0	1	0	0
23	(Tonga)	Daviana Vaka	1	0	0	0	0	0	1	0	0
27	(United States)	Paige Kenton	1	0	0	0	0	0	1	0	0
33	(United States)	Kacey Smekrud	1	0	0	0	0	0	1	0	0
MGR	(England)	Stacey Balaam	1	0	0	0	0	0	1	0	0
Total			30	0	1	1	0	0	31	0	1

== Awards and honors ==
=== USL Super League Player of the Year ===
Player	Position	Stat	Ref
(United States) Ashlyn Puerta	MF	27 matches, 12 goals, 7 assists	

=== USL Super League Young Player of the Year ===
Player	Position	Stat	Ref
(United States) Ashlyn Puerta	MF	27 matches, 12 goals, 7 assists	

=== USL Super League Golden Playmaker ===
Player	Position	Stat	Ref
(United States) Ashlyn Puerta	MF	7 assists	

=== USL Super League All-League First Team ===
Player	Position	Ref
(United States) Ashlyn Puerta	MF	
(United States) Paige Kenton	FW	

=== USL Super League All-League Second Team ===
Player	Position	Ref
(United States) Kaitlyn Parks	GK	
(Scotland) Georgia Brown	DF	
(United States) Sophie Jones	MF	
(United States) Baylee DeSmit	FW	

=== USL Super League Player of the Month ===
Month	Player	Position	Ref
September†	(United States) Ashlyn Puerta	FW	
November	(United States) Paige Kenton	FW	
February‡	(United States) Kaitlyn Parks	GK	

† Combined statistics for August and September
‡ Combined statistics for January and February

=== USL Super League Team of the Month ===
Italics indicate a loaned in player

Month	Player	Position	Ref
September	(United States) Ashlyn Puerta	FW	
September	(United States) Julia Lester	Bench	
October	(United States) Ashlyn Puerta (2)	MF	
October	(Scotland) Georgia Brown	Bench	
October	(United States) Paige Kenton	Bench	
November	(United States) Kaitlyn Parks	GK	
November	(Scotland) Georgia Brown (2)	DF	
November	(United States) Paige Kenton (2)	FW	
December	(Scotland) Georgia Brown (3)	DF	
December	(United States) Sophia Boman	MF	
December	(United States) Paige Kenton (3)	FW	
February	(United States) Kaitlyn Parks (2)	GK	
February	(Scotland) Georgia Brown (4)	DF	
February	(United States) Ashlyn Puerta (3)	MF	
February	(United States) Baylee DeSmit	Bench	
March	(United States) Maggie Illig	DF	
March	(United States) Sophia Boman (2)	MF	
March	(United States) Kaitlyn Parks (3)	Bench	
April	(United States) Grace Phillpotts	DF	
April	(United States) Sophia Boman (3)	MF	
April	(United States) Baylee DeSmit (2)	Bench	

=== USL Super League Coach of the Year ===
Year	Coach	Record	Ref
2025–26	(England) Stacey Balaam	16–7–5 (.661)	

=== USL Super League Coach of the Month ===
Month	Coach	Ref
December	(England) Stacey Balaam	
February	(England) Stacey Balaam	

=== USL Super League Save of the Month ===
Month	Player	Ref
October	(United States) Kaitlyn Parks	
