= Maggie Illig =

American soccer player (born 2004)

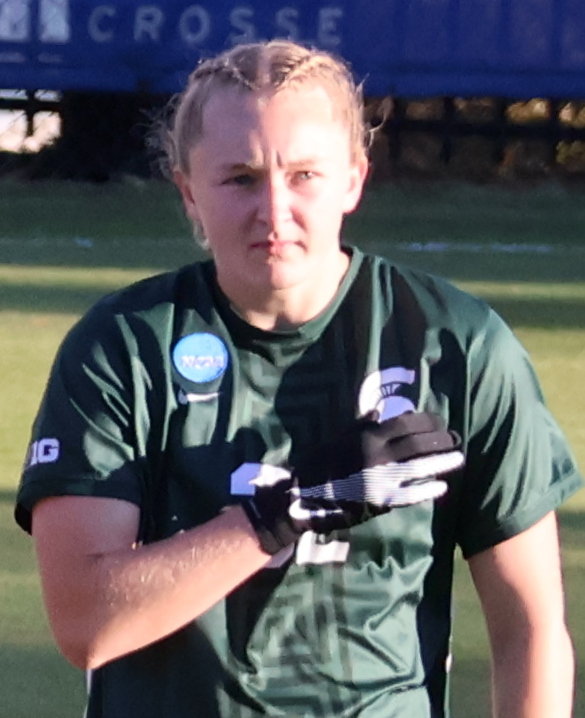
- Illig with Michigan State in 2024

Personal information
- Full name: Maggie Mae Illig
- Date of birth: March 1, 2004 (age 22)
- Height: 5 ft 7 in (1.70 m)
- Position: Defender

Team information
- Current team: Sporting JAX
- Number: 32

Youth career
- Sporting St. Louis
- 2018–2021: Troy Buchanan Trojans

College career
Years	Team	Apps	(Gls)
2022–2025	Michigan State Spartans	81	(6)

Senior career*
Years	Team	Apps	(Gls)
2026–	Sporting JAX	22	(1)
- * Club domestic league appearances and goals as of November 15, 2026

Maggie Mae Illig (born March 1, 2004) is an American professional soccer player who plays as a defender for USL Super League club Sporting JAX. She played college soccer for the Michigan State Spartans, earning third-team All-American honors in 2025.

== Early life ==
Illig grew up in Troy, Missouri, the youngest of four children born to Tamara and Ned Illig. She attended Troy Buchanan High School, where she was named all-state after scoring 23 goals with 10 assists in her senior year. She also played four years of varsity basketball in high school. She played GA club soccer for Sporting St. Louis, where she won four consecutive Missouri State Cup titles. She originally committed to play college soccer for the NCAA Division II–level Grand Valley State Lakers, but after their head coach Jeff Hosler moved to the Michigan State Spartans, she re-committed to play for him there in the NCAA Division I.

== College career ==
Illig played in 15 games primarily as a substitute and scored 1 goal for the Michigan State Spartans as a freshman in 2022. She helped the Spartans win the Big Ten Conference regular-season title and reach the Big Ten tournament final. Having been recruited as a forward, she moved to center back as a sophomore in 2023, becoming a starter in the new position. She tripled her minutes played in 19 games and scored 1 goal that season as the Spartans defended their conference title and reached the NCAA tournament third round for the first time.

Illig played in 22 games and scored 1 goal with 2 assists in her junior year in 2024, earning second-team All-Big Ten honors. She led the team in field minutes played as they again made the NCAA tournament third round. In her senior year in 2025, she started all 25 games and scored 3 goals as she led the Spartans to runner-up finishes for the Big Ten regular-season and tournament titles. The team earned a program best two seed in the NCAA tournament and reached the quarterfinals for the first time. Illig was named first-team All-Big Ten and third-team All-American as the heart of the Spartans defense.

== Club career ==
On January 28, 2026, Illig signed her first professional contract with USL Super League club Sporting JAX, reuniting with former Spartans teammates Kaitlyn Parks and Meg Hughes. She made her professional debut three days later as a second-half substitute for Kacey Smekrud in a 1–0 win over the Carolina Ascent.

On April 8, 2026, the USL Super League announced Illig had been named to their USL Super League Team of the Month as a defender for contributions made during March 2026.

== Career statistics ==
=== College ===
As of match played November 28, 2025

Season	Games		Scoring				
Season	GP	GS	G	A	PTS	SH	SOG
Michigan State Spartans
2022	15	3	1	1	3	8	5
2023	19	17	1	1	3	11	3
2024	22	21	1	2	4	13	5
2025	25	25	3	1	7	17	10
Career
Career total	81	66	6	5	17	49	23

=== Professional ===
As of match played November 15, 2026

Club	Season	League			Cup		Playoffs		Total	
Club	Season	Division	Apps	Goals	Apps	Goals	Apps	Goals	Apps	Goals
Sporting JAX	2025–26	(United States) USLS	12	0	—		1	0	13	0
Sporting JAX	2026	(United States) USLS	10	1	—		—		10	1
Career total			22	1	—		1	0	23	1

== Honors and awards ==
USL Super League

- Team of the Month: March 2026

Michigan State Spartans

- Big Ten Conference: 2022, 2023

Individual

- Third-team All-American: 2025
- First-team All-Big Ten: 2025
- Second-team All-Big Ten: 2024
