= Shawn Occeus =

American basketball player

Free agent
- Position: Shooting guard

Personal information
- Born: December 15, 1997 (age 28) Boca Raton, Florida
- Listed height: 6 ft 4 in (1.93 m)
- Listed weight: 210 lb (95 kg)

Career information
- High school: Park Vista (Lake Worth, Florida); Grandview Prep (Boca Raton, Florida)
- College: Northeastern (2016–2019)
- NBA draft: 2019: undrafted
- Playing career: 2019–present

Career history
- 2019–2021: Rio Grande Valley Vipers
- 2021–2022: Phoenix Hagen
- 2022: Niagara River Lions
- 2022–2023: Rio Grande Valley Vipers
- 2023: Niagara River Lions
- 2023–2024: Rio Grande Valley Vipers

Career highlights
- CAA Defensive Player of the Year (2018)

Shawn Occeus (born December 15, 1997) is an American professional basketball player who last played for the Rio Grande Valley Vipers of the NBA G League. He played college basketball for the Northeastern Huskies.

== Early life ==
Occeus was born on December 15, 1997, in Boca Raton, Florida.

Occeus went to high school at Park Vista Community High School for two years. He transferred to Grandview Preparatory High School in Boca Raton, Florida, where he played basketball between 2014–15 and 2015–16. During his junior year he averaged 13.5 points, 5.2 rebounds, 3.5 assists, and 1.5 steals per game. On February 23, 2016, Occeus was named PBgametime boys player of the week after averaging 24.5 points and 12.5 rebounds per game in two regional playoff wins. During his senior year he averaged 19.5 points, 9.4 rebounds, 4.5 assists and 1.2 steals per game. Occeus earned Florida Association of Basketball Coaches 2A Player of the Year honors as well as leading Grandview to the state championship.

== College career ==
Occeus averaged 5.4 points and 1.9 rebounds during his freshman year, playing all 31 games and starting in 27 of them. On February 22, 2018, he scored a career-high 24 points and had four three-pointers in an 80–75 win against Towson. During his sophomore year Occeus was the Huskies second leading scorer, averaging 10.8 points, 2.5 rebounds and 1.8 assists per game. He was named CAA Defensive Player of the Year. Occeus struggles with injuries as a junior, missing every game until his season debut on December 8, 2018, and then from February 2, 2019, versus Hofstra until the conference tournament. In his final season at Northeastern, Occeus averaged 9.9 points, 2.7 rebounds and 1.9 assists per game. He led the Huskies into the NCAA tournament, where they were defeated by the Kansas Jayhawks. Following the season, Occeus initially announced that he was transferring before ultimately turning professional.

== Professional career ==
=== Rio Grande Valley Vipers (2019–2021) ===
Occeus was selected by the Salt Lake City Stars with the seventh pick in the second round of the 2019 NBA G League draft. On November 6, 2019, his contract was put on waivers. On December 26, 2019, the Rio Grande Valley Vipers claimed him from the player pool, but on January 21, 2020, his contract was put back on waivers, only to be added to the Vipers roster 2 days later. Occeus averaged 2.5 points and 1.3 rebounds throughout the 2019–20 season. During the 2020–21 season, he averaged 6.4 points, 1.7 assists, and 1.1 steals per game.

=== Phoenix Hagen (2021–2022) ===
On June 18, 2021, Occeus signed with Phoenix Hagen of the German ProA.

On December 1, 2022, Occeus was acquired by the Cleveland Charge, but was waived six days later, before appearing in a game for them.

=== Niagara River Lions (2022) ===
On July 6, 2022, Occeus signed with the Niagara River Lions of the Canadian Elite Basketball League, making his debut the next day.

=== Return to Rio Grande Valley (2022–2023) ===
On December 25, 2022, Occeus was reacquired by the Rio Grande Valley Vipers.

=== Return to Niagara (2023) ===
On July 16, 2023, Occeus re-signed with the Niagara River Lions.

=== Third stint with the Vipers (2023–2024) ===
On October 30, 2023, Occeus rejoined the Rio Grande Valley Vipers.

== Career statistics ==
=== College ===
Year	Team	GP	GS	MPG	FG%	3P%	FT%	RPG	APG	SPG	BPG	PPG
2016–17	Northeastern	31	27	21.1	.409	.376	.526	1.9	.9	.8	.2	5.4
2017–18	Northeastern	33	28	28.9	.457	.343	.787	2.5	1.8	1.9	.5	10.8
2018–19	Northeastern	15	7	26.5	.392	.319	.605	2.7	1.9	1.3	.6	9.9
Career		79	62	25.4	.429	.347	.685	2.3	1.5	1.4	.4	8.5

=== NBA G League ===
Year	Team	GP	GS	MPG	FG%	3P%	FT%	RPG	APG	SPG	BPG	PPG
2019–20	Rio Grande	18	2	9.9	.429	.261	.286	1.3	.9	.4	.2	2.5
2020–21	Rio Grande	15	14	25.7	.351	.283	.636	3.5	1.7	1.1	.3	6.4
Career		33	16	17.1	.375	.277	.500	2.3	1.3	.7	.2	4.3
