= A. T. Perry =

American football player (born 1999)

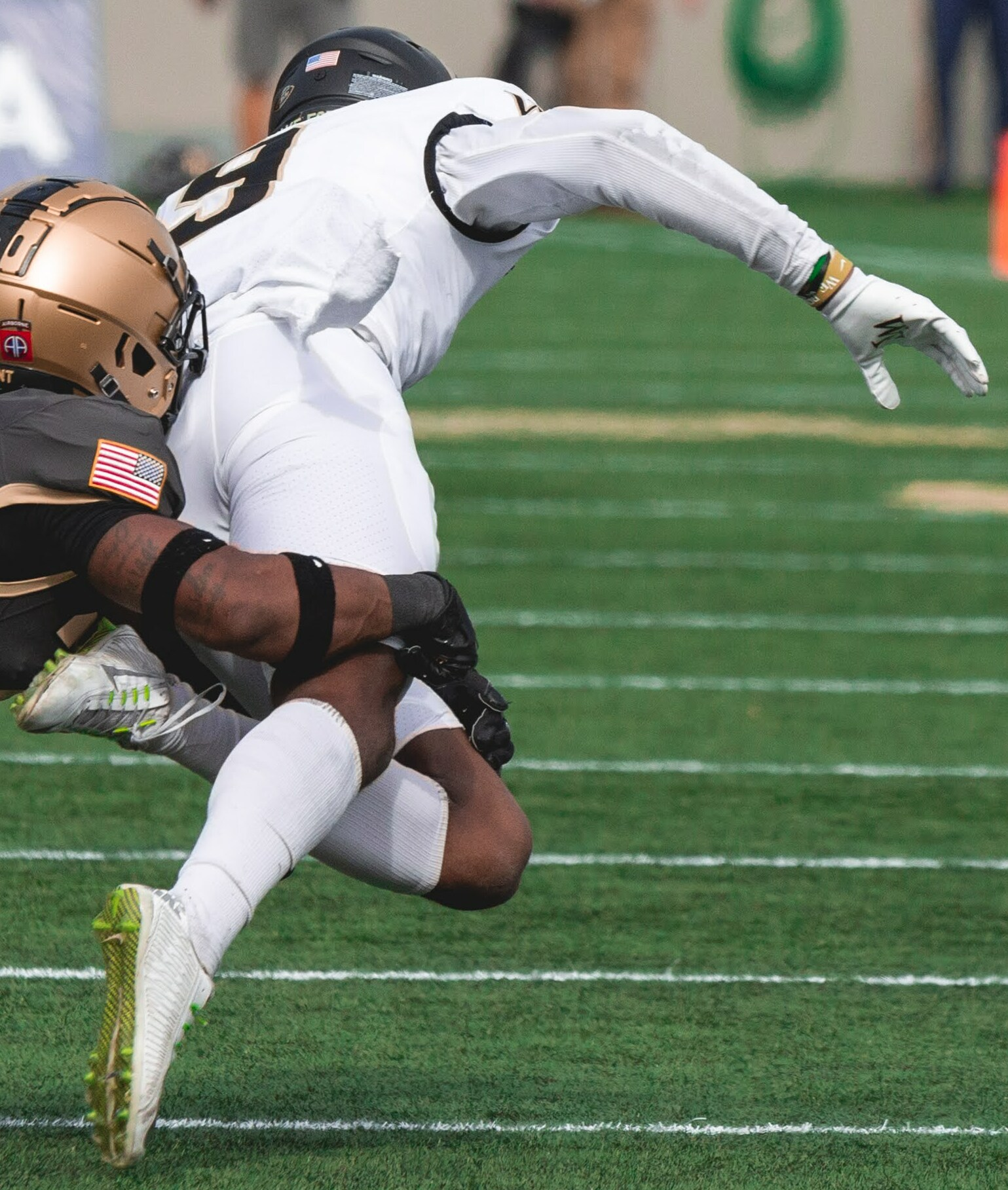
- Perry with the Wake Forest Demon Deacons in 2021

Rhode Island Breakers
- Position: Wide receiver
- Roster status: Unsigned draft pick

Personal information
- Born: October 26, 1999 (age 27); Lake Worth Beach, Florida, U.S.
- Listed height: 6 ft 5 in (1.96 m)
- Listed weight: 207 lb (94 kg)

Career information
- High school: Park Vista Community (Lake Worth Beach)
- College: Wake Forest (2018–2022)
- NFL draft: 2023: 6th round, 195th overall pick

Career history
- New Orleans Saints (2023–2024); Denver Broncos (2024–2025)*; Pittsburgh Steelers (2026)*; Rhode Island Breakers (2027-present)
- * Offseason or practice squad member only

Awards and highlights
- 2× First-team All-ACC (2021, 2022)

Career NFL statistics as of 2024
- Receptions: 12
- Receiving yards: 246
- Receiving touchdowns: 4
- Stats at Pro Football Reference

Atorian "A. T." Perry (born October 26, 1999) is an American professional football wide receiver. He played college football for the Wake Forest Demon Deacons and was drafted by the New Orleans Saints in the sixth round of the 2023 NFL draft.

== Early life ==
Perry attended Park Vista Community High School in Lake Worth Beach, Florida, which is his hometown. He committed to play college football at Wake Forest University.

== College career ==
After redshirting as a freshman at Wake Forest in 2018, Perry played in nine games in 2019 and had four receptions for 62 yards and a touchdown. In 2020, he had 15 receptions for 211 yards and a touchdown over six games. Perry was named first team All-Atlantic Coast Conference in 2021 after recording 71 receptions for 1,293 yards and a school record 15 touchdowns.

== Professional career ==
Pre-draft measurables
| Height | Weight | Arm length | Hand span | Wingspan | 40-yard dash | 10-yard split | 20-yard split | 20-yard shuttle | Three-cone drill | Vertical jump | Broad jump |
|---|---|---|---|---|---|---|---|---|---|---|---|
| 6 ft 3 1/2 in (1.92 m) | 198 lb (90 kg) | 33 1/4 in (0.84 m) | 9 1/4 in (0.23 m) | 6 ft 9 5/8 in (2.07 m) | 4.47 s | 1.59 s | 2.53 s | 4.32 s | 6.81 s | 35.0 in (0.89 m) | 11 ft 1 in (3.38 m) |
All values from NFL Combine/Pro Day

=== New Orleans Saints ===
Perry was selected by the New Orleans Saints in the sixth round, 195th overall, of the 2023 NFL draft. He caught his first career touchdown reception against the Minnesota Vikings in a 27–19 loss. In Week 18 against the Atlanta Falcons, he scored two touchdowns. As a rookie, he appeared in ten games and made three starts. He had 12 receptions for 246 yards and four touchdowns.

Perry was waived by the Saints on October 4, 2024.

=== Denver Broncos ===
On October 8, 2024, Perry was signed to the Denver Broncos' practice squad. He signed a reserve/future contract with Denver on January 13, 2025.

On July 20, 2025, it was announced that Perry would begin training camp on the active/PUP list. On August 26, Perry was waived by the Broncos. The next day, he was re-signed to the practice squad.

=== Pittsburgh Steelers ===
On January 29, 2026, Perry signed a reserve/futures contract with the Pittsburgh Steelers. He was waived by the Steelers on August 7.

=== Rhode Island Breakers ===
On November 19, 2026, Perry was drafted by the Rhode Island Breakers in the 2027 UFL Draft.

== Career statistics ==
=== NFL ===
| Year | Team | Games | | Receiving | | | | | Fumbles | |
| Year | Team | GP | GS | Rec | Yds | Avg | Lng | TD | Fum | Lost |
|---|---|---|---|---|---|---|---|---|---|---|
| 2023 | NO | 10 | 3 | 12 | 246 | 20.5 | 44 | 4 | 0 | 0 |
| Career | | 10 | 3 | 12 | 246 | 20.5 | 44 | 4 | 0 | 0 |

=== College ===
| Year | Team | GP | Receiving | | | |
| Year | Team | GP | Rec | Yds | Avg | TD |
|---|---|---|---|---|---|---|
| 2018 | Wake Forest | 0 | Did not play | | | |
| 2019 | Wake Forest | 9 | 4 | 62 | 15.5 | 1 |
| 2020 | Wake Forest | 7 | 15 | 211 | 14.1 | 1 |
| 2021 | Wake Forest | 14 | 71 | 1,293 | 18.2 | 15 |
| 2022 | Wake Forest | 13 | 81 | 1,096 | 13.5 | 11 |
| Career | | 43 | 171 | 2,662 | 15.6 | 28 |
