= Paige Kenton =

American soccer player

Personal information
- Full name: Paige Storm Kenton
- Date of birth: April 2, 2002 (age 24)
- Height: 5 ft 10 in (1.78 m)
- Positions: Forward; defender

Team information
- Current team: Sporting JAX
- Number: 27

Youth career
- 2016–2019: Padua Academy

College career
Years	Team	Apps	(Gls)
2020–2023	Penn Quakers	37	(3)
2024	Delaware Fightin' Blue Hens	19	(2)

Senior career*
Years	Team	Apps	(Gls)
2021–2023	South Jersey Elite Barons FC		(10)
2025–	Sporting JAX	34	(11)
- * Club domestic league appearances and goals as of October 16, 2026

Paige Storm Kenton (born April 2, 2002) is an American professional soccer player who plays as a forward or defender for USL Super League club Sporting JAX. She played college soccer for the Penn Quakers and the Delaware Fightin' Blue Hens.

== Early life ==
Kenton grew up in Wilmington, Delaware, and attended Padua Academy, where she was a multi-sport athlete in soccer, basketball, and track and field. She helped Padua win state championships in 2018 and 2019, and was named the Gatorade Delaware Girls’ Soccer Player of the Year as a senior. She also earned All-State and regional All-American honors from United Soccer Coaches. Kenton graduated as an AP Scholar with Distinction, and was a National Merit Commended Scholar and a candidate for the U.S. Presidential Scholars.

== College career ==
Kenton played four seasons at the University of Pennsylvania, appearing in 37 matches with three goals and two assists. She graduated magna cum laude with a degree in neuroscience. During this time, she also competed for South Jersey Elite Barons FC in the Women's Premier Soccer League.

In 2024, Kenton transferred to the University of Delaware for her final NCAA season, starting all 19 matches, playing over 1,500 minutes, and scoring two goals—including one against her former team, Penn.

== Club career ==
Kenton signed with Sporting JAX of the USL Super League in June 2025 ahead of the club’s inaugural season. On September 28, 2025, she scored her first professional goal in a 4–3 victory over Carolina Ascent FC. Teammate Jessie Hunt gave Kenton the nickname ‘Trish.’ The name evolved from Paige to Patty to Patricia, before finally becoming Trish. At the end of October, Kenton was named to the USL Super League Team of the Month as a bench player. The following month, she was named USL Super League Player of the Month after recording two goals and one assist on six shots during the month. Kenton continued to contribute offensively, scoring more goals by mid-season than she had during her entire collegiate career; By that point in the campaign, she had recorded six goals and five assists, despite being listed primarily as a defender. In December 2025, she received her second all-league team of the month honor.

== Personal life ==
Kenton's middle name, Storm, is inspired by the X-Men heroine. She has two sisters, whose middle names—Seven and Ripley—were inspired by fictional characters: Seven of Nine from the Star Trek franchise and Ellen Ripley from the Alien franchise, respectively. She has three dogs—King, a German Shepherd; Molly, a Great Dane–Boxer mix; and Apollo, a Catahoula Leopard Dog—who live at home with her family. In a local interview, she stated that she sleeps with pillows designed to resemble them. She is a pescetarian.

== Career statistics ==
=== College ===
Season	Games		Scoring				
Season	GP	GS	G	A	PTS	SH	SOG
Penn Quakers
2021	8	1	2	1	5	7	6
2022	15	14	0	0	0	14	7
2023	14	14	1	1	3	8	2
Delaware Fightin' Blue Hens
2024	19	19	2	0	4	37	11
Career
Career total	56	48	5	2	12	66	26

=== Club ===
As of match played October 16, 2026

Club	Season	League			Cup		Playoffs		Total	
Club	Season	Division	Apps	Goals	Apps	Goals	Apps	Goals	Apps	Goals
Sporting JAX	2025–26	USL Super League	28	10	—		1	0	29	10
Sporting JAX	2026	USL Super League	10	3	—		—		10	3
Career total			38	13	—		1	0	39	13

== Honors and awards ==
Individual

- USL Super League All-League First Team: 2025–26
- USL Super League Player of the Month: November 2025
- USL Super League Team of the Month: October 2025, November 2025, December 2025, October 2026
- Gatorade Delaware Girls' Soccer Player of the Year: 2019
