= Abby Boyan =

American soccer player (born 1999)

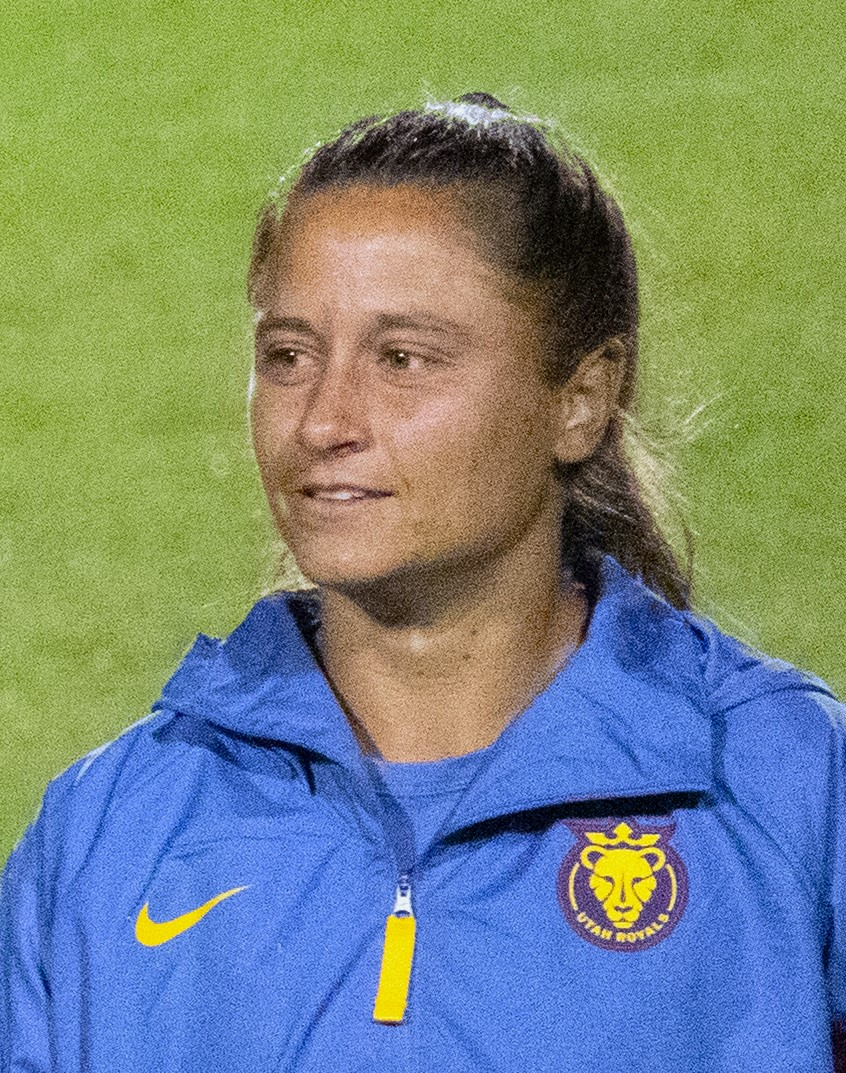
- Boyan with the Utah Royals in 2025

Personal information
- Full name: Abigail Patricia Boyan
- Date of birth: August 24, 1999 (age 27)
- Place of birth: Spring Lake, New Jersey, U.S.
- Positions: Midfielder; wingback

Team information
- Current team: DC Power FC
- Number: 8

College career
Years	Team	Apps	(Gls)
2018–2022	Georgia Bulldogs	93	(17)

Senior career*
Years	Team	Apps	(Gls)
2024	AaB	14	(2)
2024–2025	Fylkir	19	(2)
2025	Utah Royals	0	(0)
2026	Sporting JAX	6	(1)
2026–	DC Power FC	1	(0)
- * Club domestic league appearances and goals as of August 15, 2026

Abigail Patricia Boyan (born August 24, 1999) is an American professional soccer player who plays as a midfielder or wingback for USL Super League club DC Power FC. She played college soccer for the Georgia Bulldogs before starting her professional career with European clubs AaB and Fylkir. She has also previously played for the Utah Royals of the National Women's Soccer League and Sporting JAX of the USLS.

== Early life ==
Born in Spring Lake, New Jersey, to Tom and Leann Boyan, she attended Ranney School from kindergarten through her senior year of high school. At Ranney, she set the school record for goals scored and finished with over 100 goals in her high school career. During her senior year, Boyan accepted a scholarship to play college soccer at the University of Georgia.

== College career ==
She played for five years for the Bulldogs from 2018 to 2022, scoring 17 goals from 93 games. In her final year, Boyan led Georgia to its first NCAA Women's Soccer Tournament in eight years. Boyan was named an All-American in 2022, First Team All-SEC in both 2022 and 2020, and Second Team All-SEC in 2021.

== Club career ==
After playing for amateur side Asheville City SC, Boyan signed with AaB in the A-Liga, the top division in Denmark before the 2024 season.

In late 2024, she joined Fylkir in Iceland. Boyan contributed at least two goals for Fylkir during the season, including in a 4–1 victory over Tindastóll where she scored before halftime, helping the club secure points in a tight relegation battle.

On August 13, 2025, The Utah Royals of the NWSL brought Boyan in on a relief contract and subsequently signed her fully through the year on September 4. After her contract expired at the end of the year, Boyan returned to the Royals in the 2026 preseason as a non-roster invitee.

Boyan joined USL Super League expansion club Sporting JAX as a midseason addition on February 18, 2026. She spent four months in Jacksonville and scored once, a goal against the Carolina Ascent in JAX's regular season finale.

In August 2026, Boyan signed a contract with DC Power FC. She made her club debut on August 15, earning the start in DC Power's season-opening loss to the Carolina Ascent.

== Career statistics ==
=== Club ===
As of June 10, 2026

Club	Season	Division	League		Cup		Playoffs		Total	
Club	Season	Division	Apps	Goals	Apps	Goals	Apps	Goals	Apps	Goals
AaB	2023–24	A-Liga	14	2	—		—		14	2
Fylkir	2024	1. deild kvenna	19	2	1	0	—		20	2
Utah Royals	2025	NWSL	0	0	—		—		0	0
Sporting JAX	2025–2026	USL Super League	6	1	—		1	0	7	1
Career total			39	5	1	0	1	0	41	5
