= Katie Sullivan (soccer) =

American football player (born 2002)

Personal information
- Full name: Katherine Sullivan
- Date of birth: December 27, 2002 (age 23)
- Height: 5 ft 7 in (1.70 m)
- Position: Forward

Youth career
- NJ Rush Grey

College career
| Years | Team | Apps | (Gls) |
| 2021–2024 | Johns Hopkins Blue Jays | 88 | (60) |

Senior career*
| Years | Team | Apps | (Gls) |
| 2025 | Athlone Town | 9 | (3) |
| 2025–2026 | Sporting JAX | 13 | (2) |
- * Club domestic league appearances and goals as of May 24, 2026

Katherine Sullivan (born December 27, 2002) is an American professional soccer player who plays as a forward. She played college soccer for the Johns Hopkins Blue Jays before starting her professional career with Irish club Athlone Town and USL Super League club Sporting JAX.

== Early life ==
Sullivan grew up in Yardley, Pennsylvania, and played high school soccer at Villa Joseph Marie High School under head coach Richard Finneyfrock. She helped lead the team to one state championship and four district championships, finishing her prep career with 56 goals and 44 assists. At the club level, she played for NJ Rush Grey, winning the US Youth Soccer New Jersey State Cup. She also volunteered with Special Stars, a program supporting children with special needs in sports.

== College career ==
Sullivan attended Johns Hopkins University, where she played four seasons (2021–2024) for the Blue Jays women’s soccer team. As a sophomore in 2022, she emerged as the team’s central playmaker, earning regional recognition for her composure and attacking instincts. That season, she helped lead Johns Hopkins to its first-ever NCAA Division III National Championship, scoring the game-winning goal in the final against Case Western Reserve and contributing multiple goals and assists throughout the tournament.

Over her collegiate career, Sullivan scored 60 goals and recorded 31 assists, ranking second in program history in both categories and totaling 151 points. She also played a key role in helping Johns Hopkins set a program record for most goals in a single season. Her outstanding performances earned her numerous conference and national honors, including selections to the USC All-America teams.

In 2024, Sullivan was named the NCAA Division III nominee for the Honda Athlete of the Year in soccer, part of the prestigious Honda Sports Award program recognizing the top NCAA Division III women’s soccer player nationwide. In December 2024, she was further honored as the NCAA Division III National Player of the Year by Philadelphia Soccer Now, recognizing her goal-scoring exploits, All-American accolades, and leadership during Johns Hopkins’ record-setting season.

== Club career ==
Sullivan signed with Athlone Town of the League of Ireland Women's Premier Division on February 22, 2025. She contributed three goals and three assists for the club.

On June 18, 2025, Sullivan signed with USL Super League expansion club Sporting JAX. She scored her first two Super League goals in December 2025, netting in back-to-back games. After one season, Sullivan departed from Sporting JAX in June 2026.

== Personal life ==
Sullivan majored in economics. In addition to soccer, she briefly competed on Johns Hopkins' track and field team during her freshman year. Her aunt lives in Amelia Island, Florida, 33 miles north of Jacksonville.

== Career statistics ==
=== College ===
| Season | Games | | Scoring | | | | |
| Season | GP | GS | G | A | PTS | SH | SOG |
Johns Hopkins Blue Jays
| 2021 | 20 | 19 | 10 | 5 | 25 | 67 | 29 |
| 2022 | 23 | 22 | 16 | 13 | 45 | 82 | 43 |
| 2023 | 21 | 21 | 15 | 5 | 35 | 103 | 43 |
| 2024 | 24 | 24 | 19 | 8 | 46 | 110 | 51 |
Career
| Career total | 88 | 86 | 60 | 31 | 151 | 362 | 166 |

=== Club ===
As of match played May 24, 2026

| Club | Season | League | | | Cup | | Playoffs | | Total | |
| Club | Season | Division | Apps | Goals | Apps | Goals | Apps | Goals | Apps | Goals |
|---|---|---|---|---|---|---|---|---|---|---|
| Athlone Town | 2025 | League of Ireland Women's Premier Division | 7 | 3 | 2 | 0 | 0 | 0 | 9 | 3 |
| Sporting JAX | 2025–26 | USL Super League | 13 | 2 | — | | 0 | 0 | 13 | 2 |
| Career total | | | 20 | 5 | 2 | 0 | 0 | 0 | 22 | 5 |

== Honors ==
Team

- NCAA Division III National Champion: 2022
- Centennial Conference Champion: multiple seasons

Individual – Athletic

- United Soccer Coaches (USC) First Team All-American: 2021, 2023
- USC Second Team All-American: 2022
- USC First Team All-Region V: 2021, 2022, 2023
- Centennial Conference Offensive Player of the Year: 2023
- First Team All-Centennial Conference: 2021, 2022, 2023
- DIII Honda Athlete of the Year finalist: 2024
