= Daviana Vaka =

Tongan footballer (born 2001)

Personal information
- Full name: Daviana Cheyenne Vaka
- Date of birth: August 11, 2001 (age 25)
- Height: 5 ft 7 in (1.70 m)
- Position: Defender

Youth career
- –2019: Utah Avalanche

College career
Years	Team	Apps	(Gls)
2019–2022	BYU Cougars	47	(0)
2023–2024	Florida Gators	33	(0)

Senior career*
Years	Team	Apps	(Gls)
2025	Fort Lauderdale United	0	(0)
2025–2026	Sporting JAX	8	(0)

International career^{‡}
2018–	Tonga	6	(1)
- * Club domestic league appearances and goals as of December 1, 2025 ‡ National team caps and goals as of July 2025

Daviana Cheyenne Vaka (born August 11, 2001) is a Tongan-American professional soccer player who plays as a defender. Born in the United States, she plays for the Tonga national team. Vaka played college soccer for the BYU Cougars and Florida Gators.

== Early life ==
Vaka was raised in Sandy, Utah, and is the youngest of eight children. She attended Juan Diego Catholic High School, where she led her team to a Utah 3A state championship in 2016 and was named State Player of the Year. She also played club soccer with Utah Avalanche in the ECNL.

== College career ==
=== BYU Cougars ===
Vaka began her collegiate career at Brigham Young University, initially playing as a forward before transitioning into a defender. She made 47 appearances over four seasons, starting consistently from her sophomore year onward. She was named West Coast Conference (WCC) Defensive Player of the Week in October 2022.

=== Florida Gators ===
In 2023, Vaka transferred to the University of Florida as a graduate student, joining the Florida Gators. She started all 33 matches across two seasons and logged 2,766 total minutes. Her performance in 2023 earned her All-Southeastern Conference (SEC) First Team honors, SEC Defensive Player of the Week, United Soccer Coaches (USC) All-Southeast Region Second Team, and Florida's Defensive Player of the Year award. She completed a master’s degree in Sport Management in December 2024.

== Club career ==
Vaka signed her first professional contract with Fort Lauderdale United FC of the USL Super League in May 2025. She became the second Tongan woman to sign a professional contract, following her twin sister, Laveni.

On July 1, 2025, Vaka signed with Sporting JAX, commonly known as Sporting JAX, an expansion franchise in the USL Super League.

== International career ==
Vaka represents Tonga internationally and made her debut during the 2018 OFC Women's Nations Cup qualifiers in New Caledonia. She returned to the team in 2022 for the OFC Women's Nations Cup in Fiji, where she scored a goal and helped Tonga reach the quarter-finals.

During the Oceania Football Confederation 2027 FIFA Women's World Cup qualifiers, Vaka was named captain for Tonga. The team lost 3–0 to American Samoa, but won 4–1 over Tahiti.

== Personal life ==
Daviana’s twin sister, Laveni Vaka, is also a professional footballer who plays for Fort Lauderdale United FC. The sisters are of Tongan descent and have been recognized for their contributions to the development of women’s football in Tonga. She is engaged to Utah State Aggies quarterback Jacob Conover.

== Career statistics ==
=== Club ===
As of match played May 24, 2026

Club	Season	League			Cup		Playoffs		Total	
Club	Season	Division	Apps	Goals	Apps	Goals	Apps	Goals	Apps	Goals
Fort Lauderdale United	2024–25	USL Super League	0	0	0	0	0	0	0	0
Sporting JAX	2025–26	USL Super League	8	0	—		0	0	8	0
Career total			8	0	0	0	0	0	8	0

== Honors ==
- SEC Defensive Player of the Week: 2023
- All-SEC First Team: 2023
- United Soccer Coaches All-Southeast Region Second Team: 2023
- WCC Defensive Player of the Week: 2022
- Florida Gators Defensive Player of the Year: 2023
