= Sydney Schmidt =

American soccer player (born 2008)

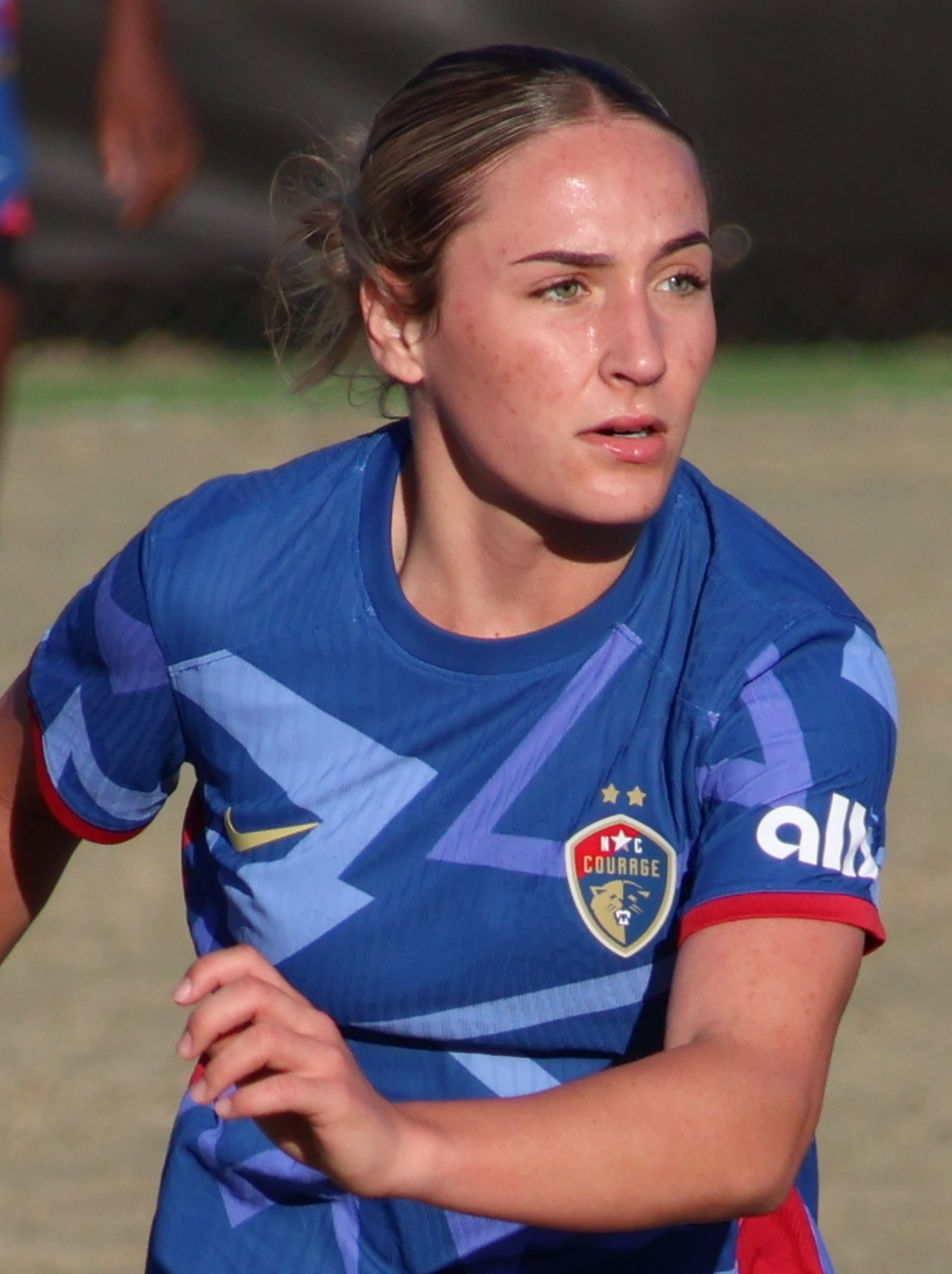
- Schmidt with the North Carolina Courage in 2026

Personal information
- Full name: Sydney James Schmidt
- Date of birth: January 25, 2008 (age 18)
- Height: 5 ft 6 in (1.68 m)
- Positions: Left back; left winger

Team information
- Current team: North Carolina Courage
- Number: 3

Youth career
- Jacksonville FC
- 2019–2025: St. Johns Spartans

Senior career*
Years	Team	Apps	(Gls)
2025	Sporting JAX	2	(0)
2025–	North Carolina Courage	3	(0)

International career^{‡}
2024	United States U-16	3	(0)
2025–	United States U-17	11	(1)
- * Club domestic league appearances and goals as of 06:57, November 8, 2026 (UTC) ‡ National team caps and goals as of October 21, 2025

Sydney James Schmidt (born January 25, 2008) is an American professional soccer player who plays as a left back for the North Carolina Courage of the National Women's Soccer League (NWSL). She played for hometown USL Super League club Sporting JAX before signing with the Courage at age 17 in 2025.

== Early life ==
Schmidt grew up in Jacksonville, Florida, and began playing soccer at age three. She joined the high school team at St. Johns Country Day School in Orange Park, Florida, during sixth grade, and earned regular playing time by eighth grade, winning multiple FHSAA state championships at the end of the school's eleven-year title streak. She led St. Johns with 25 goals as a freshman and was named first-team all-state while finishing as the state runner-up in 2023. She was named All-First Coast Player of the Year by The Florida Times-Union in 2024 after scoring 24 goals as a sophomore and making the state semifinals. She grew up idolizing fellow St. Johns product Carson Pickett, whose father, Mike, coached the school's girls' team. Before going pro, she was committed to play college soccer for the Florida State Seminoles and planned to enroll early in the spring of 2026. She played club soccer for Jacksonville FC, earning multiple ECNL all-conference honors.

== Club career ==
=== Sporting JAX ===
Schmidt joined USL Super League expansion club Sporting JAX on an academy contract (allowing her to keep her college eligibility) before the club's inaugural season. After missing the first few matches on international duty, she made her USL Super League debut as a substitute for Grace Phillpotts in a 2–2 draw against the Carolina Ascent on September 13, 2025. On September 28, she made her first start for Sporting JAX – and her last appearance for the club – helping win 4–3 against the same opposition.

=== North Carolina Courage ===
On October 16, 2025, the NWSL's North Carolina Courage announced the signing of Schmidt to her first professional contract on a deal running through 2027. On March 21, 2026, she made her NWSL debut coming on as a second-half substitute for Feli Rauch in a 0–0 stalemate with Gotham FC. The following week, she made her first NWSL start in a 3–1 loss to Bay FC, becoming the youngest starter in club history; she was pulled before halftime as the Courage were already down three goals. Two months later, her season ended when she suffered a torn anterior cruciate ligament (ACL) in training. Later that year, she signed a one-year extension with the Courage through 2028.

== International career ==
Schmidt began training with the United States under-15 and under-16 teams in 2023. She helped the United States win the U-16 UEFA Friendship Tournament in Turkey in 2024. The following year, she started two games for the under-17 team during 2025 CONCACAF U-17 Women's World Cup qualification. She then helped the under-17s to the title at the 4 Nations Tournament. She was named to the roster for the 2025 FIFA U-17 Women's World Cup in Morocco.

== Personal life ==
Schmidt is the daughter of Brad Schmidt, the boys' soccer coach at St. Johns Country Day School, and Katie Schmidt. Schmidt has one younger brother, John.

== Career statistics ==
=== Club ===
As of match played October 4, 2025

Club	Season	League			Cup		Playoffs		Total	
Club	Season	Division	Apps	Goals	Apps	Goals	Apps	Goals	Apps	Goals
Sporting JAX	2025–26	USL Super League	2	0	—		—		2	0
North Carolina Courage	2025	NWSL	0	0	—		—		0	0
Career total			2	0	0	0	0	0	2	0
