= Zara Siassi =

American soccer player (born 2002)

Personal information
- Date of birth: January 31, 2002 (age 24)
- Height: 5 ft 7 in (1.70 m)
- Position: Defender

Youth career
- 2015–2018: Boca United ECNL

College career
Years	Team	Apps	(Gls)
2020–2024	North Florida Ospreys	82	(2)

Senior career*
Years	Team	Apps	(Gls)
2025–2026	Sporting JAX	0	(0)
- * Club domestic league appearances and goals as of 20:58, June 11, 2026 (UTC)

Zara Siassi (/ˈzɛərəsiˈɑːsi/ ZAIR-uh si-AHS-ee; born January 31, 2002) is an American professional soccer player who plays as a defender. She played college soccer for the North Florida Ospreys, where she became the program's all-time leader in appearances and starts.

== Early life ==
Siassi attended Park Vista Community High School in Lake Worth, Florida. She played club soccer with Boca United ECNL and Weston FC Development Academy and was involved in U.S. Youth Soccer Olympic Development Program's state and regional camps.

== College career ==
Siassi played college soccer at the University of North Florida (UNF) from 2020 to 2024, making 82 appearances and starts — the most in program history. In her senior season in 2024, she led the team in assists (3) and helped the defense achieve six clean sheets. She also scored her second collegiate goal on Senior Day via penalty kick. Following her graduate season, Siassi was named the Atlantic Sun Conference (ASUN) Defensive Player of the Year, becoming the first player in UNF history to receive the honor. She was named a United Soccer Coaches (USC) All-American in 2024. Siassi played over 7,000 minutes across five seasons, including the COVID-19-impacted 2020 campaign.

== Club career ==
On June 3, 2025, Siassi signed her first professional contract with Sporting JAX, an expansion team in the newly launched USL Super League. She was one of the first signings announced by the club ahead of their inaugural season. Siassi joined preseason training on July 8, 2025, ahead of the club’s friendly against Scottish side Hibernian W.F.C. on August 2 and its league debut against DC Power FC on August 23. In 2026, Siassi was named a brand ambassador for Gainbridge, joining eight other players from the USL Super League. She did not make any appearances for Sporting JAX before departing at the end of her rookie season.

== Personal life ==
Siassi, a biomedical sciences major at UNF, comes from a notably athletic family, including an uncle who competed in track and field and a cousin who ran collegiate cross country. She is the only child of Tony Siassi and Susan Bierster. Off the soccer field, she has her own baking company called 'Rize & Grind' and often shares her creations with her teammates. A Christian, Siassi also holds dual citizenship through her father, who was born in the United Kingdom.

== Honors ==
- ASUN Defensive Player of the Year (2024)
- United Soccer Coaches (USC) All-American (Fourth Team, 2024)
- USC Scholar All-American First Team (2024)
- USC All-South Region First Team (2024)
- All-ASUN First Team (2021 [spring], 2024)
- All-ASUN Second Team (2023)
