= Ashlyn Puerta =

American soccer player (born 2007)

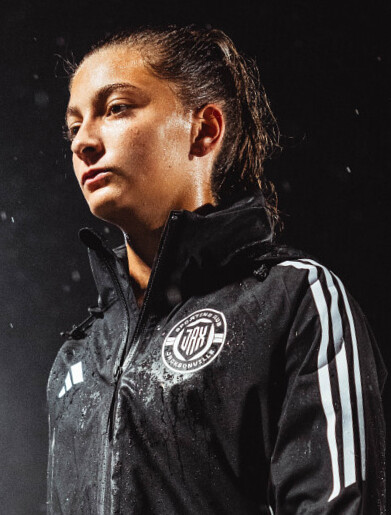
- Puerta with Sporting JAX in 2025

Personal information
- Date of birth: February 27, 2007 (age 19)
- Height: 5 ft 7 in (1.70 m)
- Position: Attacking midfielder

Team information
- Current team: Sporting JAX
- Number: 10

Youth career
- Albion SC

College career
Years	Team	Apps	(Gls)
2024	Florida State Seminoles	21	(4)

Senior career*
Years	Team	Apps	(Gls)
2025–	Sporting JAX	38	(21)

International career^{‡}
2022	United States U-15	5	(5)
2026–	United States U-19	4	(1)
2025–	United States U-20	4	(0)
- * Club domestic league appearances and goals as of November 8, 2026 ‡ National team caps and goals as of June 6, 2025

Ashlyn Puerta (born February 27, 2007) is an American professional soccer player who plays as an attacking midfielder for USL Super League club Sporting JAX. After one season of college soccer with the Florida State Seminoles, she joined Sporting JAX and earned USL Super League Player of the Year honors after her debut season in 2026.

== Early life ==
Puerta grew up in San Diego, California, and began playing soccer at an early age. She played club soccer for Albion SC, leading her team to the Girls Academy (GA) national championship and being named the GA's most valuable player in 2022. In 2023, she played regularly for the club's MLS Next boys' side. Before college, she also trained with National Women's Soccer League (NWSL) club NJ/NY Gotham FC, who offered her professional terms, and European clubs including Benfica and Real Madrid. She was homeschooled through her childhood and graduated early to join Florida State at age 17. Previously ranked by TopDrawerSoccer as the No. 19 recruit in the 2025 class, she became the No. 62 recruit in the 2024 class, part of Florida State's top-ranked incoming class.

== College career ==
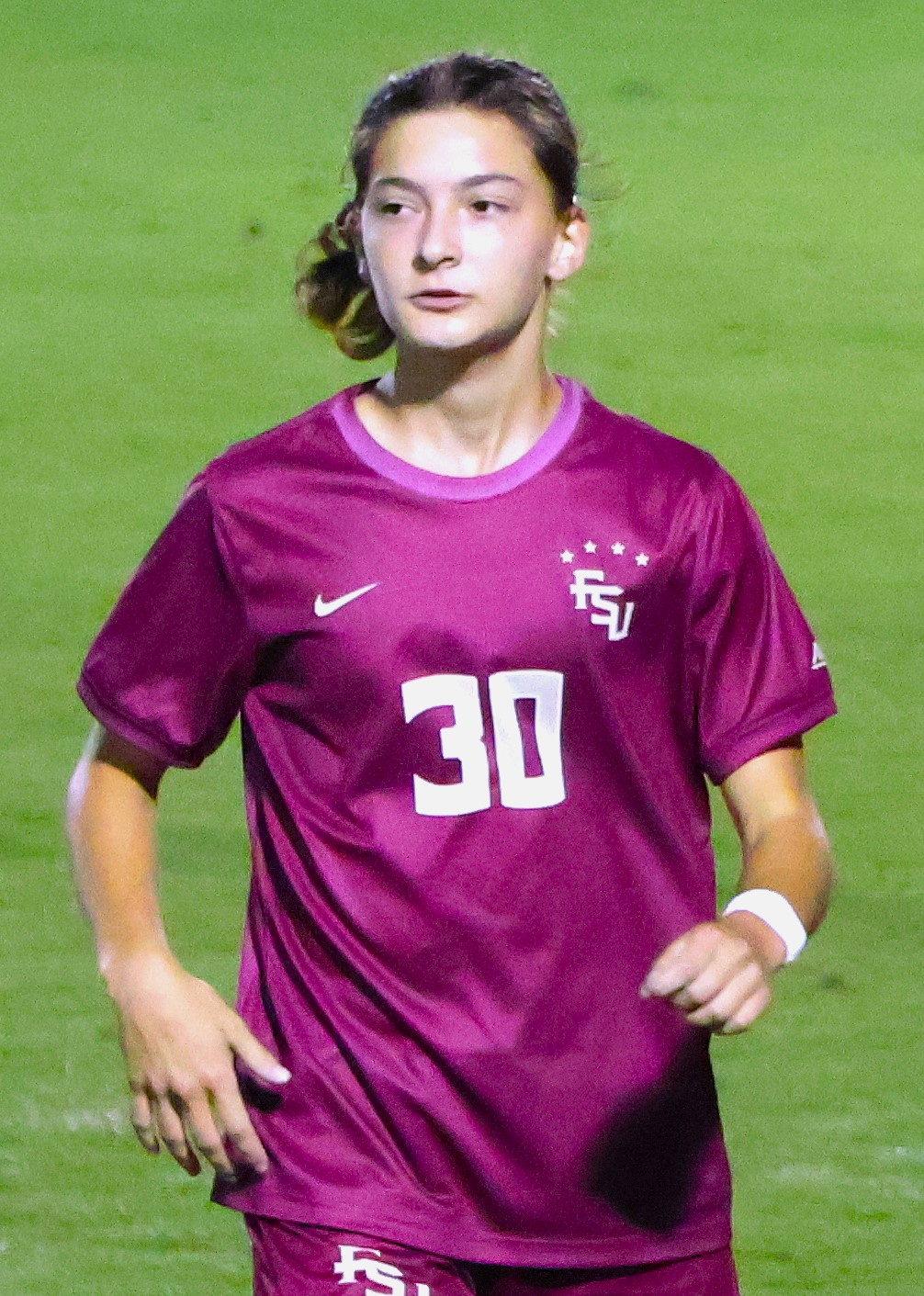
Puerta playing for Florida State in 2024

Puerta played in all 21 games, starting 9, and scored 4 goals with 5 assists for the Florida State Seminoles as a freshman in 2024. She was named the 5th-best freshman in TopDrawerSoccer's midseason rankings and 57th at the end of the season. She helped Florida State win their fifth consecutive ACC tournament and earn a one seed in the NCAA tournament, where they lost in the second round on penalties. After one season at Florida State, she decided to go pro and give up her remaining college eligibility.

== Club career ==
USL Super League expansion club Sporting JAX announced on May 21, 2025, that they had signed Puerta and defender Georgia Brown to their first professional contracts, making them the club's first two signings. She made her professional debut on August 23, playing the entirety of Sporting JAX's inaugural game, a 3–1 loss to DC Power FC. The following week, she scored her first professional goals in a 3–2 victory over defending champions Tampa Bay Sun; she netted twice in four minutes with a penalty and then a tight-angled shot after a corner kick. On September 28, she scored her first professional hat trick in a 4–3 win over the Carolina Ascent, getting all three goals in the first half. Her strong performances (six goals in five games) saw her named Player of the Month for September.

On November 22, 2025, Puerta became the fastest USL Super League player to reach 10 career goals (11 games), scoring against Fort Lauderdale United in Sporting JAX's first home victory. On March 22, 2026, Puerta recorded an assist against the Dallas Trinity to break the league record for goal contributions in a season (17) previously set by Emina Ekić and Allie Thornton in the inaugural campaign (16). On April 25, she scored her first goal of the year from the penalty spot in a 2–1 loss to title challengers Lexington SC, who eventually edged Sporting JAX for the Players' Shield. She finished her rookie season with 12 goals (second in the league behind Catherine Barry) and 7 assists (tied for first), earning the Golden Playmaker Award with the best assist rate in the league. Sporting JAX lost 1–0 to the Carolina Ascent in the playoff semifinals. Her outstanding debut season saw Puerta voted both Player of the Year and Young Player of the Year.

On October 16, 2026, Puerta scored all four goals for her side in a 4–1 victory over Fort Lauderdale United, becoming the first USL Super League player to score four goals in a single match. Two weeks later, scoring twice in a 4–4 draw with Brooklyn FC, she became the fourth player in the league to reach 20 career goals. With seven goals in October, she was named Player of the Month for the second time. The next game, she became the first USL Super League player to reach 30 goal contributions breaking a tie with Addie McCain.

== International career ==
Puerta helped the United States under-15 team win the 2022 CONCACAF Girls' U-15 Championship, scoring five goals with three assists in five games. She trained with the under-16, under-17, and under-18 teams over the following years. She made her under-20 debut at the 2025 CONCACAF Women's U-20 Championship in Costa Rica, where the United States qualified for the 2026 FIFA U-20 Women's World Cup. Following her call-up to the under-20 team later that year, she said, "I feel very blessed and grateful for this opportunity, and I give all glory to God."

Puerta was called into a development camp, training concurrently with the senior national team, in January 2026.

== Personal life ==
Puerta's parents both played college soccer at Cal State Dominguez Hills. She has three siblings.

== Career statistics ==
=== Club ===
As of match played November 15, 2026

Club	Season	League			Cup		Playoffs		Total	
Club	Season	Division	Apps	Goals	Apps	Goals	Apps	Goals	Apps	Goals
Sporting JAX	2025–26	(United States) USLS	27	12	—		1	0	28	12
Sporting JAX	2026	(United States) USLS	12	9	—		—		12	9
Career total			39	21	—		1	0	40	21

== Honors and awards ==
Florida State Seminoles

- Atlantic Coast Conference tournament: 2024

United States U-15

- CONCACAF Girls' U-15 Championship: 2022

Individual

- USL Super League Player of the Year: 2025–26
- USL Super League Young Player of the Year: 2025–26
- USL Super League Golden Playmaker: 2025–26
- USL Super League All-League First Team: 2025–26
- USL Super League Player of the Month: September 2025, October 2026
- USL Super League Team of the Month: September 2025; October 2025; February 2026; August 2026; October 2026
