= Georgia Brown (footballer) =

Footballer (born 2002)

Personal information
- Date of birth: 31 August 2002 (age 24)
- Height: 1.88 m (6 ft 2 in)
- Position: Defender

Team information
- Current team: Sporting JAX
- Number: 5

Youth career
- Oxford United

College career
Years	Team	Apps	(Gls)
2021	Hofstra Pride	22	(7)
2022–2024	South Florida Bulls	54	(10)

Senior career*
Years	Team	Apps	(Gls)
2018–2020	Cheltenham Town	25	(10)
2020–2021	Oxford United	5	(1)
2024	Florida Elite	11	(9)
2025–	Sporting JAX	36	(2)

International career^{‡}
2020	Scotland U-19	2	(0)
2025	Scotland U-23	2	(0)
2025–	Scotland	2	(0)
- * Club domestic league appearances and goals as of date= 15 November 2026 ‡ National team caps and goals as of date=November 2025

Georgia Brown (born 31 August 2002) is a professional footballer who plays as a defender for USL Super League club Sporting JAX. Born in England, she represents Scotland at the international level. Brown played college soccer for the Hofstra Pride and the South Florida Bulls.

She also appeared for Scotland on the youth level, having previously appeared for both the U-19 and U-23 national teams.

== Early life ==
Named after the Harlem Globetrotters' theme song, "Sweet Georgia Brown," she was born in Highworth to Gary and Sandra Brown and qualifies to play for Scotland through her paternal Scottish grandparents. She has one brother, Matthew. Her father played semi-professionally as a goalkeeper.

Brown began playing football as a child and recalled being "bored of sitting on the sidelines" at her brother's youth games for Swindon Town, which led to her getting involved herself. When her local club Highworth Town started a girls' team, Brown "couldn’t wait to be involved." Reflecting on her early career, she said her move to Oxford United at 16 was "a bit bad from me as a Swindon supporter".

She moved to the United States for college, attending Hofstra University and the University of South Florida (USF), from 2021 to 2024. She majored in biomedical sciences. She plays saxophone and is currently learning piano.

== College career ==
=== Hofstra Pride ===
Brown began her collegiate career in 2021 at Hofstra University, where she had an immediate impact as a freshman. She was named the Coastal Athletic Association (CAA) Rookie of the Year and earned multiple honors, including selection to the All-CAA Second Team, the CAA All-Rookie Team, and the College Soccer News Freshman Third Team.

One of her standout performances came in a 5 September 2021, match against the University of Pennsylvania, where she scored the opening goal in the 26th minute to help Hofstra secure a 3–1 win.

=== South Florida Bulls ===
Brown transferred to the University of South Florida ahead of the 2022 season, where she played three years with the South Florida Bulls women's soccer team. She earned American Athletic Conference (AAC) First Team honors in 2024 and was twice named to the Academic All-America teams by both the United Soccer Coaches (USC) and the College Sports Communicators (CSC).

In 2024, Brown made program history by scoring four goals in a single match, setting a new USF school record.

== Club career ==
=== Oxford United Women ===
Before college, Brown played for Oxford United in the FA Women's National League in England, appearing with their first team over a three-year spell.

=== Florida Elite ===
During college off-seasons, she competed with Florida Elite in the USL W League. In 2024, she was named Defender of the Year, helped lead them to the top national ranking, and contributed 11 goals.

=== Sporting JAX ===
After spending time with the club's USL W League squad, on 21 May 2025, USL Super League expansion club Sporting JAX announced that it had signed Brown and Ashlyn Puerta to their first professional contracts, making them the club's first two signings. Brown had previously played for the club's W League side and was the first player introduced at the team's uniform reveal.

At the end of October, Brown was named to the USL Super League Team of the Month for her strong performances. She made the team as a bench player.

The following month, Brown was again named to the USL Super League Team of the Month, this time as a defender. She made the team again for December.

She scored her first professional goal in a 3–0 victory over Spokane Zephyr FC on 11 February 2026.

In March 2026, she was named to the league's team of the month for the fourth time for her contributions in February.

== International career ==
Brown has represented Scotland at U-19 and U‑23 level, receiving call-ups and featuring in at least two matches against Iceland.

On 8 October 2025, Brown was called up to the Scotland women's national football team for two friendlies against Morocco and Switzerland. She earned her first cap in a 4–3 loss to Switzerland.

Brown was called up yet again in late November 2025 for two matches in the 2027 FIFA Women's World Cup qualifiers. She made her first start against China on 2 December 2025. They also played Ukraine during the round. Scotland beat China 3–2 and drew with Ukraine 1–1, respectively.

== Career statistics ==
=== College ===
Season	Games		Scoring				
Season	GP	GS	G	A	PTS	SH	SOG
Hofstra Pride
2021	22	22	7	2	16	59	28
South Florida Bulls
2022	17	17	1	0	2	12	2
2023	18	18	5	1	11	15	8
2024	19	19	4	2	10	19	9
Career
Career total	76	76	17	5	39	105	47

=== Professional ===
As of match played 15 November 2026

Club	Season	League			Cup		Playoffs		Total	
Club	Season	Division	Apps	Goals	Apps	Goals	Apps	Goals	Apps	Goals
Sporting JAX	2025–26	(United States) USLS	26	2	—		1	0	27	2
Sporting JAX	2026	(United States) USLS	10	0	—		—		10	0
Career total			36	2	—		1	0	37	2

== Honours and awards ==
Individual

- USL Super League All-League Second Team: 2025–26
- USL Super League Team of the Month: October 2025; November 2025; December 2025; February 2026
- First-team All-AAC: 2024
- Second-team All-AAC: 2023
- CAA Rookie of the Year: 2021
- Second-team All-CAA: 2021
- USL W League Defender of the Year: 2024
