= Jessie Hunt =

American soccer player (born 2002)

Personal information
- Full name: Jessica Jane Hunt
- Date of birth: January 10, 2002 (age 24)
- Height: 5 ft 9 in (1.75 m)
- Position: Midfielder

Youth career
- Minnesota Thunder

College career
Years	Team	Apps	(Gls)
2020–2021	Wisconsin Badgers	19	(0)
2022–2024	Northeastern Huskies	55	(11)

Senior career*
Years	Team	Apps	(Gls)
2025–2026	Sporting JAX	19	(0)
- * Club domestic league appearances and goals as of May 24, 2026

Jessica Jane Hunt (born January 10, 2002) is an American soccer player who plays as a midfielder. She played college soccer for the Wisconsin Badgers and the Northeastern Huskies before starting her professional career with Sporting JAX of the USL Super League.

== Early life ==
Hunt grew up in Edina, Minnesota, and attended Edina High School, where she earned all-conference honors as a sophomore and all-state honors as a junior. She captained the team as a senior but was sidelined due to injury. She also played club soccer with the Minnesota Thunder in the ECNL, helping the team win the 2018 ECNL Midwest Championship and reach the national quarterfinals in both 2017 and 2018. In 2016, Hunt was invited to the U.S. Soccer Region II ODP Camp. She was also a standout student, earning three Academic All-State honors, recognition as a National Merit Commended Scholar, and receiving the National Book Award.

== College career ==
=== Wisconsin Badgers ===
Hunt began her collegiate career playing for the Wisconsin Badgers. In her freshman year during the spring 2021 season, she made 10 appearances and two starts, totaling 270 minutes. She recorded a season-high 82 minutes in a 1–0 win over the Iowa Hawkeyes. In fall 2021, she appeared in nine matches for the Badgers, playing 144 minutes and setting a season-high with 50 minutes against Providence. She was named to the Big Ten All-Academic Team in fall 2021.

=== Northeastern Huskies ===
Hunt transferred to play for the Northeastern Huskies in 2022, where she became a key playmaker. In her first season, she started all 20 games and led the team with 13 assists—a single-season program record that ranked tied for fourth nationally. She also contributed one goal and finished second on the team with 15 points. Her first collegiate goal was a game-winning penalty against Hofstra.

In 2023, Hunt started all 18 matches, scoring a career-high six goals and adding 10 assists. She led the team in assists, total points (22), and game-winning goals (2), and went 3-for-3 from the penalty spot. She recorded seven multi-point games, including a career-best five points against Hampton.

In her final season in 2024, Hunt appeared in 17 matches with 15 starts, scoring four goals and four assists. On October 20 against Campbell, she set the all-time program assist record with her 26th career assist, finishing with 27. She earned All-Coastal Athletic Association (CAA) Second Team and All-New England Third Team honors in her senior campaign. Despite the Huskies' challenging 2–9–7 season in 2024, Hunt was noted by The Huntington News as a key figure in the midfield, leading the team in assists and contributing significantly to the attack with four goals and 17 shots on goal.

== Club career ==
On June 26, 2025, Sporting JAX, an expansion franchise in the USL Super League, announced they had signed Hunt to their inaugural roster. She was a youth and high school teammate with Sporting JAX teammate, Sophia Boman. She made 19 league appearances as a rookie before departing from Jacksonville at the end of the season.

== Personal life ==
Hunt is the daughter of Bradley and Laura Hunt and has one older brother, Ryan, and two younger sisters. Her role model is her grandfather. After moving to Minnesota from Ohio, her first friend was Sporting JAX teammate Sophia Boman. She began playing soccer at age five. Off the field, she enjoys triathlons, hockey, camping, skiing, water skiing, and spending time outdoors with friends. Her favorite player is Sergio Busquets, and her most cherished soccer memory is scoring in the final seconds to send her high school team to the state tournament.

Hunt majored in bioengineering and biochemistry at Northeastern.

== Career statistics ==
=== Club ===
As of match played May 24, 2026

Club	Season	League			Cup		Playoffs		Total	
Club	Season	Division	Apps	Goals	Apps	Goals	Apps	Goals	Apps	Goals
Sporting JAX	2025–26	USL Super League	19	0	—		1	0	20	0
Career total			19	0	—		1	0	20	0

== Honors ==
- Two-time All-CAA First Team: 2022, 2023
- All-CAA Second Team: 2024
- Two-time All-ECAC Second Team: 2022, 2023
- Two-time All-New England Third Team: 2023, 2024
- Northeastern single-season assist record: 13 (2022)
- Northeastern career assist record: 27
