= Park Vista Community High School =

Location
- 7900 Jog Road; Lake Worth, Florida 33467; United States; 26.558719°N 80.144709°W

Information
- School type: Public
- Established: 2004
- School district: School District of Palm Beach County
- Principal: Enrique Vela
- Teaching staff: 161.60 (on an FTE basis)
- Grades: 9-12
- Enrollment: 2,915 (2023–2024)
- Student to teacher ratio: 18.04
- Colors: Blue, Black and Gray
- Nickname: Cobras
- Website: www.pvchs.com

Park Vista Community High School (PVCHS, PVHS, PV) is a public high school in Lake Worth, Florida, United States.

== Academies ==
Park Vista Community High School offers four academies, or magnet programs, that serve as a specialization of study to the student throughout his or her years at the school. Students in the Information Technology, Medical, and Automotive academies are offered opportunities to earn industry certifications, that will be designated on students' diplomas when they graduate.

== Notable alumni ==
- Tre Mason, NFL football player and son of Vincent Mason of De La Soul, Class of 2011
- Trea Turner, MLB baseball player, Class of 2011
- Trey Amburgey, MLB Player, Class of 2012
- Tevin Homer, NFL football player, Class of 2013
- A. T. Perry, NFL football player, Class of 2018
- Nolan Schanuel, MLB baseball player, class of 2020
- Zara Siassi, professional soccer player, class of 2020
