= Maddie Kemp =

American soccer player

Personal information
- Full name: Madison Marie Kemp
- Date of birth: December 20, 2001 (age 24)
- Height: 5 ft 7 in (1.70 m)
- Positions: Forward; midfielder

Youth career
- 2016–2019: Camas Papermakers

College career
Years	Team	Apps	(Gls)
2019–2023	Gonzaga Bulldogs	68	(23)
2024	Kentucky Wildcats	21	(5)

Senior career*
Years	Team	Apps	(Gls)
2025–2026	Sporting JAX	10	(1)
- * Club domestic league appearances and goals as of February 11, 2026

Madison Marie Kemp (born December 20, 2001) is an American professional soccer player who plays as a forward or midfielder. She played college soccer for the Gonzaga Bulldogs and the Kentucky Wildcats before starting her professional career with USL Super League club Sporting JAX.

== Early life ==
Kemp grew up in Camas, Washington, and starred at Camas High School, scoring 141 goals and adding 37 assists. She was a three-time Washington 4A Player of the Year (2016–2018), earned United Soccer Coaches (USC) All-American honors in 2017 and 2018, and captained her team to the WIAA state championship in 2016.

== College career ==
=== Gonzaga Bulldogs ===
Kemp enrolled at Gonzaga University in 2019 but redshirted due to ACL, MCL, and meniscus injuries. Over five seasons, she made 68 appearances, recording 23 goals and 15 assists. She earned All-West Coast Conference (WCC) Second Team honors in 2023 and WCC All-Academic Honorable Mention in 2022. That same year, she tied her career high with nine goals, including two hat tricks. In October 2023, she earned WCC Offensive Player of the Week after scoring her second hat trick of the season in a 5–2 win over Pacific, becoming the first Gonzaga player with multiple hat tricks since 2019 and moving into the top four in career goals and points.

=== Kentucky Wildcats ===
In 2024, Kemp played for the University of Kentucky as a graduate student. She appeared in 21 matches, scoring 5 goals with 5 assists, totaling 15 points (second on the team). She led the Wildcats with 49 shots (22 on goal) and earned All-Southeastern Conference Third-Team and College Sports Communicators (CSC) Academic All-District honors. In April 2024, during Kentucky’s 4–1 win over Jacksonville State, Kemp scored twice—including a second-half penalty—helping maintain the Wildcats’ undefeated record and leading the team offensively 22–6 in shots.

== Club career ==
After leaving college, Kemp spent time as a preseason trialist with NWSL club Portland Thorns FC. However, she did not make the team's final roster.

Instead, she signed her first professional contract with Sporting JAX on June 18, 2025, becoming a member of the club's inaugural USL Super League squad. Kemp scored her first professional goal in the 39th minute in a match against Carolina Ascent FC. The match ended in a 2–2 draw. After making 10 appearances in her rookie season, Kemp departed from Sporting JAX in July 2026.

== Personal life ==
Kemp also operates a personal training business, offering soccer coaching and conditioning programs. She is a Christian.

== Career statistics ==
=== Club ===
As of match played February 11, 2026

Club	Season	League			Cup		Playoffs		Total	
Club	Season	Division	Apps	Goals	Apps	Goals	Apps	Goals	Apps	Goals
Sporting JAX	2025–26	USL Super League	10	1	—		—		10	1
Career total			10	1	0	0	0	0	10	1

== Honors and awards ==
Individual

- All-WCC Second Team: 2023
- All-SEC Third Team: 2024
