= Sophia Boman =

American soccer player (born 2002)

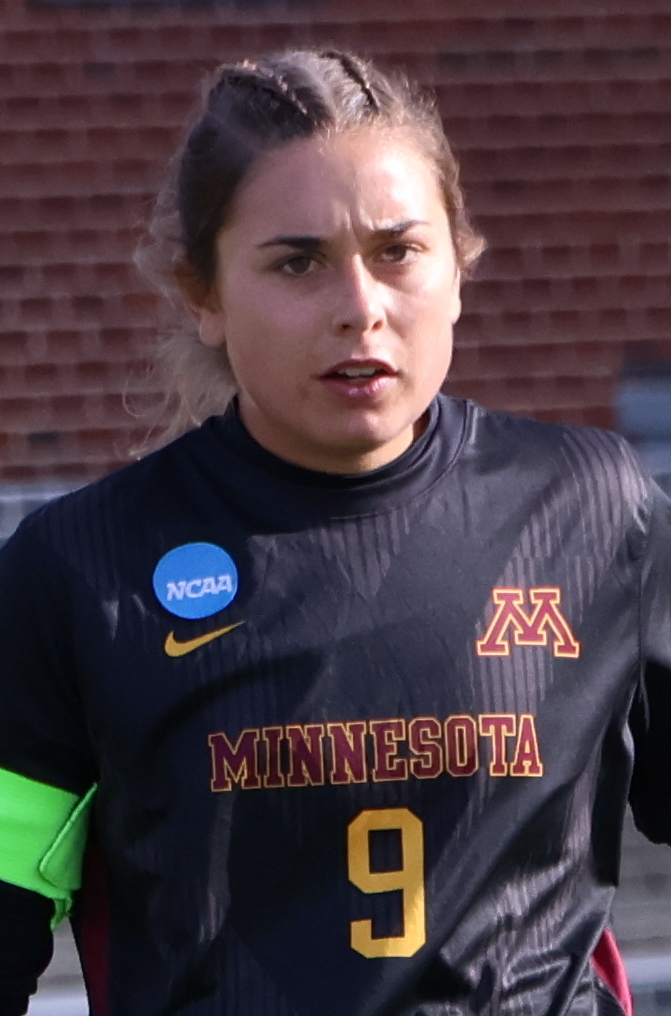
- Boman with Minnesota in 2024

Personal information
- Full name: Sophia Boman
- Date of birth: January 16, 2002 (age 24)
- Place of birth: California, U.S.
- Height: 5 ft 7 in (1.70 m)
- Position: Midfielder

Team information
- Current team: Sporting JAX
- Number: 3

Youth career
- Minnesota Thunder
- 2016–2019: Edina High School

College career
Years	Team	Apps	(Gls)
2020–2024	Minnesota Golden Gophers	86	(24)

Senior career*
Years	Team	Apps	(Gls)
2025–	Sporting JAX	40	(7)
- * Club domestic league appearances and goals as of November 15, 2026

Sophia Boman (born January 16, 2002) is an American professional soccer player who plays as a midfielder for USL Super League club Sporting JAX. She played college soccer for the Minnesota Golden Gophers.

== Early life ==
Born in California, Boman moved to Duluth, Minnesota when she was in kindergarten. She grew up in Edina, Minnesota, one of three daughters born to Steve and Julie Boman. Her mother is a pediatrician. Boman attended Edina High School, where she played soccer all four years and was named All-American twice and the Minnesota Star Tribune All-Metro Player of the Year in 2019. She played club soccer for Minnesota Thunder Academy.

== College career ==
Boman started all 86 games for the Minnesota Golden Gophers from 2020 to 2024, playing the full 90 minutes in all but nine of them. She recorded 16 goals and 15 assists in 64 games during her first four seasons as a central or attacking midfielder, earning Big Ten Conference all-freshman, two-time second-team All-Big Ten, and third-team All-Big Ten honors, and becoming a team captain in her senior season. In her graduate season, she was shifted to defensive midfielder by head coach Erin Chastain and played every minute of the campaign, earning first-team All-Big Ten honors as Minnesota went undefeated at home during the regular season. She scored a career-high eight goals (five of them penalties), including three in the NCAA tournament as Minnesota reached the third round.

== Club career ==
Boman was a trialist with the Kansas City Current in the 2025 preseason. On June 18, 2025, USL Super League expansion club Sporting JAX announced that they had signed Boman to their inaugural roster. She made her professional debut on August 23, playing the entirety of Sporting's inaugural game, a 3–1 loss to DC Power FC. On October 4, she scored her first professional goal and had an assist in a 3–3 draw with Brooklyn FC. She was an important player for Sporting JAX as they led the standings for much of the season.

On May 6, 2026, Boman assisted the only goal by Baylee DeSmit against DC Power FC as Sporting JAX clinched a home playoff game. She finished her rookie season starting all 28 games (leading the club in minutes played) and scoring 6 goals while recording 7 assists. Her assist total tied with three teammates to lead the league. After placing second in the table, Sporting JAX lost 1–0 to the Carolina Ascent in the playoff semifinals.

In September 2026, Boman was named to the USL Super League Team of the Month for her contributions made in August 2026. This was her fourth time named to the team.

== Career statistics ==
=== College ===
As of match played November 24, 2024

Season	Games		Scoring				
Season	GP	GS	G	A	PTS	SH	SOG
Minnesota Golden Gophers
2020–21	12	12	2	1	5	33	11
2022	23	23	8	5	21	36	18
2023	17	17	5	5	15	54	25
2024	22	22	8	1	17	38	22
Career
Career total	74	74	23	12	58	161	76

=== Professional ===
As of match played November 15, 2026

Club	Season	League			Cup		Playoffs		Total	
Club	Season	Division	Apps	Goals	Apps	Goals	Apps	Goals	Apps	Goals
Sporting JAX	2025–26	(United States) USLS	28	6	—		1	0	29	6
Sporting JAX	2026	(United States) USLS	12	1	—		—		12	1
Career total			40	7	—		1	0	41	7

== Honors and awards ==
Individual

- USL Super League Team of the Month: December 2025; March 2026; April 2026; August 2026
- First-team All-Big Ten: 2024
- Second-team All-Big Ten: 2021, 2022
- Third-team All-Big Ten: 2023
