= USL Super League Player of the Month =

Monthly award given to the best USL Super League player

The USL Super League Player of the Month is a monthly women's soccer award given to individual players in the USL Super League (USLS). The honor is awarded to the player deemed to have put in the best performances over the past month by a panel selected by the league.

== Selection ==
The USL Super League Player of the Month is announced by the league each month alongside the Team of the Month on the official USL Super League website. The award recognizes an individual player for outstanding performances during the previous month. While the league has not publicly detailed the specific voting or selection process, the announcement is issued by league staff and presented as part of the monthly performance honors.

== Winners ==
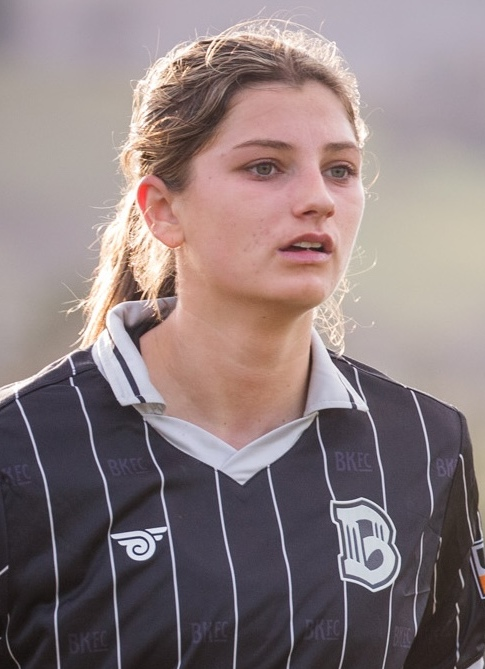
Jess Garziano, September 2024

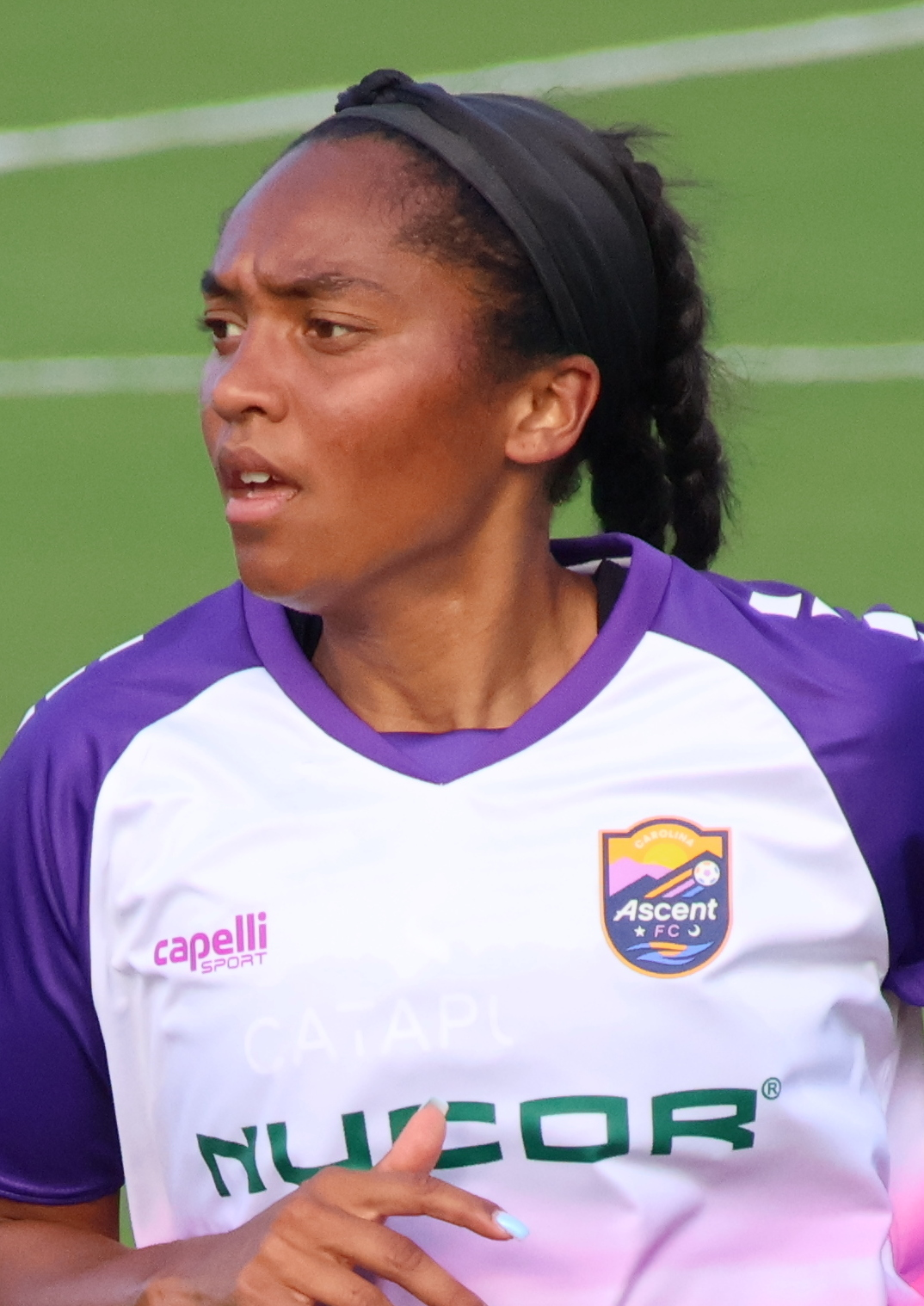
Mia Corbin, March 2025, September 2026

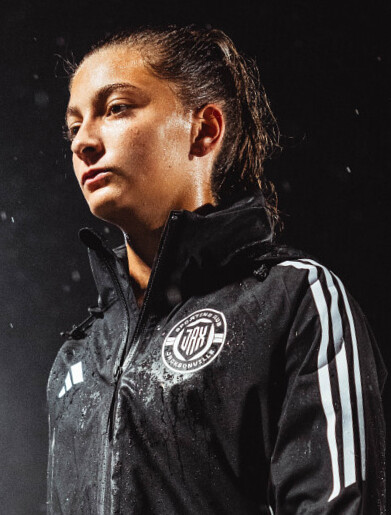
Ashlyn Puerta, September 2025, October 2026

=== 2024 ===
Month	Player of the Month	Club	Statline	Ref.
August	(United States) Ashley Orkus	Tampa Bay Sun FC	13 Saves, 1 CS in 2 games; TB 0–0–2 in August	
September	(United States) Jess Garziano	Brooklyn FC	2 G in 4 games; BKN 3–0–1 in September	
October	(United States) Madi Parsons	Lexington SC	2 G, 2 A in 4 games; LEX 2–1–1 in October	
November	(United States) Sam Meza	Dallas Trinity FC	1 G in 4 games; DAL 3–0–1 in November	
December	(United States) Jasmine Hamid	Fort Lauderdale United FC	1 G, 2 A in 3 games; FTL 3–0–0 in December	
February	(United States) Jasmine Hamid	Fort Lauderdale United FC	2 G in 2 games; FTL 1–0–1 in February	
March	(United States) Mia Corbin	Carolina Ascent FC	4 G in 5 games; CAR 3–2–0 in March	
April	(United States) McKenzie Weinert	Spokane Zephyr FC	3 G, 1 A in 440 minutes; SPK 4–1–0 in April	
May	(Denmark) Cecilie Fløe	Tampa Bay Sun FC	3 G, 2 A in 315 minutes; TB 3–0–1 in May	

=== 2025–26 ===
Month	Player of the Month	Club	Statline	Ref.
September†	(United States) Ashlyn Puerta	Sporting Club Jacksonville	6 G in 5 games; JAX 2–2–1 in 5 weeks	
October	(United States) Audrey Harding	Carolina Ascent FC	1 G, 3 A in 4 games; CAR 3–0–1 in 4 weeks	
November	(United States) Paige Kenton	Sporting Club Jacksonville	2 G, 1 A in 2 games; JAX 2–0–0 in 2 weeks	
December	(England) Chioma Ubogagu	Dallas Trinity FC	1 G, 1 A in 3 games; DAL 3–0–0 in 3 weeks	
February‡	(United States) Kaitlyn Parks	Sporting Club Jacksonville	3 SO in 4 games; JAX 3–1–0 in 4 weeks	
March	(United States) Tyler Lussi	Carolina Ascent FC	2 G in 4 games; CAR 3–0–1 in 4 weeks	
April	(United States) Catherine Barry	Lexington SC	5 G, 1 A in 4 games; LEX 3–1–0 in 4 weeks	

† Combined statistics for August and September
‡ Combined statistics for January and February

=== 2026 ===
Month	Player of the Month	Club	Statline	Ref.
August	(United States) Baylee DeSmit	Sporting Club Jacksonville	4 G in 3 games; JAX 3–0–0 in 3 weeks	
September	(United States) Mia Corbin	Carolina Ascent FC	1 G, 3 A in 4 games; CAR 3–0–1 in 4 weeks	
October	(United States) Ashlyn Puerta	Sporting Club Jacksonville	7 G in 3 games; JAX 1–0–2 in 3 weeks	

== Multiple winners ==
As of November 5, 2026

The below table lists players who have won on more than one occasion.

**Bold**	Indicates current USL Super League player

Rank	Player	Team(s)	Wins	Ref.
1	**Mia Corbin**	Carolina Ascent FC	2	
1	**Jasmine Hamid**	Fort Lauderdale United FC	2	
1	**Ashlyn Puerta**	Sporting Club Jacksonville	2	

== See also ==
- List of sports awards honoring women
- USL Super League awards
- USL Super League Team of the Month
- NWSL Player of the Month
- Women's soccer in the United States
