= Kacey Smekrud =

American soccer player (born 1999)

Personal information
- Full name: Kacey Morgan Smekrud
- Date of birth: November 28, 1999 (age 26)
- Height: 5 ft 11 in (1.80 m)
- Position: Midfielder

Youth career
- Kentucky Fire Juniors
- 2014–2018: Oldham County Colonels

College career
| Years | Team | Apps | (Gls) |
| 2018–2021 | Charleston Cougars | 49 | (3) |
| 2022 | Clemson Tigers | 7 | (0) |

Senior career*
| Years | Team | Apps | (Gls) |
| 2018–2023 | Cincinnati Sirens FC | | (4+) |
| 2021 | Racing Louisville (USLW) | | |
| 2023–2024 | Lexington SC (USLW) | 4 | (0) |
| 2025 | Åland United | 23 | (1) |
| 2026 | Sporting JAX | 14 | (1) |
- * Club domestic league appearances and goals

Kacey Morgan Smekrud (born November 28, 1999) is an American professional soccer player who plays as a midfielder. She played college soccer for the Charleston Cougars, for whom she also competed in track and field, and for the Clemson Tigers. She has previously played professionally for Åland United in Finland's Kansallinen Liiga and Sporting JAX of the USL Super League.

== Early life ==
Smekrud began playing soccer as a child while living in Iceland, where her father was stationed with the United States Air Force. She graduated from Oldham County High School, earning all-region honors three times and being named to the all-state second team as a senior. She also played five years for Kentucky Fire Juniors, helping the club reach back-to-back Kentucky State Cup appearances, including one state championship.

== College career ==
=== Charleston Cougars ===
In 2018, she appeared in 11 matches as a freshman and made her first collegiate start against Winthrop. She scored her first career goal against Wake Forest and recorded 12 shots, including five on goal. As a sophomore in 2019, she played in 17 matches with seven starts and logged 818 minutes, taking 11 shots with three on target. The 2020–21 season was played in spring 2021 due to COVID-19 protocols, and she started all nine matches, leading the team with two goals and four points. She scored against Florida and Clemson and finished the season with 10 shots, seven of them on goal. In 2021, she appeared in 12 matches with four starts, totaling 350 minutes.

In addition to soccer, Smekrud also competed for the College of Charleston's track and field team where she specialized in the 800 metres. She ranks sixth in school history in the indoor 800 and fifth in the outdoor 800, with a personal best of 2:15.77 set at the 2022 Duke Invitational. She also competed in the 800 at the 2022 Coastal Athletic Association (CAA) Championships, recording a time of 2:18.47.

=== Clemson Tigers ===
In 2022, Smekrud transferred to Clemson as a redshirt senior. She appeared in seven matches for the Tigers, totaling 160 minutes played. She recorded three shots on the season, including a season-high two shots against Boston College on October 23, 2022, and logged a season-high 41 minutes against Campbell on August 21, 2022.

== Club career ==
Before turning professional, Smekrud played for several semi-professional and developmental clubs in the United States. She competed with the Cincinnati Sirens in the Women's Premier Soccer League (WPSL) and Premier Arena Soccer League (PASL).

Later, she transitioned to the USL W League, playing for Racing Louisville and Lexington SC. During Lexington's inaugural season, she recorded an assist in the club's first-ever road win—a 6–2 victory over St. Charles FC on June 4, 2023.

Following her collegiate and pre-professional career, Smekrud signed her first professional contract with Åland United in Finland. The club competes in the Kansallinen Liiga, the top tier of women's soccer in Finland. Her move marked her first experience playing professionally outside the United States. She scored her first professional goal against PK-35 Vantaa on October 11, 2025. The following month, she was named the Kansallinen Liiga's Defender of the Month. During the 2025 season, she made 23 league appearances and scored 1 goal for the club.

In January 2026, Smekrud signed with Sporting JAX of the USL Super League, a Division I professional women's league sanctioned by U.S. Soccer. She joined the club midway through the team's inaugural season, marking her return to professional soccer in the United States. She scored her first Super League goal in a 3–0 victory over Lexington SC, her first time playing back in her home state of Kentucky. At the end of the season, she departed from Sporting JAX.

== Career statistics ==
=== College ===
As of match played October 23, 2022

| Season | GP | GS | G | A | PTS | SH | SOG |
Charleston Cougars
| 2018 | 11 | 1 | 1 | 0 | 2 | 12 | 5 |
| 2019 | 17 | 7 | 0 | 0 | 0 | 11 | 3 |
| 2020 | 9 | 9 | 2 | 0 | 4 | 10 | 7 |
| 2021 | 12 | 4 | 0 | 0 | 0 | 6 | 1 |
Clemson Tigers
| 2022 | 7 | 0 | 0 | 0 | 0 | 3 | 1 |
| Career total | 56 | 21 | 3 | 0 | 6 | 42 | 17 |

=== Club ===
As of match played May 24, 2026

| Club | Season | Division | League | | Cup | | Playoffs | | Total | |
| Club | Season | Division | Apps | Goals | Apps | Goals | Apps | Goals | Apps | Goals |
|---|---|---|---|---|---|---|---|---|---|---|
| Åland United | 2025 | Kansallinen Liiga | 23 | 1 | — | | — | | 23 | 1 |
| Sporting JAX | 2025–2026 | USL Super League | 14 | 1 | — | | 0 | 0 | 14 | 1 |
| Career total | | | 37 | 2 | — | | 0 | 0 | 37 | 2 |

* League and club divisions based on publicly available sources.
