= Baylee DeSmit =

American soccer player (born 2002)

Personal information
- Date of birth: September 28, 2002 (age 24)
- Height: 5 ft 7 in (1.70 m)
- Position: Midfielder

Team information
- Current team: Sporting JAX
- Number: 17

Youth career
- 2018–2021: McDonogh School
- –2021: Pipeline SC

College career
Years	Team	Apps	(Gls)
2021–2024	Loyola Greyhounds	72	(36)

Senior career*
Years	Team	Apps	(Gls)
2022	Christos FC	9	(6)
2025	Annapolis Blues FC	6	(4)
2025–	Sporting JAX	36	(21)
- * Club domestic league appearances and goals as of November 15, 2026

Baylee DeSmit (born September 28, 2002) is an American professional soccer player who plays as a midfielder for USL Super League club Sporting JAX. She played college soccer for the Loyola Greyhounds, where she was a two-time Patriot League Offensive Player of the Year and one of the most productive players in program history.

== Early life ==
DeSmit grew up in Towson, Maryland, and attended McDonogh School in Owings Mills, Maryland, where she was a standout multi-sport athlete, having also played basketball and lacrosse. In soccer, she helped lead the school to three IAAM A Conference championships, totaling 52 goals and 28 assists over three seasons. She was named the 2020 Maryland Gatorade Player of the Year, the 2019 Baltimore Sun Player of the Year, and earned United Soccer Coaches (USC) High School All-America honors.

She also played for Pipeline Soccer Club, winning four Maryland State Cup titles and competing in several national tournaments. She was the leading scorer and Golden Ball winner at the 2019 US Youth Soccer National Championships, where her team finished as national finalists.

== College career ==
DeSmit played four seasons, from 2021 to 2024, for the Loyola Greyhounds, appearing in 72 matches and recording 36 goals and 21 assists. She was a two-time Patriot League Offensive Player of the Year (2022, 2023) and a three-time All-Patriot League selection, including back-to-back First Team honors.

In 2023, she led the Patriot League in goals and points, finishing the season ranked among the top single-season performers in Loyola history in assists, points, and goals. For two consecutive seasons, she was named to the Patriot League All-Academic Team in 2023 and 2024, respectively. She also received multiple Midfielder of the Week honors during her career. In September 2023, The Baltimore Sun featured DeSmit in an article highlighting her role as a leading scorer and key player for Loyola Maryland women's soccer, noting her record-setting Golden Boot win in the USL W League and her fearless approach to the game, which she attributes to growing up as the youngest of five siblings with four older brothers.

While at Loyola, DeSmit also played one season with Christos FC of the pre-professional USL W League. She appeared in nine games and scored six goals, with three assists. In 2025, before signing with Sporting JAX, she also played for Annapolis Blues FC's women's side.

== Club career ==
=== Sporting JAX ===
On June 26, 2025, DeSmit signed with Sporting JAX, a newly formed club in the USL Super League, ahead of its inaugural season. She made her professional debut on September 28 — her 23rd birthday. A week later, on October 4, she scored her first professional goal in stoppage time, salvaging a 3–3 draw against Brooklyn FC.

In March 2026, she was named to the USL Super League Team of the Month for the first time, as a bench player. In her second season with Sporting JAX, she was named USL Super League Player of the Month for August 2026. She scored four goals in three matches, helping to lead Sporting JAX to a 3-0-0 start to the season.

== Personal life ==
DeSmit is the daughter of Doug and Debbie DeSmit. Her father was an NCAA Division III All-American soccer player at Calvin College. She has four siblings, including Ryan and Riley, who both played NCAA Division I lacrosse for Towson and Johns Hopkins, respectively. DeSmit has been involved in community service through Acts4Youth, worked at ESF Summer Camps, and was a member of the Fellowship of Christian Athletes.

== Career statistics ==
=== College ===
Season	Games		Scoring				
Season	GP	GS	G	A	PTS	SH	SOG
Loyola Greyhounds
2021	18	16	4	1	9	36	21
2022	18	18	6	7	19	55	26
2023	17	17	10	8	28	68	33
2024	19	19	16	5	37	118	58
Career
Career total	72	70	36	21	93	277	138

=== Professional ===
As of match played November 15, 2026

Club	Season	League			Cup		Playoffs		Total	
Club	Season	Division	Apps	Goals	Apps	Goals	Apps	Goals	Apps	Goals
Sporting JAX	2025–26	(United States) USLS	24	12	—		1	0	25	12
Sporting JAX	2026	(United States) USLS	12	9	—		—		12	9
Career total			36	21	—		1	0	37	21

== Honors and awards ==
Individual

- USL Super League All-League Second Team: 2025–26
- USL Super League Team of the Month: February 2026, April 2026, August 2026, September 2026, October 2026
- Patriot League Offensive Player of the Year: 2022, 2023
- First-team All-Patriot League: 2022, 2023
- Second-team All-Patriot League: 2021
