= Kaitlyn Parks =

American soccer player (born 2001)

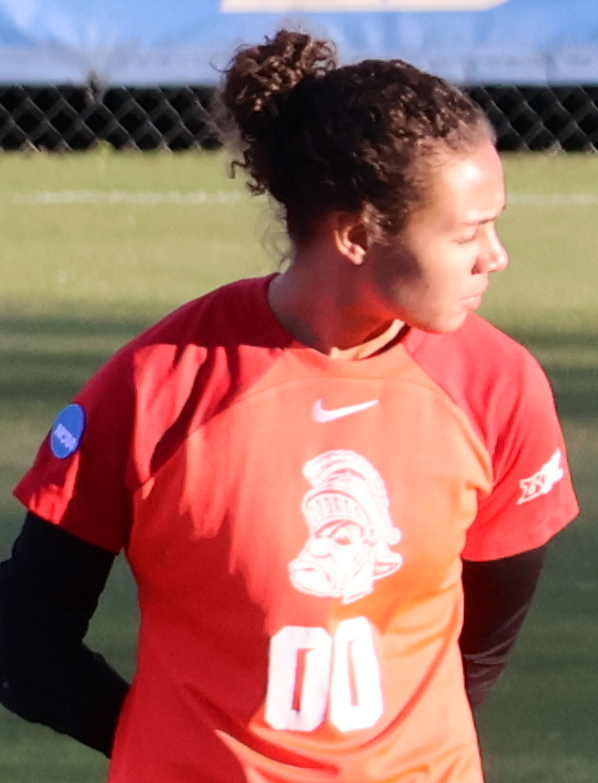
- Parks with Michigan State in 2024

Personal information
- Date of birth: August 30, 2001 (age 25)
- Height: 5 ft 7 in (1.70 m)
- Position: Goalkeeper

Team information
- Current team: Sporting JAX
- Number: 13

Youth career
- 2016–2019: Northern Patriots

College career
Years	Team	Apps	(Gls)
2019–2022	Wake Forest Demon Deacons	29	(0)
2023–2024	Michigan State Spartans	42	(1)

Senior career*
Years	Team	Apps	(Gls)
2025–	Sporting JAX	26	(0)
- * Club domestic league appearances and goals as of October 16, 2026

Kaitlyn Parks (born August 30, 2001) is an American professional soccer player who plays as a goalkeeper for USL Super League club Sporting JAX. She played college soccer for the Wake Forest Demon Deacons and the Michigan State Spartans.

== Early life and education ==
Parks attended Northern High School, where she was a four-year starter in goal. During her high school career, she was named second-team All-State and All-Met, Calvert County Player of the Year as a senior, and led Northern to a Maryland 3A state championship.

== College career ==
=== Wake Forest Demon Deacons ===
Parks began her collegiate career at Wake Forest University in 2019, redshirting her freshman season due to injury. As a redshirt freshman during the 2020–21 season, she started eight matches and posted a 1.50 goals-against average and a .786 save percentage. She was named Atlantic Coast Conference (ACC) Defensive Player of the Week in consecutive weeks, becoming the first player in conference history to do so.

In 2021, Parks earned United Soccer Coaches (USC) Second-Team All-American honors after recording nine shutouts and a 0.79 goals-against average. She was also named to the All-ACC Academic Team.

=== Michigan State Spartans ===
Parks transferred to Michigan State University for the 2023 season. As a senior, she started all 22 matches, recording nine shutouts, 14 wins, a 0.99 goals-against average, and a .734 save percentage, helping lead the Spartans to the third round of the NCAA tournament.

In 2024, as a graduate student, she appeared in 20 matches and recorded 12 wins and eight shutouts. She posted a 0.95 goals-against average and a .824 save percentage. Parks also became the first goalkeeper in Michigan State history to score a goal, converting a penalty kick in a match against Ohio State. She was named Big Ten Goalkeeper of the Week twice during the season and received multiple academic honors.

== Club career ==
=== Sporting JAX ===
On July 1, 2025, Parks signed her first professional contract with USL Super League club Sporting JAX. She made her professional debut in the club's inaugural match against DC Power FC. On October 14, she completed Sporting JAX's first ever clean sheet in a rematch against DC Power FC, winning 1–0. She won Save of the Month for a high-rising save made during the match.

On December 3, 2025, Parks was named to the USL Super League Team of the Month for November 2025. During that period, she completed two consecutive clean sheets and helped lead Sporting JAX to their first-ever home win.

In March 2026, Parks was named USL Super League Player of the Month for her contributions made during the month of February. She allowed only one goal and the team won three of four matches.

In April 2026, she was again named to the Team of the Month, but as a bench player.

== Personal life ==
Parks is the daughter of Janet and Stephen Parks and has one older brother. Both of her parents were collegiate athletes at Gannon University. She earned a degree in Studio Art from Wake Forest and completed graduate coursework in Digital Media at Michigan State.

== Career statistics ==
=== College ===
Season	Games		Goalkeeping			
Season	GP	GS	Minutes	Saves	GAA	Shutouts
Wake Forest Demon Deacons
2019	Injured – Did not participate					
2020–21	9	8	781	43	1.50	4
2021	20	20	1,725	58	0.78	9
2022	19	19	1,663	49	0.87	8
Michigan State Spartans
2023	22	22	1,907	58	0.99	8
2024	20	20	1,806	89	0.95	8
Career
Career total	90	89	7,882	297	1.02	37

=== Professional ===
As of match played October 16, 2026

Club	Season	League			Cup		Playoffs		Total	
Club	Season	Division	Apps	CS	Apps	CS	Apps	CS	Apps	CS
Sporting JAX	2025–26	(United States) USLS	23	10	—		1	0	24	10
Sporting JAX	2026	(United States) USLS	3	0	—		—		3	0
Career total			26	10	—		0	0	27	10

== Honors and awards ==
Michigan State Spartans

- Big Ten Conference: 2023

Individual

- USL Super League All-League Second Team: 2025–26
- USL Super League Player of the Month: February 2026
- Second-team All-American: 2021
- Third-team All-Big Ten: 2024
