= Caroline Murray =

American soccer player (born 1993)

Personal information
- Full name: Caroline Griffith Murray
- Date of birth: May 5, 1993 (age 33)
- Height: 5 ft 5 in (1.65 m)
- Positions: Forward; midfielder

Team information
- Current team: Sporting JAX
- Number: 12

College career
Years	Team	Apps	(Gls)
2012–2013	Ohio State Buckeyes	27	(0)
2014–2015	New Hampshire Wildcats	40	(3)

Senior career*
Years	Team	Apps	(Gls)
2016	Sudet	0	(0)
2017	FH Hafnarfjörður	18	(3)
2018–2019	Västerås BK30	3	(0)
2020	Sunnanå SK	3	(0)
2021–2022	AIK	42	(0)
2022–2023	Næstved	10	(0)
2024–2025	Throttur	30	(3)
2025–	Sporting JAX	15	(0)
- * Club domestic league appearances and goals as of October 16, 2026

Caroline Griffith Murray (born May 5, 1993) is an American professional soccer player who plays as a forward for USL Super League club Sporting JAX. She has previously played in the Nordic countries of Finland, Iceland, Sweden, and Denmark, including a stint with AIK in Sweden’s Damallsvenskan.

== Early life and college career ==
Murray grew up in New Canaan, Connecticut. She began her college career at Ohio State University, appearing in 27 matches from 2012 to 2013.

She transferred to the University of New Hampshire, playing from 2014 to 2015. Murray earned America East Midfielder of the Year honors in 2015 and was a two-time All-Conference selection. In 2014, she helped lead UNH to its first women's soccer America East tournament title, scoring the championship-winning goal.

== Club career ==
=== Finland, Iceland, Sweden, and Denmark ===
Murray began her professional career in 2016 with Sudet in the Finnish league, Kakkonen. The following season, she signed with FH Hafnarfjörður in Iceland. She then spent time with Västerås BK30 and Sunnanå SK in Sweden before playing for Næstved in Denmark. Following her stint in Denmark, she joined AIK in Sweden’s Damallsvenskan and finished her European career at Þróttur in Iceland. At Þróttur, she was a regular starter, contributing goals and assists as a central midfielder.

=== AIK ===
On January 28, 2021, Murray signed with newly promoted Damallsvenskan club AIK. The club manager Anne Mäkinen praised her as "technical, fast and strong—a winner mentality" with tactical versatility. Over two seasons, she made 42 league appearances. Following AIK’s relegation, the club confirmed Murray would depart in November 2022, thanking her for her contributions.

=== Throttur Reykjavík ===
In early 2024, Murray joined Knattspyrnufélagið Þróttur ("Throttur") in Iceland's top division, the Besta deild kvenna, after two seasons in Denmark. During the 2024 season, she played all 23 league matches, scored three goals, and was named by Morgunblaðið as the best of the older players in the league.

In 2025, after featuring in seven league matches and recording two assists, it was announced she would leave Throttur to join Sporting JAX in the USL Super League.

=== Sporting JAX ===
On June 3, 2025, Murray signed with Sporting JAX of the USL Super League, a fully professional Division I league sanctioned by the United States Soccer Federation.

== Career statistics ==
=== College ===
Season	Games		Scoring				
Season	GP	GS	G	A	PTS	SH	SOG
Ohio State Buckeyes
2011	9	0	0	2	2	5	1
2012	18	0	0	2	2	19	7
New Hampshire Wildcats
2014	21	21	2	5	9	60	31
2015	19	19	1	8	10	48	20
Career
Career total	67	40	3	17	23	132	59

=== Club ===
As of match played October 16, 2026

Club	Season	Division	League		Cup		Playoffs		Total	
Club	Season	Division	Apps	Goals	Apps	Goals	Apps	Goals	Apps	Goals
Sudet	2016	(Finland) Kakkonen	0	0	—		—		0	0
FH Hafnarfjörður	2017	(Iceland) Besta deild kvenna	18	3	—		—		18	3
Västerås BK30	2018–2019	(Sweden) Division 1	3	0	—		—		3	0
Sunnanå SK	2020	(Sweden) Elitettan	3	0	—		—		3	0
AIK	2021–2022	(Sweden) Damallsvenskan	42	0	—		—		42	0
Næstved	2022–2023	(Denmark) Kvinde 1. Division	10	0	—		—		10	0
Throttur	2024–2025	(Iceland) Besta deild kvenna	30	3	—		—		30	3
Sporting JAX	2025–26	(United States) USL Super League	15	0	—		0	0	15	0
Career total			121	6	—		0	0	121	6

* League and club divisions based on publicly available sources.

== Honors ==
- NSCAA All-East Academic Third Team: 2014
- NEWISA All-New England Second Team: 2014
- America East All-Conference Second Team: 2014
- America East All-Championship Team: 2014
- America East Midfielder of the Year: 2015
- NSCAA Scholar All-East Region Third Team: 2015
- NSCAA All-Region Third Team: 2015
- NEWISA Division I All-New England First Team: 2015
- America East All-Conference First Team: 2015
- America East All-Academic Team: 2015
- America East Assist Leader: 2015
