= 2026 Sporting Club Jacksonville (women) fall season =

Sporting JAX women's inaugural season in the USL Super League

Sporting Club Jacksonville
2026 season
- Sporting director Head of Soccer: Mark Warburton
- Head coach: Stacey Balaam
- Stadium: Hodges Stadium
- USL Super League: N/A
- Top goalscorer: Baylee DeSmit; Ashlyn Puerta (9 goals)
- Highest home attendance: N/A
- Lowest home attendance: N/A
- Average home league attendance: N/A
- Biggest win: 4–1 (vs FTL, October 16, 2026)
- Biggest defeat: 2 matches by 1 goal
Home colors	Away colors
- All statistics correct as of 19 November 2026.

The 2026 season is the second season for Sporting Club Jacksonville and the club's second in the USL Super League (USLS), one of two leagues sanctioned as the top tier of women's soccer in the United States.

== Background ==
In June 2026, the USL Super League abbreviated the 2026 fall season to transition from its previous fall-to-spring calendar to a spring-to-fall schedule beginning in 2027. The shortened season features just eight teams, beginning August 15 and concluding with the championship game on December 12. The compressed schedule is essentially a bridge between the league's first two seasons and its new calendar, which will align the Super League with the National Women's Soccer League (NWSL) and other North American leagues. Although the 2026 season is shorter, the shift creates greater long-term alignment and makes it easier for teams and players to operate within the broader United States women's soccer landscape.

== Players ==
=== Current roster ===
As of August 21, 2026

Note: Flags indicate national team as defined under FIFA eligibility rules; some limited exceptions apply. Players may hold more than one non-FIFA nationality.

No.	Pos.	Nation	Player
0	GK	USA	Amanda Poorbaugh
1	GK	GER	Jamie Gerstenberg
3	MF	USA	Sophia Boman
4	FW	USA	AJ Hennessey
5	DF	SCO	Georgia Brown
7	MF	USA	Meg Hughes
8	MF	USA	Sophie Jones (captain)
9	MF	USA	Maci Teater
10	MF	USA	Ashlyn Puerta
11	FW	ESP	Andrea Fernández
12	MF	USA	Caroline Murray
13	GK	USA	Kaitlyn Parks

No.	Pos.	Nation	Player
15	MF	USA	Cat Rapp
17	FW	USA	Baylee DeSmit
18	MF	CAN	Mélina Descary
20	DF	USA	Keeley Dockter
21	MF	USA	Mya Swinton
22	MF	USA	Parker Roberts (vice-captain)
23	DF	USA	Ginger Fontenot
24	DF	USA	Grace Phillpotts
27	FW	USA	Paige Kenton
32	DF	USA	Maggie Illig
36	MF	USA	Coco Thistle

==== Out on loan ====
Note: Flags indicate national team as defined under FIFA eligibility rules; some limited exceptions apply. Players may hold more than one non-FIFA nationality.

No.	Pos.	Nation	Player
16	MF	NZL	Helena Errington (on loan to Fimleikafélag Hafnarfjarðar)

==== Academy players ====
Note: Flags indicate national team as defined under FIFA eligibility rules; some limited exceptions apply. Players may hold more than one non-FIFA nationality.

No.	Pos.	Nation	Player
19	MF	USA	Presley Cason

=== Ownership ===
As of November 24, 2025

Ownership
Majority owner	Ricky Caplin
Minority owner	Steve Livingstone
Minority owner	Tony Allegretti
Minority owner	Tim Tebow
Minority owner	Fred Taylor

=== Executive ===
As of December 31, 2025

Executive
Club President and CEO	Steve Livingstone
Executive Vice President of Business Management	J.J. Keitzer
Chief Community Officer	Tony Allegretti
Vice President of Ticket Sales & Service	Tim Hensley
Special Advisor to the President	Bob Ohrablo
Team Advisor	Becky Burleigh
Director of Marketing and Brand	David Phillips
Director of Broadcasting and Digital Content	Cole Pepper
Director of Ticket Sales and Services	Jack Gonzalez
Senior Manager, Business Operations and Development	Sara Garcia-Malone
Head of Operations	Marshall Happer
Merchandise Manager	Anthony Ortiz

=== Technical staff ===
As of June 17, 2025

Position	Name
Head of Soccer, Sporting Director	(England) Mark Warburton
Head Coach	(England) Stacey Balaam
Associate Head Coach	(England) Alan Kirkup
Goalkeeper Coach	(United States) Mat Cosgriff
Head of Sports Performance	(United States) Steve Fell

== Transfers ==
=== In ===
Player	Previous Squad	Date	Ref.
(United States) Ginger Fontenot	(United States) Spokane Zephyr FC	June 25, 2026	
AJ Hennessey	(United States) TCU Horned Frogs	June 25, 2026	
(United States) Keeley Dockter	(United States) Seattle Reign FC	July 1, 2026	
Amanda Poorbaugh	(United States) Penn State Nittany Lions	July 1, 2026	
(United States) Maci Teater	(United States) Vanderbilt Commodores	July 9, 2026	
Mélina Descary	(United States) South Alabama Jaguars	July 9, 2026	
Mya Swinton	(United States) West Florida Argonauts	July 15, 2026	
Cat Rapp	(United States) Spokane Zephyr FC	August 21, 2026	

=== Out ===
Player	Transferred To	Date	Ref.
(Puerto Rico) Cristina Roque	Free agent	June 9, 2026	
(United States) Katie Sullivan	Free agent	June 9, 2026	
(United States) Kacey Smekrud	Free agent	June 9, 2026	
(United States) Jessie Hunt	Free agent	June 9, 2026	
(United States) Abby Boyan	Free agent	June 9, 2026	
(United States) Julia Lester	Free agent	June 9, 2026	
(England) Jade Pennock	Free agent	June 9, 2026	
(United States) Zara Siassi	Free agent	June 9, 2026	
(United States) Maddie Kemp	Free agent	June 9, 2026	

== Preseason ==
Sporting JAX traveled to England and Wales in July 2026 for the first overseas trip in the club's women's team's history. The club played Wrexham A.F.C. Women on July 16 and also scheduled a closed-door scrimmage against Newcastle United W.F.C.. The trip served as the team's primary preseason preparation ahead of its second Gainbridge Super League season. Sporting JAX won 5–0 over Wrexham.

== Regular season ==
Sporting JAX opened its season on August 15 with a 1–0 away victory over Fort Lauderdale United FC. Baylee DeSmit scored the winning goal in the 89th minute from a free kick after Andrea Fernández was fouled just outside the penalty area. Sporting JAX narrowly outshot Fort Lauderdale 7–6, while goalkeeper Jamie Gerstenberg made two saves to record a clean sheet.

On October 16, 2026, midfielder Ashlyn Puerta became the first player in USL Super League history to score four goals in a single match, leading her team to a 4-1 victory over Fort Lauderdale United at Hodges Stadium. Puerta, then 19, recorded her historic performance by converting a 24th-minute penalty kick, adding a go-ahead goal in the 57th minute, completing a hat trick in the 74th minute, and capping the scoring in the 84th minute. The win snapped a four-game winless drought for Sporting Jax and brought Puerta's career league goal total to 17.

== Broadcasting ==
In August 2025, Sporting JAX announced a broadcast partnership ahead of its inaugural season. The agreement includes local television coverage of most home matches through partnerships with First Coast News (WTLV NBC 12/WJXX ABC 25) and News4Jax (WJXT 4), making matches accessible to viewers across Northeast Florida and Southeast Georgia. Select Saturday home games will air on WJXT Channel 4, while additional matches will be broadcast on WJXX ABC 25, WTLV NBC 12, and QUEST 25.3. The season opener, along with all home and away fixtures, will also stream on Peacock, in line with league broadcasting regulations. The club's leadership emphasized the importance of regional accessibility and community engagement through local media partnerships.

== Competitions ==
=== Friendlies ===
July 16, 2026 1	Wrexham A.F.C. Women (Wales)	0–5	(United States) Sporting JAX	Rhosymedre, Wrexham County Borough, Wales
2:00 PM ET		Report	Kenton 9'; DeSmit 17'; Fontenot 20'; Fernández 61', 76'	Stadium: The Rock, Rhosymedre

=== USL Super League ===
==== League table ====
Pos	Team	Pld	W	L	T	GF	GA	GD	Pts	Qualification
1	Carolina Ascent FC	12	8	1	3	20	8	+12	27	Playoffs
2	DC Power FC	13	7	3	3	21	12	+9	24	Playoffs
3	Sporting Club Jacksonville	12	4	2	6	25	20	+5	18	Playoffs
4	Lexington SC	12	5	5	2	20	13	+7	17	Playoffs
5	Dallas Trinity FC	11	4	4	3	14	14	0	15	

Updated to match(es) played on November 15, 2026. Source: USL Super League
Rules for classification: 1) head-to-head points; 2) total goal differential; 3) total goals scored; 4) disciplinary points; 5) drawing of lots.

==== Results summary ====
Overall								Home						Away					
Pld	W	D	L	GF	GA	GD	Pts	W	D	L	GF	GA	GD	W	D	L	GF	GA	GD
13	5	6	2	26	20	+6	21	4	2	1	15	9	+6	1	4	1	11	11	0

Last updated: November 21, 2026.
Source: GainbridgeSuperLeague.com

==== Match results ====
August 15, 2026 1	Fort Lauderdale United FC	0–1	Sporting JAX	Davie, Florida
7:30 PM ET	Thompson (yellow card) 56'; Moyer (yellow card) 89'; Thomas (yellow card) 90+4'	Report	Illig (yellow card) 50'; DeSmit 89'	Stadium: Amerant Bank Field; Attendance: 1,357; Referee: Patricia McCracken

August 22, 2026 2	Sporting JAX	3–2	Tampa Bay Sun FC	Jacksonville, Florida
7:00 PM ET	Jones (yellow card) 38'; Puerta 46'; DeSmit 60', 70'	Report	Connors 35'; Zade 76'	Stadium: Hodges Stadium; Attendance: 908; Referee: Gloria Martinez

August 29, 2026 3	Sporting JAX	2–0	Dallas Trinity FC	Jacksonville, Florida
7:00 PM ET	DeSmit 45'; Boman 79'	Report	Hamid (penalty missed) 90+1'	Stadium: Hodges Stadium; Attendance: 696; Referee: Mario Maric

September 4, 2026 4	DC Power FC	1–1	Sporting JAX	Washington, D.C.
7:00 PM ET	Constant 59'; Constant (yellow card) 86'	Report	Illig 63'	Stadium: Audi Field; Attendance: 1,381; Referee: Lauren Aldrich

September 13, 2026 4	Brooklyn FC	3–2	Sporting JAX	Brooklyn, New York
3:00 PM ET	Zimmerman 5', 82'; King 10'; Cudjoe (yellow card) 57'; Zimmerman (yellow card) 74'	Report	DeSmit 17'; DeSmit (yellow card) 57'; Teater (yellow card) 76'; Kenton 90+4'	Stadium: Maimonides Park; Attendance: 713; Referee: Marie Durr

September 20, 2026 6	Sporting JAX	0–1	Lexington SC	Jacksonville, Florida
5:00 PM ET		Report	Weinert 59'	Stadium: Hodges Stadium; Attendance: 803; Referee: Natalie Simon

September 26, 2026 7	Carolina Ascent FC	3–3	Sporting JAX	Charlotte, North Carolina
7:00 PM ET	Groom 39'; Groom (yellow card) 49'; Aguilera 61'; Poole (yellow card) 67'; Butler (yellow card) 76'; Tappan 83'; Parker (yellow card) 85'; Cook (yellow card) 90+3'	Report	DeSmit 20', 78' (pen.); Hennessey 71'; Hennessey (yellow card) 51'; Hughes (yellow card) 68'	Stadium: American Legion Memorial Stadium; Attendance: 2,281; Referee: Adorae Monroy

October 16, 2026 8	Sporting JAX	4–1	Fort Lauderdale United FC	Jacksonville, Florida
7:30 PM ET	Puerta 24' (pen.), 57', 74', 84'; Hennessey (yellow card) 69'	Report	Gordon 8'	Stadium: Hodges Stadium; Attendance: 843; Referee: Stefan Perri

October 23, 2026 9	Lexington SC	3–3	Sporting JAX	Lexington, Kentucky
7:30 PM ET	Griffith 11'; Barry 16'; McCain 45'; Murray (yellow card) 63'	Report	Puerta 18'; Kenton 45+1'; Brown 85' (o.g.); Fontenot (yellow card) 65'; Descary (yellow card) 67'	Stadium: Lexington SC Stadium; Attendance: 2,466; Referee: Iryna Petrunok

October 31, 2026 10	Sporting JAX	4–4	Brooklyn FC	Jacksonville, Florida
2:00 PM ET	DeSmit 27'; Kenton 33'; Puerta 68' (pen.), 80'; Hughes (yellow card) 90+5'	Report	Zimmerman 14'; Miller 25'; Cudjoe (yellow card) 38'; Richards 56', 57'	Stadium: Hodges Stadium; Attendance: 652; Referee: Russell Miller

November 8, 2026 11	Dallas Trinity FC	1–1	Sporting JAX	Dallas, Texas
5:00 PM ET	Hamid 24'; Cheesman (yellow card) 38'; Boeckmann (yellow card) 50'	Report	Jones (yellow card) 34'; Puerta 58'	Stadium: Cotton Bowl; Attendance: 1,731; Referee: Jorge Escobar

November 15, 2026 12	Sporting JAX	1–1	DC Power FC	Jacksonville, Florida
5:00 PM ET	DeSmit 60'	Report	Boyan 35'	Stadium: Hodges Stadium; Attendance: 428; Referee: Jamie Padilla

November 21, 2026 13	Sporting JAX	1–0	Carolina Ascent FC	Jacksonville, Florida
5:00 PM ET	Dockter 70'; Descary (yellow card) 73'	Report		Stadium: Hodges Stadium; Attendance: N/A; Referee: Elvis Osmanovic

November 28, 2026 14	Tampa Bay Sun FC	v	Sporting JAX	Tampa, Florida
6:00 PM ET				Stadium: Suncoast Credit Union Field

== Statistics ==
=== Appearances ===
As of match played November 15, 2026

Players with no appearances are not included on the list

No.	Player	Nat.	Total		Regular Season		Playoffs	
No.	Player	Nat.	Apps	Starts	Apps	Starts	Apps	Starts
Goalkeepers
1	Jamie Gerstenberg	(Germany)	9	9	9	9	TBD	
13	Kaitlyn Parks	(United States)	3	3	3	3	TBD	
Defenders
5	Georgia Brown	(Scotland)	10	10	10	10	TBD	
20	Keeley Dockter	(United States)	4	1	4	1	TBD	
22	Parker Roberts	(United States)	1	1	1	1	TBD	
23	Ginger Fontenot	(United States)	11	5	11	5	TBD	
24	Grace Phillpotts	(United States)	12	12	12	12	TBD	
32	Maggie Illig	(United States)	10	10	10	10	TBD	
Midfielders
3	Sophia Boman	(United States)	12	12	12	12	TBD	
7	Meg Hughes	(United States)	12	12	12	12	TBD	
8	Sophie Jones	(United States)	12	12	12	12	TBD	
9	Maci Teater	(United States)	7	1	7	1	TBD	
10	Ashlyn Puerta	(United States)	12	11	12	11	TBD	
12	Caroline Murray	(United States)	2	1	2	1	TBD	
15	Cat Rapp	(United States)	3	0	3	0	TBD	
18	Mélina Descary	(Canada)	11	2	11	2	TBD	
21	Mya Swinton	(United States)	5	0	5	0	TBD	
36	Coco Thistle	(United States)	3	0	3	0	TBD	
Forwards
4	AJ Hennessey	(United States)	9	8	9	8	TBD	
11	Andrea Fernández	(Spain)	4	0	4	0	TBD	
17	Baylee DeSmit	(United States)	12	12	12	12	TBD	
27	Paige Kenton	(United States)	10	10	10	10	TBD	

=== Goalscorers ===
Last updated November 15, 2026

Rank	No.	Nat.	Name	USLS	Playoffs	Total
1	10	(United States)	Ashlyn Puerta	9	—	9
1	17	(United States)	Baylee DeSmit	9	—	9
3	27	(United States)	Paige Kenton	3	—	3
4	3	(United States)	Sophia Boman	1	—	1
4	4	(United States)	AJ Hennessey	1	—	1
4	32	(United States)	Maggie Illig	1	—	1
Own goals				1	—	1
Total				25	—	25

=== Assists ===
Last updated November 15, 2026

Rank	No.	Nat.	Name	USLS	Playoffs	Total
1	27	(United States)	Paige Kenton	3	0	3
2	7	(United States)	Meg Hughes	2	0	2
2	8	(United States)	Sophie Jones	2	0	2
2	10	(United States)	Ashlyn Puerta	2	0	2
2	17	(United States)	Baylee DeSmit	2	0	2
6
6	11	(Spain)	Andrea Fernández	1	0	1
6	15	(United States)	Cat Rapp	1	0	1
6	24	(United States)	Grace Phillpotts	1	0	1
6	36	(United States)	Coco Thistle	1	0	1
Total				15	0	15

=== Clean sheets ===
Last updated November 15, 2026

Rank	No.	Nat.	Name	USLS	Playoffs	Total
1	1	(Germany)	Jamie Gerstenberg	2	—	2
Total				2	—	2

=== Disciplinary record ===
Last updated November 15, 2026

Player			Regular Season			Playoffs			Total		
No.	Nat.	Name	Yellow card	(yellow card) (yellow-red card)	Red card	Yellow card	(yellow card) (yellow-red card)	Red card	Yellow card	(yellow card) (yellow-red card)	Red card
4	(United States)	AJ Hennessey	2	—	—	—	—	—	2	—	—
7	(United States)	Meg Hughes	2	—	—	—	—	—	2	—	—
8	(United States)	Sophie Jones	2	—	—	—	—	—	2	—	—
9	(United States)	Maci Teater	1	—	—	—	—	—	1	—	—
17	(United States)	Baylee DeSmit	1	—	—	—	—	—	1	—	—
18	(Canada)	Mélina Descary	1	—	—	—	—	—	1	—	—
23	(United States)	Ginger Fontenot	1	—	—	—	—	—	1	—	—
32	(United States)	Maggie Illig	1	—	—	—	—	—	1	—	—
Total			11	—	—	—	—	—	11	—	—

== Awards ==
=== USL Super League Player of the Month ===
Month	Player	Position	Ref
August	(United States) Baylee DeSmit	FW	
October	(United States) Ashlyn Puerta	MF	

=== USL Super League Team of the Month ===
Month	Player	Position	Ref
August	(Germany) Jamie Gerstenberg	GK	
August	(United States) Sophia Boman	MF	
August	(United States) Baylee DeSmit	FW	
August	(United States) Ashlyn Puerta	Bench	
September	(United States) Baylee DeSmit (2)	FW	
October	(United States) Ashlyn Puerta (2)	MF	
October	(United States) Baylee DeSmit (3)	Bench	
October	(United States) Paige Kenton	Bench	

=== USL Super League Coach of the Month ===
Month	Coach	Ref
August	(England) Stacey Balaam	
