= Julia Lester (soccer) =

American soccer player (born 1998)

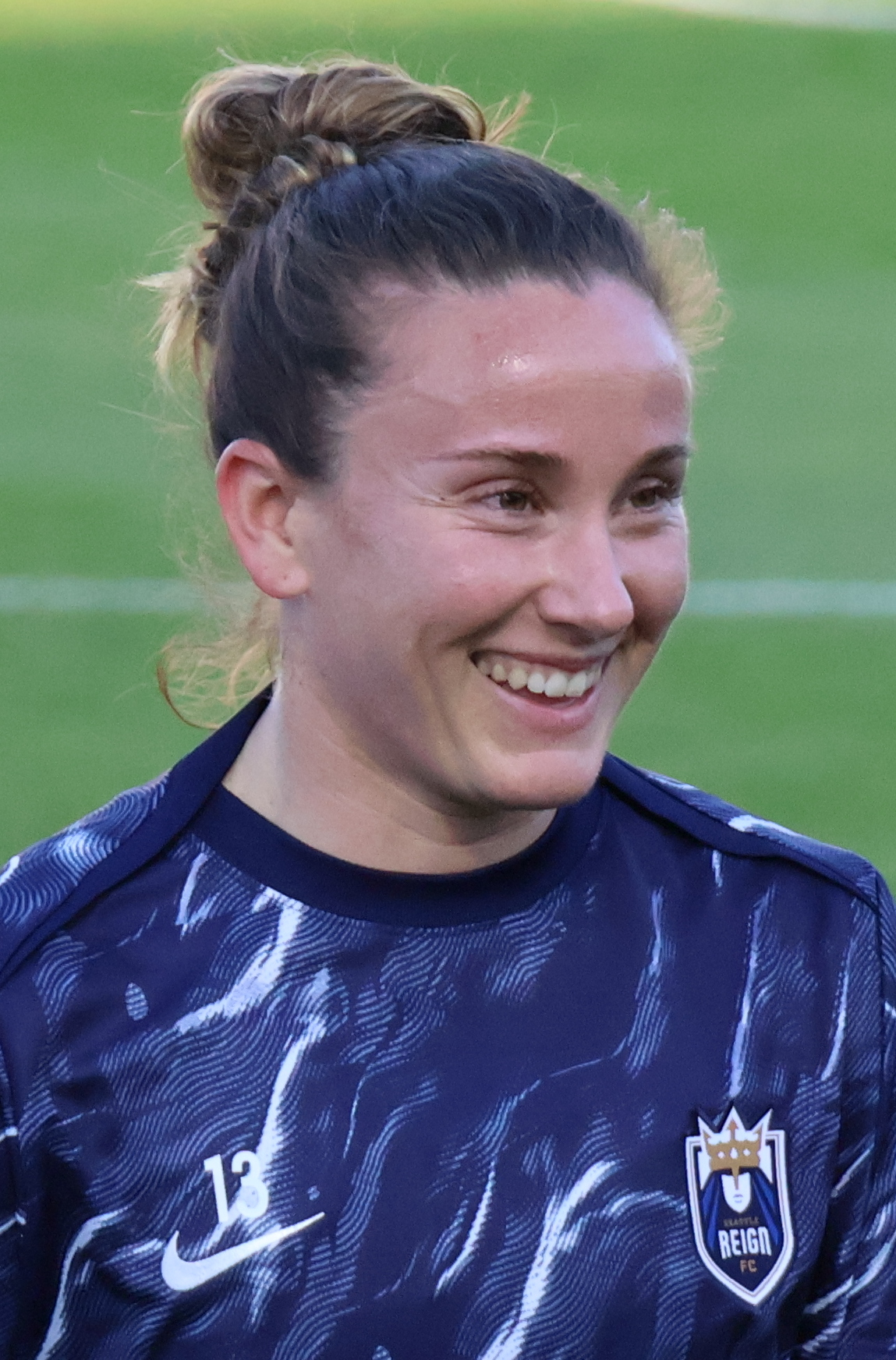
- Lester with the Seattle Reign in 2025

Personal information
- Full name: Julia Nicole Lester
- Date of birth: January 16, 1998 (age 28)
- Place of birth: Tampa, Florida, U.S.
- Height: 5 ft 4 in (1.63 m)
- Position: Defender

Youth career
- Tampa Bay United

College career
Years	Team	Apps	(Gls)
2016–2019	Florida Gators	86	(3)

Senior career*
Years	Team	Apps	(Gls)
2020–2022	Apollon Ladies		
2022–2023	Racing Louisville	33	(0)
2024–	Seattle Reign	5	(0)
2025	→ Sporting JAX (loan)	14	(0)
2026	Sporting JAX	7	(0)
- * Club domestic league appearances and goals as of May 24, 2026

Julia Nicole Lester (born January 16, 1998) is an American professional soccer player who plays as a defender. She played college soccer for the Florida Gators before starting her professional career with Cypriot club Apollon Ladies. She has also previously played for Racing Louisville FC and Seattle Reign FC of the National Women's Soccer League, in addition to Sporting JAX of the USL Super League.

== College career ==
A family youth and community sciences major, Lester played for the Florida Gators from 2016 to 2019.

== Club career ==
After graduating from the University of Florida in August 2020, Lester signed for Cypriot club Apollon Ladies and played in the UEFA Women's Champions League. She was named to the league's Best XI in 2021 and captained the team.

In March 2022, Lester followed Apollon Ladies' former manager Kim Björkegren and signed for Racing Louisville of the American NWSL.

In January 2024, Lester was traded to fellow NWSL club Seattle Reign. She subsequently extended her contract with the Reign until 2025.

On July 9, 2025, Lester returned to her home state of Florida on a loan to USL Super League team Sporting JAX through the end of 2025. This move marked a reunion, as she rejoined her former college teammate Parker Roberts and her collegiate coaches, Becky Burleigh and Alan Kirkup. At the end of September, Lester was named to the USL Super League Team of the Month as a bench player. After starting all 14 of Sporting JAX's games and leading the team in minutes, she joined the club on a permanent deal in January 2026. At the end of Sporting JAX's inaugural season, Lester departed from the club.

== Career statistics ==
=== Club ===
As of match played May 24, 2026

Club	Season	Division	League		Cup		Playoffs		Total	
Club	Season	Division	Apps	Goals	Apps	Goals	Apps	Goals	Apps	Goals
Apollon Ladies F.C.	2020–2021	Cypriot First Division	0	0	2	0	—		2	0
Apollon Ladies F.C.	2021–2022	Cypriot First Division	0	0	4	0	—		4	0
Apollon Ladies F.C.	Total		0	0	6	0	0	0	6	0
Racing Louisville FC	2022	NWSL	20	0	5	0	—		25	0
Racing Louisville FC	2023	NWSL	13	0	5	0	—		18	0
Racing Louisville FC	Total		33	0	10	0	0	0	43	0
Seattle Reign FC	2024	NWSL	5	0	0	0	—		5	0
Sporting JAX	2025–26	USL Super League	21	0	—		0	0	21	0
Career total			59	0	16	0	0	0	75	0

* Apollon Ladies stats reflect ≥ 6 league/Champions League appearances based on available data.
