= Sophie Jones (American soccer) =

American soccer player (born 2001)

Personal information
- Full name: Sophia Grace Jones
- Date of birth: July 17, 2001 (age 25)
- Place of birth: San Francisco, California, USA
- Height: 5 ft 5 in (1.65 m)
- Position: Midfielder

Team information
- Current team: Sporting JAX
- Number: 8

Youth career
- 2015–2016: De Anza Force
- 2017–2018: San Jose Earthquakes

College career
| Years | Team | Apps | (Gls) |
| 2019–2022 | Duke Blue Devils | 75 | (5) |

Senior career*
| Years | Team | Apps | (Gls) |
| 2023–2024 | Chicago Red Stars | 0 | (0) |
| 2025– | Sporting JAX | 40 | (0) |

International career
| 2017–2018 | United States U-17 | 17 | (1) |
| 2019 | United States U-20 | 3 | (0) |
- * Club domestic league appearances and goals as of November 15, 2026

Sophia Grace Jones (born July 17, 2001) is an American professional soccer player who plays as a midfielder for USL Super League club Sporting JAX. She played college soccer for the Duke Blue Devils and was drafted by the Chicago Red Stars in the fourth round of the 2023 NWSL Draft. She was named the Gatorade National Player of the Year during high school in 2019. She played for the United States at the under-17 and under-20 levels, appearing at the 2018 FIFA U-17 Women's World Cup.

== Early life and college career ==
Jones was born in San Francisco, to Warren and Tina Jones, and has a twin brother. She played club soccer for De Anza Force before joining the San Jose Earthquakes, with which she was named the Youth Girls National Player of the Year by United Soccer Coaches in 2018. In 2019, she chose to play prep soccer instead of club during her senior year at Menlo School in Atherton, California. She scored 18 goals and added 16 assists, leading Menlo to the CIF Central Coast Section Division I title, and was named the Gatorade National Player of the Year. She was ranked by TopDrawerSoccer as the second-best prospect of the 2019 class.

=== Duke Blue Devils ===
Jones started 10 games for the Duke Blue Devils as a freshman in 2019, earning Atlantic Coast Conference all-freshman honors, before tearing her ACL and missing the rest of the season. She started all 21 games in her sophomore season in 2020, scoring 3 goals with 3 assists, and was named first-team All-ACC and third-team All-American by United Soccer Coaches. In the NCAA tournament, she scored a golden goal in a 2–1 win against Arizona State as Duke reached the national quarterfinals, losing to Florida State on penalties. She started all 21 games as a junior in 2021, featuring primarily in defense, and was named second-team All-ACC as Duke again reached the quarterfinals of the NCAA tournament. She started all 23 games as a midfielder in her senior season in 2022, scoring 2 goals with 3 assists, as Duke made another quarterfinal run at the NCAA tournament. She was named second-team All-ACC, second-team United Soccer Coaches All-American, and first-team TopDrawerSoccer Best XI at the end of the 2022 season.

== Club career ==
=== Chicago Red Stars ===
Jones was selected 43rd overall by the Chicago Red Stars in the fourth round of the 2023 NWSL Draft and was signed to a two-year contract. She debuted in a friendly against the Mexico national team on April 8, 2024. She made her NWSL debut on May 31, starting in a 2–0 loss to Racing Louisville in the group stage of the NWSL Challenge Cup, and appeared in two further games in the Challenge Cup. She was unused during the 2023 regular season as the Red Stars finished bottom of the league standings.

Jones made only one appearance during the 2024 season, playing stoppage-time minutes in a 3–2 win against the Washington Spirit in the NWSL x Liga MX Femenil Summer Cup, and was not re-signed by Chicago after the season.

=== Sporting JAX ===
On July 1, 2025, new USL Super League club Sporting JAX announced that the team had signed Jones for its inaugural season. On July 22, ahead of their first closed-door scrimmage against the Orlando Pride of the NWSL, head coach Stacey Balaam announced that Jones had been named team captain, with Parker Roberts serving as vice-captain.

== International career ==
Jones was first called up to the United States youth national team at the under-15 level. She played extensively for the under-17 team, making 17 appearances at that level. She started four of five games at the 2018 CONCACAF Women's U-17 Championship, including the 3–2 final win against Mexico. She started all three games at the 2018 FIFA U-17 Women's World Cup, where the United States finished bottom of their group. She later played friendlies for the under-20 team in 2019, and was called up to the under-23 team to scrimmage against NWSL competition in the 2022 preseason.

== Career statistics ==
=== College ===
As of match played November 25, 2022

| Season | Games | | Scoring | | | | |
| Season | GP | GS | G | A | PTS | SH | SOG |
Duke Blue Devils
| 2019 | 10 | 10 | 0 | 1 | 1 | 9 | 3 |
| 2020 | 21 | 21 | 3 | 3 | 9 | 23 | 9 |
| 2021 | 21 | 21 | 0 | 1 | 1 | 11 | 5 |
| 2022 | 23 | 23 | 2 | 3 | 7 | 9 | 7 |
Career
| Career total | 75 | 75 | 5 | 8 | 18 | 52 | 24 |

=== Professional ===
As of match played November 15, 2026

| Club | Season | League | | | Cup | | Playoffs | | Total | |
| Club | Season | Division | Apps | Goals | Apps | Goals | Apps | Goals | Apps | Goals |
|---|---|---|---|---|---|---|---|---|---|---|
| Chicago Red Stars | 2023 | (United States) NWSL | 0 | 0 | 3 | 0 | — | | 3 | 0 |
| Chicago Red Stars | 2024 | (United States) NWSL | 0 | 0 | 1 | 0 | — | | 1 | 0 |
| Sporting JAX | 2025–26 | (United States) USLS | 28 | 0 | 0 | 0 | 1 | 0 | 29 | 0 |
| Sporting JAX | 2026 | (United States) USLS | 12 | 0 | — | | — | | 12 | 0 |
| Career total | | | 40 | 0 | 4 | 0 | 1 | 0 | 45 | 0 |

* “Cup” includes the NWSL Challenge Cup (2023) and NWSL × Liga MX Femenil Summer Cup (2024).

== Honors and awards ==
Individual

- USL Super League All-League Second Team: 2025–26
- Second-team All-American: 2022
- Third-team All-American: 2020
- First-team All-ACC: 2020
- Second-team All-ACC: 2021, 2022
- ACC all-freshman team: 2019
