= Parker Roberts =

American soccer player (born 1997)

Personal information
- Full name: Parker Annabel Roberts
- Date of birth: July 30, 1997 (age 29)
- Place of birth: Leawood, Kansas, U.S.
- Height: 5 ft 6 in (1.68 m)
- Position: Midfielder

Team information
- Current team: Sporting JAX
- Number: 22

Youth career
- 2010–2016: KC Metro Dynamos

College career
| Years | Team | Apps | (Gls) |
| 2015 | Kansas Jayhawks | 20 | (3) |
| 2016–2021 | Florida Gators | 67 | (13) |

Senior career*
| Years | Team | Apps | (Gls) |
| 2021–2022 | Orlando Pride | 3 | (0) |
| 2025– | Sporting JAX | 9 | (0) |

International career^{‡}
| 2014–2016 | United States U20 | | |
| 2017–2018 | United States U23 | | |
- * Club domestic league appearances and goals as of May 24, 2026 ‡ National team caps and goals as of August 13, 2018

Parker Annabel Roberts (born July 30, 1997) is an American professional soccer player who plays as a midfielder for Sporting JAX of the USL Super League.

== Early life ==
Born in Leawood, Kansas, Roberts prepped at Blue Valley North High School and was named Kansas Gatorade State Girls Soccer Player of the Year twice, in 2014 and 2015. She also set a school record for career goals with 55. Roberts played six years of club soccer for KC Metro Dynamos, which reached US Youth Soccer (USYS) National Championships in both 2014 and 2015. KC Metro Dynamo won the Kansas State Cup Championship in five of her six years with club. From 2013, Roberts was also a three-year member of Region II Olympic Development Program (ODP) team.

=== College ===
Roberts played five seasons of college soccer, first at the University of Kansas in 2015 before transferring to the University of Florida to play for the Florida Gators between 2016 and 2021 while studying for bachelor's degrees in sociology and criminology and a master's in management. Originally committing to the University of Miami, Roberts ultimately played her freshman year with the Kansas Jayhawks. She started 19 of 20 appearances, scoring three goals (all game-winners) and one assist, and was named to the 2015 Big 12 All-Freshman team at the end of the season. Having transferred to UF, Roberts redshirted in 2016 due to United States under-20 commitments in preparation for the 2016 FIFA U-20 Women's World Cup. As a redshirt sophomore in 2017, Roberts started every match of the season and was an All-SEC first-team selection. In 2018 she was named co-captain and started all six games before suffering a Jones fracture on September 7, ending her season. She returned in 2019 and once again started every match on the way to her second All-SEC first-team selection and also earned United Soccer Coaches All-Southeast Region first-team honors having scored a career-high five goals and was second among Gators with 15 points. Having received an additional year of eligibility for medical hardship during the 2018 season, Roberts returned for the rescheduled 2020–21 season in light of the COVID-19 pandemic. She led the Gators with 15 points and finished up as an All-SEC second-team selection before graduating with her master's in May 2021.

== Club career ==
=== Orlando Pride ===
On August 26, 2021, Roberts signed for NWSL team Orlando Pride through the remainder of the 2021 season after Orlando traded a fourth-round 2022 NWSL Draft pick to Kansas City NWSL for her discovery rights. The move reunited her with former-Gators coach Becky Burleigh who had been appointed Orlando's interim head coach in July. She made her professional debut on September 11, 2021, as a stoppage time substitute for Marta in a 3–1 win over Racing Louisville FC. Roberts was waived at the end of the 2022 season having made six appearances for the club.

=== Sporting JAX ===
On June 3, 2025, Sporting JAX, of the USL Super League, announced they had signed Roberts to their inaugural roster. Signing with Sporting JAX once again reunited her with Becky Burleigh. On July 22, ahead of their first closed-door scrimmage against the Orlando Pride of the NWSL, head coach Stacey Balaam announced that Roberts had been named team vice-captain, with Sophie Jones serving as captain.

In mid-August 2025, Roberts sustained a right ACL injury, ruling her out for most of the season. In an interview, she stated that she hopes to return to play later in the season.

== International career ==
Roberts started representing the United States at under-20 level in 2014. In 2015 she was called up for the Four Nations Tournament and 10 Nations Tournament. She started in four of the five games at the 2015 CONCACAF Women's U-20 Championship including the final as the US beat Canada. The result also qualified the team for the 2016 FIFA U-20 Women's World Cup. Roberts was named to the final roster, traveling with the team to Papua New Guinea. She appeared in two group games against France and Ghana as the team reached the semi-finals. In 2017 and 2018, Roberts was called up to multiple under-23 squads.

== Personal life ==
Roberts has two older siblings: Nathan and Ferriss. Her sister, Ferriss, played soccer at UNC Asheville from 2010 to 2013. Her brother, Nathan, also attended KU. Her great-grandfather, Clay Roberts Sr., was in the KU class of 1913 and wrestled for the Jayhawks while her great-uncle, Clay "Bud" Roberts Jr., was in the KU class of 1953 and played football for the Jayhawks. Roberts' great-uncle, David "Boo" Ferriss, is member of the Boston Red Sox Hall of Fame and Mississippi Sports Hall of Fame.

== Career statistics ==
=== College statistics ===
| Season | Games | | Scoring | | | | |
| Season | GP | GS | G | A | PTS | SH | SOG |
Kansas Jayhawks
| 2015 | 20 | 19 | 3 | 1 | 7 | 41 | 20 |
Florida Gators
| 2016 | 3 | 0 | 0 | 0 | 0 | 0 | 0 |
| 2017 | 24 | 24 | 3 | 1 | 7 | 20 | 9 |
| 2018 | 6 | 6 | 0 | 0 | 0 | 2 | 1 |
| 2019 | 21 | 21 | 5 | 5 | 15 | 28 | 12 |
| 2020–2021 | 16 | 16 | 5 | 5 | 15 | 26 | 14 |
Career
| Career total | 90 | 86 | 16 | 12 | 44 | 117 | 56 |

=== Club ===
As of match played October 16, 2026

| Club | Season | League | | | Cup | | Playoffs | | Total | |
| Club | Season | Division | Apps | Goals | Apps | Goals | Apps | Goals | Apps | Goals |
|---|---|---|---|---|---|---|---|---|---|---|
| Orlando Pride | 2021 | (United States) NWSL | 2 | 0 | 0 | 0 | — | | 2 | 0 |
| Orlando Pride | 2022 | (United States) NWSL | 1 | 0 | 3 | 0 | — | | 4 | 0 |
| Sporting JAX | 2025–26 | (United States) USLS | 8 | 0 | 0 | 0 | 1 | 0 | 9 | 0 |
| Sporting JAX | 2026 | (United States) USLS | 1 | 0 | — | | — | | 1 | 0 |
| Career total | | | 12 | 0 | 3 | 0 | 1 | 0 | 16 | 0 |

== Honors ==
=== International ===
- CONCACAF Women's U-20 Championship: 2015

=== Individual ===
- Kansas Gatorade State Girls Soccer Player of the Year: 2014, 2015
