= Mya Swinton =

American soccer player (born 2001)

Personal information
- Full name: Mya Alesha Swinton
- Date of birth: December 23, 2001 (age 24)
- Place of birth: Okinawa Prefecture, Japan
- Height: 5 ft 2 in (1.57 m)
- Position: Winger

Team information
- Current team: Sporting JAX
- Number: 21

Youth career
- Gulf Coast Texans

College career
Years	Team	Apps	(Gls)
2020–2021	Vanderbilt Commodores	14	(0)
2022–2025	West Florida Argonauts	77	(30)

Senior career*
Years	Team	Apps	(Gls)
2026–	Sporting JAX	5	(0)
- * Club domestic league appearances and goals as of 08:00, November 15, 2026 (UTC)

Mya Alesha Swinton (born December 23, 2001) is an American professional soccer player who plays as a winger for USL Super League club Sporting JAX. She played college soccer for the Vanderbilt Commodores and the West Florida Argonauts.

== Early life ==
Swinton was born in Okinawa Prefecture, Japan, to Seiko Swinton and United States Navy employee Thomas Swinton. The family soon moved to San Diego, California, where Swinton's father was stationed at Naval Base San Diego. Swinton began playing soccer at the age of eight. In the summer of 2017, the family moved once again after Swinton's father was transferred to Naval Air Station Pensacola in Florida. Swinton spent the remainder of her teenage years in Gulf Breeze, Florida.

Swinton played youth club soccer for the Gulf Coast Texans, where she contributed to the 2019 Florida State Cup title and a WPSL final appearance. She played prep soccer at Gulf Breeze High School, where she was a two-time team captain. She helped Gulf Breeze reach two state finals, win two regional championships, and claim three district championships. In her junior year, she was named the area's most valuable player. Swinton also spent part of her high school career playing alongside her older sister, Aila, who went on to play college soccer at Kennesaw State and Louisiana.

== College career ==
=== Vanderbilt Commodores ===
Originally, Swinton verbally committed to play college soccer at the University of Washington. She later changed courses and joined the Vanderbilt Commodores for her freshman year. In her first collegiate season, which was split across 2020 and 2021 due to the COVID-19 pandemic, she made 16 appearances, coming on as a substitute in all but two. She made one goal contribution, an assist to Haley Hopkins' 88th-minute game-winner against Georgia on October 25, 2020.

After the season concluded, Swinton returned to the Pensacola area, where she worked two jobs while taking college courses on the side. She considered quitting soccer permanently, but later reconsidered and entered the NCAA transfer portal in early 2022.

=== West Florida Argonauts ===
Swinton soon joined the West Florida Argonauts in the NCAA Division II, kicking off her second collegiate stint in 2022 after redshirting the 2021 fall season. In her first year with the Argonauts, she recorded 6 assists and 5 goals, including 2 goals in the NCAA tournament. The following season, Swinton was named first-team All-Gulf South and first-team all-region, two honors that she would go on to claim in each of her remaining two years as well. Her performances, which included 19 consecutive starts and a team-leading 9 goals, also earned her the honor of 2023 Gulf South Offensive Player of the Year.

In 2024, Swinton scored a career-high 11 goals and ended the season as an NCAA Division II first-team All-American. She was also named the Gulf South Offensive Player of the Year for a second consecutive season, and named the regional Player of the Year as well. Swinton then spent one final season at West Florida. She captained the side to its second Gulf South tournament title in two years and was named the tournament's MVP. The United Soccer Coaches recognized Swinton as a 2025 third-team All-American. Swinton departed from West Florida having scored 30 times in 70 appearances, and having contributed to a Gulf South regular season title in each of her four years.

== Club career ==
On July 15, 2026, Swinton was announced to have signed her first professional contract with USL Super League team Sporting Club Jacksonville. She made her pro debut on August 16, making a substitute appearance in Sporting JAX's season-opening victory over Fort Lauderdale United.

== Career statistics ==
=== College ===
As of match played November 23, 2025

Season	Games		Scoring				
Season	GP	GS	G	A	PTS	SH	SOG
Vanderbilt Commodores
2020–21	14	0	0	1	1	2	0
West Florida Argonauts
2022	16	12	5	6	16	29	12
2023	19	19	9	5	23	62	29
2024	23	22	12	10	34	62	38
2025	20	20	5	3	13	59	26
Career
Career total	92	73	31	25	87	214	105

=== Professional ===
As of match played November 15, 2026

Club	Season	League			Cup		Playoffs		Total	
Club	Season	Division	Apps	Goals	Apps	Goals	Apps	Goals	Apps	Goals
Sporting JAX	2026	(United States) USLS	5	0	—		—		5	0
Career total			5	0	—		—		5	0

== Honors and awards ==
West Florida Argonauts

- Gulf South Conference: 2022, 2023, 2024, 2025
- Gulf South women's soccer tournament: 2024, 2025

Individual

- NCAA Division II first-team All-American: 2024
- NCAA Division II third-team All-American: 2025
- First-team All-Gulf South: 2023, 2024, 2025
- Gulf South Conference Offensive Player of the Year: 2023, 2024
- Gulf South tournament all-tournament team: 2025
- Gulf South tournament MVP: 2025
