= 2025 Sun Belt Conference women's soccer tournament =

- Classification: Division I
- Teams: 8
- Matches: 7
- Attendance: 749
- Site: Foley Sports Complex; Foley, Alabama
- Champions: Texas State (1st title)
- Winning coach: Steve Holeman (1st title)
- MVP: Victoria Meza (Texas State)
- Broadcast: ESPN+

2025 Sun Belt Conference women's soccer standings
	Conf.						Overall
Team	W		L		T	PCT	W		L		T	PCT
East
Old Dominion ‍†‍‍	6	–	1	–	3	.750	11	–	3	–	4	.722
James Madison ‍‍‍	5	–	2	–	3	.650	9	–	4	–	6	.632
Marshall ‍‍‍	4	–	2	–	4	.600	8	–	5	–	4	.588
Georgia State ‍‍‍	5	–	4	–	1	.550	9	–	8	–	2	.526
Appalachian State ‍‍‍	3	–	4	–	3	.450	7	–	7	–	3	.500
Coastal Carolina ‍‍‍	0	–	2	–	8	.400	3	–	5	–	8	.438
Georgia Southern ‍‍‍	0	–	5	–	5	.250	2	–	10	–	6	.278
West
UL Monroe ‍‍‍	6	–	0	–	4	.800	13	–	3	–	4	.750
South Alabama ‍†‍‍	6	–	1	–	3	.750	10	–	4	–	4	.667
Texas State ‍‍‡‍^{y}	5	–	1	–	4	.700	10	–	4	–	7	.643
Louisiana ‍‍‍	4	–	3	–	3	.550	7	–	6	–	5	.528
Arkansas State ‍‍‍	2	–	6	–	2	.300	4	–	7	–	4	.400
Troy ‍‍‍	0	–	7	–	3	.150	5	–	9	–	3	.382
Southern Miss ‍‍‍	1	–	9	–	0	.100	2	–	14	–	1	.147
† – Conference champion ‡ – 2025 Sun Belt Tournament champion y – Invited to the NCAA Tournament; As of December 9, 2025; Rankings from United Soccer Coaches Poll; Source:Sun Belt

The 2025 Sun Belt Conference women's soccer tournament was the postseason women's soccer tournament for the Sun Belt Conference held from November 3 to November 8, 2025. The seven-match tournament took place at the Foley Sports Complex in Foley, Alabama. The eight-team single-elimination tournament consisted of four rounds based on seeding from regular season conference play. The defending champions were the James Madison Dukes. James Madison was the fifth seed in the tournament and were unsuccessful at defending their title. They were defeated in a penalty shoot-out by Texas State in the Quarterfinals. Texas State would go on to win the Final 1–0 over ULM. This was the first Sun Belt women's soccer tournament title for the Texas State women's soccer program, and first for head coach Steve Holeman. It is Texas States's fifth overall women's soccer title as they won four titles in the Southland before moving to the Sun Belt Conference. As tournament champions, Texas State earned the Sun Belt's automatic berth into the 2025 NCAA Division I women's soccer tournament.

== Seeding ==
The top eight of the fourteen Sun Belt Conference teams from the regular season qualified for the 2025 Tournament. Seeding was based on regular season records of each team. The two division winners were awarded the top two seeds in the tournament. Old Dominion won the East Division with 12 division points. South Alabama and ULM finished tied for first place in the West Division with fourteen points each. ULM and South Alabama tied their regular season match-up on October 2. The second tiebreaker was goal difference against common division opponents. This was won by South Alabama and they were the West Division Champions. This left ULM, who had the most regular season conference points, 22, to be the third seed. Old Dominion and South Alabama both finished with 21 regular season conference points and needed at tiebreaker to determine the first and second seeds. The two teams did not play during regular season conference play. In determining overall seed, goal difference from conference matches versus common opponents was the tiebreaker. South Alabama prevailed and earned the first seed, while Old Dominion was the second. Georgia State and Marshall both finished with sixteen conference regular season points, and a tiebreaker was required to determine the sixth and seventh seeds. Georgia State defeated Marshall in West Virginia on September 21 during the regular season 3–2. Therefore, Georgia State was the sixth seed and Marshall was the seventh.

Seed	School	Conference Record	Points
1	South Alabama*	6–1–3	21*
2	Old Dominion*	6–1–3	21*
3	ULM	6–0–4	22
4	Texas State	5–1–4	19
5	James Madison	5–2–3	18
6	Marshall	4–2–4	16
7	Georgia State	5–4–1	16
8	Louisiana	4–3–3	15

(*: division winners are automatically given the top two seeds).

== Bracket ==
Quarterfinals; Monday, November 3
1	South Alabama (pen.)	0 (4)
8	Louisiana	0 (3)
4	Texas State (pen.)	1 (5)
5	James Madison	1 (4)
3	ULM	1
6	Marshall	0
2	Old Dominion	4
7	Georgia State	0

Semifinals; Wednesday, November 5
1	South Alabama	0
4	Texas State	1
2	Old Dominion	2
3	ULM	3

Championship; Saturday, November 8
4	Texas State	1
3	ULM	0

== Schedule ==
=== Quarterfinals ===
November 3	(3) ULM	1–0	(6) Marshall	Foley, AL
11:00 a.m. CST	Ava Goodman (yellow card) 15', (goal) 23'; Janne Van Brummelen (yellow card) 66'; Ines De Lope Casanova (yellow card) 84'	Report	(yellow card) 59' Fernanda Dantas; (red card) 90' Team	Stadium: Foley Sports Complex; Attendance: 75; Referee: Lila Remache; Assistant referees: Josh Hinkle; Ethan Wilson; Fourth official: Celeste Roberts

November 3	(2) Old Dominion	4–0	(7) Georgia State	Foley, AL
1:30 p.m. CST	Andrea Balcazar Algarin (yellow card) 11'; Yuliia Khrystiuk 15'; Gry Boe Thrysoe 43'; Brooke Edwards 52'; Riley Mullen (yellow card) 86'; Laura Klebek 87'	Report	(yellow card) 74' Emily Glenn	Stadium: Foley Sports Complex; Attendance: 100; Referee: Laadi Issaka; Assistant referees: Xiana Ping-Abas; Esmeralda Figureoa; Fourth official: Dorian DelToro Urueta

November 3	(1) South Alabama	0–0 (a.e.t.) (4–3 p)	(8) Louisiana	Foley, AL
4:30 p.m. CST	Team (yellow card) 90'; MacKenzie Meyerer (yellow card) 97'	Report	(yellow card) 53' Addison Soehn; (red card) 60' Natalie Mayes; (yellow card) 69' Salma Elhaimer	Stadium: Foley Sports Complex; Attendance: 125; Referee: Celeste Roberts; Assistant referees: Ethan Wilson; Hunter Kilgore; Fourth official: Uwe Tittl
	Penalties
	Sofia Ferrante (penalty scored); Ava Matherne (penalty missed); Amelia Campanella (penalty missed); Melina Descary (penalty scored); Mae Hunt (penalty scored); Andrea Iljkic (penalty scored)		(penalty scored) Miku Kurihara; (penalty scored) Addison Soehn; (penalty scored) Aila Swinton; (penalty missed) Salma Elhaimer; (penalty missed) Sisley Stephens; (penalty missed) Carson Glenn

November 3	(4) Texas State	1–1 (a.e.t.) (5–4 p)	(5) James Madison	Foley, AL
7:00 p.m. CST	Victoria Meza 33'; Angela Gatto (yellow card) 56'	Report	(yellow card) 61' Ginny Lackey; 73' Audrey Orrock	Stadium: Foley Sports Complex; Attendance: 53; Referee: Aaron Hernandez; Assistant referees: Ryan Campbell; Esmeralda Figueroa; Fourth official: Laadi Issaka
	Penalties
	Victoria Meza (penalty scored); Katrin Agustsdottir (penalty scored); Jenny Ngankem (penalty scored); Angela Gatto (penalty scored); Constance Agyemang (penalty scored)		(penalty scored) Tali Rovner; (penalty scored) Roos Valk; (penalty scored) Jeanette Fieldsend; (penalty scored) Ginny Lacke; (penalty missed) Ellie Farrell

=== Semifinals ===
November 5	(2) Old Dominion	2–3	(3) ULM	Foley, AL
4:00 p.m. CST	Hannah Morgan 70'; Ashley Economopoulos 88'	Report	18', 22' Skylar Blaise; 30' Old Dominion Own Goal; (yellow card) 69' Jaden Masters; (yellow card) 78' Janne Van Brummelen; (yellow card) 80' Jen Handy	Stadium: Foley Sports Complex; Attendance: 51; Referee: Samantha Martinez; Assistant referees: Ethan Wilson; Esmeralda Figueroa; Fourth official: Celeste Roberts

November 5	(1) South Alabama	0–1	(4) Texas State	Foley, AL
7:00 p.m. CST		Report	60' Kennley Bradley; (yellow card) 86' Alexis Montgomery	Stadium: Foley Sports Complex; Attendance: 125; Referee: Mario Maric; Assistant referees: Laadi Issaka; Xiana Pang-Abas; Fourth official: Uwe Tittl

=== Final ===
November 8	(3) ULM	0–1	(4) Texas State	Foley, AL
7:00 p.m. CST	Sophia Youngman (yellow card) 20'; Giulia Franco (yellow card) 22'; Ally Richardson (yellow card) 49'	Report	54' Sadie Guzman	Stadium: Foley Sports Complex; Attendance: 220; Referee: Noah Matos; Assistant referees: Celeste Roberts; Esmeralda Figueroa; Fourth official: Uwe Tittl

== Statistics ==
=== Goalscorers ===
There were 14 goals scored in 7 matches, for an average of 2 goals per match (as of November 8, 2025).

2 goals

- Skylar Blaise – ULM

1 goal

- Audrey Orrock – James Madison
- Ashley Economopoulos – Old Dominion
- Brooke Edwards – Old Dominion
- Yuliia Khrystiuk – Old Dominion
- Laura Klebek – Old Dominion
- Hannah Morgan – Old Dominion
- Gry Boe Thrysoe – Old Dominion
- Kennley Bradley – Texas State
- Sadie Guzman – Texas State
- Victoria Meza – Texas State
- Ava Goodman – ULM

1 own goal

- Old Dominion (vs ULM)

== All-Tournament team ==
Player	Team
Riley Mullen	Old Dominion
Gry Boe Thrysoe	Old Dominion
Melina Descary	South Alabama
Bonnie Frost	South Alabama
Helen Alormenu	Texas State
Kennley Bradley	Texas State
Chloe Jones	Texas State
**Victoria Meza**	Texas State
Maude Rouanet	Texas State
Skylar Blaise	ULM
Ava Goodman	ULM
Ally Richardson	ULM

MVP in bold
