= Alan Kirkup =

English footballer and coach (born 1956)

Personal information
- Full name: Alan Kirkup
- Date of birth: 13 November 1956 (age 69)
- Place of birth: Bedford, England
- Height: 1.79 m (5 ft 10 in)
- Position: Defender

Senior career*
Years	Team	Apps	(Gls)
1972–1976	Manchester United	0	(0)

Managerial career
- 1981–1982: Eastern Illinois (graduate assistant)
- 1985–1988: SMU (men's assistant)
- 1986–1995: SMU (women)
- 1996–1998: Maryland
- 1999–2003: Arkansas
- 2006–2021: Florida (assistant/associate)
- 2021: Orlando Pride (assistant)
- 2022–2024: Lexington SC (USLW)
- 2025–: Sporting JAX (associate)
- * Club domestic league appearances and goals

Alan Kirkup (born 13 November 1956) is an English-born soccer coach and former player. He is the current associate head coach for Sporting Club Jacksonville of the USL Super League.

He played four seasons for Manchester United before transitioning to a coaching career in the United States, where he has served as both a head coach and assistant coach for multiple NCAA women's soccer programs. Kirkup is recognized as the first coach in SMU Mustangs women's soccer history and accumulating 225 NCAA wins over his career.

== Early life and playing career ==
Kirkup grew up in Bedford, England and played professionally as a defender for Manchester United from 1972 to 1976. After retiring as a player, he graduated from Loughborough University in Loughborough, England with a degree in physical education and sports science in 1981.

== Collegiate coaching career ==
=== Eastern Illinois Panthers ===
In 1981, he moved abroad to Eastern Illinois University in Charleston, where he earned a master’s degree in physical education in 1982.

While studying, Kirkup began his coaching career as a graduate assistant with the Eastern Illinois Panthers men's soccer team from 1981 to 1982.

=== SMU Mustangs ===
He then served as an assistant coach for the SMU Mustangs men's soccer program from 1985 to 1988.

In 1986, Kirkup was hired to be the SMU women's soccer coach. He led the team for ten seasons, building the program from its inception. Under his guidance, SMU compiled a 149–52–7 record, highlighted by a 23–1–1 season in 1995, when the team won both the Southwest Conference regular season and tournament championships and reached the NCAA Final Four.

=== Maryland Terrapins ===
Kirkup then took over as the head coach of the Maryland Terrapins women's soccer team from 1996 to 1998. During his tenure, Maryland reached the NCAA quarterfinals in 1996 and were Atlantic Coast Conference (ACC) runners-up in 1997. He finished his time there with a 42–25–6 record.

=== Arkansas Razorbacks ===
From 1999 to 2003, he served as head coach of the Arkansas Razorbacks women's soccer team, compiling a 34–59–6 record and helping to guide the program through a competitive period in the Southeastern Conference (SEC). He resigned in 2004.

=== Florida Gators ===
Following his resignation from Arkansas, Kirkup returned to England, where he worked as a physical education and sports teacher at the Buckingham School and Taunton's College in Southampton. He also coached at the Southampton FC Academy.

In early 2006, he was offered a position at the University of Florida by coach Becky Burleigh. At first, he was hesitant: “I was happy with what I was doing at the time back home,” he recalled. However, after visiting UF in February, he found the opportunity appealing: “February in England is miserably cold… So that was the bait that caught me. Burleigh explained what I would be doing and I was sold.”

That June, Kirkup was hired by Burleigh as an assistant coach to replace the outgoing Danielle Fotopoulos. He was promoted to associate head coach prior to the 2017 season.

== Professional and club roles ==
=== Orlando Pride ===
After retiring from collegiate coaching in 2021, Kirkup joined the Orlando Pride of the National Women’s Soccer League (NWSL) as an assistant coach under longtime colleague Becky Burleigh, who had been named interim head coach. Burleigh and Kirkup were hired after previous head coach Marc Skinner and assistant coach Carl Green announced their departures.

=== Lexington SC ===
In October 2022, Kirkup was appointed women’s technical director for Lexington SC in Kentucky, a newly formed organization preparing to launch a pre-professional women’s team. He also served as the head coach for the club's USL W League squad. He was with the club until 2024.

=== Sporting JAX ===
In 2025, Kirkup was named associate head coach for the Sporting Club Jacksonville women’s team of the USL Super League, serving under head coach Stacey Balaam. The appointment reunited him with former Florida Gators players and colleagues, among them Becky Burleigh.

== Head coaching record ==
=== NCAA ===
Record table
Season	Team	Overall	Conference	Standing	Postseason
SMU (Independent/Southwest Conference) (1986–1995)
1986	SMU	15–3–2	–	–	–
1987	SMU	18–3–1	–	–	–
1988	SMU	17–5–0	–	–	–
1989	SMU	14–4–0	–	–	–
1990	SMU	14–6–1	–	–	NCAA First Round
1991	SMU	10–8–0	–	–	–
1992	SMU	15–6–0	–	–	NCAA First Round
1993	SMU	13–7–1	–	–	NCAA First Round
1994	SMU	10–9–1	–	–	–
1995	SMU	23–1–1	5–0–0	SWC Regular Season and Tournament Champions	NCAA Final Four
SMU:		149–52–7 (.733)	5–0–0		
Maryland (Atlantic Coast Conference) (1996–1998)
1996	Maryland	19–5–2	2–3–2	–	NCAA Quarterfinals
1997	Maryland	12–9–3	4–3–0	ACC Runner-up	NCAA 1st round
1998	Maryland	11–11–1	3–4–0	–	NCAA 2nd round
Maryland:		42–25–6 (.616)	9–10–2		
Arkansas (Southeastern Conference) (1999–2003)
1999	Arkansas	7–12–0	4–5–0	–	–
2000	Arkansas	7–11–3	3–5–1	–	–
2001	Arkansas	6–14–0	2–7–0	–	–
2002	Arkansas	7–11–2	3–5–1	–	–
2003	Arkansas	7–11–1	3–6–0	–	–
Arkansas:		34–59–6 (.374)	15–28–2		
Total:		225–136–19 (.617)			
National champion Postseason invitational champion Conference regular season champion Conference regular season and conference tournament champion Division regular season champion Division regular season and conference tournament champion Conference tournament champion

=== Lexington SC ===
Statistics overview

Season	Team	Overall	Standing	Postseason
Lexington SC — USL W League (2024–2025)
2023	Lexington SC	3–6–1	3rd	Did not qualify
2024	Lexington SC	4–2–4	3rd	Did not qualify
Total:		7–8–5 (.475)		

== Coaching style and influence ==
Kirkup has been noted by colleagues for his tactical knowledge and ability to teach the game. Florida head coach Becky Burleigh described him as “one of the best tactical minds” she had encountered and credited his approach to player development as a key asset to the Gators program.

=== World Cup commentary ===
In 2010, Kirkup was featured in The Gainesville Sun speaking on his unique perspective as a native Englishman coaching in the United States. Ahead of a World Cup match between the United States and England, he described feeling torn between his country of birth and his adopted home, highlighting his insight into both soccer cultures. He was quoted as saying, "For me, it would probably be the best if the game ended in a draw. And I think the Americans would be happy with that as well."

== Honors and achievements ==
- First head coach of the SMU women’s soccer program: 1986–1995
- Southwest Conference Regular Season and Tournament Champions: 1995
- NCAA Final Four appearance: 1995 with SMU
- Ranked 16th on NCAA all-time wins list at the time of joining Florida in 2006

== Personal life ==
He is married to Anna; together, they have two children: Molly and Stephen. Stephen played lacrosse for the North Carolina Tar Heels
