= Mélina Descary =

Canadian soccer player (born 2004)

Personal information
- Full name: Mélina Descary
- Date of birth: 23 February 2004 (age 22)
- Place of birth: Greenfield Park, Quebec, Canada
- Height: 5 ft 7 in (1.70 m)
- Position: Midfielder

Team information
- Current team: Sporting JAX
- Number: 18

Youth career
- AS Brossard
- FC Laval

College career
Years	Team	Apps	(Gls)
2022	Florida State Seminoles	10	(0)
2023–2025	South Alabama Jaguars	56	(3)

Senior career*
Years	Team	Apps	(Gls)
2023	Eagle FC	–	(–)
2026–	Sporting JAX	11	(0)
- * Club domestic league appearances and goals as of 08:00, 15 November 2026 (UTC)

Mélina Descary (born 23 February 2004) is a Canadian professional soccer player who plays as a midfielder for USL Super League club Sporting JAX. She played college soccer in the United States for the Florida State Seminoles and the South Alabama Jaguars.

== Early life ==
Born in Greenfield Park, Quebec, Descary grew up in Candiac, a suburb of Montreal. She received a secondary school education at Mortagne High School in Boucherville. She also spent a short stint studying at Champlain College Saint-Lambert to complete the mandatory twelve years of education required for acceptance to a college in the United States. In October 2021, Descary was one of five denizens of her hometown to be inducted into the Order of Candiac.

Descary started playing soccer at the age of four and soon began to play with more advanced age groups. Descary eventually joined AS Brossard's AAA team, where she earned two annual club MVP awards and was named Brossard's 2020 Ballon d'Or recipient. In 2019, she helped Brossard win a league title and earn a silver medal at the national championships in Edmonton. She also trained at the Canada National High Performance Centre and spent two years with FC Laval.

== College career ==
=== Florida State Seminoles ===
Descary received various scholarship offers from colleges in the United States, including multiple full-ride scholarships. Although Florida State University could only cover 83% of Descary's tuition, Descary chose to assume the extra financial burden in order to play for the Seminoles. In her sole season at Florida State, she contributed to titles in the Atlantic Coast Conference regular season and the ACC women's soccer tournament, as well as a run to the NCAA tournament semifinals. A rotational player, she made 10 appearances, all of which were as a substitute. The Seminoles never lost a match that Descary participated in.

In the offseason leading up to her sophomore year of college, Descary played for Eagle FC of the pre-professional USL W League. She helped Eagle FC win the W League Eastern Conference championship and scored a goal in her team's trophy-clinching win over Morris Elite SC.

=== South Alabama Jaguars ===
Descary transferred to the University of South Alabama ahead of the 2023 season. She scored her first collegiate goal for the Jaguars on 20 August 2023, in an 8–0 victory over Alcorn State. She then scored again in the following match before only finding the back of the net once more before graduating. She finished her first year at South Alabama having made 19 appearances (17 starts). As a junior in 2024, she registered a career-high 1,499 minutes as a member of a Jaguar attack that ranked within the top five in the Sun Belt Conference in both goals and assists. Descary had her most successful year in 2025. A co-team captain, she earned spots on the All-Sun Belt third team, All-Southeast region second team, and the 2025 Sun Belt tournament team. She left South Alabama having made 56 total appearances.

== Club career ==
On 9 July 2026, USL Super League club Sporting JAX announced that they had signed Descary to her first professional contract ahead of the 2026 fall season. Descary made her pro debut on August 16, making a substitute appearance in Sporting JAX's season-opening victory over Fort Lauderdale United.

== International career ==
Descary has been a member of the Quebec under-14 and under-15 teams. She was selected to participate in multiple Canada under-17 national team camps in 2019, but never made the final squad.

== Career statistics ==
=== College ===
As of match played 5 November 2025

Season	Games		Scoring				
Season	GP	GS	G	A	PTS	SH	SOG
Florida State Seminoles
2022–23	10	0	0	0	0	3	2
South Alabama Jaguars
2023	19	17	2	0	4	20	7
2024	19	16	0	0	0	21	9
2025	18	17	1	1	3	9	4
Career
Career total	66	50	3	1	7	53	22

=== Professional ===
As of match played 15 November 2026

Club	Season	League			Cup		Playoffs		Total	
Club	Season	Division	Apps	Goals	Apps	Goals	Apps	Goals	Apps	Goals
Sporting JAX	2026	(United States) USLS	11	0	—		—		11	0
Career total			11	0	—		—		11	0

== Honors and awards ==
Florida State Seminoles

- ACC women's soccer tournament: 2022
- Atlantic Coast Conference: 2022

Individual

- Third-team All-Sun Belt: 2025
- Sun Belt Conference tournament all-tournament team: 2025
