= Grace Phillpotts =

American soccer player

Personal information
- Full name: Grace Debra Phillpotts
- Date of birth: October 1, 2002 (age 24)
- Height: 5 ft 5 in (1.65 m)
- Position: Defender

Team information
- Current team: Sporting JAX
- Number: 24

Youth career
- –2020: Michigan Hawks

College career
Years	Team	Apps	(Gls)
2020–2022	DePaul Blue Demons	39	(0)
2023–2024	Kentucky Wildcats	40	(1)

Senior career*
Years	Team	Apps	(Gls)
2020–2022	Detroit City	3	(0)
2025	Brooklyn FC	7	(1)
2025–	Sporting JAX	39	(0)
- * Club domestic league appearances and goals as of November 15, 2026

Grace Debra Phillpotts (born October 1, 2002) is an American professional soccer player who plays as a defender for Sporting JAX in the USL Super League. She played collegiate soccer at DePaul University and the University of Kentucky.

== Early life and youth career ==
Phillpotts attended Powers Catholic High School, where she was a standout soccer player, earning multiple accolades. She played club soccer for the Michigan Hawks, a prestigious team competing in the ECNL, the top youth soccer competition in the United States.

In 2017, Phillpotts was invited to the ECNL/id2 National Training Camp, a showcase for the country’s top female youth players. She also helped lead the Michigan Hawks to a third-place finish at the ECNL National Playoffs that year.

== College career ==
=== DePaul Blue Demons ===
Phillpotts began her collegiate career playing for the DePaul Blue Demons in Chicago. As a freshman in 2020, she started seven matches and earned a place on the Big East All-Freshman Team. Philpotts started all 18 matches in her sophomore year and made 12 starts as a junior.

During her tenure with the Blue Demons, Phillpotts recorded four assists. In September 2021, she was named Big East Defensive Player of the Week.

=== Kentucky Wildcats ===
Phillpotts transferred to the Kentucky Wildcats in 2023. She started all 19 matches she played that season, providing four assists and helping Kentucky achieve a 9–4–6 record.

She earned Second Team All-Southeastern Conference (SEC) honors and selection to the United Soccer Coaches (USC) Third Team All-Southeast Region. In her senior year, Phillpotts started all 21 matches, logging a career-high 1,799 minutes, and scoring her first collegiate goal. She matched her career-best with four assists, totaling six points for the season. Her senior season accolades included First Team All-SEC and USC Southeast Region First Team honors.

== Club career ==
=== Detroit City FC ===
In May 2020, Philpotts was named to first-ever women's side for Detroit City, competing in United Women's Soccer. Philipotts returned to Detroit City in 2021, earning Second-Team All-Conference honors, and then again in 2022 when she appeared in three matches.

=== Brooklyn FC ===
In January 2025, shortly after completing her collegiate eligibility, Phillpotts signed her first professional contract with Brooklyn FC, one of the founding teams of the USL Super League.

Phillpotts joined Brooklyn FC midway through the 2024–25 season. In total, she appeared in seven matches for Brooklyn FC, starting five and recording one goal with one assist in her professional debut.

=== Sporting JAX ===
On July 1, 2025, Sporting JAX, an expansion club in the USL Super League, announced they had signed Phillpotts to their inaugural roster.

She was named to the USL Super League Team of the Month for her contributions made during April 2026.

== Career statistics ==
=== College ===
Season	Games		Scoring				
Season	GP	GS	G	A	PTS	SH	SOG
DePaul Blue Demons
2020	6	6	0	1	1	3	2
2021	18	18	0	4	4	11	7
2022	16	12	0	4	4	6	4
Kentucky Wildcats
2023	19	19	0	4	4	20	6
2024	21	21	1	4	6	20	4
Career
Career total	80	76	1	17	19	60	23

=== Professional ===
As of November 15, 2026

Appearances and goals by club, season and competition
Club	Season	League			Cup		Playoffs (Note: Includes USL Super League playoffs)		Total	
Club	Season	Division	Apps	Goals	Apps	Goals	Apps	Goals	Apps	Goals
Brooklyn FC	2024–25	(United States) USLS	7	1	—		—		7	1
Sporting JAX	2025–26	(United States) USLS	27	0	—		1	0	28	0
Sporting JAX	2026	(United States) USLS	12	0	—		—		12	0
Career total			46	1	—		1	0	47	1

== Honors and awards ==
- USL Super League Team of the Month: April 2026
- USC Southeast Region First Team: 2024
- First Team All-SEC: 2024
- Second Team All-SEC: 2023
- USC Third Team All-Southeast Region: 2023
- Big East Defensive Player of the Week: September 2021
- Big East All-Freshman Team: 2020
