= Meg Hughes =

American soccer player (born 2002)

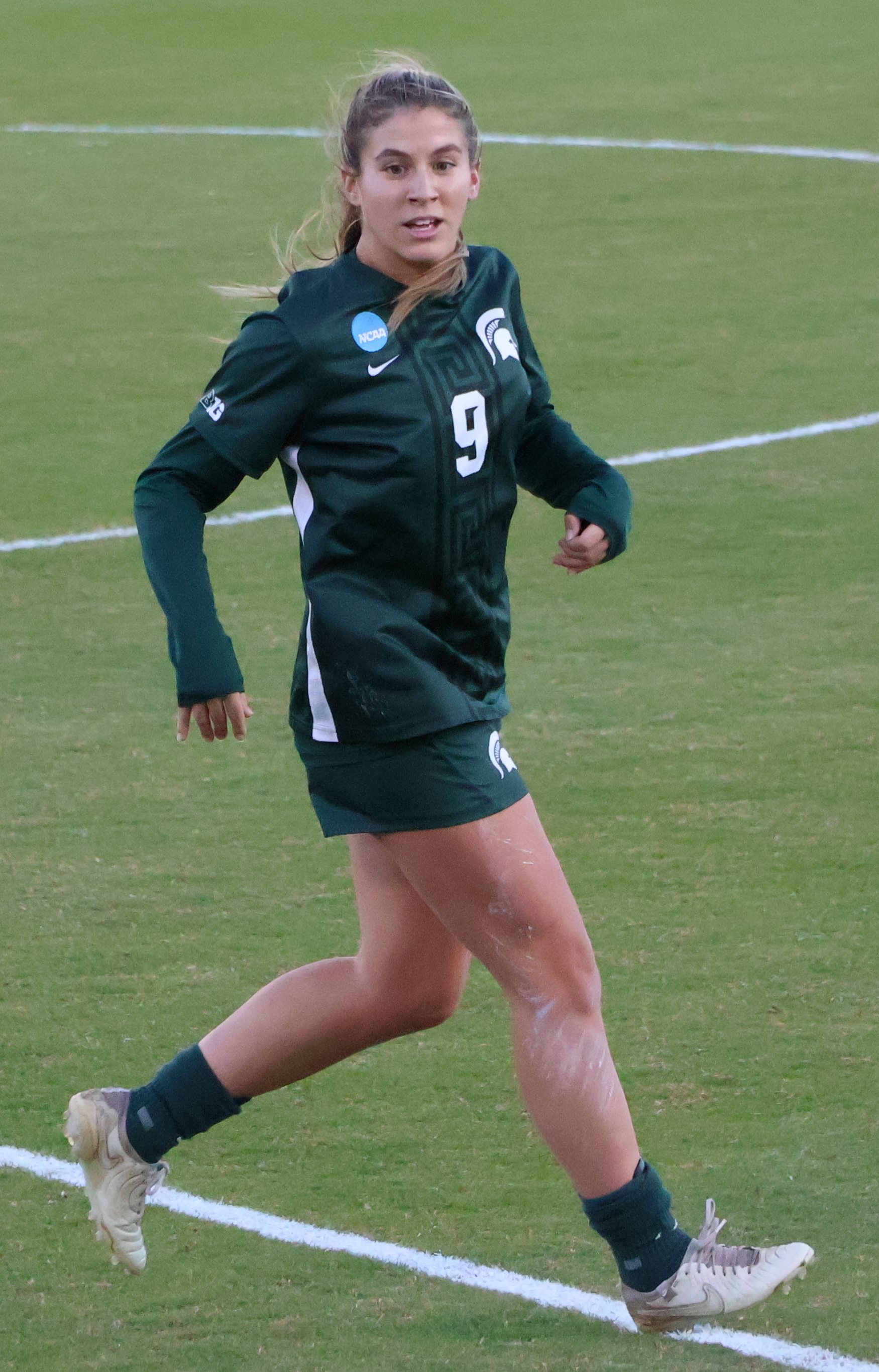
- Hughes with Michigan State in 2024

Personal information
- Full name: Meg Elizabeth Hughes
- Date of birth: May 16, 2002 (age 24)
- Height: 5 ft 6 in (1.68 m)
- Positions: Forward; midfielder

Team information
- Current team: Sporting JAX
- Number: 7

Youth career
- Scorpions SC

College career
Years	Team	Apps	(Gls)
2020–2023	Providence Friars	70	(23)
2024	Michigan State Spartans	16	(7)

Senior career*
Years	Team	Apps	(Gls)
2025–	Sporting JAX	40	(2)
- * Club domestic league appearances and goals as of November 15, 2026

Meg Elizabeth Hughes (born May 16, 2002) is an American professional soccer player who plays as a forward for USL Super League club Sporting JAX. She played college soccer for the Providence Friars and the Michigan State Spartans.

== Early life ==
Hughes grew up in Rochester, Massachusetts. She set the school scoring record at Old Rochester Regional High School with 127 goals, earned all-state honors twice, and was named the Standard-Times player of the year in 2018. She played ECNL soccer for Scorpions SC.

== College career ==
Hughes played four seasons for the Providence Friars, scoring 23 goals and providing 13 assists in 70 games. She was named the Big East Conference Freshman of the Year in 2020 and was selected to all-conference teams all four years, twice picking up first-team honors. She also ran track while at Providence, recording personal bests of 56.36 s in the 400 meters and 1:01.29 in the 400 meter hurdles. She then transferred to the Michigan State Spartans for a fifth and final season. She scored 7 goals with 6 assists in 22 games in 2024, receiving second-team All-Big Ten honors.

== Club career ==
Hughes was a trialist with the Washington Spirit in the 2025 preseason. On July 1, 2025, USL Super League expansion club Sporting JAX announced that they had signed Hughes to their inaugural season. She made her professional debut on August 23, starting in Sporting JAX's inaugurl game and setting up Jade Pennock's inaugural goal in a 3–1 loss to DC Power FC. The following week, she scored her first professional goal in a 3–2 win over the Tampa Bay Sun. She finished her rookie season with 2 goals and 7 assists in 28 games. She tied with three teammates to lead the league in assists. After placing second in the standings, Sporting JAX lost 1–0 to the Carolina Ascent in the playoff semifinals.

== Career statistics ==
=== College ===
As of match played November 24, 2024

Season	Games		Scoring				
Season	GP	GS	G	A	PTS	SH	SOG
Providence Friars
2020	12	4	4	6	14	24	0
2020–21	12	4	4	6	14	24	15
2021	20	20	9	4	22	75	38
2022	19	18	2	4	8	49	18
2023	20	20	8	0	16	56	34
Michigan State Spartans
2024	16	15	7	3	17	28	21
Career
Career total	98	81	34	23	91	256	126

=== Professional ===
As of match played November 15, 2026

Club	Season	League			Cup		Playoffs		Total	
Club	Season	Division	Apps	Goals	Apps	Goals	Apps	Goals	Apps	Goals
Sporting JAX	2025–26	(United States) USLS	28	2	—		1	0	29	2
Sporting JAX	2026	(United States) USLS	12	0	—		—		12	0
Career total			40	2	—		1	0	41	2

== Honors and awards ==
Individual

- Second-team All-Big Ten: 2024
- First-team All-Big East: 2021, 2023
- Second-team All-Big East: 2020, 2022
- Big East Freshman of the Year: 2020
