= Andrea Fernández (footballer) =

Spanish footballer (born 2000)

Personal information
- Full name: Andrea Fernández Fernández
- Date of birth: 30 July 2000 (age 26)
- Height: 1.63 m (5 ft 4 in)
- Position: Forward

Team information
- Current team: Sporting JAX
- Number: 11

Youth career
- –2021: Colegio Salesianos San José

College career
Years	Team	Apps	(Gls)
2021–2024	Flagler Saints	78	(75)

Senior career*
Years	Team	Apps	(Gls)
2025–	Sporting JAX	22	(1)
- * Club domestic league appearances and goals as of 16 October 2026

Andrea Fernández Fernández (born 30 July 2000) is a Spanish professional footballer who plays as a forward for USL Super League club Sporting JAX. One of the most prolific goal-scorers in NCAA Division II history, she is the first Flagler College student-athlete to be named a national player of the year in the NCAA era.

== Early life ==
A native of Pozoblanco, Spain, Fernández attended Colegio Salesianos San José. She later moved to the United States to attend Flagler College in St. Augustine, Florida, where she majored in criminology.

== College career ==
Fernández played four seasons, from 2021 to 2024 for the Flagler Saints, scoring 75 goals and registering 45 assists in 78 appearances. She is the program's all-time leader in goals, assists, and total points. In 2024, her senior season, she led NCAA Division II with 22 goals, 57 points, 1.22 goals per game, and 3.17 points per game, while finishing second with 0.72 assists per game and third in total assists with 13. That year, she was named the Division 2 Conference Commissioners Association (D2CCA) National Player of the Year, earning the prestigious Ron Lenz Award, and became Flagler College's first-ever NCAA Division II national player of the year. She was also selected to the United Soccer Coaches (USC) All-America Third Team.

== Club career ==
On 26 June 2025, Fernández signed with Sporting JAX ahead of their inaugural USL Super League season.

== Personal life ==
Fernández is the daughter of Faustino Fernández Calero and Belén Fernández Peralbo, and has one sister. She is fluent in Spanish and English. After scoring in a friendly against Kansas City Current II, she made the Sign of the Cross, kissed her finger, and pointed to the sky.

== Career statistics ==
=== Club ===
As of match played 16 October 2026

Club	Season	League			Cup		Playoffs		Total	
Club	Season	Division	Apps	Goals	Apps	Goals	Apps	Goals	Apps	Goals
Sporting JAX	2025–26	(United States) USLS	18	1	—		0	0	18	1
Sporting JAX	2026	(United States) USLS	4	0	—		—		4	0
Career total			22	1	—		0	0	22	1

== Honors and awards ==
- D2CCA National Player of the Year: 2024
- USC All-America (Third Team): 2024
- Peach Belt Conference Offensive Player of the Year: 2021, 2022, 2023, 2024
- Select Sport Gold Ball Award: 2021–2024
- D2CCA Southeast Region Player of the Year: 2022, 2024
