= Coco Thistle =

American soccer player (born 2004)

Personal information
- Full name: Cosette Alexa Thistle
- Date of birth: March 17, 2004 (age 22)
- Height: 5 ft 8 in (1.73 m)
- Position: Midfielder

Team information
- Current team: Sporting JAX
- Number: 36

Youth career
- San Diego Surf

College career
Years	Team	Apps	(Gls)
2022	Colorado Buffaloes	13	(0)
2023–2025	California Golden Bears	33	(4)

Senior career*
Years	Team	Apps	(Gls)
2026–	Sporting JAX	3	(0)
- * Club domestic league appearances and goals as of October 16, 2026

Cosette Alexa "Coco" Thistle (born March 17, 2004) is an American professional soccer player who plays as a midfielder for Sporting JAX of the USL Super League. She played college soccer for the Colorado Buffaloes and the California Golden Bears.

== Early life ==
Thistle graduated as valedictorian from Classical Academy in Escondido, California, in 2022 with a 4.0 GPA. Thistle did not participate in high school soccer due to California Interscholastic Federation rules. Instead, she played club soccer with the San Diego Surf, where she won multiple MVP awards and was part of the team that won a national championship in 2014. She was ranked the No. 9 midfielder in Southern California, No. 15 overall nationally by TopDrawerSoccer, and No. 41 in the IMG Academy 50 rankings. Her club coaches included Josh Henderson and Rob Becerra.

== College career ==
=== Colorado Buffaloes ===
Thistle began her collegiate career with the Colorado Buffaloes. She made her debut on August 18, 2022, against Weber State and appeared in 13 games during her freshman season. She recorded one shot in a 6–0 victory over Texas A&M–Commerce.

=== California Golden Bears ===
Thistle transferred to play for the California Golden Bears for the 2023 season. She appeared in 14 games, starting 12, and scored her first collegiate goal—a game-winning strike against Oregon State on October 22, 2023. In 2024, after experiencing respiratory symptoms for several years, Thistle was diagnosed with a carcinoid tumor in her upper left lung. Physicians indicated that she had likely been playing with the condition for more than two years prior to the diagnosis. She underwent a lobectomy to remove the tumor and the affected lobe and later returned to collegiate soccer following her recovery.

During the 2025 season, Thistle contributed to key victories, including a 2–1 win over Arizona, scoring in the third minute and assisting a second goal in the 27th minute. She also helped maintain offensive pressure in matches where the team played short-handed, recording multiple shots and supporting the team's tactical adjustments, including during a game against Cal Poly. She was named to the 2025 All-Atlantic Coast Conference (ACC) Academic Team for her performance both on the field and in the classroom.

== Club career ==
On February 18, 2026, Thistle signed her first professional contract with Sporting JAX of the USL Super League. She joined as a midseason addition to their inaugural roster.

== International career ==
Thistle attended United States women's national soccer team training camps and participated in the April 2021 United States U-18 women's national team Virtual Camp.

== Statistics ==
=== College ===
As of match played October 30, 2025

Season	Games		Scoring				
Season	GP	GS	G	A	PTS	SH	SOG
Colorado Buffaloes
2022	13	0	0	0	0	1	0
California Golden Bears
2023	14	12	1	0	2	9	4
2024	Did not participate						
2025	19	18	3	4	10	27	7
Career
Career total	46	30	4	4	12	37	11

=== Professional ===
As of match played October 16, 2026

Club	Season	League			Cup		Playoffs		Total	
Club	Season	Division	Apps	Goals	Apps	Goals	Apps	Goals	Apps	Goals
Sporting JAX	2025–26	(United States) USLS	0	0	—		0	0	0	0
Sporting JAX	2026	(United States) USLS	3	0	—		—		3	0
Career total			3	0	—		—		3	0

== Personal life ==
Thistle was born to Loren and Bryan Thistle, who played college football at Dartmouth College. She has a younger brother, Kellan. She majored in psychology.
