= Jamie Gerstenberg =

German association football player

Personal information
- Full name: Jamie Marie Gerstenberg
- Date of birth: 11 December 2002 (age 23)
- Height: 1.80 m (5 ft 11 in)
- Position: Goalkeeper

Team information
- Current team: Sporting JAX
- Number: 1

Youth career
- 2019–2021: 1. FFC Turbine Potsdam

College career
Years	Team	Apps	(Gls)
2021–2024	Indiana Hoosiers	67	(0)

Senior career*
Years	Team	Apps	(Gls)
2025–	Sporting JAX	15	(0)

International career^{‡}
2017–2019	Germany U17	31	(0)
2020–2021	Germany U19	3	(0)
- * Club domestic league appearances and goals as of 15 November 2026 ‡ National team caps and goals as of 27 August 2025

Jamie Marie Gerstenberg (/ˈɡɜːrstənˌbɛrɡ/ GURR-stən-berg; born 11 December 2002) is a German footballer who plays as a goalkeeper for Sporting JAX in the USL Super League. She previously played collegiate soccer at Indiana University, where she was named the Big Ten Goalkeeper of the Year in 2023.

== Early life ==
Gerstenberg grew up in Birkenwerder, Germany, and played youth football with 1. FFC Turbine Potsdam. In June 2019, Gerstenberg was promoted to the first team of 1. FFC Turbine Potsdam ahead of the 2019–20 season, alongside Marie Höbinger and Sophie Weidauer. At just 16 years old, Gerstenberg had already trained with the senior squad during the previous season and expressed excitement about the challenge of gaining experience at the top level.

== College career ==
Gerstenberg attended Indiana University from 2021 to 2024, making 67 appearances and earning 30 career shutouts—the most in program history. She posted a career goals against average (GAA) of 0.81 and made 185 saves.

As a freshman in 2021, Gerstenberg tied the Indiana single-season shutout record with nine and earned a spot on the Big Ten All-Freshman Team. She finished the season with a 0.49 GAA.

She continued her strong performances through her sophomore and junior seasons, recording multiple Big Ten Goalkeeper of the Week honors and setting the program’s all-time shutout record. In 2023, she was named Big Ten Goalkeeper of the Year and helped lead Indiana to the NCAA Tournament.

In her senior season, she played 17 matches, registered five shutouts, and concluded her collegiate career with the best statistical resume of any goalkeeper in school history.

== Club career ==
On 26 June 2025, Gerstenberg signed with Sporting JAX, an expansion club in the USL Super League.

In September 2026, Gerstenberg was named to the USL Super League Team of the Month for her contributions made during August 2026, which included two shutouts.

== International career ==
Gerstenberg has also represented Germany at the U17 and U19 levels. She competed in UEFA youth competitions during her time with the national program.

== Statistics ==
=== College ===
Season	Games		Goalkeeping			
Season	GP	GS	Minutes	Saves	GAA	Shutouts
Indiana Hoosiers
2021	16	16	1,456	36	0.49	9
2022	14	14	1,170	52	0.77	7
2023	20	20	1,755	52	0.82	10
2024	17	17	1,527	45	0.81	5
Career
Career total	67	67	5,908	185	0.73	31

=== Professional ===
As of match played 15 November 2026

Club	Season	League			Cup		Playoffs		Total	
Club	Season	Division	Apps	CS	Apps	CS	Apps	CS	Apps	CS
Sporting JAX	2025–26	(United States) USLS	6	1	—		0	0	6	1
Sporting JAX	2026	(United States) USLS	9	2	—		—		9	2
Career total			15	3	—		0	0	15	3

== Honors ==
- USL Super League Team of the Month: August 2026
- Big Ten Goalkeeper of the Year: 2023
- All-Big Ten First Team: 2023
- Big Ten All-Freshman Team: 2021
- Big Ten Freshman of the Week: 2021
- Big Ten Goalkeeper of the Week: Multiple times
- TopDrawerSoccer Freshman Top 100 (No. 21): 2021
- TopDrawerSoccer Preseason Top 100 (No. 48): 2024

== Personal life ==
Gerstenberg is the daughter of Detlef and Christiane Gerstenberg and has one brother, Tim.
