= Amanda Poorbaugh =

American soccer player (born 2003)

Personal information
- Full name: Amanda Nicole Poorbaugh
- Date of birth: July 31, 2003 (age 23)
- Place of birth: Westerville, Ohio, U.S.
- Height: 5 ft 7 in (1.70 m)
- Position: Goalkeeper

Team information
- Current team: Sporting JAX
- Number: 0

Youth career
- 2013–2016: SC Buitenveldert
- Ohio Premier

College career
Years	Team	Apps	(Gls)
2021–2025	Penn State Nittany Lions	21	(0)

Senior career*
Years	Team	Apps	(Gls)
2023	Minnesota Aurora	–	(–)
2026–	Sporting JAX	0	(0)
- * Club domestic league appearances and goals as of 16:25, July 1, 2026 (UTC)

Amanda Nicole Poorbaugh (born July 31, 2003) is an American professional soccer player who plays as a goalkeeper for USL Super League club Sporting JAX. She played college soccer for the Penn State Nittany Lions.

== Early life ==
Poorbaugh was born and raised in Westerville, Ohio. She attended Olentangy Orange High School, where she contributed to two conference championships and one district championship. In 2020, she was named the conference Player of the Year and a second-team all-state honoree. Poorbaugh graduated from Olentangy Orange having set school records in shutouts and having earned first-team all-district and all-conference honors as well. She played club soccer in the Elite Clubs National League for Ohio Premier, in addition to SC Buitenveldert when she lived abroad in the Netherlands for a number of years.

== College career ==
Poorbaugh played college soccer for the Penn State Nittany Lions. She was initially slated to have played her first minutes at Penn State in 2021, but she redshirted her freshman season and did not earn any minutes the following year either. She made her collegiate debut in a shutout victory over West Chester on August 20, 2023. She appeared twice more as a redshirt sophomore, but struggled to dethrone teammate Kat Asman from the starting goalkeeper job.

In the offseason before her redshirt junior year, Poorbaugh played in the pre-professional USL W League for Minnesota Aurora FC. She helped the Aurora register an undefeated season until being defeated in the playoffs by Indy Eleven. Upon returning to Penn State in 2024, Poorbaugh had her most prominent season, racking up a career-high 1,126 minutes. She played one more year at Penn State before departing from the program having starred in 21 total matches.

== Club career ==
After graduating from college, Poorbaugh joined Racing Louisville FC of the National Women's Soccer League (NWSL) as a non-rostered trialist in the 2026 preseason. She did not ultimately sign for the club. Instead, in June 2026, she participated for Simply Fútbol FC in The Soccer Tournament. She led her team to the TST championship match and was named the competition's Golden Glove for her performances.

On July 1, 2026, Sporting JAX announced that they had signed Poorbaugh to her first professional contract ahead of the team's second season in the USL Super League.

== Career statistics ==
=== Club ===
As of July 1, 2026

Appearances and goals by club, season and competition
Club	Season	League			Cup		Playoffs		Total	
Club	Season	Division	Apps	Goals	Apps	Goals	Apps	Goals	Apps	Goals
Sporting JAX	2026	USL Super League	0	0	—		—		0	0
Career total			0	0	0	0	0	0	0	0
