= Sporting Club Jacksonville (women) =

Professional soccer club in Florida

- Full name: Sporting Club Jacksonville
- Nickname: Sporting JAX
- Founded: 16 May 2023; 3 years ago
- Stadium: Hodges Stadium
- Capacity: 12,000
- Owners: Ricky Caplin (majority); Tony Allegretti; Tim Tebow; Fred Taylor
- Head coach: Stacey Balaam
- League: USL Super League
- 2025–26: USL Super League, 2nd of 9; Playoffs: Semi-finals
- Website: https://www.SportingJAX.com
| Home colors | Away colors | Third colors |

Sporting Club Jacksonville, colloquially referred to as Sporting JAX, is an American professional women's soccer club based in Jacksonville, Florida, that competes in the USL Super League (USLS). Founded in 2023, the club began playing in 2025.

== History ==
=== Founding ===
A USL Championship franchise in Jacksonville was announced on August 30, 2022, led by venture capitalist Ricky Caplin and former Heisman Trophy-winning quarterback Tim Tebow. The group partnered with Florida Elite Soccer Academy, rebranding it as the Sporting JAX Soccer Academy, to form a full development pathway.

In May 2023, the JAXUSL group was awarded a conditional franchise in the USL Super League, pending completion of a soccer-specific stadium project. The club expanded its leadership team with the addition of former Florida Gators women's soccer head coach Becky Burleigh as a women’s team advisor in June 2023. Later that year, on November 30—coinciding with the 30th anniversary of the National Football League awarding Jacksonville its franchise—former Jacksonville Jaguars star Fred Taylor joined the ownership group.

Sporting Club Jacksonville, branded as Sporting JAX, was officially unveiled on December 12, 2023, along with its logo and team colors.

=== Super League era ===
Mark Warburton, best known for leading Rangers FC back to the Scottish Premiership in 2016, was named Sporting Director and Head of Soccer on March 20, 2025. He oversees both the men’s and women’s teams.

The coaching staff for the women’s team began taking shape in spring 2025. Stacey Balaam, former associate head coach for the Vanderbilt Commodores women's program, was appointed the inaugural head coach in early April, bringing prior head coaching experience at the collegiate level with the West Georgia Wolves.

In April, the club also named veteran U.S. Soccer performance coach Steve Fell as Head of Sports Performance, overseeing all athletic performance across the organization, from the USL Super League and USL Championship squads to the 10,000-player youth academy. A St. Augustine resident, Fell brought experience from over 200 professional matches and his tenure with the United States men's national soccer team at the 2022 FIFA World Cup, CONCACAF Nations League, Gold Cup, and 2026 World Cup cycle.

In May, Alan Kirkup was named associate head coach. His résumé includes head coaching roles with the Arkansas Razorbacks, Maryland Terrapins, and SMU Mustangs women's soccer programs. He previously served on advisor Becky Burleigh’s staff at the University of Florida. On June 17, 2025, the club announced the appointment of Mat Cosgriff as goalkeeper coach. Cosgriff previously served as associate head coach of the SMU Mustangs women's soccer team.

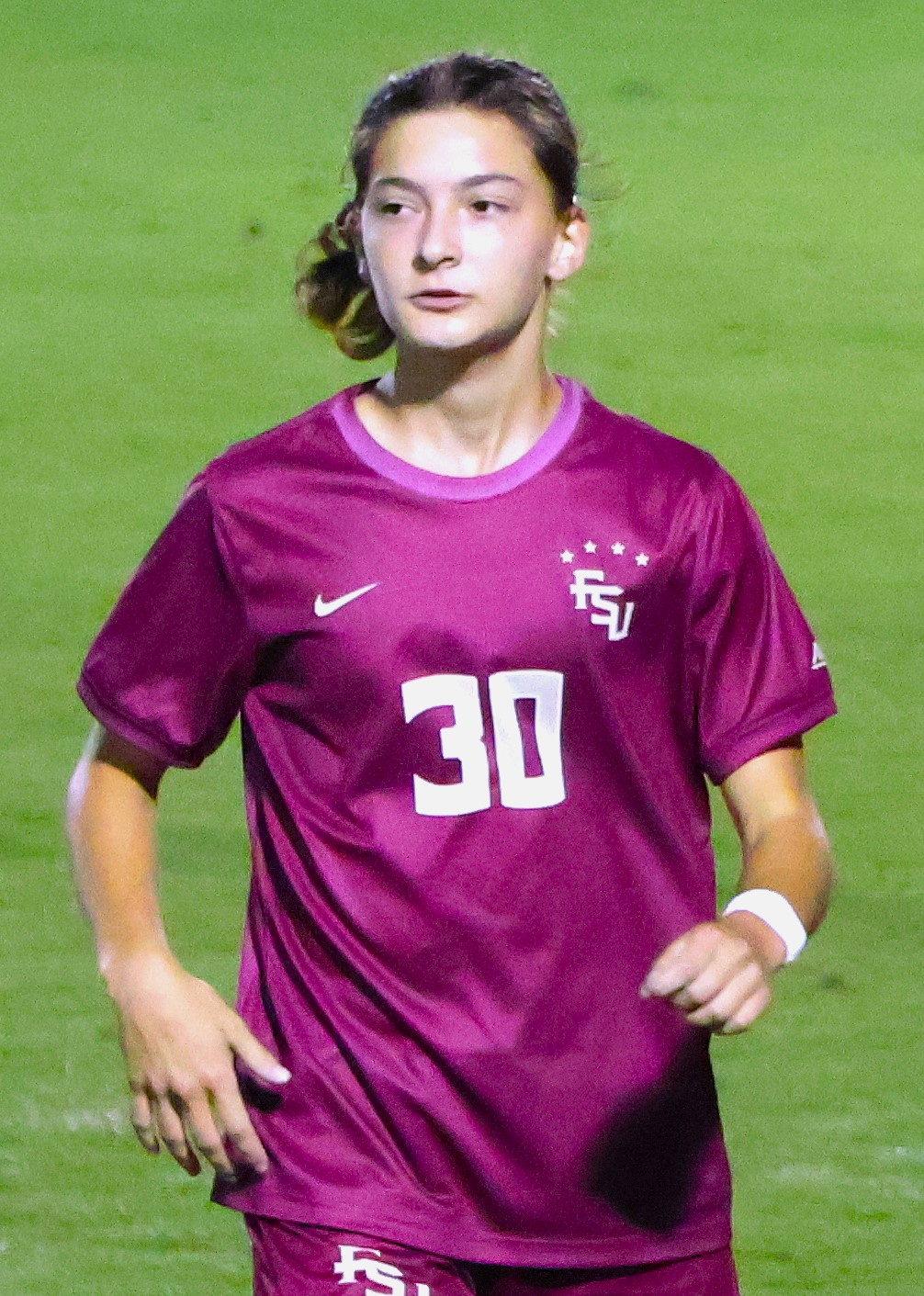
Ashlyn Puerta in 2024.

Player signings began on May 21, 2025, with South Florida Bulls defender Georgia Brown and Florida State Seminoles midfielder/forward Ashlyn Puerta as the first additions to the inaugural roster. This marked the club’s initial step in assembling a competitive team for its debut season in the USL Super League.

On March 24, 2026, Sporting JAX announced that they had parted ways with CEO Steve Livingstone, while simultaneously promoting Mark Warburton to president of soccer.

=== Inaugural season ===
Sporting JAX began play in the 2025–26 USL Super League season. The team opened its first preseason training camp in July 2025 and hosted a series of preseason matches, including international friendlies, in preparation for its competitive debut. On July 24, 2025, one month before the season began, Sporting JAX announced that 6,000 season tickets had been sold, representing ~64% of Hodges Stadium's capacity. As a result, the team moved up the release date for single-game ticket sales to the same day.

Jade Pennock scored the first goal in Sporting JAX's history during the club's inaugural match against DC Power FC. Despite the milestone, Sporting JAX lost the season opener 3–1. The club reported total ticket sales for the match at 9,783. In the club's second match on August 30, 2025, Ashlyn Puerta scored the team's first brace in a 3–2 victory over Tampa Bay Sun FC, earning Sporting JAX their first win. She would go on to score the club's first hat-trick on September 28, 2025, in a 4–3 victory over Carolina Ascent FC. For her outstanding performances in September 2025, Ashlyn Puerta was named USL Super League Player of the Month—marking the first time a player from the club has received this honor. Puerta, along with teammate Julia Lester, was also named to the USL Super League Team of the Month for September.

On October 14, Kaitlyn Parks recorded the club's first clean sheet in a 1–0 victory over DC Power FC. On November 6, she won the USL Super League Save of the Month for a high-rising save made during the match. Two days later, on October 16, Sporting JAX academy player Sydney Schmidt signed a professional contract with North Carolina Courage of the National Women's Soccer League (NWSL), becoming the first player to transfer out of the squad.

Sporting JAX secured their first official home win, a 2–0 victory over Fort Lauderdale United FC, on November 22, 2025. During the match, Ashlyn Puerta scored her tenth goal of the season in her eleventh match, setting a USL Super League record for the fastest player to reach ten goals. In December, the club earned its second USL Super League Player of the Month honor in three months when Paige Kenton was recognized for November 2025, having recorded two goals and one assist on six shots during the month. Although an expansion team, a 3–1 victory over Tampa Bay Sun FC on December 20, 2025, placed Sporting JAX atop the USL Super League standings at the winter break. With her 11th goal at the season’s midpoint, Ashlyn Puerta moved within two of the 13 goals that secured the previous season’s Golden Boot. For her coaching efforts in December 2025, Balaam was named USL Super League Coach of the Month. The team went 2–0–1 and took the lead in the league standings over Lexington SC. She was subsequently named Coach of the Month for February 2026, following the midseason break.

In March 2026, goalkeeper Kaitlyn Parks was named USL Super League Player of the Month for her contributions made during the month of February. She allowed only one goal and the team won three of four matches. Sporting JAX clinched a playoff berth in its inaugural season on April 6, following Fort Lauderdale United FC's 3–1 victory over DC Power FC, which mathematically eliminated DC Power from surpassing Jacksonville in the standings. The club, at the time of clinching the playoff spot, was in first place with 44 points and had six regular-season matches remaining, including two home fixtures.

Sporting Jax's women's team concluded its inaugural season on May 24, advancing to the playoff semifinals. Puerta was named the Gainbridge Super League Player of the Year and Young Player of the Year and received the Golden Playmaker award after recording 12 goals and seven assists during the season. Balaam was named Coach of the Year after leading Sporting Jax to 16 regular-season victories in her first professional coaching season. The team also had six players selected to the All-League team.

== Ownership and staff ==
=== Ownership ===
As of May 1, 2025

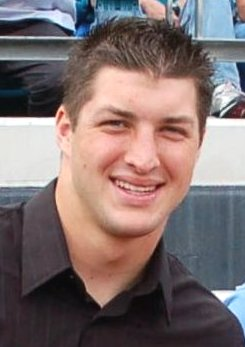
Tim Tebow, Minority Owner

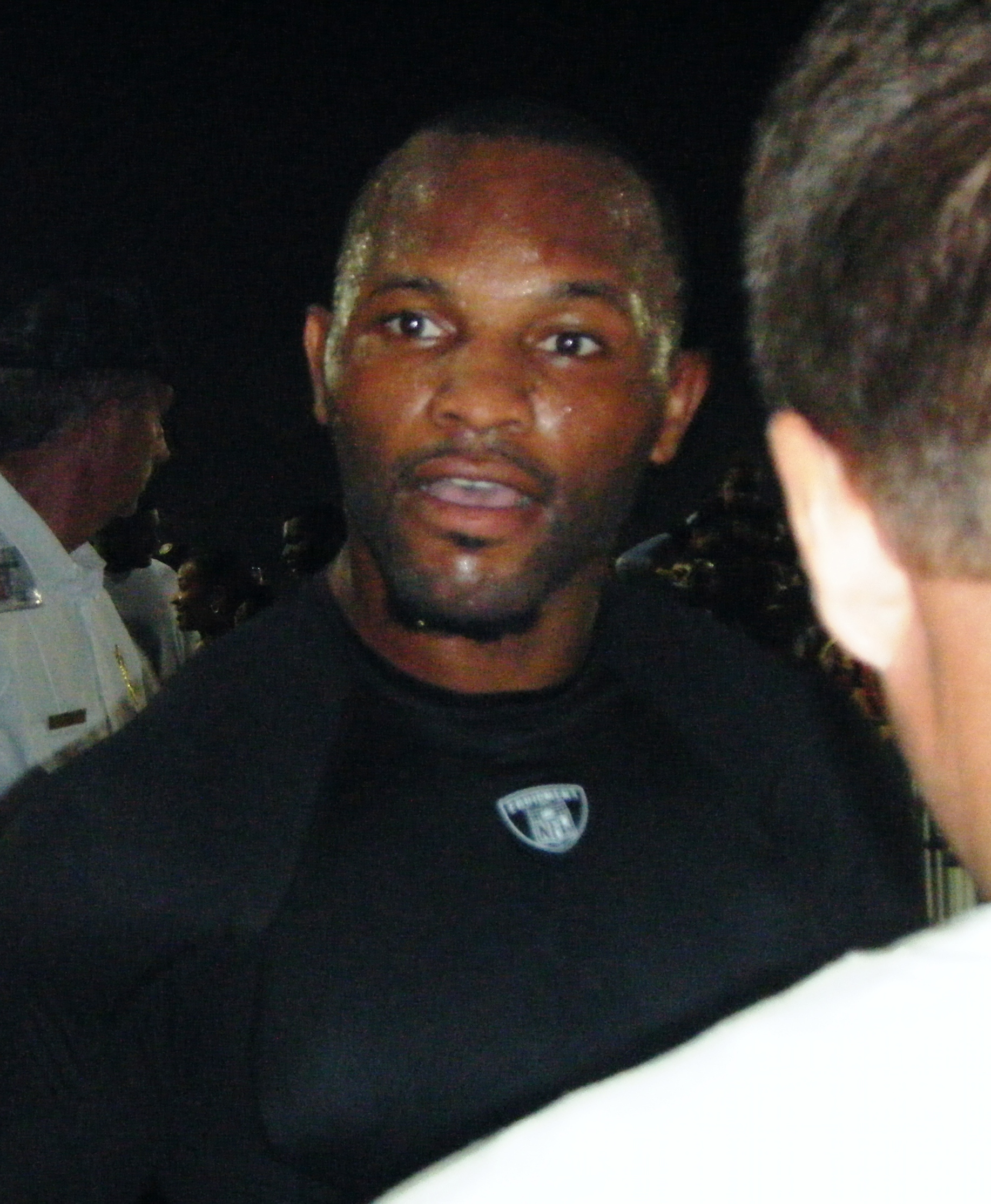
Fred Taylor, Minority Owner

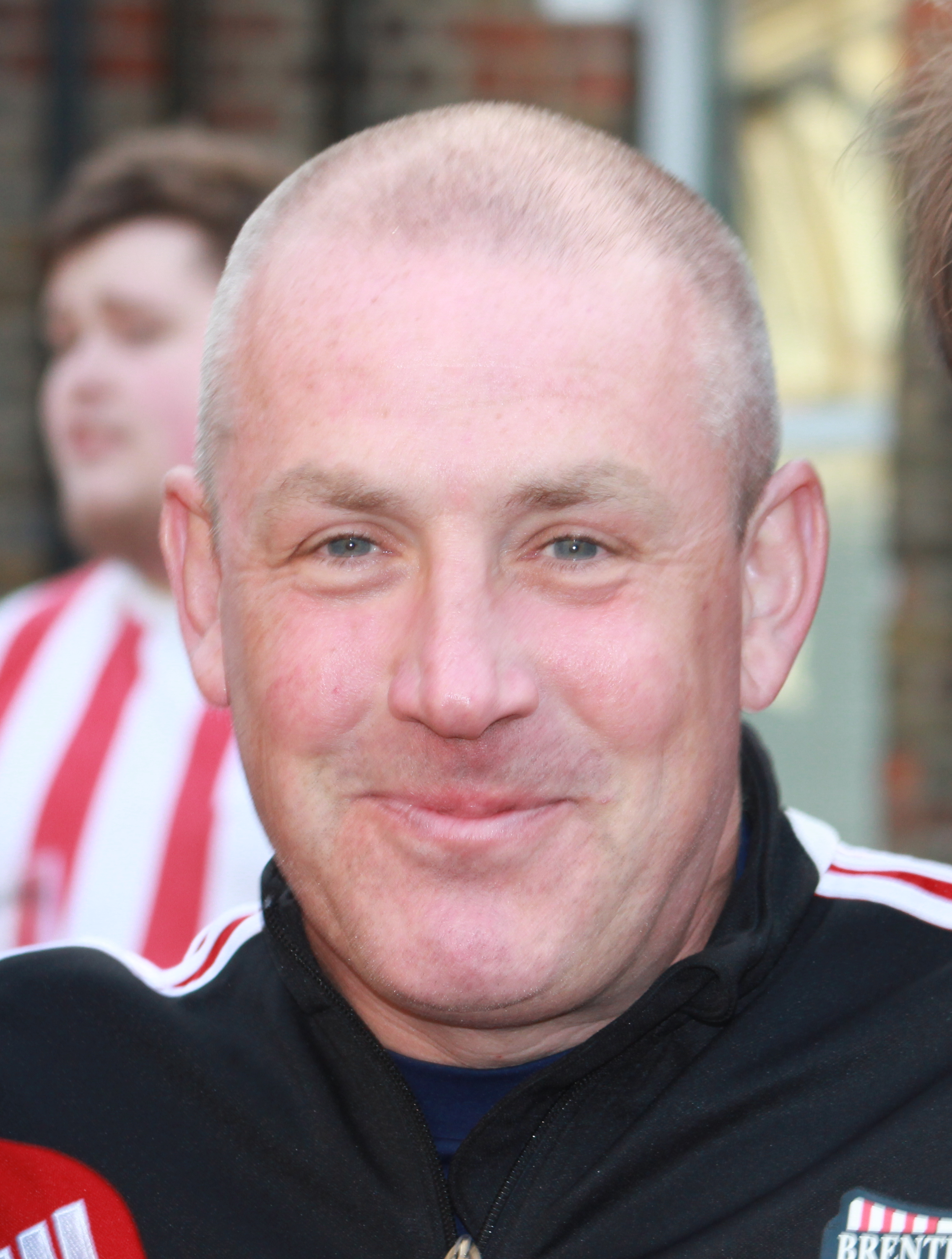
Mark Warburton, Head of Soccer, Sporting Director

Ownership
| Majority owner | Ricky Caplin |
| Minority owner | Steve Livingstone |
| Minority owner | Tony Allegretti |
| Minority owner | Tim Tebow |
| Minority owner | Fred Taylor |

As of February 5, 2026

Executive
| Club President and CEO | Steve Livingstone |
| Executive Vice President of Business Management | J.J. Keitzer |
| Chief Community Officer | Tony Allegretti |
| Vice President of Ticket Sales & Service | Tim Hensley |
| Special Advisor to the President | Bob Ohrablo |
| Team Advisor | Becky Burleigh |
| Director of Marketing and Brand | David Phillips |
| Director of Broadcasting and Digital Content | Cole Pepper |
| Director of Ticket Sales and Services | Jack Gonzalez |
| Senior Manager, Business Operations and Development | Sara Garcia-Malone |
| Head of Operations | Marshall Happer |
| Merchandise Manager | Anthony Ortiz |

=== Technical staff ===
As of June 17, 2025

| Position | Name |
|---|---|
| Head of Soccer, Sporting Director | (England) Mark Warburton |
| Head coach | (England) Stacey Balaam |
| Associate Head Coach | (England) Alan Kirkup |
| Goalkeeper Coach | (United States) Mat Cosgriff |
| Head of Sports Performance | (United States) Steve Fell |

== Stadium ==
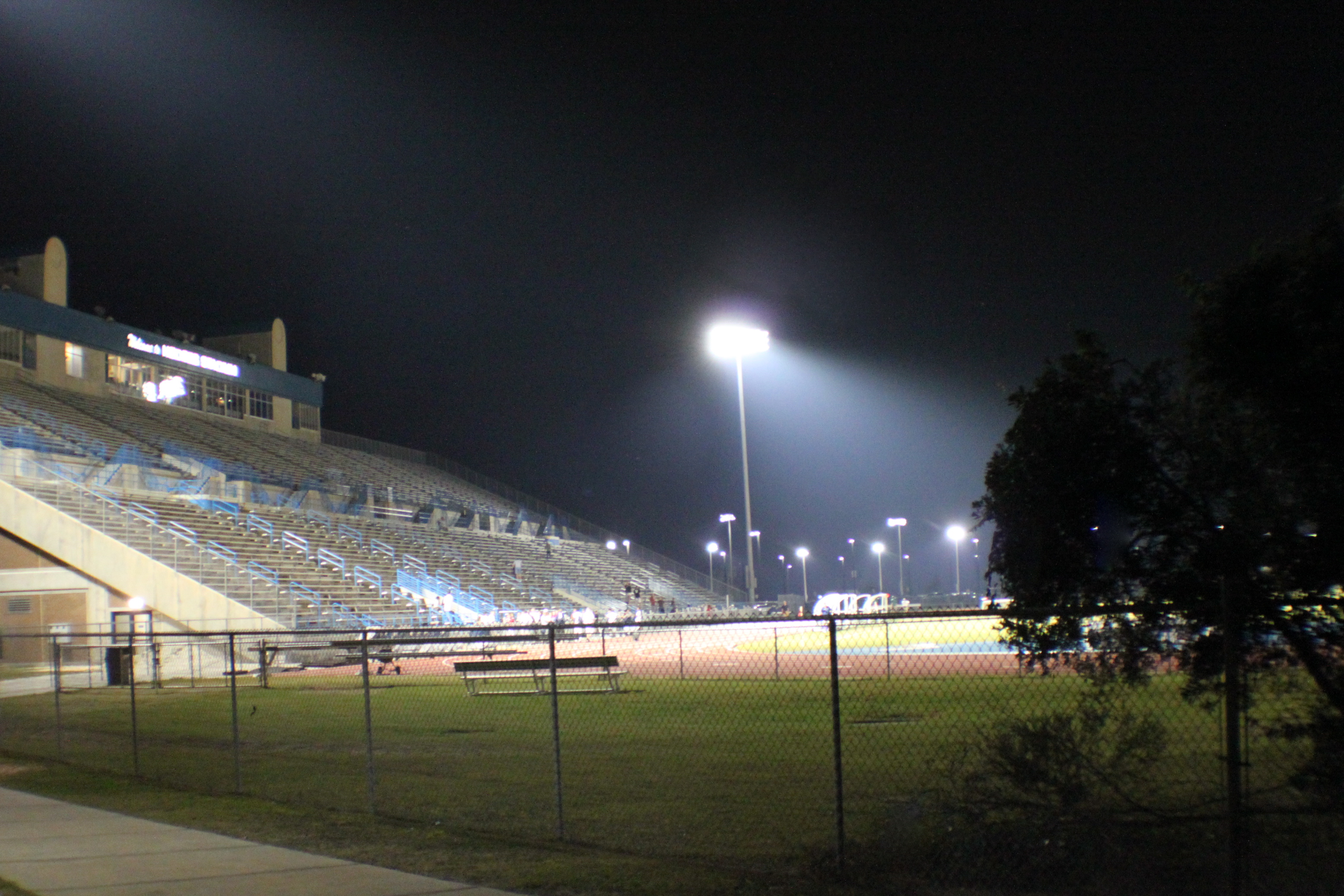
Hodges Stadium

Until the completion of their permanent home venue, Sporting JAX will play its home matches at Hodges Stadium on the campus of the University of North Florida. The stadium, which seats approximately 9,400 spectators, will serve as the club's temporary home beginning with its inaugural USL Super League season in 2025. The stadium's capacity can reach 12,000.

The club has announced plans to construct a new soccer-specific stadium in Jacksonville, with a target opening date in 2026 or 2027, subject to final approvals and construction timelines. The new facility is expected to accommodate approximately 15,000 spectators and serve as the long-term home for both the men's and women's teams.

On September 10, 2025, in a press release, it was announced that Orlando-based Momentous Sports, a private investment firm involved in sports and real estate development, is supporting the development of a mixed-use district surrounding a proposed Sporting JAX stadium, which is planned to include residential, retail, and community spaces. Its investor group includes former professional athletes such as John Elway, Blake Bortles, and Sporting JAX co-owner Tim Tebow, as well as business figures including Chick-fil-A CEO Andrew Cathy.

As of September 17, 2025, Zoe Haugen, president of Haugen Holdings—the public relations and marketing firm representing the club—confirmed that a previously reported site at the former Sears space in Regency Square Mall was no longer under consideration for the stadium location.

In December 2025, Sporting JAX president and CEO Steve Livingstone provided further details on the club's stadium plans in an interview with the Jacksonville Daily Record. While no stadium location had been announced as of January 8, 2026, he confirmed the proposed 15,000-seat stadium would be paired with a mixed-use development including retail, dining, hotel, and community spaces, and could include practice facilities for the club's youth academies. Livingstone also stated that the stadium is intended to serve as a year-round community venue capable of hosting high school championships, NCAA tournaments, markets, and other events.

On February 24, 2026, the club announced the appointment of Michael McNaughton as president of the Sporting JAX Development Company, responsible for the club's real estate and master-planning initiatives. McNaughton, a real estate executive with more than 30 years of experience in large-scale and mixed-use development, will lead plans for a purpose-built sporting district intended to serve as the permanent home of the club's men's and women's teams. He previously held senior roles with Westfield Corporation, where he was involved in U.S. development projects including the redevelopment of the World Trade Center in Lower Manhattan, and served as founder and chief operating officer of Rouse Properties.

On March 2, 2026, Sporting JAX announced that its proposed permanent stadium and surrounding development would be located in the St. Johns Town Center area, marking the first time the club publicly identified a specific area of Jacksonville for the project. The organization described the initiative as a "transformative mixed-use sporting and entertainment district," centered on a 15,000-seat soccer-specific stadium intended to serve as the permanent home of both its men's and women's teams. The club did not announce a timeline or funding for the project, but want to "hit the ground running" when the permitting is completed.

== Players ==
=== Current roster ===
As of August 21, 2026

Note: Flags indicate national team as defined under FIFA eligibility rules; some limited exceptions apply. Players may hold more than one non-FIFA nationality.

| No. | Pos. | Nation | Player |
|---|---|---|---|
| 0 | GK | USA | Amanda Poorbaugh |
| 1 | GK | GER | Jamie Gerstenberg |
| 3 | MF | USA | Sophia Boman |
| 4 | FW | USA | AJ Hennessey |
| 5 | DF | SCO | Georgia Brown |
| 7 | MF | USA | Meg Hughes |
| 8 | MF | USA | Sophie Jones (captain) |
| 9 | MF | USA | Maci Teater |
| 10 | MF | USA | Ashlyn Puerta |
| 11 | FW | ESP | Andrea Fernández |
| 12 | MF | USA | Caroline Murray |
| 13 | GK | USA | Kaitlyn Parks |

| No. | Pos. | Nation | Player |
|---|---|---|---|
| 15 | MF | USA | Cat Rapp |
| 17 | FW | USA | Baylee DeSmit |
| 18 | MF | CAN | Mélina Descary |
| 20 | DF | USA | Keeley Dockter |
| 21 | MF | USA | Mya Swinton |
| 22 | MF | USA | Parker Roberts (vice-captain) |
| 23 | DF | USA | Ginger Fontenot |
| 24 | DF | USA | Grace Phillpotts |
| 27 | FW | USA | Paige Kenton |
| 32 | DF | USA | Maggie Illig |
| 36 | MF | USA | Coco Thistle |

==== Out on loan ====
Note: Flags indicate national team as defined under FIFA eligibility rules; some limited exceptions apply. Players may hold more than one non-FIFA nationality.

| No. | Pos. | Nation | Player |
|---|---|---|---|
| 16 | MF | NZL | Helena Errington (on loan to Fimleikafélag Hafnarfjarðar) |

==== Academy players ====
Note: Flags indicate national team as defined under FIFA eligibility rules; some limited exceptions apply. Players may hold more than one non-FIFA nationality.

| No. | Pos. | Nation | Player |
|---|---|---|---|
| 19 | MF | USA | Presley Cason |

=== Former players ===
For details of former players, see Category:Sporting Club Jacksonville (women) players and List of Sporting Club Jacksonville (women) players.

== Uniforms ==
Sporting JAX unveiled its inaugural home kit for the 2025–26 season during a public launch event and Fan Fest at Friendship Fountain on May 13, 2025. Designed in collaboration with Adidas, the kit features a custom light blue jersey with bold orange three-stripe detailing across the shoulders. The launch marked a major milestone for the club as it enters USL competition and aimed to unify its professional, pre-professional, and academy teams under a single visual identity.

| Period | Kit Manufacturer | Shirt Sponsor | Back Sponsor | Sleeve Sponsor | Shorts Sponsor |
|---|---|---|---|---|---|
| 2025 | Adidas | Caplin Ventures | N/A | N/A | N/A |
| 2025–present | Adidas | Ascension St. Vincent’s | VyStar Credit Union | Bomani Espresso Martinis | Price.com |

The home kit will be worn across all Sporting JAX teams, including those in USL League Two, USL W League, and the Sporting JAX Soccer Academy. The event also showcased goalkeeper kits, alternate and youth academy kits, as well as training wear and equipment. Players from the club's men's and women’s pre-professional teams modeled the kits, with the event drawing hundreds of fans and featuring appearances from club executives, coaching staff, and adidas representatives.

In July 2025, Sporting JAX announced a landmark multi-year partnership with Ascension St. Vincent’s, replacing Caplin Ventures as the front-of-jersey sponsor. The Jacksonville-based healthcare provider became the club’s first Founding Partner, sponsoring the women’s team and its 10,000-player youth academy. The deal includes comprehensive healthcare services for athletes, community outreach initiatives, and prominent branding at Hodges Stadium and across broadcast and digital platforms through the 2025 and 2026 seasons.

In October 2025, for a match against Tampa Bay Sun FC, the team wore pink socks in tribute to October's Breast Cancer Awareness Month.

On November 26, 2025, Sporting JAX announced a three-year partnership with Price.com, an AI-based comparison shopping and cashback platform. The agreement includes branding across the club’s women’s, men’s and academy teams and designates Price.com as the presenting partner of the club’s digital cashback and discounts program for season ticket holders and academy families. The partnership also places Price.com branding on the women’s team shorts, matchday signage and digital content, and rebrands certain seating areas at home matches as the Price.com Club Seats & Lounge.

== Media ==
Sporting JAX maintains a growing presence in local media through strategic partnerships with television, radio, and digital platforms in the Jacksonville area. These outlets provide fans with comprehensive coverage of Sporting JAX, the USL Championship, the USL Super League, and global soccer news.

Media Coverage
| WJXX/WTLV | Sporting JAX Report |
| WJXL (1010 AM) | The Coaches Show |
| WFXJ (930 AM) | The Sporting JAX Soccer Hour |

In addition to traditional media coverage, the club produces a podcast titled, The Sporting Pod, hosted by Cole Pepper and featuring regular appearances from team officials and players. It's available through Apple Podcasts, Spotify, and YouTube. Emerson Burris serves as the club’s official team reporter.

On April 25, 2025, Sporting JAX expanded its outreach by partnering with Norsan Media to deliver Spanish-language broadcasts. As the club’s exclusive Spanish-language media partner, Norsan Media offers coverage via La Raza 92.9 FM, Kaliente 94.1 FM, and Hola News, aiming to engage and grow the local Hispanic fan base.

=== Broadcast and Streaming ===
USL Super League matches, including those of Sporting JAX, are streamed exclusively on Peacock as part of the league’s national media rights agreement with NBCUniversal.

In addition to national streaming, Sporting JAX secured a local broadcast deal with First Coast News (WTLV/WJXX) and News4Jax (WJXT), providing regional over-the-air coverage of most home matches. The agreement aims to enhance the club’s visibility and fan engagement across Northeast Florida and Southeast Georgia.

== Mascot ==
Rex, a 20-foot-tall T. rex statue, is the official mascot of Sporting JAX and was unveiled in April 2025. It is an iconic local landmark located on Beach Boulevard. The mascot features a steel frame covered with stucco, glowing red eyes, and a fierce jaw. He debuted during the club's inaugural season in August 2025.

Rex embodies the club's connection to the Jacksonville community and its local culture, appearing prominently at games and community events through inflatable T. rex costumes. Fans often participate in "Dino Dashes," races held during matches in which they wear the suits, similar in spirit to the T-Rex World Championship Races at Emerald Downs.

On August 22, 2026, during the women's team's opening home match of the 2026 USL Super League season, the club debuted Sporting Rex, an orange T. rex mascot wearing a Sporting JAX uniform.

== Community ==
In October 2025, Sporting JAX partnered with Gainbridge, the USL Super League and the Baxter E. Luther Boys & Girls Club of Northeast Florida to install a soccer mini-pitch in Florida. This initiative is part of their ongoing efforts to provide accessible soccer facilities and foster youth development in underserved communities.

Sporting JAX hosts an annual high school soccer media day at the Riverside YMCA, bringing together local student-athletes and coaches ahead of the upcoming season. The event features team and individual photos, interviews, and opportunities for local media coverage, promoting the sport and fostering community engagement.

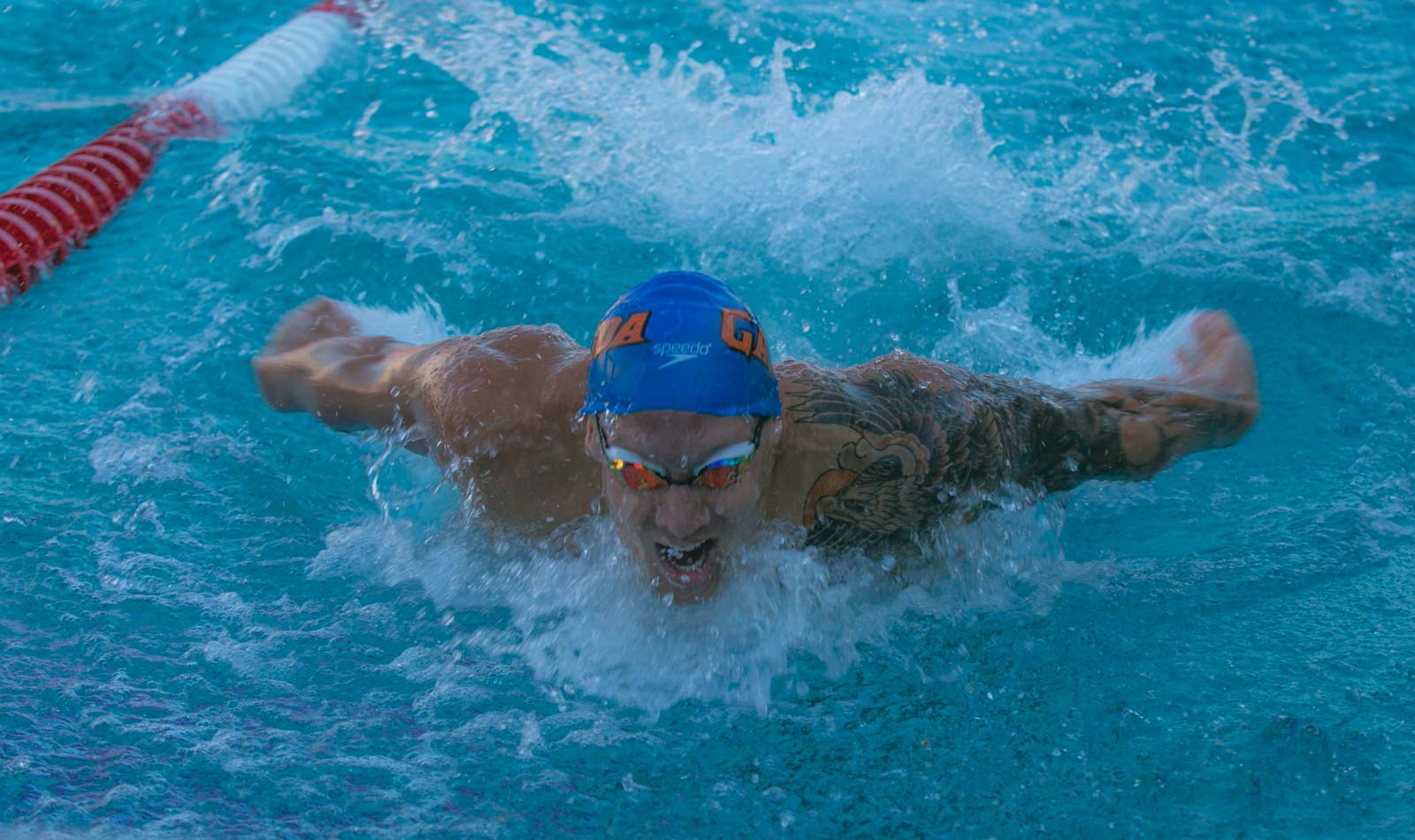
Caeleb Dressel in the 100m fly.

=== Swimming ===
Sporting JAX Aquatic Club is the competitive swimming arm of Sporting Club Jacksonville, operating under the Sporting JAX umbrella in Northeast Florida. The club serves swimmers and triathletes, offering training and competition opportunities at various levels and participating in regional and national events.

In October 2025, Olympic gold‑medalist swimmer Caeleb Dressel joined Sporting JAX Aquatic Club to prepare for the 2028 Olympic Games, reuniting with his longtime coach, Steve Jungbluth.

== Team records ==
As of May 25, 2026. Current players in bold. Statistics are updated once a year after the conclusion of the USL Super League season.

Most appearances
| Player | | | | | Appearances | | |
| # | Name | Nat. | Pos. | JAX career | USLS | Playoffs | Total |
|---|---|---|---|---|---|---|---|
| 1 | **Sophia Boman** | (United States) | MF | 2025– | 28 | 1 | 29 |
| 1 | **Meg Hughes** | (United States) | MF | 2025– | 28 | 1 | 29 |
| 1 | **Sophie Jones** | (United States) | MF | 2025– | 28 | 1 | 29 |
| 1 | **Paige Kenton** | (United States) | FW | 2025– | 28 | 1 | 29 |
| 5 | **Grace Phillpotts** | (United States) | DF | 2025– | 27 | 1 | 28 |
| 5 | **Ashlyn Puerta** | (United States) | MF | 2025– | 27 | 1 | 28 |
| 7 | **Georgia Brown** | (Scotland) | DF | 2025– | 26 | 1 | 27 |
| 8 | Jade Pennock | (England) | FW | 2025–26 | 25 | 1 | 26 |
| 9 | **Baylee DeSmit** | (United States) | FW | 2025– | 24 | 1 | 25 |
| 10 | **Kaitlyn Parks** | (United States) | GK | 2025– | 23 | 1 | 24 |

Top goalscorers
| Player | | | | | Goals scored | | |
| # | Name | Nat. | Pos. | JAX career | USLS | Playoffs | Total |
|---|---|---|---|---|---|---|---|
| 1 | **Ashlyn Puerta** | (United States) | MF | 2025– | 12 | 0 | 12 |
| 1 | **Baylee DeSmit** | (United States) | FW | 2025– | 12 | 0 | 12 |
| 2 | **Paige Kenton** | (United States) | FW | 2025– | 10 | 0 | 10 |
| 3 | **Sophia Boman** | (United States) | MF | 2025– | 6 | 0 | 6 |
| 4 | Jade Pennock | (England) | FW | 2025–26 | 3 | 0 | 3 |
| 5 | **Meg Hughes** | (United States) | MF | 2025– | 2 | 0 | 2 |
| 5 | **Georgia Brown** | (Scotland) | DF | 2025– | 2 | 0 | 2 |
| 5 | Katie Sullivan | (United States) | FW | 2025–26 | 2 | 0 | 2 |
