= Stacey Balaam =

English footballer and coach (born 1985)

Personal information
- Date of birth: 9 September 1985 (age 41)
- Place of birth: Suffolk, England
- Position: Midfielder

College career
Years	Team	Apps	(Gls)
2005–2008	Montevallo Falcons	71	(25)

Senior career*
Years	Team	Apps	(Gls)
2009–2010	ÍR Reykjavik	–	(1)
2011–2014	Atlanta Silverbacks	–	(1)

International career
2003–2004	England U19		

Managerial career
- 2007–2012: North Georgia (assistant)
- 2017–2022: West Georgia
- 2023–2025: Vanderbilt (assistant/associate)
- 2025–: Sporting JAX
- * Club domestic league appearances and goals

Stacey Balaam (/ˈbeɪləm/ BAY-ləm; born 9 September 1985) is an English-born former football player and current head coach of Sporting JAX in the USL Super League. As a player, she played as a midfielder and captained the Atlanta Silverbacks to the 2011 USL W-League championship and earned accolades playing in Iceland. She has held collegiate coaching positions at Vanderbilt University, the University of West Georgia, and the University of North Georgia, helping lead the Vanderbilt Commodores to the NCAA Division I Sweet 16 in 2023.

== Early life and playing career ==
Born in Suffolk, England, Balaam represented the England U‑19 national team before moving to the United States to play college soccer at the University of Montevallo, from 2005 to 2008. At Montevallo, she was a two-time NCAA Division II All-American, three-time All-Region, and four-time All-Gulf South Conference (GSC) selection. She finished as the school’s all-time leader with 100 points and 50 assists, and helped the Falcons win their first GSC tournament; she was later inducted into Montevallo’s Hall of Fame and the GSC's All-Decade team. She also scored 25 goals for the Falcons.

After college, Balaam played semi-professionally in Iceland—where she scored a game‑winner and earned a Team of the Week selection—before returning to the US to captain the Atlanta Silverbacks in the USL W‑League. She led the team to a league championship in 2011 and continued as captain through 2013.

== Coaching career ==
=== University of North Georgia ===
Balaam served six seasons as assistant coach for the North Georgia Nighthawks, from 2007 to 2012, contributing to a 91–24–10 record that included five NCAA Division II Tournament appearances and a program-best No. 2 NSCAA national ranking in 2015. She earned her USSF B‑licence and NSCAA coaching diplomas during this period.

=== University of West Georgia ===
In March 2017, she became head coach for the West Georgia Wolves. Over six seasons, she led the Wolves to 40 victories, including their first Gulf South Conference Tournament final appearance in 2021. The 2020 season was impacted by COVID-19, and Balaam departed in early 2023 to join a Division I program.

=== Vanderbilt University ===
In February 2023, Balaam joined the Vanderbilt Commodores as assistant coach under Darren Ambrose. She was promoted to associate head coach in February 2025. During her tenure, Vanderbilt scored 45 goals in a season—tied for 10th-most in program history—and reached the NCAA Sweet 16 in 2023.

=== Sporting JAX ===
==== 2025–26 ====
On 2 April 2025, Balaam was appointed the first head coach of Sporting JAX’s women’s USL Super League team.

Sporting JAX earned its first-ever competitive victory on 30 August 2025, when the team defeated the defending champion Tampa Bay Sun FC 3–2 in their second-ever match.

On 22 November, Sporting JAX earned its first-ever home win, a 2–0 victory over Fort Lauderdale United FC at Hodges Stadium on the campus of the University of North Florida (UNF). Prior to that match, the team had recorded one home friendly win and four away victories.

At the midway point of Sporting JAX’s inaugural season, the club occupied first place in the league standings, posting a record of seven wins, three losses, and four draws.

For her coaching efforts in December 2025, Balaam was named USL Super League Coach of the Month. The team went 2–0–1 and took the lead in the league standings over Lexington SC. She was subsequently named Coach of the Month for February 2026, following the midseason break.

In May 2026, she led the team to the USL Super League playoff semifinals, where they fell to Carolina Ascent FC 1–0. Following the conclusion of the USL Super League's regular season, Balaam was chosen as the league's Coach of the Year. She won 78% of the vote with the other four nominees tying for second with 6%, respectively.

=== 2026 ===
Balaam was named USL Super League Coach of the Month for August 2026 for leading Sporting JAX to a 3–0–0 start. She also led them to their first comeback victory in squad history when they beat Tampa Bay Sun FC 3–2 on 22 August 2026.

== Head coaching record ==
=== West Georgia ===
Record table
Season	Team	Overall	Conference	Standing	Postseason
West Georgia Wolves — Gulf South Conference (2017–2021)
2017	West Georgia	8–9–0	7–7–0	8th	GSC Tournament
2018	West Georgia	7–9–3	7–5–1	6th	GSC Tournament
2019	West Georgia	7–10–1	5–8–0	9th	Did not qualify
2020	West Georgia	3–4–0	2–3–0	8th	GSC Tournament
2021	West Georgia	9–8–2	7–6–0	6th	GSC Tournament Finalist
West Georgia:		34–40–6	28–29–1		
Total:		34–40–6 (.463)			
National champion Postseason invitational champion Conference regular season champion Conference regular season and conference tournament champion Division regular season champion Division regular season and conference tournament champion Conference tournament champion

=== Sporting JAX ===
Season	Team	Overall	Standing	Postseason
Sporting JAX — USL Super League (2025–)
2025–26	Sporting JAX	16–7–5	2nd	Semifinals
2026	Sporting JAX	5–2–6	–	
Sporting JAX:		21–9–11		
Total:		21–9–11 (.646)		

== Personal life ==
Balaam was raised in Suffolk, England, and supports West Ham United. She holds a USSF B coaching licence and NSCAA credentials as a goalkeeper coach and regional diploma recipient.

== Honors and recognition ==
As player:

- Two‑time NCAA Division II All-American
- Gulf South Tournament champion
- Montevallo Hall of Fame inductee
- USL W‑League Champion, 2011

As coach:

- First GSC Tournament Final appearance: 2021 with West Georgia
- NCAA Sweet 16 appearance: 2023 with Vanderbilt
- USL Super League Coach of the Month: December 2025; February 2026; August 2026
- USL Super League Coach of the Year: 2025–26
