= Becky Burleigh =

American soccer player and coach

Personal information
- Full name: Rebecca Lund Burleigh
- Date of birth: October 13, 1967 (age 59)
- Place of birth: Tarpon Springs, Florida, U.S.
- Positions: Defender; goalkeeper

Team information
- Current team: Sporting JAX

College career
Years	Team	Apps	(Gls)
1985–1988	Methodist College		

Managerial career
- 1989–1993: Berry College
- 1995–2021: Florida Gators
- 2021: Orlando Pride (interim)

Rebecca Lund 'Becky' Burleigh (born October 13, 1967) is an American soccer coach. She is currently a special advisor for Sporting Club Jacksonville, better known as Sporting JAX, of the United Soccer League.

Formerly also a college soccer player, she is best known for her 26-year tenure as the first head coach of the Florida Gators women's soccer team at the University of Florida, where she led the Gators soccer team to a National Collegiate Athletic Association (NCAA) Division I national championship in 1998. In 2021, Burleigh had a three-month spell as interim head coach of professional National Women's Soccer League team Orlando Pride.

== Playing career ==
During her collegiate playing career at Methodist College, Burleigh was a four-year varsity letterman in soccer for the Lady Monarchs, including Methodist's first four seasons as a varsity program. During her four seasons of play, she helped Methodist to a 55–19–4 (.731) record, four Dixie Intercollegiate Athletic Conference (DIAC) championships, three NCAA Division III Tournament appearances, and a trip to the 1988 Division III Final Four. Burleigh played defense for her first three seasons, and served as the team's goalie as a senior. She was a three-time First-Team All-DIAC selection and earned First-Team All-South honors in 1988. In 1999, she was inducted into the Methodist University Hall of Fame. She played under Head Coach Joe Pereira, who went on to a successful career at Old Dominion University following his departure from Methodist. She notes him as one of the people she admires.

== Coaching career ==
=== Berry College ===
In 1989, Burleigh was appointed head coach at Berry College, located in Mount Berry, Georgia. She was offered the Berry job within weeks of her own college graduation, at the age of 21. From 1989 to 1993, Burleigh compiled an 82–23–6 overall record during her five seasons at Berry, and her Lady Fury teams won two National Association of Intercollegiate Athletics (NAIA) national championships in 1990 and 1993.

=== Florida Gators ===
Burleigh was named the first head coach of the start-up Florida Gators soccer program on June 28, 1994.

In 1998, in the Gators soccer program's fourth year of existence, Burleigh coached the Gators to their first NCAA national title by defeating the defending national champion North Carolina Tar Heels 1–0 in the final. The 1998 Gators finished 26–1, their only regular season loss coming to the same North Carolina team that the Gators defeated in the NCAA championship final. Players from her 1998 national championship team included All-Americans Danielle Fotopoulos, Heather Mitts and Erin Baxter.

Burleigh's Gators played in the Eastern Division of the Southeastern Conference (SEC). In conference play, her Gators teams won thirteen SEC championships, and ten SEC tournament titles, leading all other SEC teams since the Florida soccer team began play in 1995.

Burleigh's later seasons were less successful, and she had losing records in two of her last three seasons as a head coach – the only losing seasons in her career. She announced she would retire at the end of the team's 2020–21 season, which concluded with a 2–0 win over the Miami Hurricanes on April 3, 2021.

As a head coach, Burleigh compiled an overall career record of 513–160–46, with a winning percentage of 0.745. She ranks second in total number of all-time wins among Division I coaches. During her tenure at Florida, Burleigh coached seventeen All-American players.

=== Orlando Pride ===
On July 25, 2021 Burleigh came out of retirement to become the interim head coach of professional NWSL team Orlando Pride for the remainder of the 2021 season following the midseason resignation of Marc Skinner. Her first game in charge was on July 31, a 1–1 tie with North Carolina Courage. She coached her first win the following week, a 2–0 victory on the road at Chicago Red Stars. Despite moving up to 4th place as Orlando picked up 12 points in Burleigh's first seven games, the team was mathematically eliminated from playoff contention with one game remaining following a 3–1 defeat to Racing Louisville FC on October 16, part of a four-game losing streak. On October 27, it was announced Burleigh had withdrawn herself from consideration for the permanent head coach job and would end her interim tenure following the final game of the season on October 29. The game extended Orlando's losing streak to five to finish the season as Chicago Red Stars won 1–0, leaving Burleigh with a 3–6–3 record during her interim tenure.

=== Sporting JAX ===
On June 23, 2023, it was announced that Burleigh had joined Sporting JAX, an expansion franchise of the United Soccer League, as women's team advisor.

== Personal ==
Burleigh grew up in Tarpon Springs, Florida, where she began to play youth soccer at the age of ten. She graduated magna cum laude with a bachelor's degree in biology from Methodist College (now known as "Methodist University") located in Fayetteville, North Carolina, in 1989. In 1993, Burleigh earned her master's degree in exercise science from Georgia State University located in Atlanta, Georgia.

In March 2018, Burleigh married Celia Slater.

== Coaching record ==
As of October 30, 2021

Head coaching record by team and tenure
Team	From	To	Record				
Team	From	To	P	W	L	T	Win %
Berry College	1989	1993	111	82	6	23	73.87
Florida Gators	June 28, 1994	April 3, 2021	608	431	154	23	70.89
Orlando Pride (interim)	July 25, 2021	October 30, 2021	12	3	6	3	25.00
Career totals			731	516	166	49	70.59

== Coaching honors ==
Berry College

- NAIA Women's Soccer Championship (2): 1990, 1993

Florida Gators

- NCAA Division I Women's Soccer Championship (1): 1998
- SEC regular season (14): 1996, 1997, 1998, 1999, 2000, 2001, 2004, 2007, 2008, 2009, 2010, 2012, 2013, 2015
- SEC Women's Soccer Tournament (12): 1996, 1997, 1998, 1999, 2000, 2001, 2004, 2007, 2010, 2012, 2015, 2016

Individual

- NSCAA National Coach of the Year (1): 1998
- SEC Coach of the Year (4): 1996, 2006, 2008, 2010

== See also ==
- Florida Gators
- List of college women's soccer coaches with 300 wins
- List of Florida Gators soccer players
- History of the University of Florida
- University Athletic Association
